= Battle of Bunker Hill (1861) =

Small skirmish near Bunker Hill, West Virginia, United States

- Part of the American Civil War
Date	July 15, 1861
Location	Bunker Hill, West Virginia
Result	Union Victory

Belligerents
USA (Union)	CSA (Confederacy)

Commanders and leaders
Gen. Robert Patterson	Col. J.E.B. Stuart

Strength
300+	600+

Casualties and losses
No claimed casualties	1 killed, 5 captured

The Battle of Bunker Hill was a small skirmish near Bunker Hill, West Virginia, on July 15, 1861, as part of the Manassas Campaign of 1861.

== Background ==
In early June and July 1861, Union forces under General Robert Patterson advanced through the Shenandoah Valley area of Virginia (modern West Virginia), capturing and occupying towns and villages and skirmishing with local Confederate Militia.

== Skirmish ==
On July 15 a Union force advanced on Bunker Hill and came into contact with a small force of Confederate cavalrymen. In the ensuing skirmish, the Union forces drove the Confederates from the town and occupied the area before proceeding to Charles Town.

== Order of battle ==
The following units were involved in the advance on and skirmish of Bunker Hill.

=== Union ===
- 10th Pennsylvania Infantry Regiment
- 17th Pennsylvania Infantry Regiment - Colonel Francis E. Patterson
- 21st Pennsylvania Infantry Regiment – Col. John F. Ballier
- 23rd Pennsylvania Infantry Regiment – Col. Charles P. Dare
- 11th Pennsylvania Infantry Regiment – Col. Phaon Jarrett
- McMullin's [McMullen's] Company, Pennsylvania Independent Rangers – Capt. William McMullen
- 1st Rhode Island Battery – Capt. Charles H. Tompkins
- 2nd U.S. Cavalry – detachment

=== Confederate ===
- Virginia Militia Cavalry
