= 103rd Field Artillery Regiment =

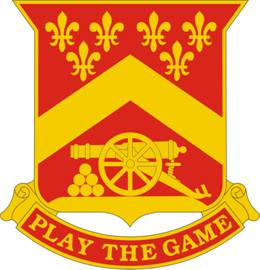
- 103rd FA Regiment insignia
- Active: 1801; 1917 to present
- Country: United States
- Branch: Field Artillery Branch
- Type: Field artillery
- Garrison/HQ: Armory of Mounted Commands
- Nickname: Providence Marine Corps of Artillery (Special Designation)
- Patron: Saint Barbara
- Equipment: M777A2 155mm Howitzers
- Engagements: World War I World War II; Iraq War

Commanders
- Current commander: LTC Brian Prochet
- Command Sergeant Major: CSM Roberto Matos

The 103rd Field Artillery Regiment (103rd FAR) is a regiment of the United States Army. The only currently existing component is the 1st Battalion, 103rd Field Artillery Regiment (1-103rd FAR), a unit of the Rhode Island National Guard. The regiment was originally constituted in 1917, but it descends from predecessor units dating back to 1801.

== Predecessor units (1801 to 1917) ==
=== Providence Marine Corps of Artillery ===
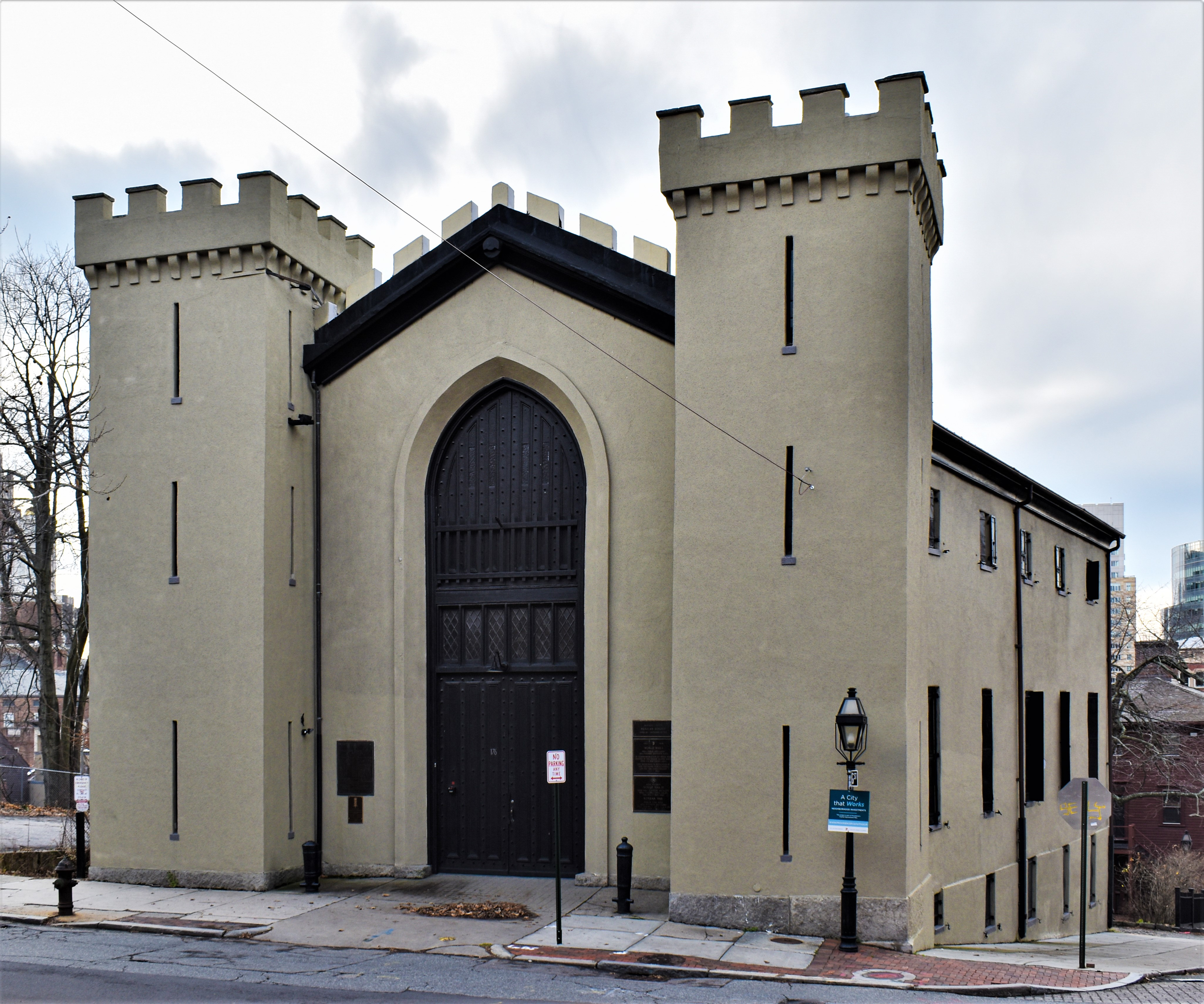
The Benefit Street Arsenal

The 103d Field Artillery Regiment traces its origins to the Providence Marine Corps of Artillery (PMCA). (Despite the similarity of their names, the PMCA has no connection with the United States Marine Corps.) The PMCA was originally organized in 1801 by the Providence Marine Society (founded in 1798). The PMCA's original purpose was to provide trained gun crews to merchant ships based in Providence, Rhode Island, which had been threatened by the French during the Quasi War (1798–1800) as well as the increasing menace of the Barbary pirates in the Mediterranean Sea. The PMCA's first commanding officer was Lieutenant Colonel Commandant Seth Wheaton (1759–1827), who had served as a lieutenant in the Rhode Island Militia during the American Revolution.

With the pacification of the Barbary states, the PMCA continued as a chartered command of the Rhode Island Militia. As a chartered command, it had the privilege of electing its own officers and was subject only to the authority of the Governor of Rhode Island – as it was not part of the "regular" militia structure of the state – rather than the senior officers of the state militia. Its membership consisted of leading citizens of Providence and was, thereby, considered an "elite" military unit.

In 1843 the PMCA completed the building known as the Benefit Street Arsenal. It still serves as the headquarters of the PMCA and holds a large collection of military artifacts ranging from the Civil War to the Second World War. The arsenal is listed on the National Register of Historic Places.

=== American Civil War ===
During the American Civil War, the PMCA was activated twice. The first time was at the outbreak of the war when it served from 18 April to 1 August 1861, as the 1st Rhode Island Battery under the command of Captain Charles Henry Tompkins. The unit was armed with 14-pounder James rifles at the First Battle of Bull Run near Manassas, Virginia, where weapons of this type are emplaced as of 2015 in the Manassas National Battlefield Park to commemorate the battery's service.

The second time was from May to August 1862, when it served as the 10th Rhode Island Battery under the command of Captain Edwin C. Gallup. The 10th Battery was deployed, along with the 9th and 10th Rhode Island Infantry regiments, to defend Washington, D.C. The battery moved to Washington, D.C., 27–29 May 1862, and was attached to Whipple's Command, Military District of Washington. Served duty at Camp Frieze, Tennallytown, until 23 June. At Cloud's Mills until 30 June, and then near Fort Pennsylvania until August when the battery returned to Rhode Island and was mustered out of service 30 August 1862.

The Benefit Street Arsenal not only served as the mobilization site for the PMCA but, also, for all eight batteries of the 1st Rhode Island Light Artillery Regiment, which was organized in 1861. As a result, the PMCA is considered the "Mother of the Rhode Island Batteries" – as is stated on a plaque affixed to the Benefit Street Arsenal.

As a result of desiring a veteran's organization under their own authority, veteran members of the PMCA formed the Veteran Association PMCA. This association, composed of past and honorary members of the Providence Marine Corps of Artillery, was organized on 21 January 1874. Its object was to "afford occasional opportunities to revive pleasant memories of the past, to unite in sympathy graduates separated by many years, and to secure for the active corps the benefit of their interest, influence, and strength". A large number of leading citizens of Rhode Island were members of the Veteran Association – including governors William Sprague, Henry Lippitt and Elisha Dyer Jr. The Veteran Association continues to exist as a private organization and is the de facto veterans association for the 103d Field Artillery Regiment.

=== Light Battery A ===
On 19 April 1875, the PMCA voted to make itself subject to the state militia laws and, on 1 May 1875, the PMCA was re-designated as Light Battery A of the 1st Artillery Battalion of the Rhode Island Militia. The other unit of the battalion was designated as Light Battery B. Battery B and the battalion were disbanded in 1879 when Light Battery A continued as a separate unit within the Rhode Island Militia.

Battery A was mobilized on 25 June 1898, for service in the Spanish–American War under the command of Captain Edgar R. Barker. The battery did not serve overseas but was stationed at the Quonset Point militia training camp in North Kingstown, Rhode Island. It was mustered out of service on 26 October 1898.

Battery A became part of the Rhode Island National Guard when the Guard was organized from units of the Rhode Island Militia in 1907. The National Guard was created by the Militia Act of 1903 which provided federal funding for state militia units in exchange for the units being trained and equipped to federal standards. While some militia units declined to be governed by federal regulations, Battery A, along with most of the other Rhode Island Militia units, chose to become part of the National Guard.

== First World War (1917 to 1919) ==
Light Battery A was expanded on 15 June 1917, to form the 1st Separate Battalion, Rhode Island Field Artillery. It was mustered into active service on 25 July 1917, at Quonset Point and drafted into federal service 5 August 1917. The unit was reorganized and redesignated on 20 August 1917, as the 1st Battalion of the newly formed 103d Field Artillery Regiment, an element of the 26th Division. The 26th Division, nicknamed the "Yankee Division", was formed from National Guard units of the six New England states of Connecticut, Maine, Massachusetts, New Hampshire, Rhode Island, and Vermont.

The 103rd Field Artillery Regiment consisted of two battalions of three batteries each. It served alongside the 101st and 102nd Field Artillery Regiments and the 101st Trench Mortar Battery in the 51st Field Artillery Brigade of the 26th Division. Along with the rest of the 26th Division, the 103rd was shipped to France in late 1917. Overseas, the regiment participated in six campaigns prior to the Armistice on 11 November 1918. The six campaigns were: Champagne-Marne, Aisne-Marne, St. Mihiel, Meuse–Argonne, Île-de-France and Lorraine.

== Interwar period (1919 to 1941) ==
The 103rd was demobilized along with the 26th Division, on 29 April 1919, at Camp Devens, Massachusetts. It was reorganized between April and November 1921 in the Rhode Island National Guard at Providence, Rhode Island, as the 1st Battalion, Field Artillery, with the headquarters being federally recognized on 17 November 1921 at Providence.

Per the National Defense Act of 1920, the 1st Battalion was redesignated on 25 November. 1921 as the 1st Battalion, 103rd Field Artillery, an element of the 43rd Infantry Division, a newly-formed National Guard division with units from Rhode Island, Connecticut, Maine, and Vermont. The regiment was consolidated on 2 January 1930, with the 2nd Squadron, 122nd Cavalry Regiment which became the 2nd Battalion, 103rd Field Artillery, and the consolidated unit was reorganized and redesignated as the 103d Field Artillery, with headquarters at Providence.

During the interwar period the 103rd was activated by order of the governor of Rhode Island for the following state emergencies:

- Strike duty, Pawtuxet, 20 February – 14 October 1922
- Strike duty, Manville, 31 August – 3 September 1926
- Textile workers strike, Saylesville and Bristol, 10–14 September 1934
- Flood relief, Pawtuxet River, 19–20 March 1936
- Flood relief, Norwood, 24–26 July 1938
- 1938 Hurricane, 21–25 September 1938

== World War II (1941–1945) ==
The 103rd was inducted into federal service on 24 February 1941 at home stations and was ordered to Camp Blanding, Florida. The 103rd Field Artillery Regiment was broken up on 19 February 1942 and its elements were reorganized and redesignated as follows: 1st and 2nd Battalions as the 103rd and 169th Field Artillery Battalions, respectively, elements of the 43rd Infantry Division; the regimental Headquarters was disbanded at this time.

During the Second World War, the 103rd and 169th Field Artillery Battalions served with the 43rd Infantry Division in the Pacific Theater. Both units earned campaign credit for service in the New Guinea, Northern Solomons, and Luzon campaigns. Additionally, the 169th Field Artillery Battalion earned credit for the Guadalcanal campaign.

Captain Elwood Joseph Euart of the regiment was the only member of the 103rd lost in the sinking of the U.S. Army transport ship USAT President Coolidge on 26 October 1942. Captain Euart had safely gotten off the President Coolidge when he heard that there were still men in the infirmary who could not get out. He returned through one of the sea doors and successfully rescued the men, but was then unable to escape himself and went down with the ship. He was posthumously awarded the Distinguished Service Cross for his heroic actions.

The 43rd Division was located in the Philippines at the time of the Japanese surrender on 2 September 1945.

== Post–World War II (1945 to 2001) ==
The 103d Field Artillery Battalion was inactivated on 22 October 1945, at Camp Stoneman, California. It was reorganized and federally recognized in the Rhode Island National Guard on 15 October 1946 with headquarters at Providence.

The 169th Field Artillery Battalion was inactivated on 22 October 1945 at Camp Stoneman, California. On 21 21 May 1946, it was relieved from assignment to the 43d Infantry Division. Reorganized and federally recognized 19 January 1948 with headquarters at Providence. Reorganized and redesignated 1 March 1949 as the 169th Antiaircraft Artillery Automatic Weapons Battalion and assigned to the 43d Infantry Division.

Shortly after the outbreak of the Korean War, in June 1950, the 103d and 169th Battalions, as units of the 43d Infantry Division, were ordered into active federal service 5 September 1950, and spent three years in Germany replacing Regular Army units which had been sent to fight in Korea. The 43d Infantry Division was demobilized shortly after the armistice was signed in July 1953.

The 103d Field Artillery Battalion and the 169th Antiaircraft Artillery Battalion were consolidated 1 April 1959, with Headquarters, 103d Field Artillery (concurrently reconstituted in the Rhode Island Army National Guard) to form the 103d Artillery, a parent regiment under the Combat Arms Regimental System, to consist of the 1st Rocket Howitzer Battalion and the 2d, 3d, and 4th Howitzer Battalions, elements of the 43d Infantry Division. The 103d FA Battalion was re-designated as 1st Battalion, 103d Artillery Regiment (1st/103d) on 19 June 1961.

The 103d Artillery Regiment was reorganized 18 March 1963 to consist of the 1st, 2d, and 3d Howitzer Battalions. Reorganized on 1 January 1965, to consist of the 1st, 2d, and 3d Howitzer Battalions and Battery F. Reorganized 1 March 1966, to consist of the 1st, 2d, and 3d Howitzer Battalions.

The 43d Infantry Division was disbanded on 16 December 1967, and its units were assigned to other organizations. Among other changes, Headquarters and Headquarters Battery, 43rd Infantry Division Artillery, was reorganized and redesignated 18 March 1963 as Headquarters and Headquarters Battery, XLIII Corps Artillery, and relieved from assignment to the 43d Infantry Division. The 103d Artillery was reorganized on 1 February 1968, to consist of the 1st and 2d Battalions.

The 103d Artillery Regiment was redesignated on 1 March 1972 as the 103d Field Artillery Regiment.

In February 1978 the 103d Field Artillery was mobilized, along with the entire Rhode Island National Guard, to provide emergency service in response to the Great Blizzard of 1978, which paralyzed the state with over 3 feet of snow.

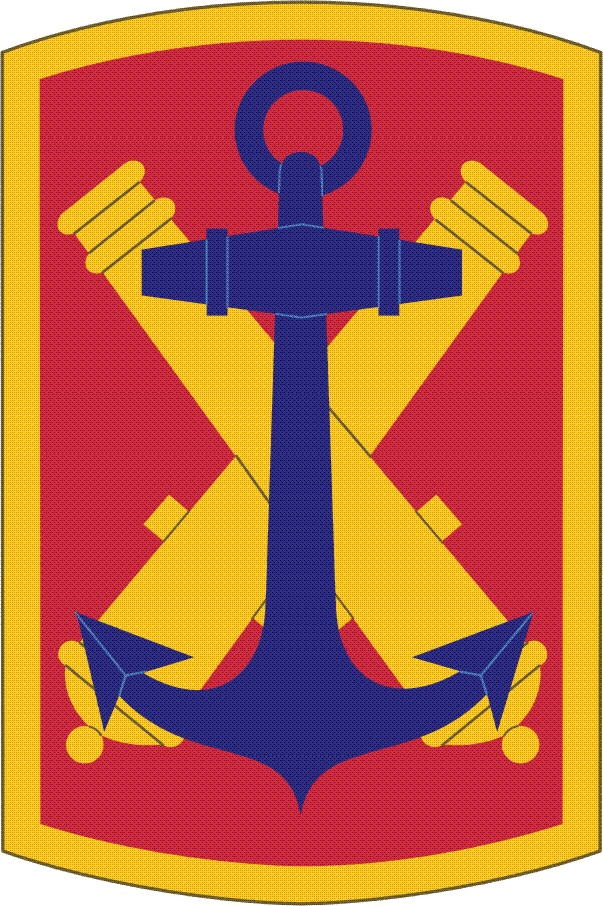
103rd Field Artillery Brigade

On 1 May 1968 the Headquarters and Headquarters Battery of the XLIII Corps Artillery was redesignated as the Headquarters and Headquarters Battery of the 103d Artillery Group to provide commanded and control of the 1st/103d and the 2nd/103d. Soon afterwards, it became the 103rd Field Artillery Group on 1 March 1972. In October 1979 the 103d Field Artillery Group was redesignated as the 103d Field Artillery Brigade. The 103d FA Brigade also had operational control of three other field artillery battalions under the CAPSTONE program which integrated Regular Army, Army Reserve, and National Guard units. While the 103d FA Brigade shared the same numerical designation as the 103d FA Regiment, it did not share the same lineage and honors as it traced its history to Headquarters, 68th Field Artillery Brigade, constituted 13 February 1929 in the Rhode Island National Guard, which in 1942 had become 43rd Infantry Division Artillery.

As of 1984 the 1st and 2nd Battalions were part of the 103rd Field Artillery Brigade, headquartered at Providence, both equipped with 155-mm towed artillery pieces.

The 2d Battalion, 103d Field Artillery Regiment was inactivated in September 1991. The 1-103d remained under the 103d Field Artillery Brigade. In the late 1990s the Cranston Street Armory in Providence was closed and the headquarters of the 103d Field Artillery Brigade, as well as the Headquarters Battery, Battery A, and Service Battery of the 1st-103d, were relocated to the Armory of Mounted Commands on North Main Street in Providence. Battery B of the 1-103d was located at a former Nike missile site in North Smithfield and Battery C was located in Bristol adjacent to the Rhode Island Veterans Home.

== Recent conflicts (2001 to present) ==
Elements of the 1st Battalion, 103d Field Artillery Regiment were mobilized for service in Iraq and Kuwait during the Iraq War (U.S. phase, 2003-2010). From January 2004 to April 2005 batteries A and B of the 1-103d served on active duty and supported combat operation in Iraq for nearly 13 of the 15-month mobilization. On 3 December 2014, Battery A (Forward) was awarded the Meritorious Unit Commendation along with the 1st Battalion, 206th Field Artillery Regiment for meritorious service during the deployment.

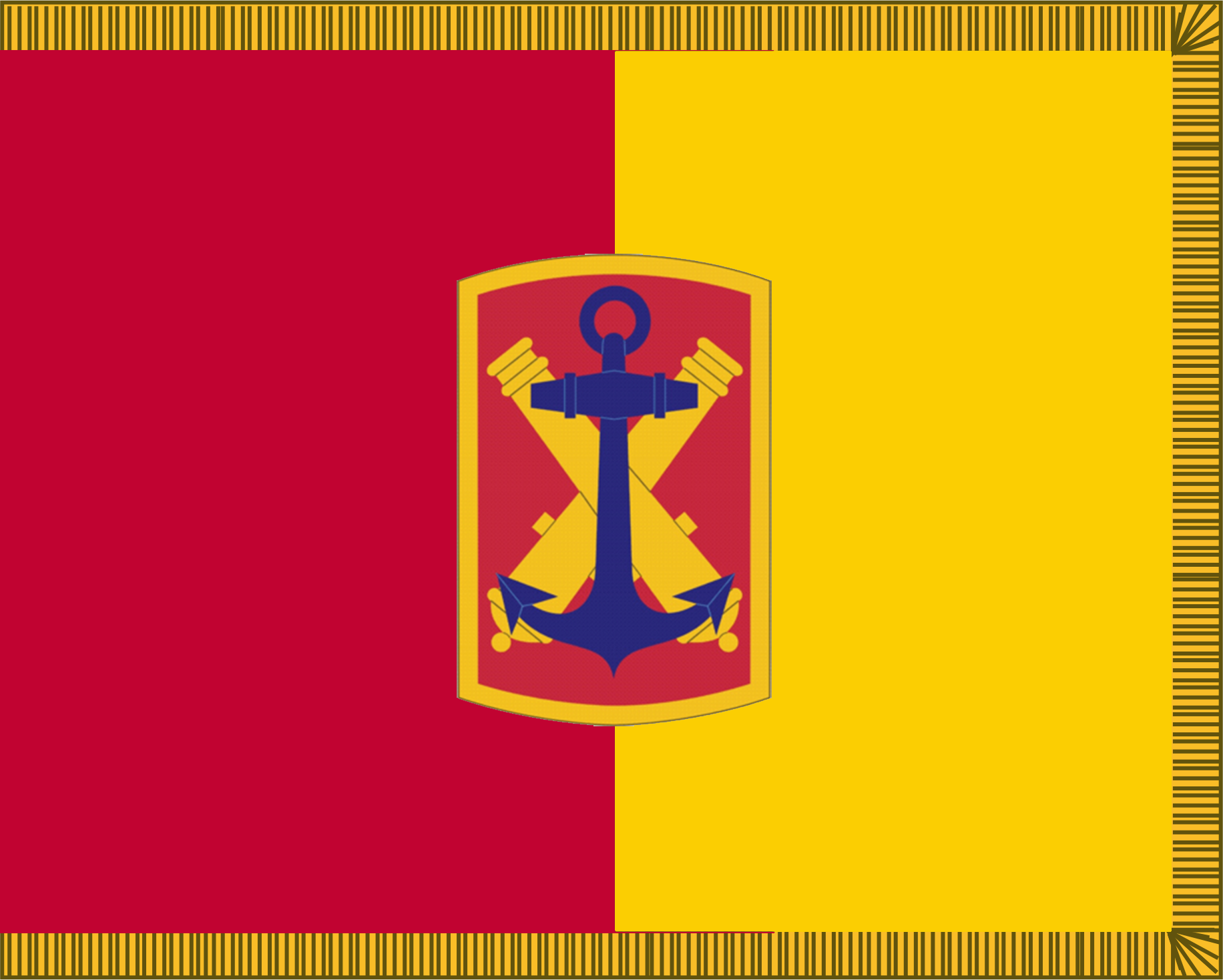
103rd Field Artillery Brigade Flag

Headquarters and Headquarters Battery of the 103d Field Artillery Brigade was mobilized in August 2004, was sent to Iraq, and served until August 2005. C Battery, 1-103d deployed to Iraq from September 2007 to September 2008.

The Headquarters of the 103d Field Artillery Brigade was inactivated on 6 September 2008. As a result, the 1st Battalion, 103d Field Artillery was reassigned to the 197th Field Artillery Brigade, New Hampshire Army National Guard in its operational chain of command and to the 43rd Military Police Brigade (Rhode Island Army National Guard) in its administrative chain of command. At the same time as the inactivation of the 103d Field Artillery Brigade, the 1207th Transportation Company and the 1043d Maintenance Company were consolidated to form the 1207th Forward Support Company (FSC) to provide logistical and maintenance support to 1st Battalion, 103d Field Artillery.

As of 2020, 1st Battalion, 103d Field Artillery continues to serve in the Rhode Island National Guard. The 1st BN 103d FA consists of five units: Headquarters and Headquarters Battery, Batteries A, B and C (C Btry re-stationed to NH Army National Guard in 2019), and the 1207th Forward Support Company (FSC).

== Current Units ==
- Headquarters & Headquarters Battery - Providence, RI
- Battery A (M777A2) - Providence, RI
- Battery B (M777A2) - North Smithfield, RI
- Battery C (M777A2) - Lebanon, NH
- 1207th Forward Support Company - Camp Fogarty

== Veterans association ==
In the post World War II era, the name "Providence Marine Corps of Artillery" has been used by a private non-profit entity that functions as the de facto veterans association of the 103d Field Artillery. (Its membership is primarily current and former members of the 103d Field Artillery with a select group of other individuals.) It holds a long term lease on the historic Benefit Street Arsenal which houses numerous artifacts that commemorate the history of the 103d Field Artillery. The arsenal is also used for meetings of Elisha Dyer Camp 7 of the Sons of Union Veterans of the Civil War (SUVCW) and the annual encampment of the Rhode Island Department of the SUVCW.

== Notable members ==
- Brigadier General Harold R. Barker - artillery commander of the 43rd Infantry Division.
- Colonel Howard F. Brown
- Major General William C. Chase - Commander of the 1st Cavalry Division.
- Brigadier General Elisha Dyer Jr. – Adjutant General and Governor of Rhode Island.
- Brigadier General Pelham D. Glassford - Commander during World War I.
- Lieutenant Colonel Frederick Lippitt – Commander of 103d Field Artillery Battalion from 1953–1963, public servant and philanthropist.
- Colonel Henry Lippitt – Governor of Rhode Island.
- Major General James W. Nuttall
- Colonel John A. Twachtman – Commanded regiment during World War I.
- Brigadier General Richard Valente

== Heraldry ==
Coat of arms

Distinctive unit insignia
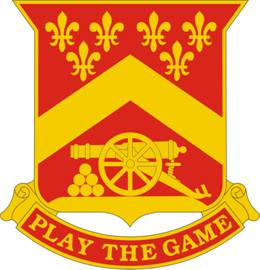

== See also ==
- State Arsenal (Providence, Rhode Island)
