= John Tompkins =

John Tompkins may refer to:

- John Almy Tompkins (1837-1916), Union Army Major and Brevet Lieutenant Colonel during U.S. Civil War
- John Almy Tompkins II (1871-1941), American architect

== See also ==
- John Tomkins (disambiguation)
