= Thomas H. Neill =

Thomas Hewson Neill
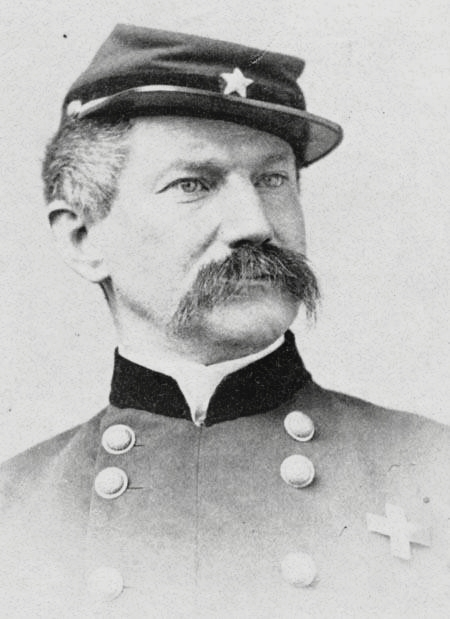
- Born: April 9, 1826; Philadelphia, Pennsylvania
- Died: March 12, 1885 (aged 58); Philadelphia, Pennsylvania
- Burial place: West Point Cemetery
- Military career
- Allegiance: United States of America; Union
- Branch: United States Army; Union Army
- Service years: 1847-1883
- Rank: Brigadier General; Brevet Major General
- Commands: 23rd Pennsylvania Infantry; 6th US Cavalry Regiment; Commandant of Cadets
- Conflicts: American Civil War

Thomas Hewson Neill (1826–1885) was a native of Pennsylvania, became a general in the American Civil War, serving in the Army of the Potomac in some of its most important campaigns.

== Birth and early years ==
Neill was born in Philadelphia, Pennsylvania on April 9, 1826. Educated in local schools, he attended the University of Pennsylvania before transferring to the United States Military Academy at West Point, New York. He graduated 27th of a class numbering 38 members in 1847. Neill served on the frontier, usually with the 5th U.S. Infantry, before the outbreak of the Civil War. He also taught briefly at West Point. At the outbreak of the war Neill was a captain, having reached that rank on April 1, 1857.

== Civil War ==
When the war began, Neill served on the staff of the Department of Annapolis and then on the staff of Gen George Cadwalader in the Department of Pennsylvania. Then he was made colonel of the 23rd Pennsylvania Infantry, which he led in Darius Couch’s division of IV Corps Army of the Potomac in the Peninsula Campaign and the Seven Days Battles. Neill was injured in the ankle at the Battle of Malvern Hill. Neill next served under Couch in the Maryland Campaign. He became a brigade commander in the second division of BG Albion Howe in VI Corps at the Battle of Fredericksburg. Neill was promoted to the rank of brigadier general on April 15, 1863, his rank postdated to November 29, 1862. During the Chancellorsville Campaign, Neill brigade led the advance of Howe’s division at the Second Battle of Fredericksburg, also known as the Second Battle of Marye's Heights, when VI Corps, under Maj. Gen. John Sedgwick drove Jubal Early’s division away from the Heights. His brigade also fought in the Battle of Salem Church. Neill had his horse shot from under him in the fight for Scott's Ford, Sedgwick's means of escaping across the Rappahannock River from converging Confederate attacks.

VI Corps served as the army’s reserve in the Battle of Gettysburg. By the end of the battle, Neill’s brigade was on the far right flank of the army’s infantry line, positioned on Wolf Hill. It engaged in skirmishing with the Confederates of Edward Johnson's division, which was engaged on Culp's Hill. Neill Avenue, on Wolf Hill, in the Gettysburg National Military Park is named for him. Neill led John Baillie McIntosh's cavalry brigade, his own brigade and some artillery in the pursuit of the Confederate army toward Fairfield Gap beginning on July 5, 1863. His report for Gettysburg emphasizes that part of the campaign.

When VI Corps was reorganized in the winter of 1863-1864, Neill retained his brigade; but Howe was replaced by Brig. Gen. George W. Getty. Getty was wounded in the Battle of the Wilderness, and Neill commanded his division for most of the Overland Campaign of Ulysses S. Grant. Getty returned early in the Siege of Petersburg, and Neill became a staff officer in XVIII Corps of the Army of the James. Then he served as inspector general on the staff of Maj. Gen. Philip Sheridan in the Valley Campaigns of 1864. There is no record of his service in the Civil War after December 1864. He received brevet promotion as a major general of volunteers and brigadier of regulars for his war service on March 13, 1865.

After the war, Neill reverted to regular service as a major in the infantry. (He had been promoted to that rank on August 26, 1863.) He became lieutenant colonel of the 1st U.S. Infantry on February 22, 1869. Neill became a cavalry commander, leading the 6th U.S. Cavalry beginning in 1879, when he became a colonel. He also was commandant of cadets at West Point for four years. Neill served in Texas before retiring on disability in 1883. Neill died in Philadelphia on March 12, 1885. He is buried at West Point.

== See also ==
- List of American Civil War generals (Union)
