= Benjamin H. Child =

American Civil War veteran

- Born: May 8, 1843; Providence, Rhode Island
- Died: May 16, 1902 (aged 59)
- Burial place: Swan Point Cemetery
- Military career
- Allegiance: United States of America
- Branch: United States Army
- Service years: 1861 - 1865
- Rank: Second Lieutenant
- Unit: Battery A, 1st Regiment Rhode Island Volunteer Light Artillery
- Conflicts: Battle of Antietam
- Awards: Medal of Honor

Benjamin Ham Child (May 8, 1843 – May 16, 1902) was an American soldier who fought in the American Civil War. Child received the United States' highest award for bravery during combat, the Medal of Honor, for his action during the Battle of Antietam in Maryland on 17 September 1862. He was honored with the award on July 20, 1897.

== Biography ==
Child was born in Providence, Rhode Island, on May 8, 1843. He joined the 1st Rhode Island Light Artillery in June 1861. After his Medal of Honor action, he was promoted to Sergeant, and wounded in the Battle of Gettysburg. He was commissioned as a Second Lieutenant in August 1863, and was discharged by special order from General George Meade after serving a total of 43 months.

In 1868, Child joined the Providence Police Department, and he was appointed as Chief of Police in 1881. He died on May 16, 1902, and his remains are interred at Swan Point Cemetery in Providence, Rhode Island.

== Medal of Honor citation ==
Rank and organization: Corporal, Battery A, 1st Rhode Island Light Artillery. Place and date: At Antietam, Maryland, September 17, 1862. Date of issue: July 20, 1897.

Citation:

Was wounded and taken to the rear insensible, but when partially recovered insisted on returning to the battery and resumed command of his piece, so remaining until the close of the battle.

== See also ==
- List of American Civil War Medal of Honor recipients: A–F
