= 23rd Pennsylvania Infantry Regiment =

Union Army infantry regiment

23rd Pennsylvania Volunteer Infantry
- Pennsylvania flag
- Active: April 18, 1861, to September 8, 1864
- Country: United States
- Allegiance: Union
- Branch: United States Army; Union Army
- Type: Infantry
- Engagements: Battle of Bunker Hill (1861); Battle of Seven Pines; Battle of Chantilly; Second Battle of Fredericksburg; Battle of Salem Church; Battle of Gettysburg; Battle of Cold Harbor; Siege of Petersburg; Battle of Fort Stevens

The 23rd Pennsylvania Volunteer Infantry was an infantry regiment that fought in the Union Army during the American Civil War. Known for its colorful uniforms based upon the popular French Zouave style, the regiment served in the Eastern Theater.

== History ==
Recruiting for the regiment commenced on April 18, 1861, at the Arsenal, at the corner of Sixteenth and Filbert streets in Philadelphia. Many members and the organization of the unit was drawn from the 1st Pennsylvania militia regiment. Both Charles P. Dare and David B. Birney retained their positions as colonel and lieutenant colonel, respectively. Capt. George C. Spear of Company A was elected major. Three days after recruitment started, the newly formed regiment left for active duty.

After some garrison duty in their native Pennsylvania, the 23rd was assigned to the 1st Brigade, 1st Division of General Robert Patterson's Army of the Shenandoah. The unit's first fight was at the Battle of Hoke's Run in the Shenandoah Valley on July 21, 1861, although it suffered no casualties. One week later, it was ordered back to Philadelphia, where it was mustered out on July 31. Two days later, three companies were mustered in again for three years service. Dare was forced to resign his position due to disease (from which he would soon die). Birney was promoted to colonel, with Charles Wilhelm taking his place as lieutenant colonel. Spear remained as major.

By August, fifteen new companies had been raised, twelve from Philadelphia and one each from Pittsburgh, Pennsylvania, Wilkes-Barre, and Columbia. It was ordered to Washington, D.C., where it was assigned to the IV Corps of the Army of the Potomac. On February 17, 1862, Birney was promoted to brigadier general and Thomas H. Neill replaced him as colonel. Soon afterwards, four companies were detached and became part of the 61st Pennsylvania Infantry. Spear, promoted to lieutenant colonel, was also assigned to the 61st. Another company was disbanded and its men distributed to the other companies.

The 23rd fought in the Peninsula Campaign, not seeing much action until the Battle of Seven Pines, where it lost 143 men in severe fighting. It faced only minor skirmishing during the Seven Days Battles, losing only a few men. In July, it was transferred back to Washington too late to fight in the nearby Second Battle of Bull Run. However, the unit did see action at the subsequent Battle of Chantilly, losing five men.

During the Maryland Campaign, the 23rd Pennsylvania guarded the Potomac River from White's Ferry to Nolen's Ferry, along with the 36th New York Infantry. During this time, it lost one officer and twenty-four men captured. In late September, it was transferred to the VI Corps. The 23rd did not fight in the first Battle of Fredericksburg, but did in the Second Battle of Fredericksburg. The unit had not been assigned an active role in the fighting, but when it saw another regiment rout, it charged in without orders, helping carry Marye's Heights. It saw more action at the subsequent Battle of Salem Church.

At the Battle of Gettysburg, the regiment supported Maj. Gen. John Geary's division on Culp's Hill on July 3. In this battle, it suffered only minor losses, and primarily remained in reserve.

In the 1864 spring reorganization of the Army of the Potomac, the 23rd Pennsylvania was reassigned to the 4th Brigade, 1st Division, VI Corps. At the beginning of the Overland Campaign, it guarded prisoners, rejoining the Army near the end of the Battle of North Anna. At the Battle of Cold Harbor, the 23rd lost 4 officers and 71 enlisted men killed, 5 officers and 111 enlisted men wounded, and 3 men captured in the ill-fated June 3 attack on the Confederate lines. After several days of additional skirmishing, the regiment was transferred with the rest of the corps to Bermuda Hundred and from there crossed the Appomattox River. Over the next few weeks, the unit fought in various actions during the Siege of Petersburg.

On July 9, the 23rd was transferred with the rest of the VI Corps to Washington, D.C., in response to Jubal Early's attack on the city. After Early's retreat into the Shenandoah Valley, the regiment, along with the VI and XIX Corps followed the Confederates. On September 8, the 23rd was mustered out of service, with those men who enlistments had not expired yet being transferred to the 82nd Pennsylvania Infantry.

== Reenactors ==
Currently, a group based in Gettysburg, portrays Company F. It was founded in March 2001 and has about 60 members. It is part of the 2nd Regiment of Vincent's Brigade.

== Casualties ==
- Killed and mortally wounded: 5 officers, 110 enlisted men
- Wounded: ? officers, 1 enlisted man
- Died of disease: 3 officers, 70 enlisted men
- Captured or missing: ? officers, ? enlisted men
- Total casualties: ? officers, ? enlisted men

== See also ==
- List of Pennsylvania Civil War Units
