= 1st Rhode Island Battery =

Union artillery unit during the American Civil War

- Active: April 1861 to August 2, 1861
- Country: United States
- Allegiance: Union
- Branch: Artillery
- Engagements: American Civil War: Battle of Bunker Hill (1861)

Commanders
- Colonel (United States): Samuel G. Arnold

The First Rhode Island Battery (also known as "Tompkins' Marine Artillery") was an artillery unit which served in the Union Army during the American Civil War.

== Service record ==
The 1st Rhode Island Battery was organized by Colonel Samuel G. Arnold at the Benefit Street Arsenal in Providence for three months' service in April 1861. It was organized from the Providence Marine Corps of Artillery, a unit of the Rhode Island Militia. It was commanded by Captain Charles Henry Tompkins (and later Colonel and Brevet General).

The Battery left Rhode Island for Jersey City, New Jersey on April 18, 1861, then moved to Easton, Pennsylvania on April 19, and to Washington, D.C., on April 27. It performed duty in the defense of that city until June 9. It was mustered into Federal service May 2, and attached to Hunter's Division, McDowell's Army of Northeast Virginia. It moved to Williamsport, Maryland, June 9–15, and returned to Washington June 17–20, and then marched to Williamsport July 9–13, and to Martinsburg, WV. It was then attached to Thomes' Brigade, Patterson's Army and marched to Bunker Hill, VA, and saw action there on July 15.

The Battery moved to Charlestown July 17, and to Harper's Ferry July 22 and then moved to Sandy Hook, New Jersey and then to Providence, RI, July 29–31. It was mustered out of service on August 2, 1861.

== See also ==
- List of Rhode Island Civil War units

== Bibliography ==
- Dyer's Compendium of the War of Rebellion.
