= The Church-in-the-Gardens =

- U.S. National Register of Historic Places
- New York State Register of Historic Places
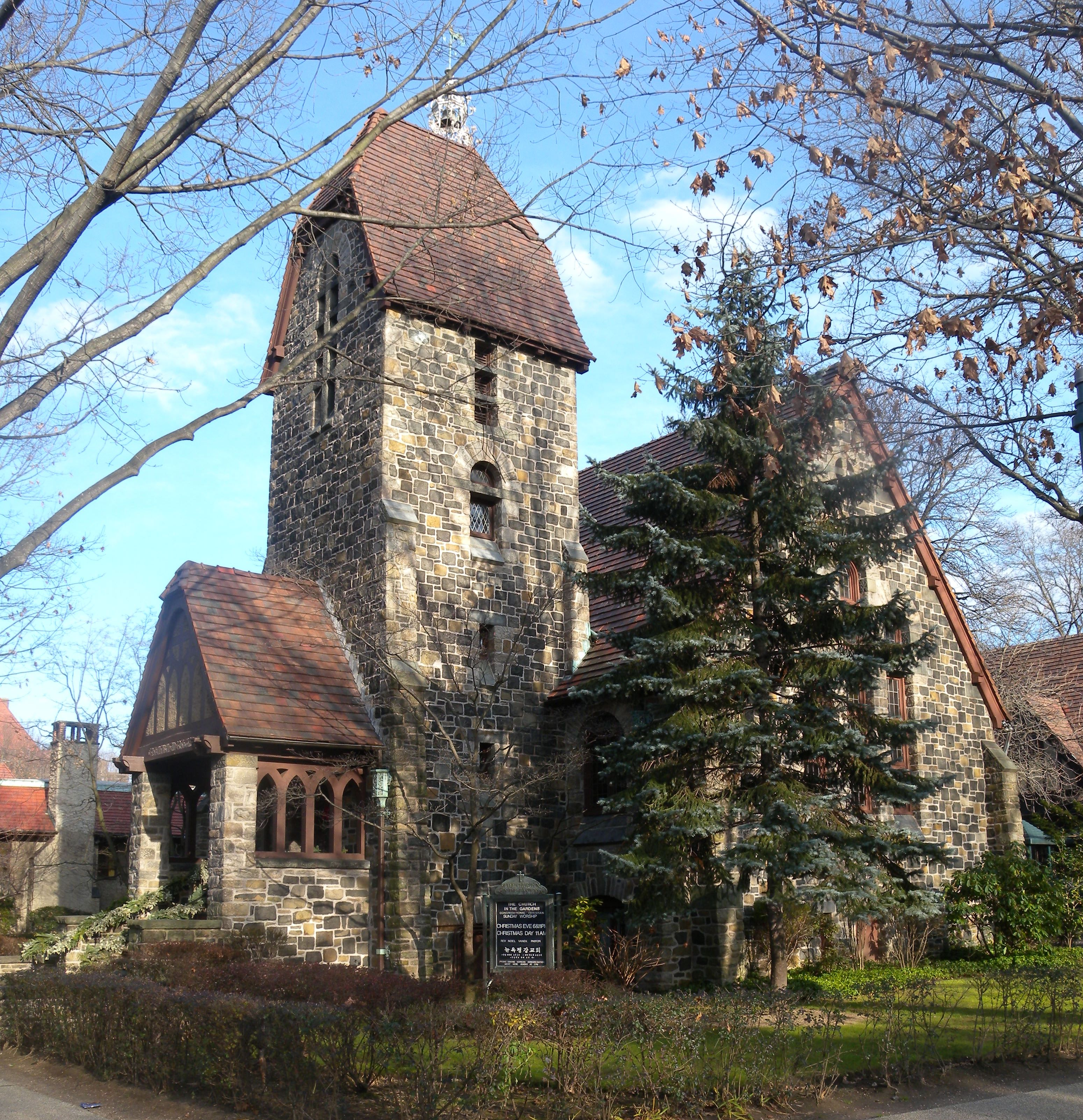
- Church in the Gardens, December 2011

- Location within New York Location within the United States
- Location: 50 Ascan Ave., Forest Hills, New York
- Coordinates: 40°42′59″N 73°50′29″W
- Area: 1 acre (0.40 ha)
- Built: 1915, 1926, 1929, 1953
- Architect: Grosvenor Atterbury; John Almy Tompkins II; Phelps, Stowe; Wagner, Steward
- Architectural style: Tudor Revival
- NRHP reference No.: 09001086
- NYSRHP No.: 08101.011378, 08101.011424

Significant dates
- Added to NRHP: December 11, 2009
- Designated NYSRHP: September 20, 2009

The Church-in-the-Gardens, also known as Community Congregational Christian Church, is a historic Congregational church complex located in Forest Hills, Queens, New York. The complex includes the church (1915), Community House (1926), and Parish Hall (1953) connected by breezeways and a separate parsonage (1929). The buildings are all in an eclectic Tudor Revival style. The church was designed by architects Grosvenor Atterbury and John Almy Tompkins II and is a rectangular building with a prominent tower and attached bell tower. The congregation joined the United Church of Christ in May 2012.

It was listed on the National Register of Historic Places in 2009.
