= Charles Henry Tompkins Sr. =

Union Army Brevet Brigadier General

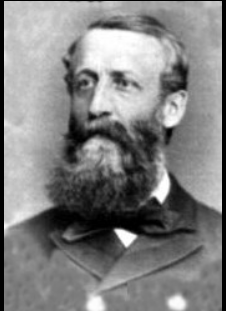
- Born: May 15, 1834; New Windsor, New York, U.S.
- Died: April 9, 1895 (aged 60); Somerville, New Jersey, U.S.
- Burial place: New Somerville Cemetery; Somerville, New Jersey
- Military career
- Allegiance: United States of America; Union
- Branch: United States Army; Union Army
- Service years: 1861-1865
- Rank: Colonel; Brevet Brigadier General
- Commands: Rhode Island 1st Marine Light Volunteer Artillery; Artillery Division of the Sixth Army Corps
- Conflicts: American Civil War; Battle of Gettysburg; Battle of Shenandoah Valley; Battle of Second Bull Run; Battle of Cedar Creek

Charles Henry Tompkins Sr. (May 15, 1834 – Aug 9, 1895) was an American officer who served as a Union Army Colonel, who received an appointment to the brevet grade of Brigadier General of volunteers during the American Civil War.

He is not to be confused with another Union officer, Brevet Brigadier General Charles H. Tompkins (1830-1915) from Virginia who was a Medal of Honor recipient during the Civil War.

== Early life ==
Charles Tompkins was born on May 15, 1834 in New Windsor, New York.

Prior to the outbreak of the U.S. Civil War, Tompkins was a merchant in Providence, Rhode Island.

== Military career ==
Prior to the war he was in the Providence Marine Corps of Artillery and had been serving as its Colonel since 1858.

Tompkins enlisted in the Union Army as a Captain in Providence, Rhode Island, on April 17, 1861. On May 2, 1861, he was mustered into and organized the Rhode Island 1st Marine Light Volunteer Artillery for three months, which unit was nicknamed "Tompkins' Marine Artillery." He was commander of the Battery unit, which was part of the Providence Marine Corps of Artillery, a detached unit of the Rhode Island militia. He mustered out of service from the First Rhode Island Light Volunteer Artillery on August 6, 1861. The unit was jokingly referred to as the "Geography Class" as it served in a lot of places.

On August 1, 1861, Governor William Sprague IV was authorized by the Secretary of War to establish a new artillery battalion and Tompkins was promoted to Major to head the new battalion, the First Rhode Island Light Volunteer Artillery Regiment. The Regiment oversaw Batteries A, B, C, D, E, F, G, and H. Under his command, the Regiment became known as one of the finest regiments in the Union Army. Nine soldiers from his Regiment were awarded the Medal of Honor and served in every battle of the Army of the Potomac.

He was put in command of the Artillery Division of the Sixth army Corps on May 12, 1863.

On September 13, 1861, was promoted to Colonel of the First Rhode Island Light Volunteer Artillery Regiment and became Chief of Artillery in a brigade of the 6th Corps in the Army of the Potomac, which role he held for the remainder of his time in the war. As Chief of Artillery in the Sixth Army Corps, he had at least eight units under him. The Second Division was commanded by his brother, John A. Tompkins.

As part of the First Rhode Island Light Artillery Regiment, he was actively involved in the Battle of Shenandoah Valley; the Battle of Second Bull Run; and the Battle of Cedar Creek. He served in more of a leadership role for many other battles, including the Battle of Gettysburg.

He was wounded in the Battle of Cedar Creek attempting to help withdraw Battery G. In praising Battery G, he wrote, “The conduct of officers and men was gallant in the extreme and it merits the hearty commendation of all who witnessed it. Rhode Island has just cause to be proud of such soldiers.

On December 12, 1865 he was nominated by President Abraham Lincoln and on August 1, 1864, he was brevetted brigadier general of U.S. volunteers for "For Gallant Service at Richmond and Shenandoah." He was mustered out of service from the army on April 21, 1865.

He was a member of the Military Order of the Loyal Legion of the United States (MOLLUS), a United States military order organized on April 15, 1865, in the wake of the assassination of President Abraham Lincoln amidst rumors that there was a plot to overthrow the U.S. government.

== Personal life ==
Tompkins was married to Jane Eliza Carr. They had five children: Hannah; Charles Henry Tompkins Jr.; Vincent; Eliza Rodman Tompkins; and John Almy Tompkins II, an architect in New York. His brother was Union army Lieutenant Colonel John Almy Tompkins.

He moved to Baltimore in 1870 and then Staten Island n 1880.

He died on August 9, 1895, in Somerville, New Jersey.

== See also ==
- Battle of Bunker Hill (1861)
- Battle of Seven Pines order of battle: Union
- Seven Days Battles order of battle: Union
- Battle of Chancellorsville order of battle: Union
- Battle of Gettysburg order of battle: Union
- Bristoe campaign order of battle: Union
- Battle of Mine Run order of battle: Union
- Battle of the Wilderness order of battle: Union
- Battle of Spotsylvania Court House order of battle: Union
- Battle of Cold Harbor order of battle: Union
- Second Battle of Petersburg order of battle: Union
- Battle of Fort Stevens order of battle: Union
- Third Battle of Winchester
- Battle of Cedar Creek order of battle: Union
- 1st Rhode Island Battery
- List of American Civil War brevet generals
