= 17th Pennsylvania Infantry Regiment =

- Active: April 25, 1861 - August 2, 1861
- Country: United States
- Allegiance: Union
- Branch: Union Army
- Type: Infantry
- Size: 863
- Part of: Army of the Shenandoah
- Nickname: "Quaker Regiment"
- Engagements: Rockville Expedition (June 10-July 1, 1861); Skirmish at Edward's Ferry (June 18, 1861); Skirmish at Bunker Hill, Virginia (July 15, 1861)

Commanders
- Notable commanders: Colonel Francis E. Patterson; Lieutenant Colonel Robert O. Tyler; Major William A. Leech

The 17th Pennsylvania Infantry Regiment, originally known as the 1st Pennsylvania Artillery Regiment in the Pennsylvania State Militia, was an Infantry regiment that served in the Union army during the early stages of the American Civil War. The regiment was nicknamed as the "Quaker Regiment" due to the drab felt hats supplied by civilians to the men of the regiment.

== Formation ==
The regiment's lineage can trace back to September 16, 1814, when it was initially organized as a militia battalion at Camp Dupont, under the command of Andrew M. Prevost, it was later expanded into a regiment on November, 1814. Prior to the Civil War, the regiment frequently relied on civil authorities to maintain civil order, notably playing a role in suppressing the Philadelphia nativist riots in 1844.

With the outbreak of the Civil War, recruitment began in Philadelphia on April 15, 1861. Drawing from the pre-existing militia structure, the regiment quickly reached its required strength in three days, with the regiment numbering 863 in total. On April 25, 1861, the regiment was mustered into service for Three months' service.

The companies of this regiment were led by:

- Company A -- Captain ?
- Company B -- Captain David P. Foley
- Company C – Captain John H. Gardiner
- Company D – Captain Joseph H. Sinex
- Company E – Captain Robert Thompson
- Company F – Captain Alexander Murphy
- Company G – Captain William Pritner
- Company H – Captain Isaac C. Bassett
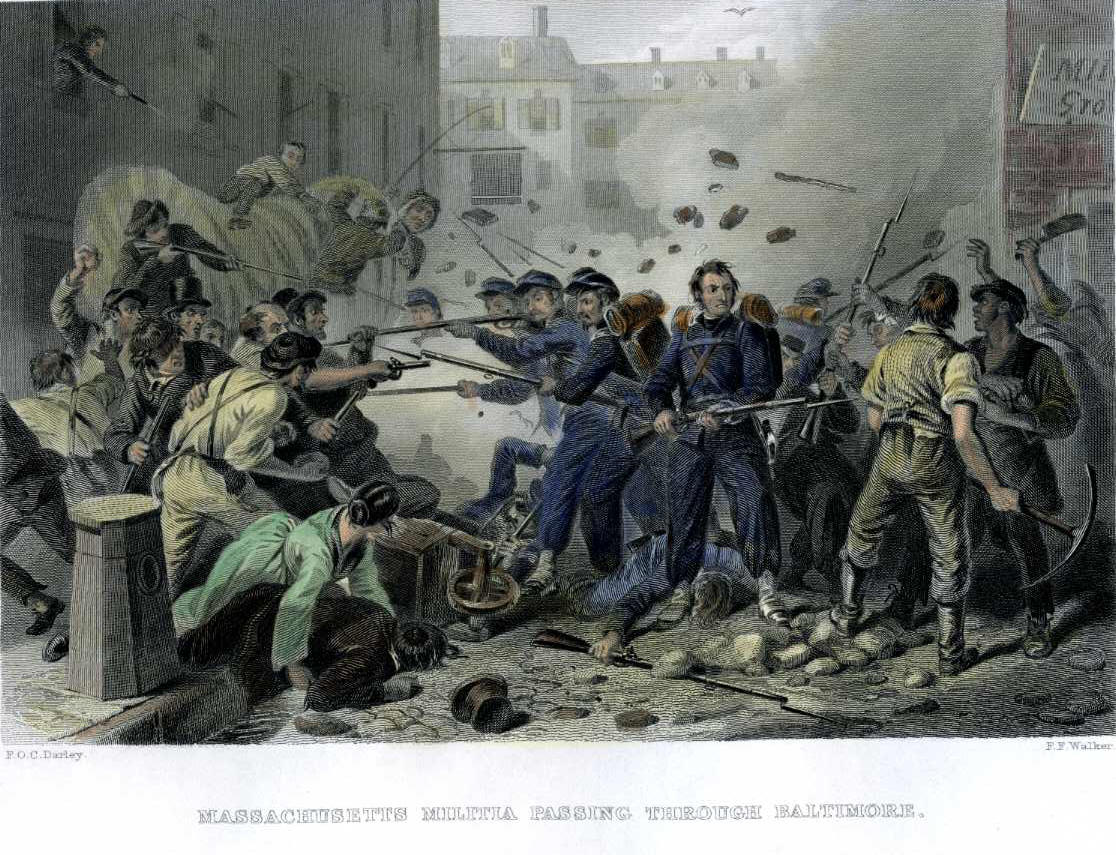
- During the Baltimore Riot, the 6th Massachusetts became the first Union unit to take casualties in action on April 19, 1861.
  Company I – Captain William J. J. Braceland
- Company K – Captain Charles M. Tapper

Initially designated as the 1st Pennsylvania Artillery, Pennsylvania Governor Andrew G. Curtin officially re-designated the regiment as the 17th Pennsylvania Infantry Regiment on May 15, 1861. Citizens of Philadelphia and Merchants actively supported the regiment, by supplying subsistence, stockings and underclothing before they were mustered into service. On June 6, 1861, a few patriotic citizens presented the regiment with drab felt hats, in which, earned them the nickname the "Quaker Regiment"

== Service ==
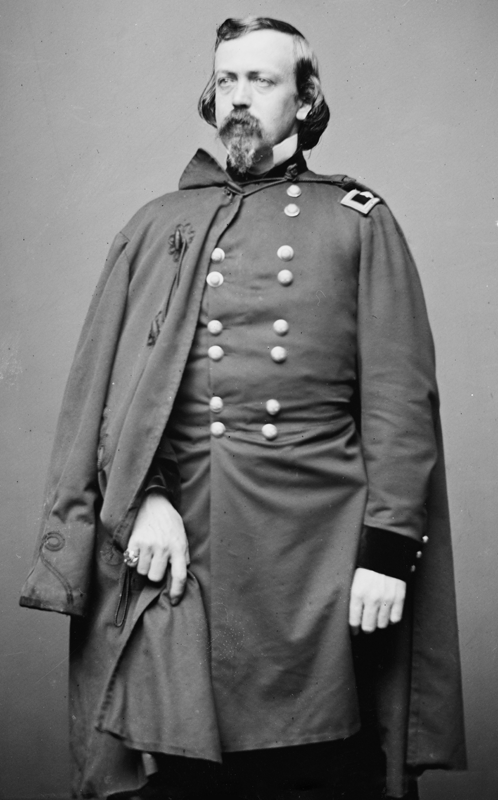
Col. Charles Pomeroy Stone

Following the Baltimore riot of April 19, 1861, where the 6th Massachusetts was attacked by a mob, no Union troops were able to successfully pass through the city. To deal with this problem, Robert Patterson ordered the regiment to Perryville, Maryland on May 8, alongside an artillery battery and detachments of the 3rd US Infantry, they traveled via transport ships to Locus Point. The regiment marched through to Camden Station without facing any resistance, effectively breaking Confederate hold on the city, just before General Benjamin Butler began to establish permanent military possession there five days later.

Following their success in Baltimore, it moved to Washington D.C., arriving on May 10, becoming the first regiment to enter Washington D.C, it was initially quartered in the Senate Chamber of the U.S. Capitol, before they were subsequently quartered at Camp Cadwalader on Kalorama Heights, while they were stationed there, they had transitioned their training from using Winfield Scott's tactics to using newly mandated light infantry tactics, in which the regiment was drilled in.

On June 10, the 17th Pennsylvania was assigned to take part in the Rockville Expedition under the command of Colonel Charles P. Stone, this force would move to Poolesville, Maryland, by June 14. Detachments of the regiment were stationed along the Potomac River to monitor and prevent Confederate river crossings.

On June 18, Companies B and C, alongside a platoon of cavalry and a battery of twelve-pounders, encountered Confederate forces on the opposite side of the river at Conrad's Ferry, but repulsed them by directed shelling and the fire of rifled muskets, they were later reinforced by Company I and D. on the same day, twenty sharpshooters from Company E, under the command of Captain Gardner, were ordered to Edward's Ferry, to silence a Confederate battery that was shelling the 1st New Hampshire stationed there.

On July 1, the regiment left Poolesville, fording the Monocacy River and marched through the Catoctin Mountains to Points of Rocks and to Knoxville, Maryland. Although regimental commanders initially planned an attack crossing into Leesburg, Virginia, to destroy a portion of the Manassas Gap Railroad, their orders were overridden once General Robert Patterson redirected them to join his Army of the Shenandoah. Fording the Potomac River at Williamsport on July 7, the 17th Pennsylvania joined the main Union forces at Martinsburg, Virginia, the following day. They were attached to the 7th Brigade, 3rd Division, serving frequently as skirmishers, taking part in a skirmish at Bunker Hill, driving Confederate forces there (July 15), and moving through Charlestown (July 17)

As the regiment's three month enlistment period was coming to its expiration, Patterson requested that the regiment should remain in the field incase their services were required, in which the regiment overwhelmingly accepted. While the regiment were stationed at Bolivar Heights near Harper's Ferry, the regiment was presented with new suites of regimental and national colors donated by the women of Philadelphia.

Following the Union defeat at the First Battle of Bull Run on July 21, the regiment offered to extend its service for an additional month and march directly to the defense of Washington, but the War Department rejected it, and the regiment marched to Sandy Hook, Maryland, subsequently being ordered back to Pennsylvania, and was mustered out of service on August 2, 1861.

== Organizational affiliations, battles and detailed service ==
During its formation, the regiment was attached to larger formations during its service: such as:

- Attached to Stone's Command, Rockville Expedition, June 10-July 1.
- Attached to 7th Brigade, 3rd Division, Patterson's Army

=== Battles ===
A list of battles in which the regiment took part in:

- Rockville Expedition (June 10, 1861)
- Skirmishes at Edward's Ferry (June 18, 1861)
- Skirmish at Bunker Hill, West Virginia (July 15, 1861)

=== Detailed Service ===
==== 1861 ====
- Organized at Philadelphia and mustered in April 25, 1861.
- Designated 17 May 15, 1861.Service & Battles - 1861
- Moved to Perryville, thence to Baltimore, Md., May 8, and to Washington, D.C., May 10.
- Camp on Kalorama Heights till June 10.
- Attached to Stone's Command, Rockville Expedition, June 10-July 1.
- Edward's Ferry June 18.
- Join Patterson at Martinsburg, Va., July 7.
- Attached to 7th Brigade, 3rd Division, Patterson's Army.
- Advance on Bunker Hill July 15.
- March to Charleston July 17, thence to Harper's Ferry July 21.
- Moved to Philadelphia and mustered out August 2, 1861.

== Commanders ==
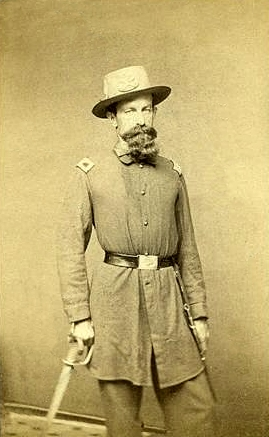
Col. Francis E. Patterson

- Colonel Francis E. Patterson
- Lieutenant Colonel Robert O. Tyler
- Major William A. Leech

== See also ==
- List of Pennsylvania Civil War regiments
- Pennsylvania in the Civil War
