= Peter McAdams =

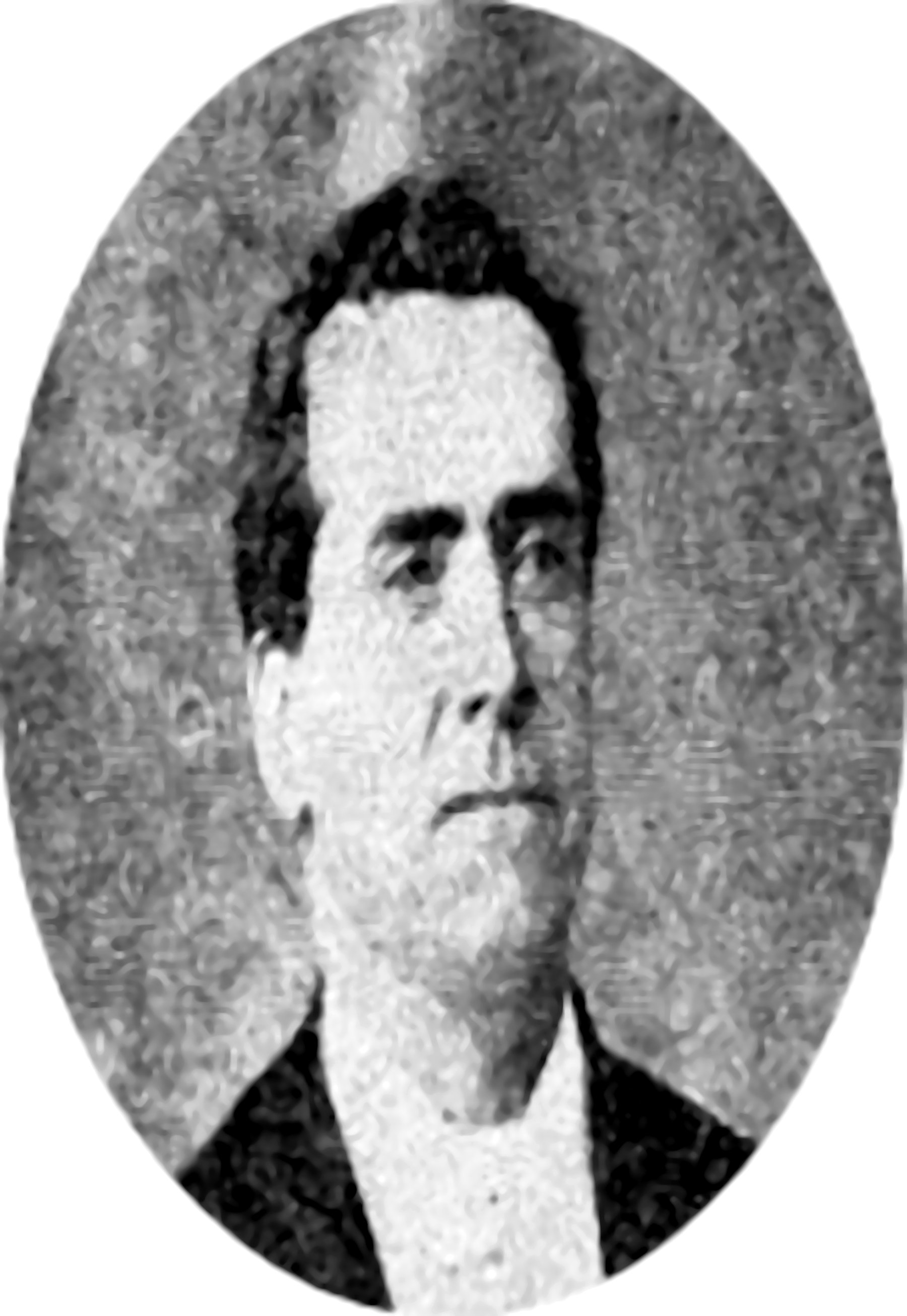
- Born: April 21, 1834; Armagh, Ireland
- Died: September 29, 1926 (aged 92); Roxborough, Pennsylvania, US
- Burial place: Manayunk, Pennsylvania, US
- Military career
- Allegiance: United States of America
- Branch: United States Army
- Service years: 1861–1865
- Rank: Second lieutenant
- Units: Company A, 98th Pennsylvania Infantry
- Conflicts: American Civil War
- Awards: Medal of Honor

Peter McAdams (April 21, 1834 – September 29, 1926) was an Irish American soldier who fought in the American Civil War. He emigrated to America at the age of 14 and worked initially as a shoemaker. Upon the outbreak of the Civil War, he enlisted in the Union Army. McAdams fought with the 98th Pennsylvania Infantry at the Battles of Williamsburg and Fredericksburg. He received a promotion to sergeant for his action in rescuing a wounded comrade at the Battle of Salem Church on May 3, 1863. McAdams was later commissioned as an officer and fought in this role at the Battle of Cold Harbor. He was seriously injured and left the army after the war. McAdams was awarded the Medal of Honor on April 1, 1898.

== Biography ==
McAdams was born in Armagh, Ireland on April 21, 1834. He and his sister emigrated to the United States in 1848 when he was fourteen; they settled in Manayunk, Pennsylvania. McAdams first found work as a shoemaker, but after the Battle of Fort Sumter, he enlisted into the 21st Pennsylvania Infantry. However, the regiment was disbanded before McAdams could participate in any fighting.

He later enlisted into the 98th Pennsylvania Infantry with many of his former comrades from the 21st Pennsylvania Infantry. He participated in several battles, including the Battle of Williamsburg and the Battle of Fredericksburg. During the Battle of Salem Church, his regiment was forced back to a defensive position in a field, leaving many wounded soldiers behind. Among the injured, McAdams spotted one of his comrades and closest friends, Private Charles Smith. After receiving permission from his commanding officer, McAdams rushed over to Smith's position, placed him on his back, and ran 250 yards (230 m) back to his company while under fire. Smith later died from his wounds, which included a gun shot wound to the head. McAdams received a promotion to sergeant for his heroic rescue.

Sometime later, McAdams was promoted to second lieutenant and participated in the Battle of Cold Harbor. He was seriously injured and mustered out of the army on June 29, 1865. After the war, McAdams married Catherine Gill. The couple did not have any children. He was awarded the Medal of Honor on April 1, 1898. McAdams died on September 29, 1926, after suffering from pleurisy. He was buried at St. John the Baptist Cemetery in his hometown of Manayunk, Pennsylvania.

== Medal of Honor citation ==
Citation: Went 250 yards in front of his regiment toward the position of the enemy and under fire brought within the lines a wounded and unconscious comrade.

== See also ==
- List of Medal of Honor recipients
- List of American Civil War Medal of Honor recipients: M–P
