= 122nd Cavalry Regiment =

- Active: 1929-1937
- Country: United States
- Branch: Army
- Type: Cavalry
- Size: Regiment
- Motto: Forward Without Fear
- Colors: Yellow

The 122nd Cavalry Regiment was a separate cavalry regiment of the United States Army, part of the National Guard. Organized in 1929 from separate squadrons of cavalry in Connecticut and Rhode Island, the regiment was disbanded in 1937, with some elements converted to other units.

== History ==
=== 1st Separate Squadron, Connecticut Cavalry ===
During World War I, the 1st Squadron, Connecticut Cavalry, was converted and redesignated as part of the 101st Machine Gun Battalion, an element of the 26th Division. The unit arrived at the port of Boston on 6 April 1919 on the USS Agamemnon, and was demobilized on 29 April 1919 at Camp Devens, Massachusetts. It was reconstituted in the National Guard in 1922 as the 1st Separate Squadron, Cavalry, and allotted to Connecticut. It was organized on 9 March 1923 and federally recognized with headquarters at New Haven, Connecticut. The squadron conducted summer training at the state military reservation at Niantic, Connecticut, from 1923–28. Redesignated on 3 May 1929 as the 1st Squadron, 122nd Cavalry.

==== Commander ====
- Major William H. Welch (CT) (9 March 1923–3 May 1929)

=== 1st Separate Squadron, Rhode Island Cavalry ===
During World War I, the 1st Squadron, Rhode Island Cavalry, was converted and redesignated as part of the 103rd Machine Gun Battalion, an element of the 26th Division. The unit arrived at the port of Boston on 16 April 1919 on the USS Patricia and was demobilized on 30 April 1919 at Camp Devens. It was reconstituted in the National Guard on 22 August 1921 and allotted to Rhode Island. It was organized on 29 May 1922 and federally recognized with headquarters at Providence, Rhode Island. The squadron, or elements thereof, was called up to perform the following state duties: strike duty at Pawtuxet, Rhode Island, 20 February–14 October 1922; strike duty at Manville, Rhode Island, 31 August–3 September 1926. The squadron conducted annual summer training at Charlestown, Rhode Island, from 1921–26. It was redesignated on 24 February 1927 as the 2nd Squadron, 110th Cavalry Regiment.

==== Commander ====
- Major Samuel A. Hall (RI) (29 May 1922–24 February 1927)

=== 122nd Cavalry Regiment ===
The 122nd Cavalry Regiment was constituted in the National Guard on 15 March 1929 and allotted to Connecticut and Rhode Island. The entire regiment, less the 2nd Squadron and Machine Gun Troop, were allotted to Connecticut, while the 2nd Squadron and Machine Gun Troop were allotted to Rhode Island. The subordinate squadron headquarters were organized and federally recognized as follows: 1st Squadron organized on 3 May 1929 at New Haven, by redesignation of the 1st Separate Squadron, Connecticut Cavalry; 2nd Squadron organized 1 April 1929 at Providence, by redesignation of the 1st Separate Squadron, Rhode Island Cavalry. The regimental headquarters was organized on 6 July 1929 and federally recognized at New Haven. On 8 January 1930, the 2nd Squadron was converted and redesignated as the 2nd Battalion, 103rd Field Artillery Regiment, and concurrently a new 2nd Squadron was constituted and allotted to Connecticut. The regimental headquarters was relocated on 22 July 1935 to West Hartford, Connecticut. The entire regiment was called up to perform flood relief duty in March 1936. The regiment conducted summer training at the state military reservation at Niantic from 1930–36. The 122nd Cavalry Regiment was disbanded on 10 June 1937. Concurrently, the headquarters, Machine Gun Troop, and 1st Squadron were redesignated as the new 1st Squadron, 110th Cavalry Regiment.

==== Commanders ====
- Lieutenant Colonel William H. Welch (CT) (6 July 1929–16 December 1934)
- Lieutenant Colonel Philip S. Wainwright (CT) (17 December 1934–18 May 1936)
- Lieutenant Colonel Louis S. Tracy (CT) (18 May 1936–9 June 1937)
