= 98th Pennsylvania Infantry Regiment =

Union Army volunteer infantry regiment

98th Pennsylvania Volunteer Infantry
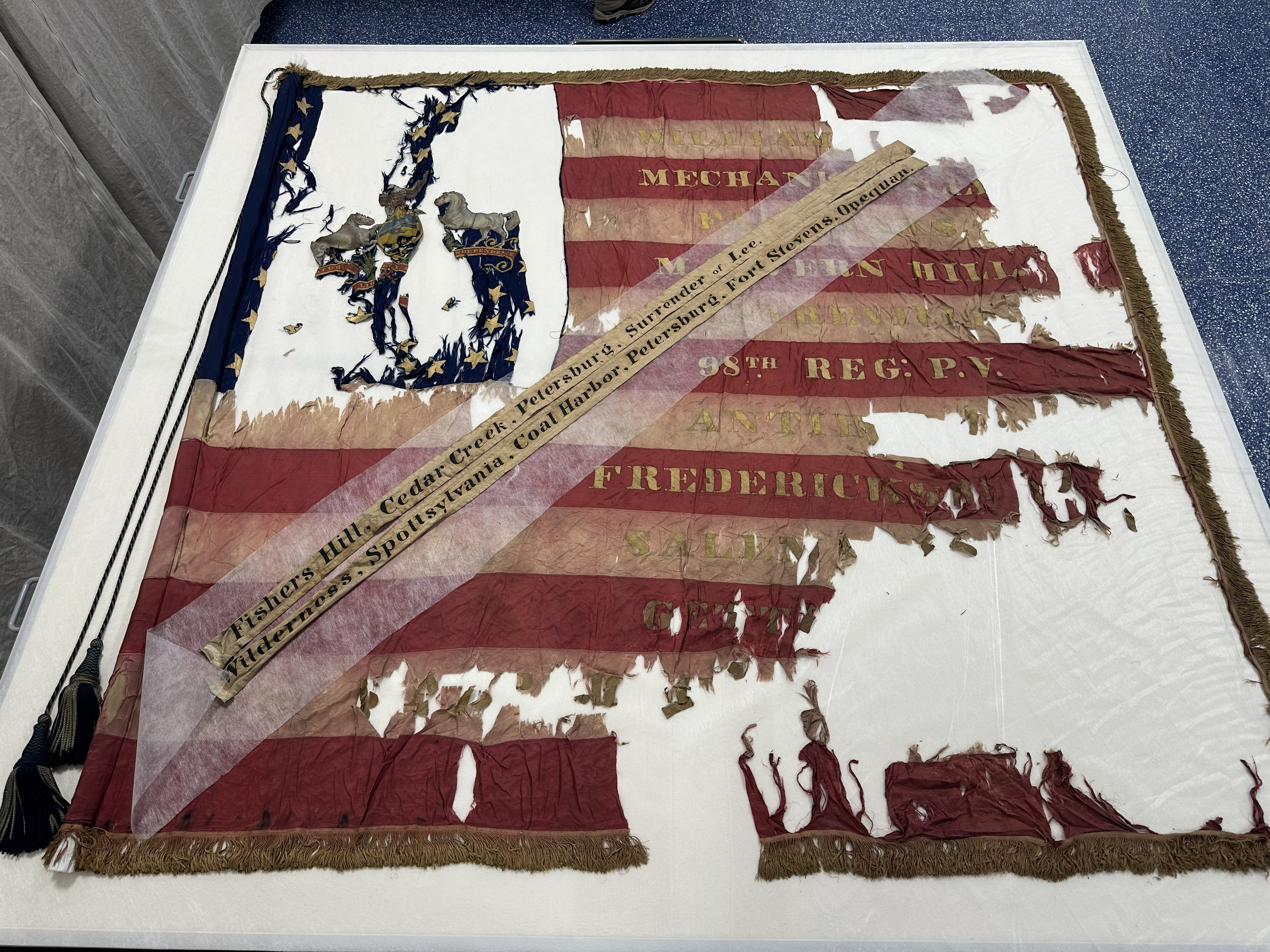
- Regimental colors of the 98th Pennsylvania Volunteer Infantry Regiment
- Active: 17 August 1861–29 June 1865
- Country: United States of America
- Allegiance: Union
- Branch: Union Army
- Role: Infantry
- Size: 4,020
- Part of: Army of the Potomac; VI Corps
- Engagements: American Civil War

Commanders
- Colonel: John F. Ballier
- Colonel: Adolph Mehler

The 98th Pennsylvania Infantry was a volunteer infantry regiment which served during the American Civil War. Colonel John Ballier, who founded the unit to replace his 21st Regiment, served as commanding officer.

The majority of the men who fought with the regiment were of German heritage; many came from the Philadelphia area. One, August Frank of Company E, was reportedly descended from the family of George Washington (through his brother Augustine). A member of Company A, Peter McAdams, was awarded the Medal of Honor for his rescue of an unconscious comrade during the Battle of Salem Church.

== Service history ==
Perhaps most famous for its service at Salem Church, Virginia, the 98th Pennsylvania had its initial combat experience in the Battle of Williamsburg. In addition, the regiment fought at Fredericksburg, Gettysburg, and Appomattox, among other engagements. The Regiment was part of 2nd Division, VI Corps, under George W. Getty which was dispatched to hold an important intersection during the Battle of the Wilderness. The 98th was also present at the surrender of General Robert E. Lee.

== Casualties ==
The regiment sustained a significant number of casualties during its service tenure, including 9 Officers and 112 Enlisted men killed and mortally wounded, and 1 Officer and 72 Enlisted men by disease. During the Battle of Fort Stevens on July 12, 1864. Colonel Ballier was one of those wounded during the engagement, a military encounter in which President Abraham Lincoln was also nearly injured by Confederate fire while standing on a parapet surveying the action. After having sustained a gunshot wound to his right ankle on May 3, he then also sustained a gunshot wound to his right thigh at Fort Stevens.

== Commanders ==
- Colonel John F. Ballier (September 30, 1861 – June 29, 1865) originally the commander of the 21st Pennsylvania Infantry Regiment, Ballier was the nominal commander throughout the life of the regiment, he was wounded twice, once at the Battle of Salem Church in 1863, and again at the Battle of Fort Stevens in 1864. Ballier was brevetted with the rank of Brevet Brigadier General.
- Colonel Adolph Mehler (November 26, 1862 – March 12, 1863) promoted from Lieutenant Colonel on November 26, 1862, temporarily led the regiment until being discharged on March 12, 1863.

== Monuments and Memorials ==
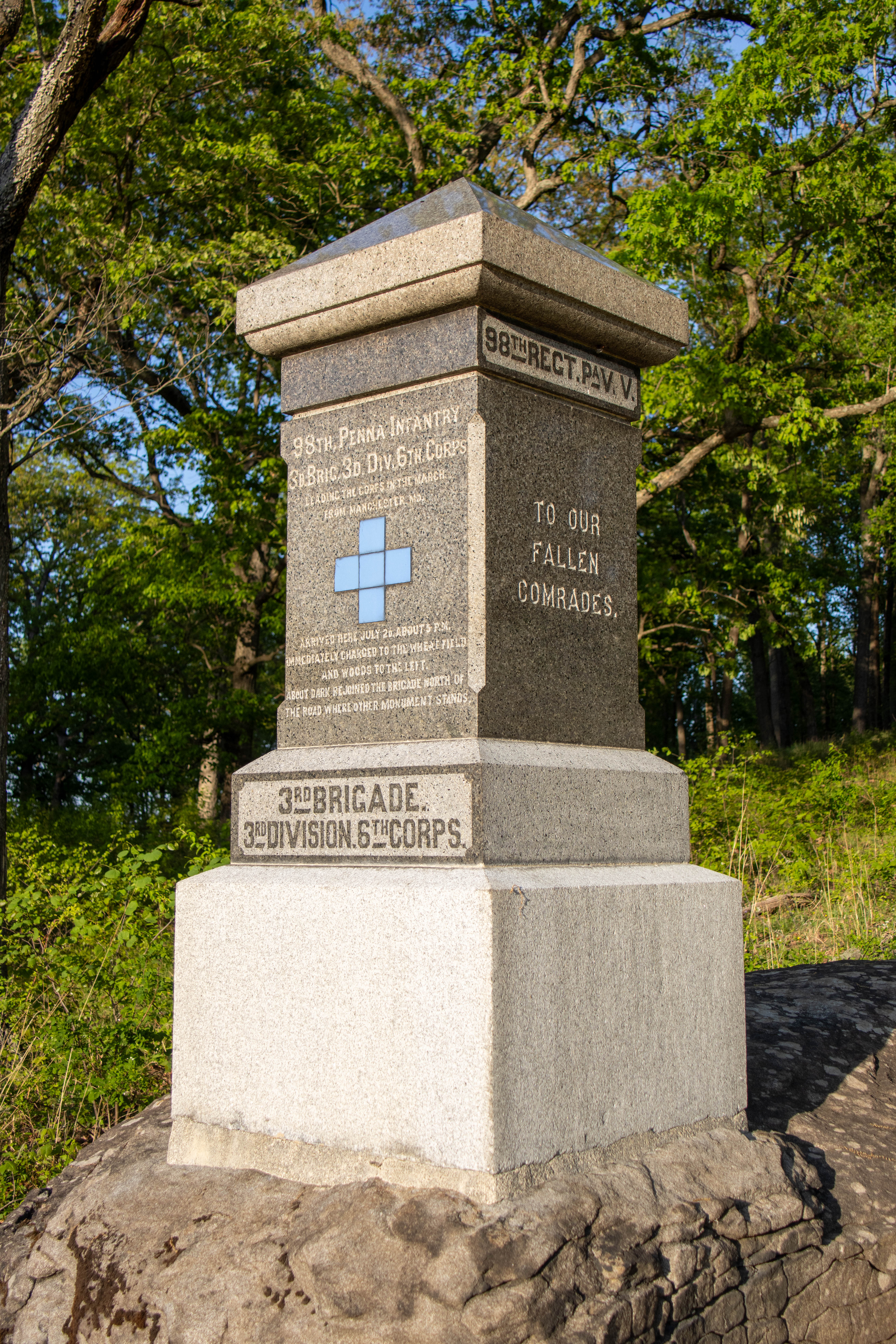
Monument to 98th Pennsylvania Volunteer Infantry Regiment on Little Round Top, Gettysburg

Monuments: The accomplishments and sacrifices of the 98th Pennsylvania have been memorialized via two monuments at the Gettysburg National Military Park. There is also a monument to the 98th PA at Battleground National Cemetery in Washington DC, to honor those who fought at the Battle of Fort Stevens.

Memorials: The website www.98thPVI.com is a website created to compile the history of the regiment as well as to memorialize the individual soldiers.
