= John Tomkins (disambiguation) =

John Tomkins may refer to:

- John Tomkins (composer) (1586-1638), Welsh-born organist and composer
- John Patrick Tomkins, A.K.A "The Bishop," American criminal from Iowa

== See also ==
- John Tompkins (disambiguation)
