= New York City Hall =

Seat of New York City's government

- U.S. National Register of Historic Places
- U.S. National Historic Landmark
- New York State Register of Historic Places
- New York City Landmark
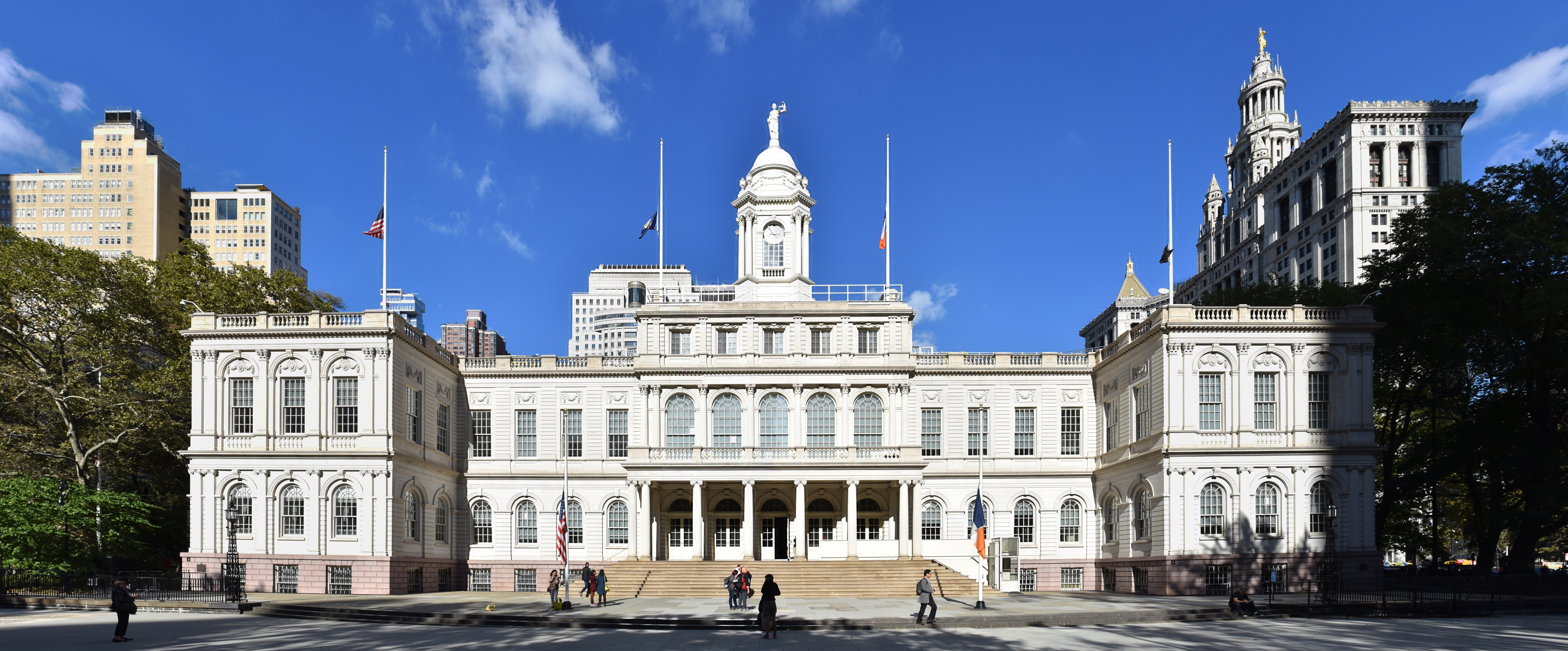
- New York City Hall in October 2016
- Location: City Hall Park between Broadway and Park Row; Manhattan, New York City
- Coordinates: 40.7127°N 74.0059°W
- Built: 1812; 214 years ago
- Architect: Joseph-François Mangin and John McComb Jr.
- Architectural style: exterior: French Renaissance Revival interior: Georgian Revival
- NRHP reference No.: 66000539
- NYSRHP No.: 06101.000408
- NYCL No.: 0080, 0916

Significant dates
- Added to NRHP: October 15, 1966
- Designated NHL: December 19, 1960
- Designated NYSRHP: June 23, 1980
- Designated NYCL: exterior: February 1, 1966 interior: January 17, 1976

New York City Hall is the seat of New York City government, located at the center of City Hall Park in the Civic Center area of Lower Manhattan, between Broadway, Park Row, and Chambers Street. Constructed from 1803 to 1812, the building is the oldest city hall in the United States that still houses its original governmental functions. The building houses the office of the Mayor of New York City and the chambers of the New York City Council. While the Mayor's Office is in the building, the staff of thirteen municipal agencies under mayoral control are located in the nearby Manhattan Municipal Building, one of the largest government buildings in the world, with many others housed in various buildings in the immediate vicinity.

New York City Hall is a National Historic Landmark and is listed on the National Register of Historic Places. The New York City Landmarks Preservation Commission designated both City Hall's exterior and interior as official city landmarks in 1966 and 1976, respectively.

== History ==
=== 17th century ===
New Amsterdam's first City Hall was built by the Dutch Republic in the 17th century near present-day 73 Pearl Street. The first structure was demolished in 1690.

=== 18th century ===
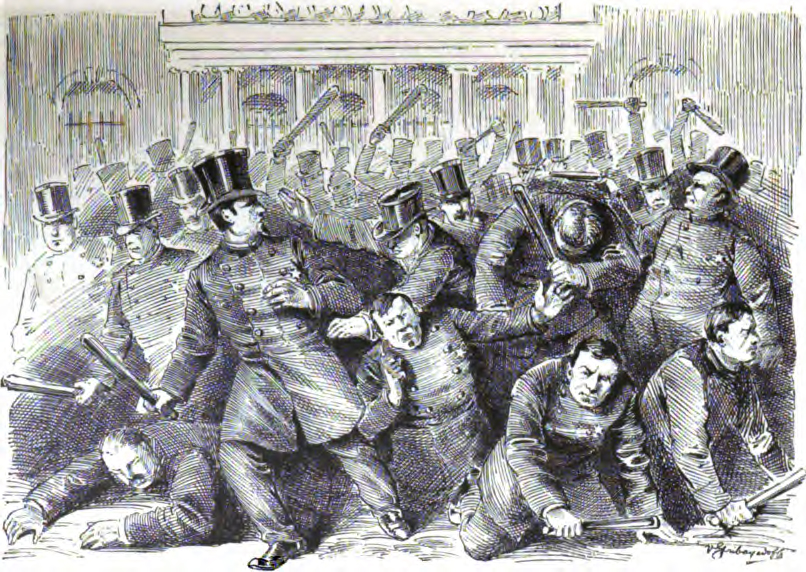
An 1887 illustration of New York City Municipal and Metropolitan policemen rioting and fighting each other in front of New York City Hall in 1857

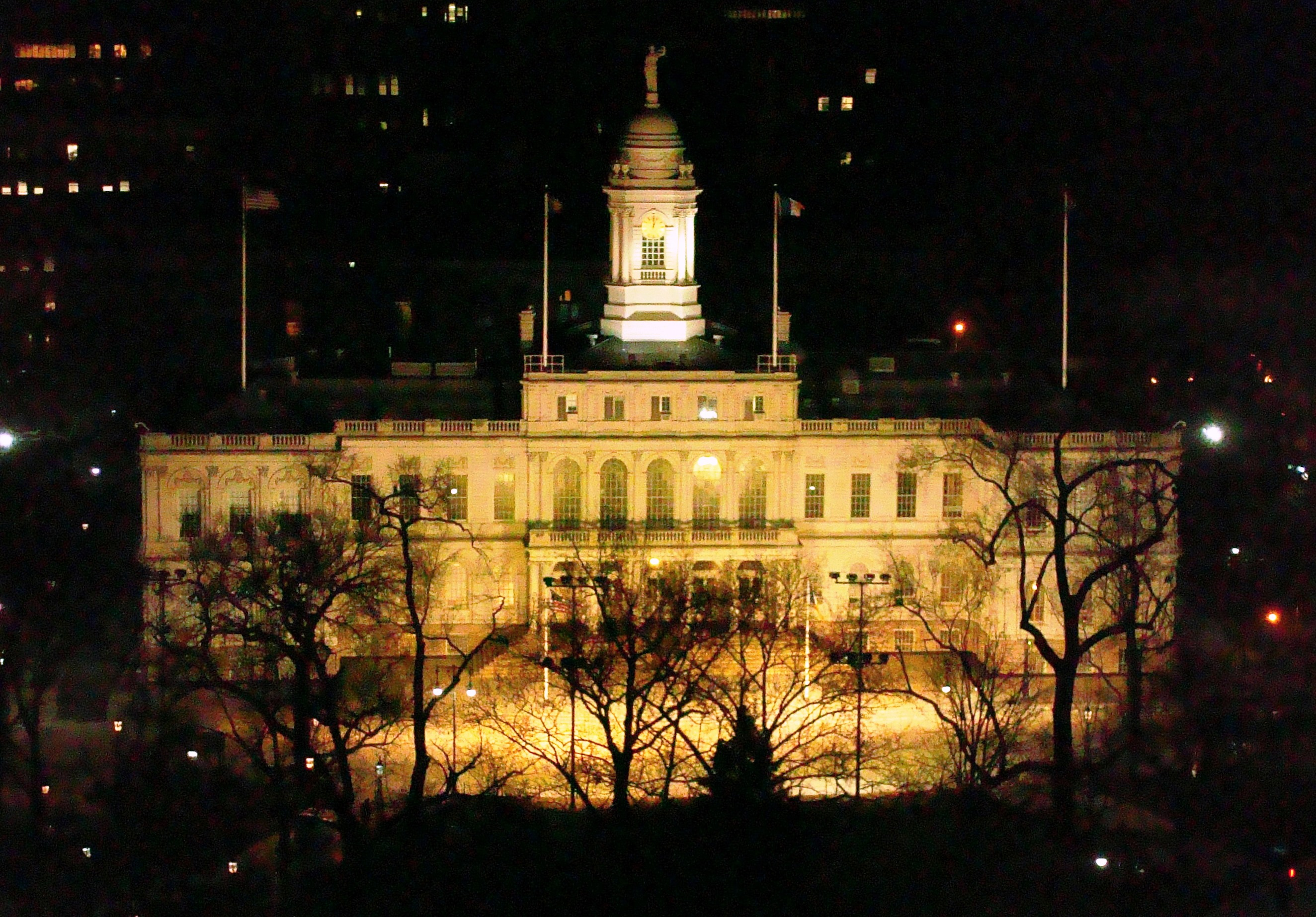
City Hall at night in 2008

The city's second City Hall, built in 1700, stood on Wall and Nassau Streets. That building was renamed Federal Hall in 1789, after New York became the first official capital of the United States after the Constitution was ratified. It was demolished in 1812 and current Federal Hall Memorial was built at this location in 1842.

Plans for building a new City Hall were discussed by the New York City Council as early as 1776, but the financial strains of the war delayed progress. The Council chose a site at the old Common at the northern limits of the city, now City Hall Park. City Hall was originally an area for the first almshouse in 1653. In 1736, there was a financed almshouse for those who were fit to work, for the unfit, and those that were like criminals but were paupers.

=== 19th century ===
In 1802, New York City held a competition for a new City Hall. The first prize of $350 was awarded to Joseph-François Mangin and John McComb Jr. Mangin studied architecture in his native France before becoming a New York City surveyor in 1795 and publishing an official map of the city in 1803 that was largely discredited for its inaccuracies. Mangin later served as the architect of the landmarked St. Patrick's Old Cathedral on Mulberry Street. McComb, whose father had worked on the old City Hall, was a New Yorker and designed Castle Clinton in Battery Park, among other buildings and structures. Mangin had no known involvement with City Hall after winning the commission. McComb alone supervised every aspect of construction and was in charge of the architectural modifications and detailing during the extended building process.

The cornerstone of the new City Hall was laid on May 26, 1803. Construction was delayed after the City Council objected that the design was too extravagant. In response, McComb reduced the size of the building and used brownstone at the rear of the building to lower costs. The brownstone, along with the original deteriorated Massachusetts marble facade, quarried from Alford, Massachusetts, was later replaced with Alabama limestone between 1954 and 1956. Labor disputes and an outbreak of yellow fever further slowed construction. The building was not dedicated until 1811, and opened officially in 1812.

The New York City Police riot occurred in front of New York City Hall between the recently dissolved New York Municipal Police and the newly formed Metropolitan Police on June 16, 1857. Municipal police fought with Metropolitan officers who were attempting to arrest New York City Mayor Fernando Wood.

=== 20th and 21st centuries ===
A project to build a 150-story skyscraper abutting the back of City Hall, proposed and managed by Charles F. Noyes and Schulte Realty, was undertaken in the 1920s, but foundered due to issues with leasing.

In 1953, the city's public works commissioner Frederick H. Zurmuhlen requested $2.2 million to repair City Hall's facade, which was crumbling.

On July 23, 2003, at 2:08 p.m., City Hall was the scene of a rare political assassination. Othniel Askew, a political rival of City Councilman James E. Davis, opened fire with a pistol from the balcony of the City Council chamber. Askew shot Davis twice, fatally wounding him. A police officer on the floor of the chamber then fatally shot Askew. Askew and Davis had entered the building together without passing through a metal detector, a courtesy extended to elected officials and their guests. As a result of the security breach, then-Mayor Michael Bloomberg revised security policy to require that everyone entering the building pass through metal detectors without exception. Davis would lie in state at City Hall, a feat which was not repeated until former U.S. Rep Charles Rangel did so in 2025.

In 2008, work began on a restoration of the building, after a century without a major renovation. The construction included structural enhancements, upgrades to building services, as well as in-depth restoration of much of the interior and exterior. Due to the complexity of the demands of the project, the New York City Department of Design and Construction hired Hill International to provide construction management. Renovations were originally estimated to cost $104 million and take four years, but ended up costing nearly $150 million and taking over five years.

City Hall, Park Row, and City Hall Park in 1911, including the Manhattan station for cable cars, which ran across the Brooklyn Bridge

== Architecture ==
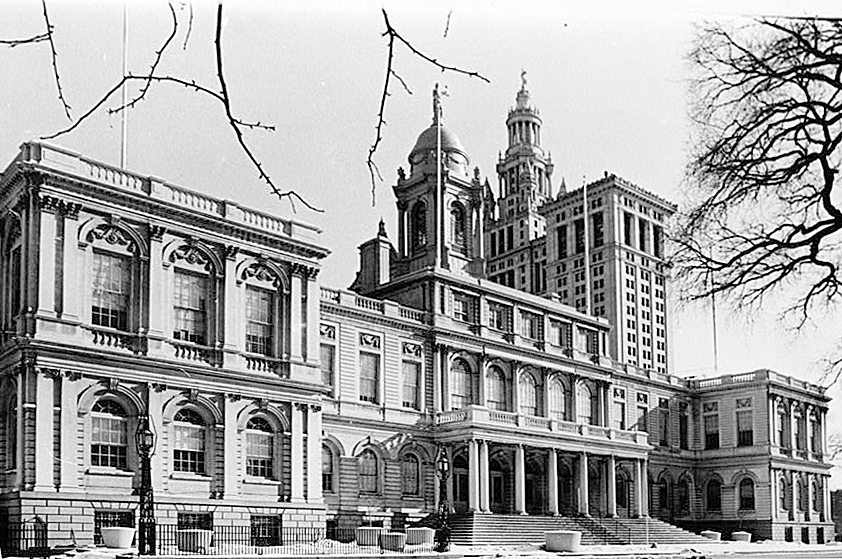
City Hall in the Historic American Buildings Survey with the Manhattan Municipal Building in the background (on the right)

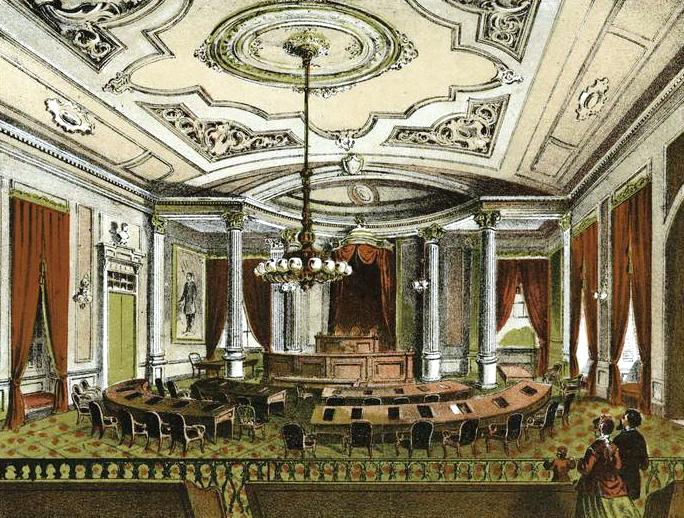
The Chamber of the Board of Councilmen in 1868

Although Mangin and McComb designed the building, which was constructed between 1810 and 1812, it has been altered numerous times over the years by several architects. These include Leopold Eidlitz in 1860, John H. Duncan in 1898, William Martin Aiken in 1903, Grosvenor Atterbury and John Almy Tompkins II from 1907 to 1917, Shreve, Lamb & Harmon in 1956, and Cabrera Barricklo in 1998.

The architectural style of City Hall combines international architectural influences, French Renaissance and English neoclassicism. American-Georgian is more evident in the interior design. City Hall is a New York City designated landmark. It is also listed on the New York State and National Registers of Historic Places.

=== Exterior ===
The building consists of a central pavilion with two projecting wings. The entrance, reached by a long flight of steps, has figured prominently in civic events for over a century and a half. There is a columned entrance portico capped by a balustrade, and another balustrade at the roof. The domed tower in the center was rebuilt in 1917 after the last of two major fires. The original Massachusetts marble facade, quarried from Alford, Massachusetts, and complemented with brownstone on the rear elevation, had deteriorated over time from pollution and pigeons. It was completely reclad in Alabama limestone above a Missouri granite base in 1954–56 by Shreve, Lamb & Harmon, architects of the Empire State Building.

The steps of City Hall frequently provide a backdrop for political demonstrations and press conferences concerning city politics. Live, unedited coverage of events at City Hall is carried on NYC Media channel 74, a City Government-access television (GATV) official cable TV channel.

Fencing surrounds the building's perimeter, with a strong security presence by the New York City Police Department and other security. Public access to the building is restricted to tours and to those with specific business appointments.

=== Interior ===
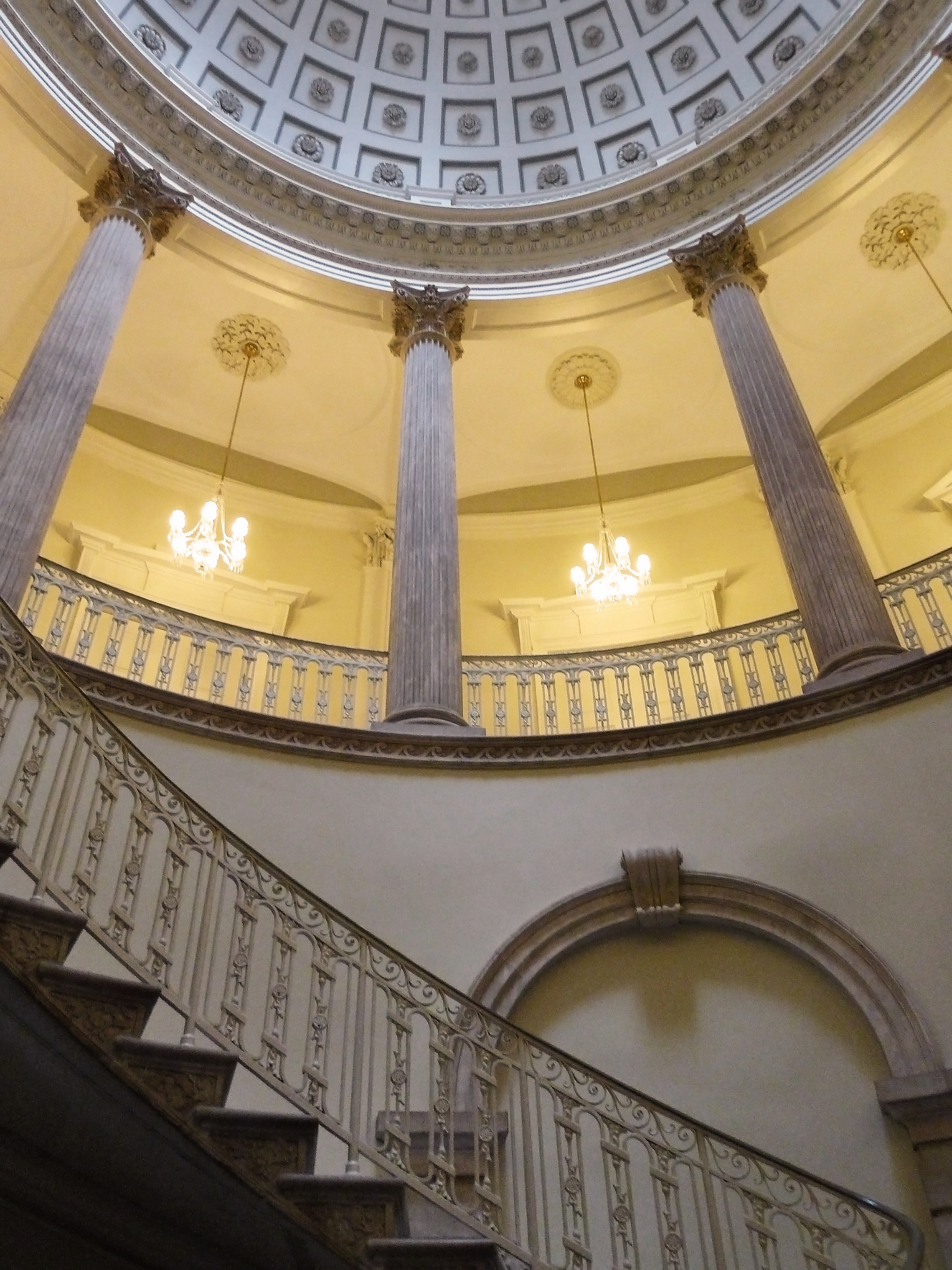
The rotunda of New York City Hall

On the inside, the rotunda is a soaring space with a grand marble stairway rising up to the second floor, where ten fluted Corinthian columns support the coffered dome, which was added in a 1912 restoration by Grosvenor Atterbury and John Almy Tompkins II. The rotunda has been the site of municipal as well as national events. Abraham Lincoln's coffin was placed on the staircase landing across the rotunda when he lay in state in 1865 after his assassination. Ulysses S. Grant also lay in state beneath the soaring rotunda dome – as did Colonel Elmer Ephraim Ellsworth, first Union officer killed in the Civil War and commander of the 11th New York Volunteer Infantry Regiment (First Fire Zouaves).

There are 108 paintings from the late 18th century through the 20th century, which The New York Times declared were "almost unrivaled as an ensemble, with several masterpieces". Among the collection is John Trumbull's 1805 portrait of Alexander Hamilton, the source of the face on the United States ten-dollar bill. There were significant efforts to restore the paintings in the 1920s and 1940s. In 2006, a new restoration campaign began for 47 paintings identified by the Art Commission as highest in priority.

Official receptions are held in the Governor's Room, which has hosted many dignitaries including the Marquis de Lafayette and Albert Einstein. The building's Governor's Room hosted President-elect Abraham Lincoln in 1861. The Governor's Room, which is used for official receptions, also houses one of the most important collections of 19th-century American portraiture and notable artifacts such as George Washington's desk.

Other notable rooms include:

- The Outer Room is adjacent to the traditional Mayor's office, which is a small space on the northwest corner of the first floor
- The Ceremonial Room is where the mayor would meet officials and hold small group meetings
- The Blue Room is where New York City mayors have been giving official press conferences for decades and is often used for bill-signing ceremonies
- Room 9 is the press room at City Hall where reporters file stories in cramped quarters

== Surroundings ==
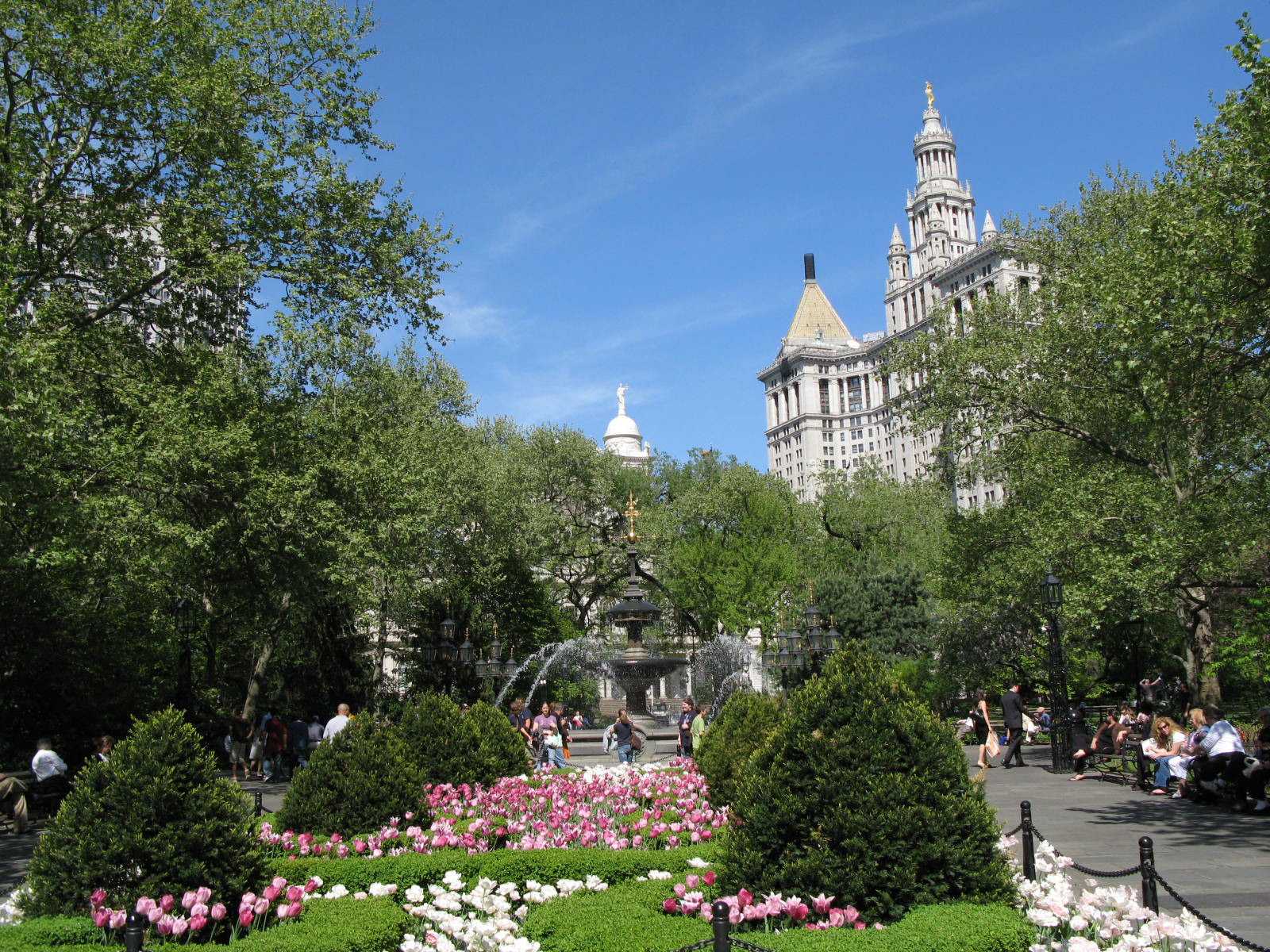
City Hall Park

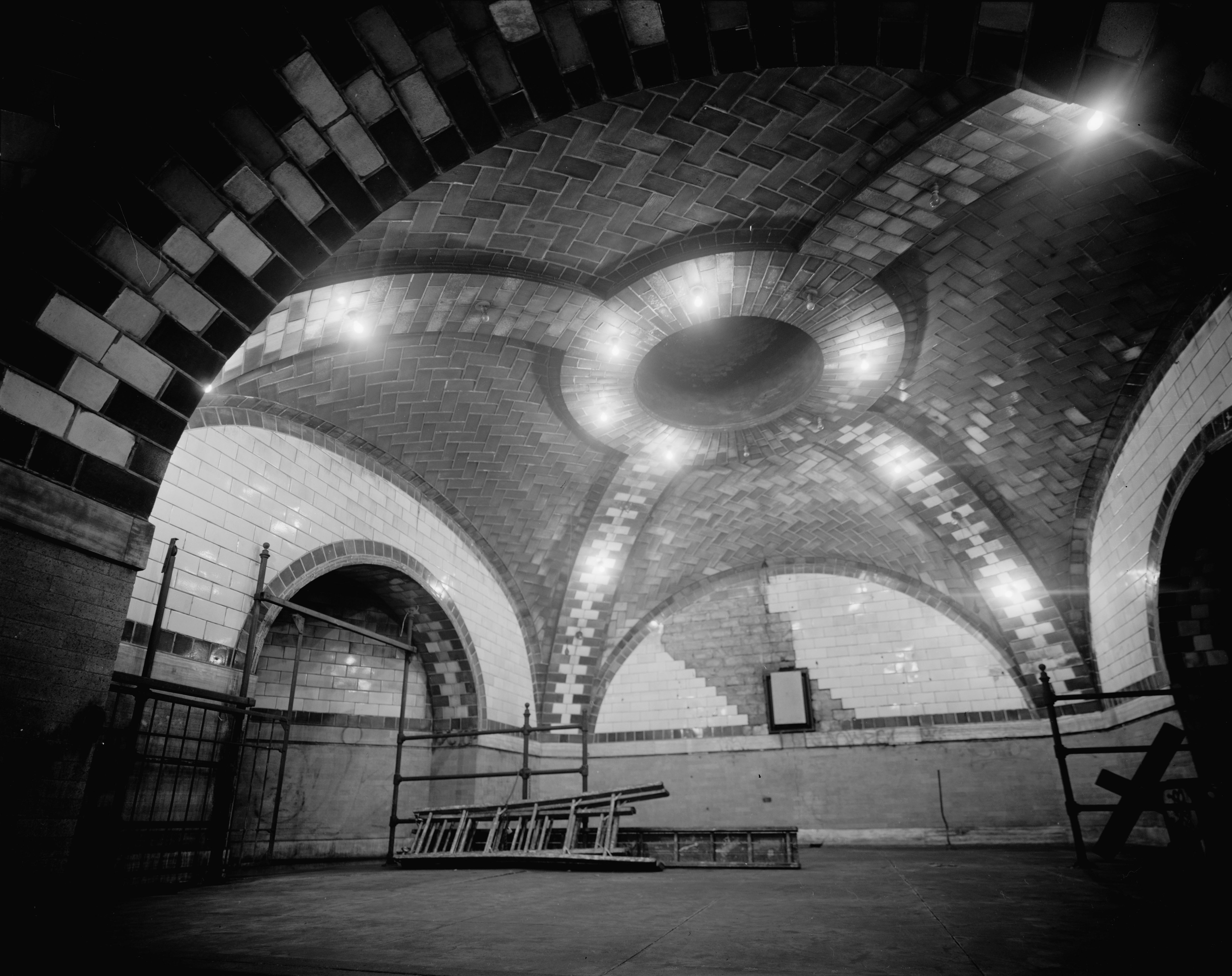
The mezzanine at the subway station underneath City Hall

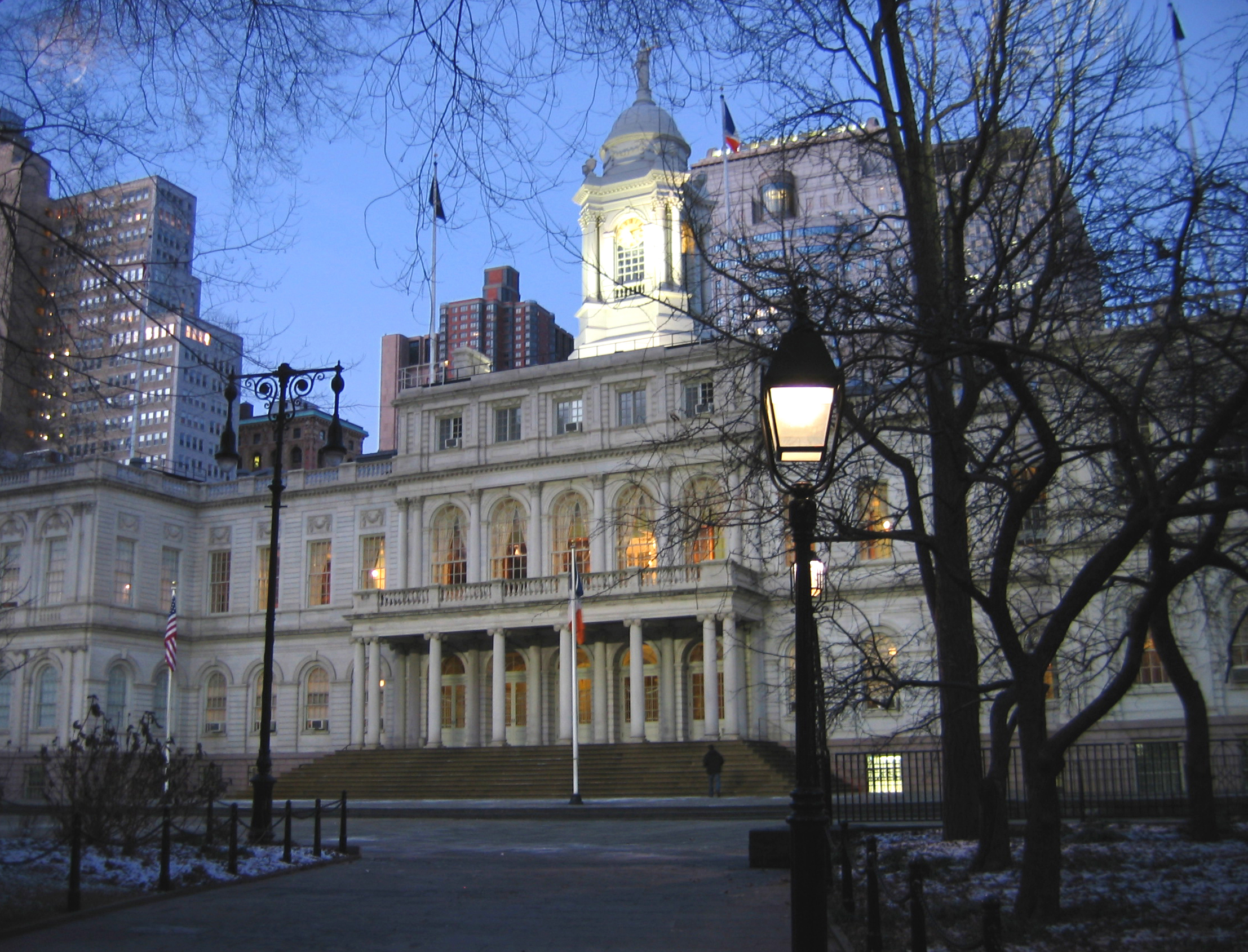
City Hall at dusk in 2007

=== Neighborhood ===
The area around City Hall is commonly referred to as the Civic Center. Most of the neighborhood consists of government offices (city, state, and federal), as well as an increasing number of upscale residential dwellings being converted from older commercial structures. Architectural landmarks surround City Hall, including St. Paul's Chapel, St. Peter's Church, the Home Life Building, the Rogers Peet Building, and the Woolworth Building to the west; the Broadway–Chambers Building to the northwest; 280 Broadway, 49 Chambers, Tweed Courthouse, and Surrogate's Courthouse to the north; the Manhattan Municipal Building to the northeast; the Brooklyn Bridge to the east; and the New York Times Building, the Potter Building, and the Park Row Building to the southwest. City Hall Park is approximately three blocks away from the World Trade Center to the west. Pace University's New York City campus is located across Park Row from City Hall.

=== Subway stations ===
Located directly under City Hall Park is the former City Hall subway station, the original southern terminal of the first service of the New York City Subway built by the Interborough Rapid Transit Company (IRT). Opened on October 27, 1904, this station beneath the public area in front of City Hall was designed to be the showpiece of the new subway. The platform and mezzanine feature Guastavino tile, skylights, colored glass tile work and brass chandeliers. Passenger service was discontinued on December 31, 1945, although the station is still used as a turning loop for 6 and <6> trains.

Another station named City Hall (N, R, and W trains) also exists on the BMT Broadway Line, albeit on the western side of City Hall and not directly under it. This station was built in 1918 for the Brooklyn–Manhattan Transit Corporation (BMT).

Other nearby, open subway stations are Brooklyn Bridge–City Hall/Chambers Street (4, 5, 6, <6>, J, and Z trains) and Chambers Street–World Trade Center/Park Place/Cortlandt Street (2, 3, A, C, E, N, R, and W trains).

== As a geographic center ==
Google Maps uses New York City Hall as the zero-mile point from which distances from New York City are measured.

== See also ==
- List of tallest buildings in New York City
- City Hall Post Office and Courthouse (New York City)—formerly located in the southwest corner of the park
- Gracie Mansion
- List of New York City borough halls and municipal buildings
- List of New York City Designated Landmarks in Manhattan below 14th Street
- National Historic Landmarks in New York City
- National Register of Historic Places listings in Manhattan below 14th Street
