= Francis E. Patterson =

American general (1821–1862)

Francis Engle Patterson
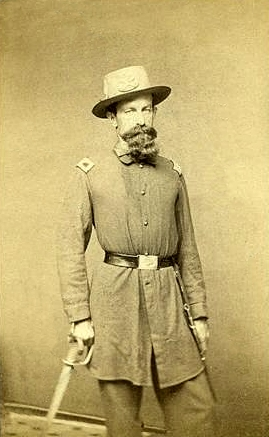
- Patterson c. 1861
- Born: May 7, 1821; Philadelphia, Pennsylvania, U.S.
- Died: November 2, 1862 (aged 41) near Occoquan, Virginia
- Burial place: Laurel Hill Cemetery, Philadelphia, Pennsylvania, U.S.
- Military career
- Allegiance: United States of America; Union
- Branch: United States Army; Union Army
- Service years: 1846–1857, 1861–1862
- Rank: Brigadier General
- Units: 1st U.S. Artillery; 9th U.S. Infantry
- Commands: 17th Pennsylvania Volunteer Infantry; 3rd Brigade, 2nd Division, III Corps, Army of the Potomac
- Conflicts: Mexican–American War; American Civil War; Battle of Williamsburg; Battle of Seven Pines

Francis Engle Patterson (May 7, 1821 – November 2, 1862) was an American military officer who served as a captain in the United States Army during the Mexican-American War and as a Union Army brigadier general during the American Civil War.

== Career ==
Patterson was born on May 7, 1821, in Philadelphia to Irish-American army officer Robert Patterson, himself a general during the Mexican–American War and the Civil War, and Sarah Engle. His brother was brevet Brig. Gen. Robert Patterson, and he was brother-in-law to another Union general, John Joseph Abercrombie. he entered the army during the Mexican-American War, and was commissioned a second lieutenant in the 1st U.S. Artillery (June 24, 1847 October 28, 1847). He was promoted to first lieutenant October 29, 1847. After the war, Patterson transferred to the 9th U.S. Infantry where he was promoted to captain, March 3, 1855; he resigned May 1, 1857.

At the outbreak of the Civil War, Patterson rejoined the army and was commissioned colonel of the 17th Pennsylvania Volunteer Infantry, a ninety-day militia regiment which saw service as guard duty along the Potomac River. He was promoted to brigadier general in the United States Volunteers effective April 11, 1862, and placed in command of the 3rd Brigade, 2nd Division, III Corps, Army of the Potomac.

Patterson led his brigade at Williamsburg and Seven Pines, but during the latter battle, he had to relinquish command due to illness with typhoid fever. He took a leave of absence on June 7 and missed the Seven Days Battles. By July, he was well enough to take on administrative duties at army headquarters. Patterson did not return to field command until the fall months when he resumed command of his old brigade, now in Daniel Sickles' division. However, recurrent ill health continued to plague him.

Patterson was at Catlett's Station when he withdrew his brigade based on unconfirmed reports of Confederate troops nearby. Sickles accused him of retreating without orders and called for a military board of inquiry to court-martial him. However, on November 2, 1862, Patterson was found dead in his tent of a self-inflicted gunshot wound. Initially it was not clear whether his death was accidental or a suicide. But an article in The Baltimore Sun from 29 November 1862 cites an eyewitness, Capt. Vreeland of the 8th New Jersey Volunteer Infantry who was with him in his tent at the time. Vreeland states that Patterson "committed the act while under a temporary insanity ... so suddenly was the rash act committed that (I) could not stay his hand."

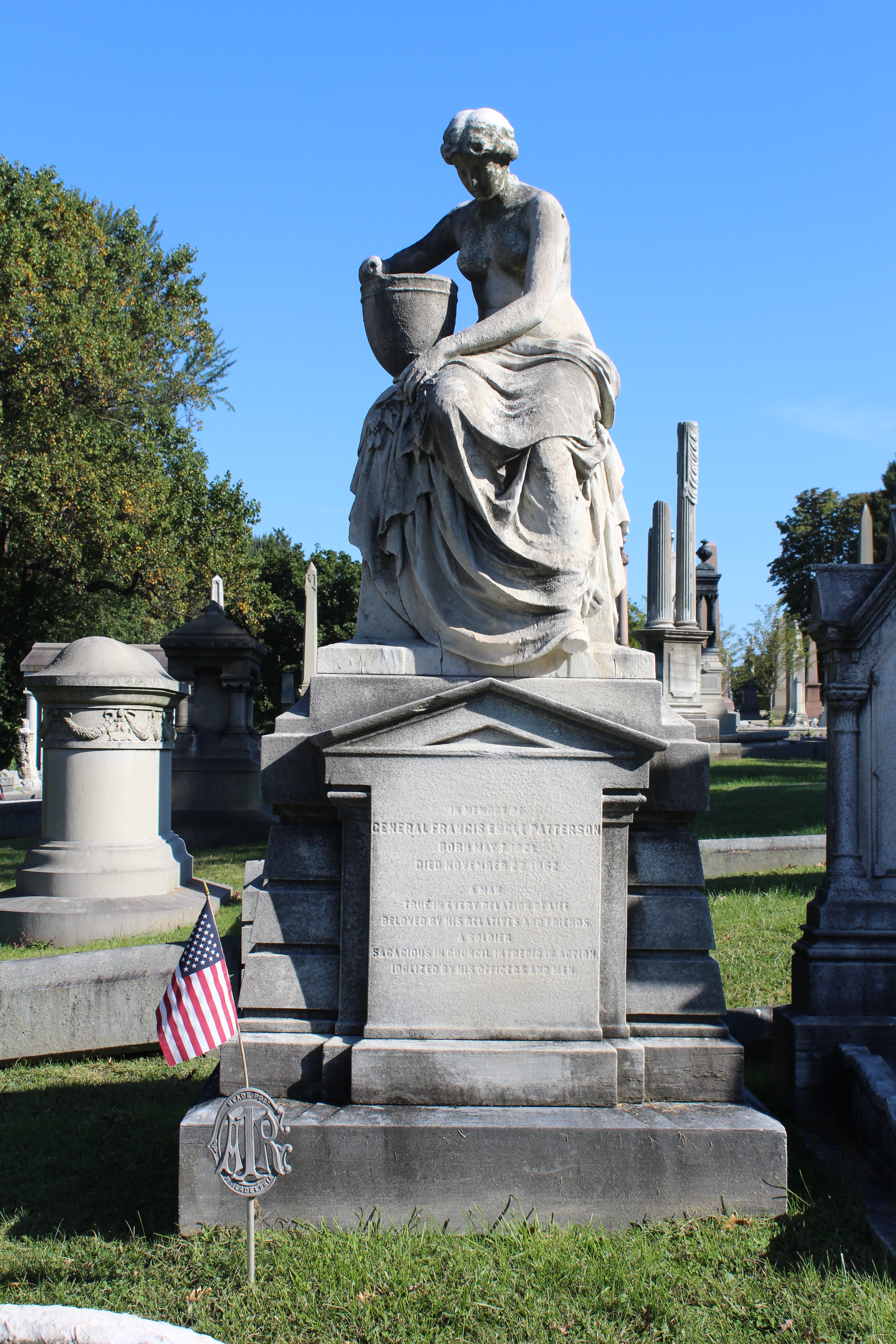
Francis E. Patterson Memorial in Laurel Hill Cemetery

He was interred at Laurel Hill Cemetery in Philadelphia, Pennsylvania next to his father.

== Personal life ==
He was a member of the Friendly Sons of St. Patrick.

== See also ==
- List of American Civil War generals (Union)
