= John F. Ballier =

German-born American military officer (1815–1893)

- Ballier c. 1861–1865

Member of the Philadelphia City Council
- In office 1868–1871

Personal details
- Born: August 28, 1815 Aurich, Kingdom of Württemberg, German Confederation
- Died: February 3, 1893 (aged 77) Philadelphia, Pennsylvania, U.S.
- Resting place: Mount Peace Cemetery, Philadelphia, Pennsylvania

Military service
- Allegiance: United States
- Branch/service: United States Army; Union Army; Pennsylvania National Guard
- Years of service: 1846–1848; 1861–1865; 1869–1876
- Rank: Colonel; Brevet Brigadier General
- Commands: 21st Pennsylvania Infantry Regiment; 98th Pennsylvania Infantry Regiment
- Battles/wars: Philadelphia nativist riots Mexican-American War; American Civil War

John Frederick Ballier (August 28, 1815 – February 3, 1893) was a German-American baker, military officer, and politician.

== Early life ==
Ballier was born on August 28, 1815, in Aurich in the Kingdom of Württemberg, then part of the German Confederation, he was the only boy in his family and the youngest of seven siblings.^{:72} Ballier's father, Matthäus Ballier, and grandfather held the office of village mayor (Schultheiß) in Aurich.^{:72} Ballier worked in Aurich as an apprentice baker before moving to Schorndorf where he worked with a baker's guild.^{:72} Ballier emigrated to the United States with his wife and children in 1838 to Philadelphia where he established a bakery.^{:73}

== Military career ==
=== Militia ===
Ballier was active in the Deutsche Washington Garde (English: German Washington Guard), a local German militia in Philadelphia which consisted of three companies.^{:74} Ballier became a Sergeant for the militia and later became a Lieutenant. Ballier's militia was used to quell the Philadelphia nativist riots in 1844, an anti-Catholic riot which killed several German Catholics.^{:74} Ballier and his militia were later lauded by the German community of Philadelphia for protecting St. John the Evangelist Catholic Church during the riots.^{:74}

=== Mexican-American War ===
Ballier later served in the Mexican–American War from 1846 to 1848 as a First Lieutenant in the 1st Regiment of Pennsylvania Volunteers under the command of Colonel Francis M. Wynkoop. The 1st Pennsylvania Volunteers fought in the Siege of Veracruz, the Battle of Cerro Gordo, and the Siege of Puebla, among others.

=== American Civil War ===
At the outbreak of the American Civil War Ballier volunteered for service in the Union Army with the rank of Colonel and was given command of the 21st Pennsylvania Infantry Regiment nicknamed the "Philadelphia Light Guard".^{:193} Following his 3-month enlistment with the 21st Pennsylvania, Ballier was authorized by the United States War Department to raise a new regiment of Pennsylvania volunteers.^{:463} This new regiment would be the 98th Pennsylvania Infantry Regiment which Ballier would command for the majority of the war.^{:463} While commanding the 98th Pennsylvania Ballier would be wounded twice, once at the Battle of Salem Church^{:465}, and again at the Battle of Fort Stevens.^{:468} Ballier was mustered out of service on June 29, 1865, with the rank of Brevet Brigadier General.^{:469} In 1865 Ballier served as a judge for the military commission which tried Henry Wirz, the commandant of Andersonville Prison, for war crimes.^{:78}

== Later life ==
Following Civil War Ballier owned a hotel and was appointed by President Andrew Johnson as an inspector for the Philadelphia Custom House.^{:79} Ballier resigned from his position at the Philadelphia Custom House after being elected as member of the Philadelphia City Council from 1868 to 1871.^{:79} Ballier continued to serve in the Pennsylvania National Guard from 1869 to 1876 with the rank of Colonel.^{:79} Ballier died on February 3, 1893, he is buried in Mount Peace Cemetery in Philadelphia.

== Legacy ==
Ballier's papers, personal correspondence, and letters are held by the German Society of Pennsylvania which Ballier was the president of. Ballier was a founding member of Philadelphia's Cannstatter Volksfest in 1873, named after the Stuttgart festival of the same name.^{:79} Ballier was an active member of the Grand Army of the Republic and a founding member of GAR Post #228 "John Koltes" named after John A. Koltes who was a personal friend of Ballier and was killed at the Second Battle of Bull Run.
