= Norwood, Rhode Island =

Neighborhood in Warwick, Rhode Island, United States

Coordinates: 41°45′5″N 71°25′40″W

Norwood is a neighborhood in the city of Warwick, Rhode Island. Norwood is bounded by Route 37, the Pawtuxet River, Elmwood Avenue, and Post Road. Such borders mark the area traditionally served by the fire station previously located at the current site of the Norwood Boys & Girls Club.

Norwood was established in 1874, when landscape architects and surveyors Niles B. Schubarth & Co. of Providence were hired by Nathan D. Pierce to lay out its streets. A rail station was built at the same time, connecting the neighborhood to Providence. In the 1880s, it was further connected when Elmwood Avenue was extended from Cranston across the Pawtuxet River to Post Road. Development began to pick up in the 1890s, when the Gorham Manufacturing Co. moved their operations to nearby Cranston.

The Norwood School, originally built soon after 1874, was replaced in 1893 by a new building, itself replaced with the current structure in 1968. The Norwood Public Library, now a branch of the Warwick Public Library, was built in 1923 at 328 Pawtuxet Avenue. The neighborhood is also home to a number of churches. The first, St. William's R. C. Church, was established in 1924 as a mission of St. Matthew's of Cranston. The original building stood at what is today 108 Perry Avenue. This building was torn down when a new one was built at 200 Pettaconsett Avenue in 1960. The other two churches in Norwood are the Norwood Baptist Church and the Rhode Island Central Korean Church. The local Boys and Girls Club is located in the neighborhood. In the center of Norwood is Norwood Field which contains a baseball diamond, a basketball court, a playground, and open lawns.

Post Road is the main thoroughfare through Norwood, and is commercially developed, as are parts of Elmwood Avenue. Both Elmwood and Post (as Broad Street) meet about 4.4 miles north of Norwood and continue on to downtown Providence.

The Norwood Neighborhood Association meets in the Norwood Boys and Girls Club.

== Links ==
A gallery of historic Norwood postcards
