= 21st Pennsylvania Infantry Regiment =

Union Army infantry regiment

21st Pennsylvania Volunteer Infantry
- Pennsylvania flag
- Active: April 20, 1861 – August 9, 1861
- Country: United States
- Allegiance: Union
- Branch: United States Army; Union Army
- Type: Infantry
- Nickname: Philadelphia Light Guard

Commanders
- Colonel: John F. Ballier

The 21st Pennsylvania Volunteer Infantry was a three-month infantry regiment that served in the Union Army during the American Civil War.

== Service ==
This regiment was organized at Philadelphia and mustered into federal service on April 29, 1861. This regiment was the outgrowth of a rifle battalion attached to the 1st brigade, 1st division of the Pennsylvania militia.

On May 20 it was ordered to Suffolk Park; on the 28th to Chambersburg, where it became part of Patterson's army. It crossed the Potomac on June 17, but the force soon returned to the Maryland side and encamped. On July 2 the army moved to Martinsburg and thence after a fortnight, to Bunker Hill, Charlestown, and Harper's Ferry. While in Martinsburg the 21st was presented with a beautiful flag by the loyal Union Germans of that city. On August 9, the 21st boarded trains in Martinsburg, and returned to Philadelphia, via Harpers Ferry and Baltimore. The regiment mustered out at Philadelphia that day.

=== Organizational affiliation ===
Attached to Brig. Gen. George H. Thomas's (Note: An 1840 graduate of West Point and roommate of William T. Sherman, Thomas, a Virginia native remained loyal during the war, would achieve fame as one of the principal commanders in the Western Theater.) 5th Brigade, 1st Division, of Major General Robert Patterson's (Note: The 69-year old Patterson was a Cappagh, County Tyrone, Ireland born United States soldier. The son of a rebel during the 1798 Rebellion who was banished from the United Kingdom, had emigrated to Philadelphia in 1799 with his family. He volunteered for service during the War of 1812, he rose from the rank of captain to colonel in the Pennsylvania Militia, before joining the United States Army. He was discharged in 1815 as a captain. Patterson returned to commercial pursuits in manufacturing and mills, getting involved in Pennsylvania politics. He had a busy commercial and political career but interrupted it again to serve in the Mexican-American War as a major general of volunteers. He saw action during the Siege of Veracruz and at the Battle of Cerro Gordo, where he was wounded. Mustering out, he returned to Philadelphia and resumed his business career becoming quite wealthy. The American Civil War brought Patterson back to military service. He was appointed major general of Pennsylvania volunteers and commanded the Department of Pennsylvania and the Army of the Shenandoah. In 1861, Winfield Scott, now General-in-Chief of the U.S. Army, gave Patterson vague orders to retake Harpers Ferry. Despite inflicting an early defeat on Stonewall Jackson at the Battle of Hoke's Run, he is remembered mostly for crucially failing to stop Confederate General Joseph E. Johnston from joining forces with P. G. T. Beauregard at the First Battle of Bull Run. Although still blamed for this defeat, Brig. Gen. Joseph E. Johnston, however, admit that Patterson's army had largely deterred him from pursuing the U. S. troops in retreat following the battle. Patterson mustered out of the Army in late July 1861.) Army in the Department of Pennsylvania.

Col. Ballier was authorized to recruit another regiment for three years service. This became the 98th Pennsylvania Infantry which included many men of the 21st.

=== List of battles ===
The regiment participated in no battles during its service.

=== Detailed service ===
- Left Philadelphia for Chambersburg, PA, May 28
- Attached to Geo. H. Thomas' Brigade, 1st Division, Patterson's Army, May 28
- March to Greencastle June 6
- Cross Potomac and advance on Martinsburg Road June 15
- At Williamsport June 16–24
- At Downsville till July 1
- Falling Waters July 2
- Occupation of Martinsburg July 3
- Advance on Bunker Hill July 15
- Moved to Charlestown July 17, thence to Harper's Ferry
- Moved by rail to Baltimore to Philadelphia August 9
- Mustered out August 9, 1861.

== Casualties ==
The regiment suffered no losses during its service.

== Regimental staff ==
- Colonel John F. Ballier
- Lieutenant-Colonel Charles Ernenwein
- Major Adolph Mehler

== See also ==
- List of Pennsylvania Civil War Units
- Pennsylvania in the Civil War

== Notes/References ==
Footnotes

Citations

References

- Dyer, Frederick Henry (1908). A Compendium of the War of the Rebellion (PDF). Des Moines, IA: Dyer Pub. Co. pp. 32, 219, 279, 1584. ASIN B01BUFJ76Q. This article incorporates text from this source, which is in the public domain.
- Federal Publishing Company (1908). Military Affairs and Regimental Histories of Maine, New Hampshire, Vermont, Massachusetts, Rhode Island, Connecticut, Pennsylvania, And Delaware (PDF). The Union Army: A History of Military Affairs in the Loyal States, 1861–65 – Records of the Regiments in the Union army – Cyclopedia of battles – Memoirs of Commanders and Soldiers. Vol. I. Madison, WI: Federal Publishing Company. p. 364. OCLC 694018100. This article incorporates text from this source, which is in the public domain.
- Hawks, Steve A. (2009). "21st Pennsylvania Volunteer Infantry Regiment". The Civil War in the East.
- Hawks, Steve A. (2009). "Department of Pennsylvania, April 1861". The Civil War in the East.
- "Robert Patterson". www.aztecclub.com.
- Johnston, General Joseph E. "Official Report, Manassas Campaign".
