= John Almy Tompkins II =

American architect (1871–1941)

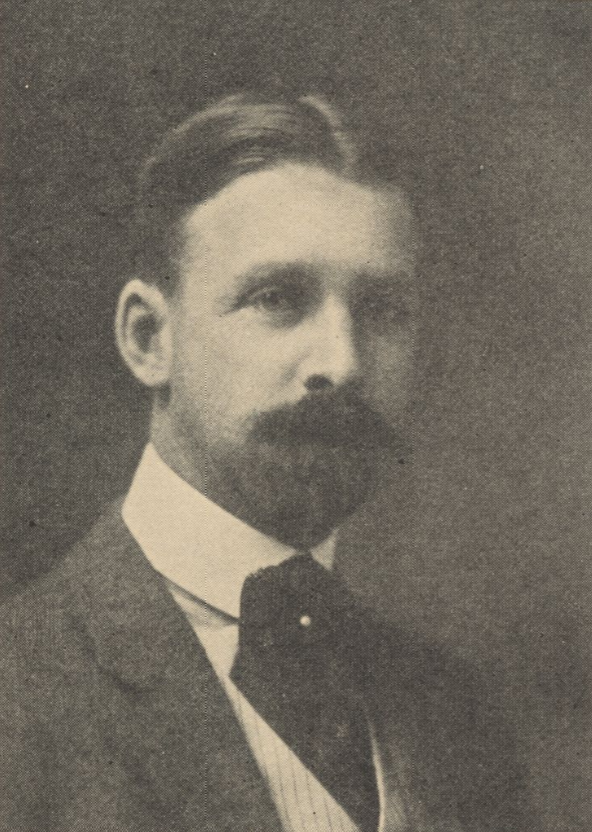
- Born: 1871; Baltimore, Maryland, U.S.
- Died: May 21, 1941 (aged 69–70); Forest Hills, New York, U.S.
- Education: Columbia University School of Architecture
- Occupation: architect

John Almy Tompkins II (1871 – May 21, 1941) was an American architect.

== Early life and education ==
Tompkins was born in 1871 in Baltimore, Maryland to Brevet Brigadier General Charles Henry Tompkins Sr. and Jane Carr Tompkins. His father was a Brevet Brigadier General and Colonel for the Union Army from Rhode Island during the American Civil War. His uncle, John Almy Tompkins was a Lieutenant Colonel for the Union Army during the Civil War as well.

Tompkins attended St. Paul's School in Concord, New Hampshire from 1883 to 1889. He then attended the Columbia Graduate School of Architecture, Planning and Preservation.

== Career ==
His architectural career began in 1894 upon completed of Columbia School of Architecture.

He began the design of the St. Andrews Episcopal Church in New London, New Hampshire in 1905, and completed it in 1909, built in the Gothic architecture style. Tompkins, along with Grosvenor Atterbury, was given the commission for the model housing community of Forest Hills Gardens which began in 1909 under the sponsorship of the Russell Sage Foundation. He worked closely with Grosvenor Atterbury until his retirement in 1937 due to poor health.

In 1912, the Russell Sage Foundation then commissioned them to build their headquarters and annex, which building was completed in 1913. The New York Landmarks Preservation Commission deemed the building a historic landmark on April 25, 2000. In 1915, they completed work on The Church-in-the-Gardens of the Forest Hills housing community. On December 11, 2009, the National Register of Historic Places of the United States Department of the Interior placed the building into the national register due to its cultural and architectural significance in New York City. His work was published in the 1910 edition of The Architectural Review for his design of a lake house at Sebago Lake in Maine.

In 1920 (completed in 1924), they designed the buildings on Surprise Hills Farm (Swiss Village) on Beacon Hill Road, and is now part of Edgehill Farm, in Newport, Rhode Island, inspired by the rural vernacular architecture of Southern France and Northern Italy. The farm buildings are now part

He was a member of the American Institute of Architects (AIA) since 1911 and a Fellow of the American Institute of Architects (FAIA) since 1930.

== Works ==
- American Wing of the Metropolitan Museum of Art.
- Russell Sage Foundation Building.
- West Side Tennis Club.
- Restoration of New York City Hall.
- Phipps Model Apartments.
- St. Andrews Episcopal Church in New London, New Hampshire.
- Housing community center of Forest Hills, Long Island, through the Russell Sage Foundation.
- The Church-in-the-Gardens of Forest Hills, through the Russell Sage Foundation.

== Personal life ==
He died on May 21, 1941 in Forest Hills, New York.
