= Battery A, 1st Rhode Island Light Artillery Regiment =

- Active: June 6, 1861 to September 30, 1864
- Country: United States
- Allegiance: Union
- Branch: Artillery
- Type: Battery
- Equipment: 6 3 inch caliber ordnance rifles
- Engagements: First Battle of Bull Run; Peninsula Campaign; Siege of Yorktown; Battle of Fair Oaks; Seven Days Battles; Battle of Savage's Station; Battle of Glendale; Battle of Malvern Hill; Battle of South Mountain; Battle of Antietam; Battle of Fredericksburg; Second Battle of Fredericksburg; Battle of Gettysburg; Bristoe Campaign; Mine Run Campaign; Battle of the Wilderness; Battle of Spotsylvania Court House; Battle of Totopotomoy Creek; Battle of Cold Harbor; Siege of Petersburg; Battle of Jerusalem Plank Road; First Battle of Deep Bottom; Second Battle of Deep Bottom; Second Battle of Ream's Station

Commanders
- Captain: William H. Reynolds
- Captain: John A. Tompkins
- Captain: William A. Arnold

Battery A, 1st Rhode Island Light Artillery Regiment was an artillery battery that served in the Union Army during the American Civil War.

== Service ==
Battery A, 1st Rhode Island Light Artillery Regiment was organized in Providence, Rhode Island and mustered in for a three-year enlistment on June 6, 1861 under the command of Captain William H. Reynolds.

The battery was attached to Burnside's Brigade, Hunter's Division, McDowell's Army of Virginia, to August 1861. Department of the Shenandoah to October 1861. Banks' Division, Army of the Potomac, to March 1862. Artillery, 2nd Division, 2nd Corps, Army of the Potomac, to June 1863. Artillery Brigade, II Corps, Army of the Potomac, to September 1864.

The original members of the battery, who had enlisted for three years, were mustered out in Providence on June 18, 1864. The remaining members of the battery continued to serve as unit which served in conjunction with Battery B, 1st Rhode Island Light Artillery. The battery ceased to exist on September 23, 1864, when its remaining members were transferred to Battery B, 1st Rhode Island Light Artillery Regiment and Battery A was officially disbanded.

== Detailed service ==
Left Rhode Island for Washington, D.C., June 19. Duty in the defenses of Washington, D.C., until July 16, 1861. Advance on Manassas, Va., July 16–21. Battle of Bull Run July 21. Moved to Sandy Hook, Md., July 28. Duty there and at Berlin and Darnestown until September. Moved to Harpers Ferry September 16. Action at Bolivar Heights October 16. At Muddy Branch and Poolesville, Md., until March 1862. Moved to Washington, then to Hampton, Va., March 22-April 1. Virginia Peninsula Campaign April to August. Siege of Yorktown April 5-May 4. Battle of Fair Oaks (Seven Pines) May 31-June 1. Seven Days Battles before Richmond June 25-July 1. Peach Orchard and Savage Station June 29. Charles City Cross Roads and Glendale June 30. Malvern Hill July 1. At Harrison's Landing until August 16. Movement to Alexandria August 16–28. March to Fairfax Court House August 28–31. Cover retreat of Pope's Army from Bull Run to Washington August 31-September 1. Maryland Campaign September. Battles of South Mountain, Md., September 14, and Antietam September 16–17. Moved to Harpers Ferry September 22, and duty there until October 30. Reconnaissance to Charlestown October 16–17. Action at Charlestown October 16. Advance up Loudoun Valley and movement to Falmouth, Va., October 30-November 17. Battle of Fredericksburg December 11–15. Duty at Falmouth until April, 1863. Chancellorsville Campaign April 27-May 6. Maryes Heights, Fredericksburg, May 3. Salem Heights May 3–4. Gettysburg Campaign June 11-July 24. Battle of Gettysburg July 1–4. Advance from the Rappahannock to the Rapidan September 13–17. Bristoe Campaign October 9–22. Bristoe Station October 14. Auburn Heights October 14. Advance to line of the Rappahannock November 7–8. Mine Run Campaign November 26-December 2. At Stevensburg, Va., until May 1864. Demonstration on the Rapidan February 6–7. Morton's Ford February 6–7. Campaign from the Rapidan to the James May–June. Battles of the Wilderness May 5–7; Spotsylvania May 8–12; Po River May 10; Spotsylvania Court House May 12–21. Assault on the Salient May 12. North Anna River May 23–26. Line of the Pamunkey May 26–28. Totopotomoy May 28–31. Shallow Creek May 31. Cold Harbor June 1–12. Before Petersburg June 16–18. Non-veterans mustered out June 18, 1864. Siege of Petersburg June 16-September 30. Jerusalem Plank Road June 21–23. Deep Bottom July 27–28. Mine Explosion, Petersburg, July 30 (reserve). Strawberry Plains, Deep Bottom, August 14–18. Ream's Station August 25.

== Casualties ==
The battery lost a total of 18 men during service; 1 officer and 12 enlisted men killed or mortally wounded, 5 enlisted men died of disease.

== Commanders ==
- Captain William H. Reynolds - June 6, 1861 to September 16, 1861 (promoted to lieutenant colonel, 1st Rhode Island Light Artillery)
- Captain John A. Tompkins - September 16, 1861 to December 13, 1862 (promoted to major, 1st Rhode Island Light Artillery)
- Captain William A. Arnold - December 13, 1862 to June 18, 1864 (mustered out with the original members of the battery)
- First Lieutenant Gamaliel L. Dwight (interim) - June 18, 1864 to July 7, 1864
- First Lieutenant William S. Perrin - July 7, 1864 to September 23, 1864 (commanded at the First Battle of Deep Bottom)

== Notable members ==
- Corporal Benjamin H. Child - Medal of Honor recipient for action at the battle of Antietam

== Legacy ==
Battery A, 1st Battalion, 103rd Field Artillery of the Rhode Island National Guard traces its origins to this battery. In reality, Battery A is descendant from the Providence Marine Corps of Artillery (PMCA) which was mobilized in 1861 as the 1st Rhode Island Battery and in 1862 as the 10th Rhode Island Battery. Battery A, 1st Rhode Island Light Artillery ceased to exist when it merged with Battery B in 1864. Battery B was mustered out in 1865 and had no direct continuity with the PMCA.

== See also ==
- List of Rhode Island Civil War units
- Rhode Island in the American Civil War
