= John Almy Tompkins =

Union Army Lieutenant Colonel

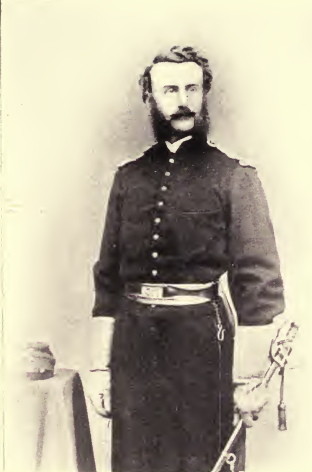
- Born: February 27, 1837; New Windsor, New York, U.S.
- Died: September 30, 1916 (aged 79); Arlington, Virginia, U.S.
- Burial place: Arlington National Cemetery
- Military career
- Allegiance: United States of America; Union
- Branch: United States Army; Union Army
- Service years: 1861-1865
- Commands: Battery A, 1st Rhode Island Light Artillery Regiment
- Conflicts: American Civil War; Antietam; Battle of Gettysburg; Battle of Fredericksburg; Battle of Wilderness

Brevet Lieutenant Colonel John Almy Tompkins (February 27, 1837 – September 30, 1916) was an American officer who served as a Union Army Major in the American Civil War. He was promoted to a Lieutenant Colonel at the end of the war.

== Early life ==
John Almy Tompkins was born on February 27, 1837 in New Windsor, New York to John Almy Tompkins (1803-1838) and Anna Russell Tillinghast.

== Military career ==
On June 6, 1961, he was enlisted into Battery A, 1st Rhode Island Light Artillery Regiment. On September 16, 1861, at Darnestown, Maryland, he was made Captain of his Battery. He commanded the unit during the Maryland Campaign and at the Battle of Antietam.

He wrote an official report of his battery's actions at the Battle of Antietam. Tompkins' Battery was part of the Second Army Corps and was involved in the attack on the Sunken Road, also known as the Bloody Lane. The soldiers under his command fired over 1,000 rounds of ammunition in just 3 hours and engaged in hand to hand combat.

His photograph, uniform frock coat, and accouterments are displayed at the Antietam National Battlefield Museum in Sharpsburg, Maryland.

In addition to Antietam, he fought in many of the most important battle of the Civil War, including the Battle of Gettysburg; Battle of the Wilderness; and the Battle of Fredericksburg. He was promoted to Major on December 4, 1862. On March 26, 1863, he was appointed Chief of Artillery for the Sixth Army Corps where he also served with his brother, Charles Henry Tompkins Sr..

During the Wilderness Campaign, in May 1864, he had become a Major and was placed in command of the Second Brigade of the Army of the Potomac (reserve) Artillery.

On August 1, 1864, he was breveted to Lieutenant Colonel of Volunteers. He was promoted to Lieutenant Colonel on November 1, 1864. He ultimately mustered out of the army in 1865.

He was a member of the Military Order of the Loyal Legion of the United States (MOLLUS), a United States military order organized on April 15, 1865, in the wake of the assassination of President Abraham Lincoln amidst rumors that there was a plot to overthrow the U.S. government.

== After the war ==
After the war, Tompkins gained employment as the Superintendent of the Baltimore Chrome Works.

Tompkins was an auditor with the Public Service Commission of Maryland, up until his death.

== Personal life ==
He married Annie Albertine Shriver, the daughter of Maryland politician, Edward Shriver, in Frederick, Maryland in 1867. Their son, John Almy Tompkins Jr was a prominent doctor in Baltimore, and then a member of the Navy Department’s Bureau of Medicine and Surgery in Washington.

His brother was Brevet Brigadier General Charles Henry Tompkins Sr. and his nephew was architect, John Almy Tompkins II.

He died on September 30, 1916. He was buried in Arlington National Cemetery.
