= 5th Vermont Infantry Regiment =

American Civil War Union Army unit

- Flag of Vermont, 1837–1923
- Active: September 16, 1861 to June 29, 1865
- Disbanded: July 29, 1865
- Allegiance: (United States) United States; Union
- Branch: United States Army; Union Army
- Type: Infantry
- Size: 1,533
- Engagements: Defense of Washington; Siege of Yorktown; Battle of Williamsburg; Battle of Garnett's & Golding's Farm; Battle of Savage's Station; Battle of Antietam; Battle of Fredericksburg; Battle of Chancellorsville; Second Battle of Fredericksburg; Battle of Salem Church; Battle of Gettysburg; Battle of the Wilderness; Battle of Spotsylvania Court House; Battle of Cold Harbor; Siege of Petersburg

Insignia
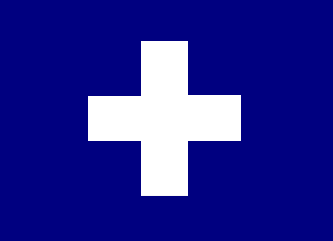
- 2nd Brigade (Vermont Brigade), 2nd Division, VI Corps (Union Army), Army of the Potomac/Army of the Shenandoah (Union)

The 5th Vermont Infantry Regiment was a three years' infantry regiment in the Union Army during the American Civil War. Organized at St. Albans and mustered in September 16, 1861, it served in the Army of the Potomac (AoP). It departed Vermont for Washington, DC, September 23, 1861.

== Service ==
The 5th Vermont Infantry was part of the Army of the Potomac (Aop), in the Vermont Brigade of VI Corps.

The 5th was composed of members from St. Albans, Middlebury, Swanton, Hyde Park, Manchester, Cornwall, Rutland, Brandon, Burlington, Poultney, Tinmouth, and Richmond. It was mustered into federal service in the U. S. Army for three years at St. Albans, Sept. 16, 1861. It was ordered at once to Washington and joined the other Vermont troops at Camp Advance, near the Chain bridge, where it was assigned to the Vermont brigade, with which it served during the remainder of the war.

The fortunes of this brigade were many months of hard fighting and miles of weary marching, but at the end the attainment of lasting renown. Company E, from Manchester, is said to have suffered the heaviest loss of any company from Vermont, and at the Battle of Savage Station on June 29, 1862, the regiment is said to have suffered the heaviest loss in killed and wounded of any one regiment in a single action.

The regiment had its important share in the engagements of the Vermont brigade. It fought all through the Peninsula campaign from Yorktown to the Seven days. During the Maryland Campaign, it was heavily engaged at Antietam. At Fredericksburg, the 5th took part in the assault on Maryes Heights. During Chancellorsville, it was part of the AoP that remained opposite Fredericksburg, taking Maryes Heights on that occasion. It met and repulsed Pickett's Charge with the Vermont Brigade.

It was detached to New York City in response to the draft riots in August 1863 and returned to the AoP to participate in the Bristoe and Mine Run campaigns in the vicinity of the Rapidan and Rappahannock in the autumn of 1863. Early in December 1863, many of the members of the 5th reenlisted. The 5th continued in service as a veteran organization and participated in the bloody Overland Campaign with the AoP from the Wilderness to Cold Harbor, afterward taking part in the siege of Petersburg, where it was active in the operations.

In the summer of 1864, the 5th moved to Washington with VI Corps to confront Maj. Gen. Jubal Early, whose troops threatened the city. It then fought under Sheridan in the Shenandoah. On that campaign, on September 15, 1864, the original members not reenlisted, were mustered out at Clifton. After the successful completion of that campaign, the 5th returned with VI Corps to the Siege of Petersburg in December 1864.

In the final assault on Petersburg, April 2, 1865, the Vermont brigade was in the front of the line, the 5th being the first regiment to reach the enemy's works and there plant its colors. It then joined in the pursuit and after Lee's surrender moved to Danville to cooperate with Maj. Gen. Sherman.

The veterans and recruits were mustered out on June 29, 186529, 1865.

== Regimental Staff ==
Through its service, the staff officers were:

- Colonels—Henry A. Smalley, Lewis A. Grant, John R. Lewis, Ronald A. Kennedy
- Lieutenant-Colonels—Nathan Lord, Jr., Lewis A. Grant, John R. Lewis, Charles P. Dudley, Addison Brown, Jr., Ronald A. Kennedy, Eugene O. Cole
- Majors—Lewis A. Grant. Redfield Proctor, John R. Lewis, Charles P. Dudley, Eugene 0. Cole, Thomas Kavaney

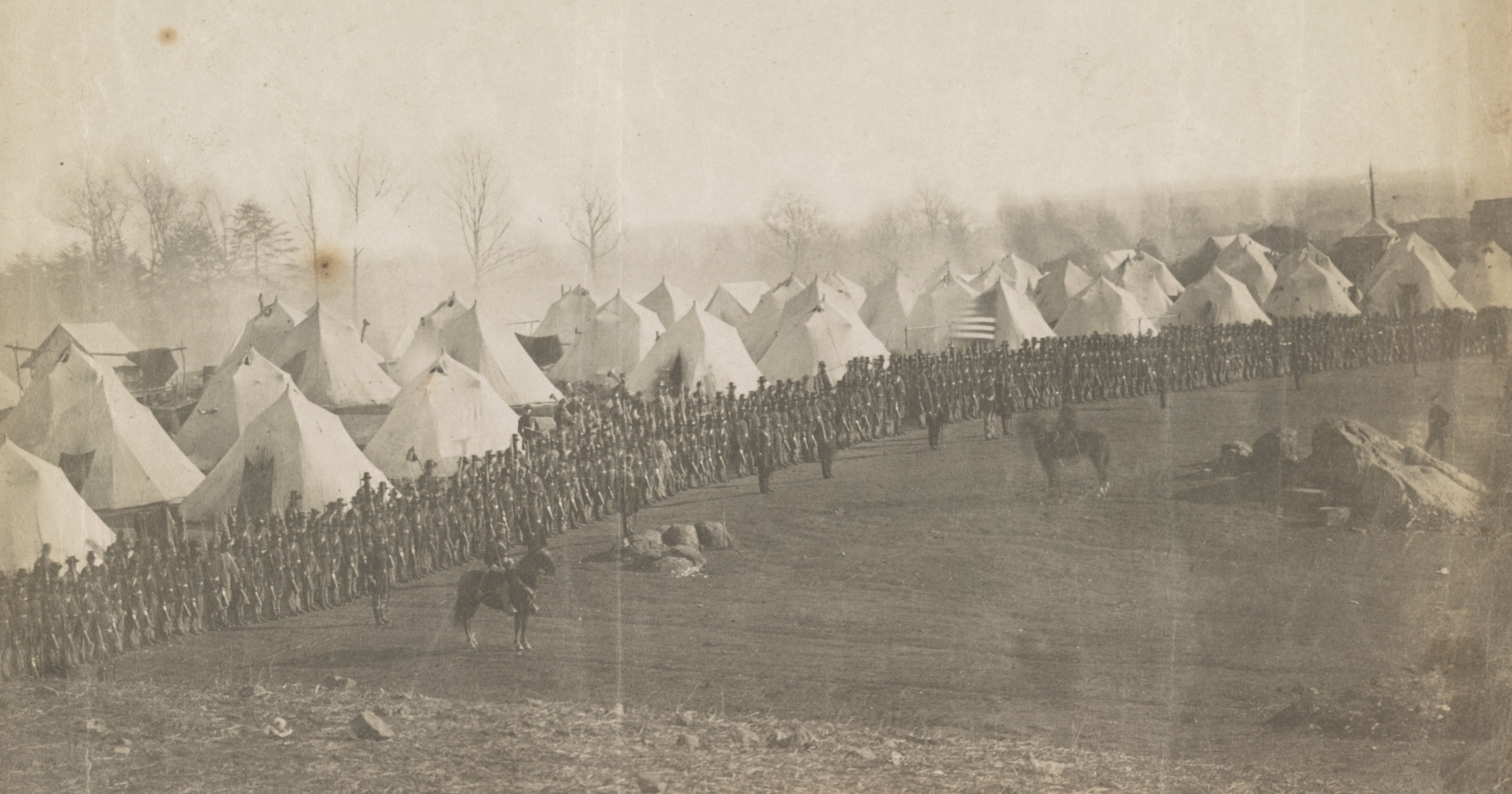
Camp of the 5th Vermont Infantry, Camp Griffin, Va., 1861

== Notable soldiers ==
- Charles G. Gould, Captain and Medal of Honor recipient.
- Lewis A. Grant, Major in the 5th VVI and Medal of Honor recipient.
- Lester G. Hack, Medal of Honor recipient.
- Jackson G. Sargent, Medal of Honor recipient.
- Robert Pratt, Captain in the 5th VVI and Mayor of Minneapolis, MN.

== Affiliations, battle honors, detailed service, and casualties ==
=== Organizational affiliation ===
Its assignments are as follows:

- Attached to Brook's Brigade, Smith's Division, AoP, to March, 1862
- 2nd Brigade, 2nd Division, IV Corps, AoP, to May, 1862
- 2nd Brigade, 2nd Division, VI Corps, AoP, to August, 1863
- Provost of New York City, August to September, 1863
- 2nd Brigade, 2nd Division, VI Corps, AoP, to August, 1864
- 2nd Brigade, 2nd Division, VI Corps, Army of the Shenandoah, Middle Military Division, to December 1864
- 2nd Brigade, 2nd Division, VI Corps, AoP, to June 1865

=== List of battles ===
The official list of battles in which the regiment bore a part:

- Defense of Washington; December 1861 – April 1862
- Siege of Yorktown; | April 5 – May 4, 1862
- Battle of Williamsburg; May 5, 1862
- Battle of Garnett's & Golding's Farm; June 26, 1862
- Battle of Savage's Station; June 29, 1862
- Battle of White Oak Swamp; June 30, 1862
- Battle of Crampton's Gap; September 14, 1862
- Battle of Antietam; September 17, 1862
- Battle of Fredericksburg; December 13, 1862
- Battle of Marye's Heights; May 3, 1863
- Battle of Salem Church; May 4, 1863
- Second Battle of Fredericksburg; June 5, 1863
- Battle of Gettysburg; July 3, 1863
- Battle of Funkstown; July 10, 1863
- Second Battle of Rappahannock Station; November 7, 1863
- Battle of the Wilderness; May 5–10, 1864
- Battle of Spotsylvania; May 10–18, 1864
- Battle of Cold Harbor; June 1–12, 1864
- Second Battle of Petersburg; June 18, 1864
- Battle of Reams' Station; June 29, 1864
- Fort Stevens (Washington, D.C.); July 11, 1864
- Battle of Charlestown; August 21, 1864
- Battle of Opequon (Gilbert's Ford) September 13, 1864
- Battle of Winchester (Opequon); September 19, 1864
- Battle of Fisher's Hill; September 21–22, 1864
- Battle of Cedar Creek; October 19, 1864
- Siege of Petersburg;| March 25, 1865
- Third Battle of Petersburg April 2, 1865

=== Detailed service ===
==== 1861 ====
- At Camp Griffin, Defenses of Washington till March 10, 1862

==== 1862 ====
- Moved to Alexandria, VA March 10
- The Peninsula Campaign, March 17-July 3, 1862
  - To Fortress Monroe, VA March 23–24
  - Reconnaissance to Warwick River March 30
  - Young's Mills April 4
  - Siege of Yorktown April 5-May 4
  - Lee's Mills April 16
  - Battle of Williamsburg May 5
  - The Seven Days Battles June 25-July 1
    - Garnett's Farm June 27
    - Savage Station June 29
    - White Oak Swamp Bridge June 30
    - Malvern Hill July 1
- At Harrison's Landing till August 16
- Moved to Fortress Monroe, thence to Alexandria, August 16–24
- The Maryland Campaign September 4–20,
  - Crampton's Pass, September 14
  - Battle of Antietam September 16–17
- At Hagerstown, MD, September 26- October 29
- Movement to Falmouth, VA, October 29- November 19
- Battle of Fredericksburg December 12–15

==== 1863 ====
- Burnside's Second Campaign, Mud March, January 20–24
- The Chancellorsville Campaign April 27- May 6
  - Operations at Franklin's Crossing April 29-May 2
  - Maryes Heights, Fredericksburg, May 3
  - Salem Heights lay 3-4
  - Banks' Ford May 4
- Franklin's Crossing June 5–12
- Battle of Gettysburg, PA, July 2–4
- Funkstown, MD, July 10–13
- Detached from Army for duty at New York City and Kingston, NY, August 14- September 16
- Rejoined army at Culpeper Court House, VA, September 23
- The Bristoe Campaign October 9–22
- Advance to line of the Rappahannock, November 7–8
- Rappahannock Station, November 7
- The Mine Run Campaign November 26-December 2

==== 1864 ====
- The Overland Campaign May 12-June 24
  - The Battle of the Wilderness May 5–10
  - Battle of Spotsylvania May 10–18
  - Battle of Cold Harbor June 1–12
  - Second Battle of Petersburg, June 18
  - Battle of Reams' Station, June 29
- Repulse of Early's attack on Washington, DC, July 11–12
  - Battle of Fort Stevens July 11
- Sheridan's Shenandoah Valley Campaign August 7- November 28
  - Near Charlestown August 21–22
  - Gilbert's Ford, Opequan Creek, September 13
  - Battle of Opequan (Third Winchester), September 19
  - Fisher's Hill September 22
  - Mustered out non-veterans October 14, 1864
  - Battle of Cedar Creek October 19
- At Strasburg till November 9
- At Kernstown till December 9
- Moved to Petersburg, December 9–12
- Siege of Petersburg December 13, 1864, to April 2, 1865

==== 1865 ====
- Before Petersburg, March 25, 1865
  - The Appomattox Campaign March 28-April 9
  - Assault on and fall of Petersburg April 2
  - Sailor's Creek April 6
  - Appomattox Court House April 9
  - Surrender of Lee and his army
- At Farmville and Burkesville Station till April 23
- March to Danville April 23–27, and duty there till May 18
- Moved to Manchester, thence march to Washington, D. C., May 24-June 8
- Corps Review June 8
- Mustered out the remaining regiment June 29, 1865.

=== Casualties and total strength ===
The 5th Vermont's original strength was 986. Regiment lost during service 11 Officers and 202 Enlisted men killed and mortally wounded and 1 Officer and 124 Enlisted by disease. Total 340. (Note: The regiment lost 136 KIA, 65 mortally wounded, 112 dead of disease,21 dead in Confederate prisons, 1 executed, and 4 dead from accident.) Over the course of their service the regiment saw 8 promoted to other regiments, 447 honorably discharged, 12 dishonorably discharged, 98 deserted, and 8 missing in action. During its service, 91 of the men transferred to the Veteran Reserve Corps and other organizations. The 5th had 615 men muster out at various times, 140 taken prisoner, and 476 wounded.

== Armament ==
Soldiers in the 5th Vermont were armed through the war with model 1855, 1861 National Armory (NA) and contract (Note: In government records, National Armory refers to one of three United States Armory and Arsenals, the Springfield Armory, the Harpers Ferry Armory, and the Rock Island Arsenal. Rifle-muskets, muskets, and rifles were manufactured in Springfield and Harper's Ferry before the war. When the Rebels destroyed the Harpers Ferry Armory early in the American Civil War and stole the machinery for the Confederate central government-run Richmond Armory, the Springfield Armory was briefly the only government manufacturer of arms, until the Rock Island Arsenal was established in 1862. During this time production ramped up to unprecedented levels ever seen in American manufacturing up until that time, with only 9,601 rifles manufactured in 1860, rising to a peak of 276,200 by 1864. These advancements would not only give the Union a decisive technological advantage over the Confederacy during the war but served as a precursor to the mass production manufacturing that contributed to the post-war Second Industrial Revolution and 20th century machine manufacturing capabilities. American historian Merritt Roe Smith has drawn comparisons between the early assembly machining of the Springfield rifles and the later production of the Ford Model T, with the latter having considerably more parts, but producing a similar numbers of units in the earliest years of the 1913–1915 automobile assembly line, indirectly due to mass production manufacturing advancements pioneered by the armory 50 years earlier. These rifles were also produced by contracted commercial arms compnies who, by the contract, had to meet the NA manufacturing specifications.) The regiment reported the following surveys:

=== Ordnance Surveys ===
Survey for Fourth Quarter, 1862'

- A — 44 Springfield Rifled Muskets, model 1855, 1861, NA and contract, (.58 Cal.)
- B — 35 Springfield Rifled Muskets, model 1855, 1861, NA and contract, (.58 Cal.)
- C — 48 Springfield Rifled Muskets, model 1855, 1861, NA and contract, (.58 Cal.)
- D — 43 Springfield Rifled Muskets, model 1855, 1861, NA and contract, (.58 Cal.)
- E — 27 Springfield Rifled Muskets, model 1855, 1861, NA and contract, (.58 Cal.)
- F — 44 Springfield Rifled Muskets, model 1855, 1861, NA and contract, (.58 Cal.)
- G — 41 Springfield Rifled Muskets, model 1855, 1861, NA and contract, (.58 Cal.)
- H — 29 Springfield Rifled Muskets, model 1855, 1861, NA and contract, (.58 Cal.)
- I — 43 Springfield Rifled Muskets, model 1855, 1861, NA and contract, (.58 Cal.)
- K — 31 Springfield Rifled Muskets, model 1855, 1861, NA and contract, (.58 Cal.)

Survey for First Quarter, 1863'

- A — 44 Springfield Rifled Muskets, model 1855, 1861, NA and contract, (.58 Cal.)
- B — 37 Springfield Rifled Muskets, model 1855, 1861, NA and contract, (.58 Cal.)
- C — 53 Springfield Rifled Muskets, model 1855, 1861, NA and contract, (.58 Cal.)
- D — 43 Springfield Rifled Muskets, model 1855, 1861, NA and contract, (.58 Cal.)
- E — 25 Springfield Rifled Muskets, model 1855, 1861, NA and contract, (.58 Cal.)
- F — 46 Springfield Rifled Muskets, model 1855, 1861, NA and contract, (.58 Cal.)
- G — 44 Springfield Rifled Muskets, model 1855, 1861, NA and contract, (.58 Cal.)
- H — 29 Springfield Rifled Muskets, model 1855, 1861, NA and contract, (.58 Cal.)
- I — 30 Springfield Rifled Muskets, model 1855, 1861, NA and contract, (.58 Cal.)
- K — 33 Springfield Rifled Muskets, model 1855, 1861, NA and contract, (.58 Cal.)

Survey for Third Quarter, 1863'

- A — 39 Springfield Rifled Muskets, model 1855, 1861, NA and contract, (.58 Cal.)
- B — 25 Springfield Rifled Muskets, model 1855, 1861, NA and contract, (.58 Cal.)
- C — 49 Springfield Rifled Muskets, model 1855, 1861, NA and contract, (.58 Cal.)
- D — 49 Springfield Rifled Muskets, model 1855, 1861, NA and contract, (.58 Cal.)
- E — 40 Springfield Rifled Muskets, model 1855, 1861, NA and contract, (.58 Cal.)
- F — 23 Springfield Rifled Muskets, model 1855, 1861, NA and contract, (.58 Cal.)
- G — 37 Springfield Rifled Muskets, model 1855, 1861, NA and contract, (.58 Cal.)
- H — 29 Springfield Rifled Muskets, model 1855, 1861, NA and contract, (.58 Cal.)
- I — 20 Springfield Rifled Muskets, model 1855, 1861, NA and contract, (.58 Cal.)
- K — 31 Springfield Rifled Muskets, model 1855, 1861, NA and contract, (.58 Cal.)

Survey for Fourth Quarter, 1864'

- A — 15 Springfield Rifled Muskets, model 1855, 1861, NA and contract, (.58 Cal.)
- B — 15 Springfield Rifled Muskets, model 1855, 1861, NA and contract, (.58 Cal.)
- C — 18 Springfield Rifled Muskets, model 1855, 1861, NA and contract, (.58 Cal.)
- D — 20 Springfield Rifled Muskets, model 1855, 1861, NA and contract, (.58 Cal.)
- E — 17 Springfield Rifled Muskets, model 1855, 1861, NA and contract, (.58 Cal.)
- F — 13 Springfield Rifled Muskets, model 1855, 1861, NA and contract, (.58 Cal.)
- G — 17 Springfield Rifled Muskets, model 1855, 1861, NA and contract, (.58 Cal.)
- H — 15 Springfield Rifled Muskets, model 1855, 1861, NA and contract, (.58 Cal.)
- I — 5 Springfield Rifled Muskets, model 1855, 1861, NA and contract, (.58 Cal.)
- K — 10 Springfield Rifled Muskets, model 1855, 1861, NA and contract, (.58 Cal.)

=== Shoulder Arms ===
Issued weapons

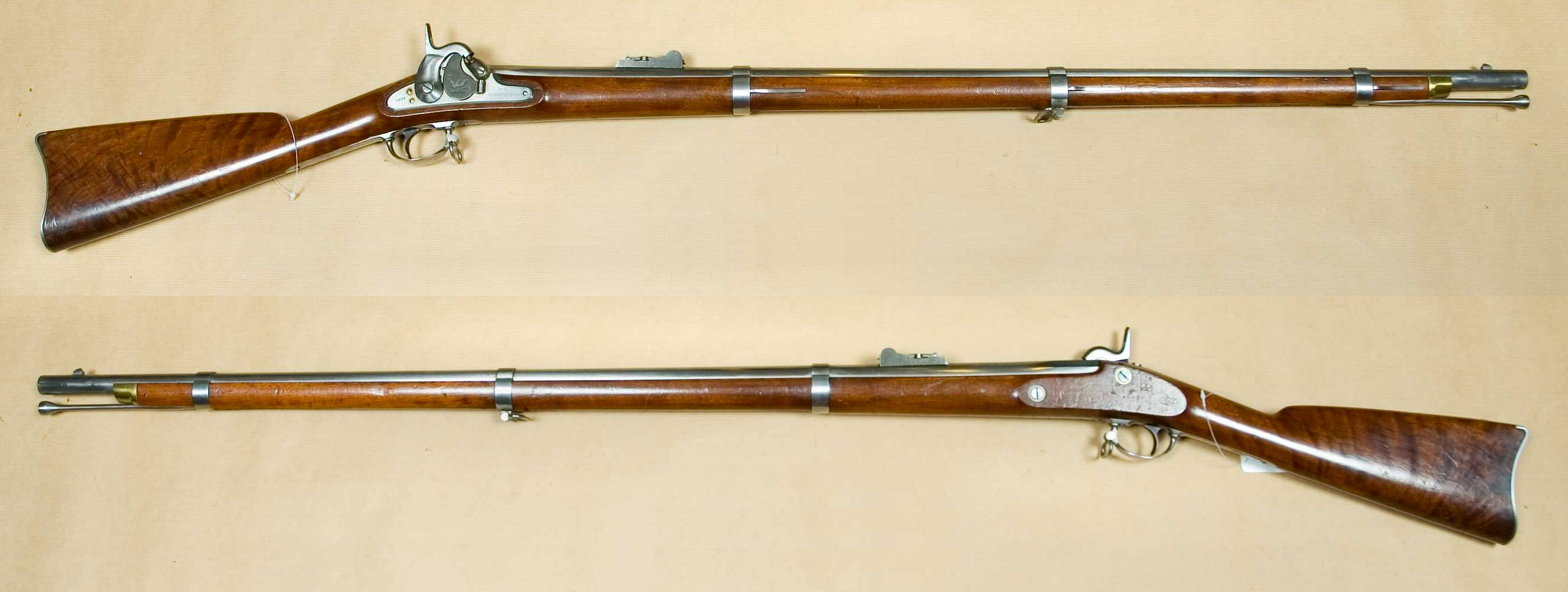
Springfield Model 1855

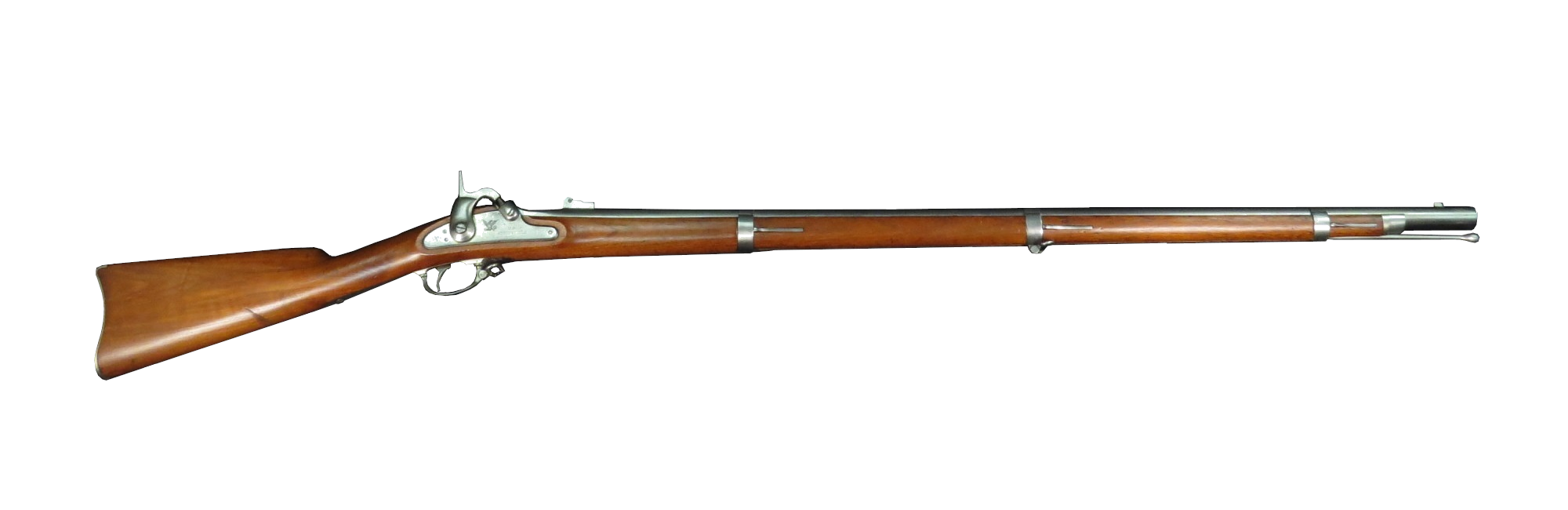
Springfield Model 1861

== See also ==
- Vermont in the Civil War
- Vermont Brigade
