= Lewis A. Grant =

American soldier (1828–1918)

Lewis Addison Grant
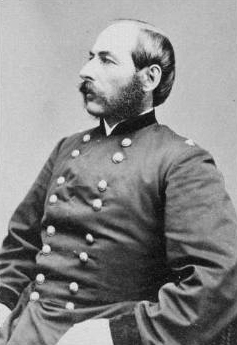
- Born: January 17, 1828; Winhall, Vermont, U.S.
- Died: March 20, 1918 (aged 90); Minneapolis, Minnesota, U.S.
- Burial place: Lakewood Cemetery Minneapolis, Minnesota
- Military career
- Allegiance: United States of America; Union
- Branch: United States Army; Union Army
- Service years: 1861–1866
- Rank: Brigadier general Brevet Major General
- Unit: 1st Vermont Brigade
- Commands: 5th Vermont Infantry; 1st Vermont Brigade
- Conflicts: American Civil War
- Awards: Medal of Honor
- Other work: Assistant Secretary of War

Lewis Addison Grant (January 17, 1828 – March 20, 1918) was a teacher, lawyer, soldier in the Union Army during the American Civil War, and later United States Assistant Secretary of War. He was among the leading officers from the state of Vermont, and received the Medal of Honor for "personal gallantry and intrepidity."

== Early life ==
Grant was born in Winhall, Vermont, the son of James and Elizabeth (Wyman) Grant. He attended the district school of Townshend, Vermont, and the academy at Chester, Vermont. He then taught school for five years in New Jersey, in Chester, Vermont, and near Boston, meanwhile reading law. He was admitted to the bar in 1855 and established his law practice in Bellows Falls, Vermont.

== Civil War ==
Grant was mustered into the service of the United States on September 16, 1861, at St. Albans, Vermont, as major of the 5th Vermont Infantry. He was promoted to lieutenant colonel on September 25, 1861, and colonel, on September 16, 1862. He was wounded at the Battle of Fredericksburg. He assumed command of the famed Vermont Brigade and led it during the 1863 Gettysburg campaign.

Grant was appointed brigadier general of volunteers on April 27, 1864, and accepted the appointment May 21, 1864. He was commissioned brevet major general of volunteers, to date from October 19, 1864, "for gallant and meritorious services in the campaign before Richmond, Virginia, and in the Shenandoah Valley;" and was honorably discharged from the service August 24, 1865.

He commanded the 2nd Brigade, 2nd Division, VI Corps, from February 21, 1863, to December 29, 1863, and from February 2, 1864, to September 29, 1864, and from October 8, 1864, to December 2, 1864; the 2nd Division, VI Corps, from December 2, 1864, to February 11, 1865; the 2nd Brigade, same Division, from February 11, 1865, to February 20, 1865, and from March 7, 1865, to June 28, 1865.

During his service with the 5th Vermont Infantry, he participated in the following battles: Yorktown, Williamsburg, Goldings's Farm, Savage's Station, White Oak Swamp, Crampton's Gap, Antietam, and Fredericksburg.

As a brigade or acting division commander, he participated in the following: the Second Battle of Fredericksburg and the Battle of Salem Church, Gettysburg, Fairfield, Second Battle of Rappahannock Station, the Mine Run Campaign, the Wilderness, Spotsylvania Court House, Cold Harbor, Siege of Petersburg, Charlestown, West Virginia, Gilbert's Crossing, Cedar Creek, the siege and assault on Petersburg (where he was wounded in the head), and the Battle of Sayler's Creek during the Appomattox Campaign. Grant was acting commander of 2nd Division, VI Corps, at the height of its stand against the Confederate assault at Cedar Creek.

He was recommended August 22, 1866, for appointment as a field officer in the regular army by General Ulysses S. Grant (no relation), and was appointed August 29, 1866, as lieutenant colonel of the 36th U.S. Infantry, to date from July 28, 1866, but declined the appointment.

On May 11, 1893, Grant was awarded the Medal of Honor for "Personal gallantry and intrepidity displayed in the management of his brigade and in leading it in the assault in which he was wounded," at Salem Church, Virginia, May 3, 1863. That same year, he became a member of the District of Columbia Society of the Sons of the American Revolution. He was assigned national membership number 6939 and district membership number 439. He was also a companion of the Minnesota Commandery of the Military Order of the Loyal Legion of the United States.

== Post war ==
After the war, Lewis Grant lived in Illinois, Iowa, and finally Minnesota. His son was Ulysses Sherman Grant, professor of geology, at Northwestern University. He was Assistant U.S. Secretary of War during the administration of President Benjamin Harrison. He died at Minneapolis, Minnesota, and is buried in Lakewood Cemetery (Section 8, Lot 416, Grave 2) in that city.

== Medal of Honor citation ==
Rank and organization: Colonel, 5th Vermont Infantry. Place and date: At Salem Heights, Va., May 3, 1863. Entered service at: Bellow Falls, Vt. Born: January 17, 1828, Winhall, Vt. Date of issue: May 11, 1893.

Citation:

Personal gallantry and intrepidity displayed in the management of his brigade and in leading it in the assault in which he was wounded.

== See also ==
- List of Medal of Honor recipients
- List of American Civil War Medal of Honor recipients: G–L
- List of American Civil War generals (Union)
- Vermont in the Civil War
