= 1st Vermont Brigade =

American Civil War infantry brigade

First Vermont Brigade
- Flag of Vermont during the Civil War
- Active: October 1861–1865
- Allegiance: United States
- Branch: Union Army
- Type: Infantry
- Size: 2,850 soldiers (1864)
- Nickname: "Old Brigade"
- Engagements: American Civil War; Williamsburg; Savage's Station; Antietam; Fredericksburg; Chancellorsville; Second Fredericksburg; Salem Church; Gettysburg; the Wilderness; Spotsylvania Courthouse; Cold Harbor; Cedar Creek; Petersburg

Commanders
- Notable commanders: Brig. Gen. William T. H. Brooks; Brig. Gen. Lewis A. Grant

The First Vermont Brigade, or "Old Brigade" was an infantry brigade in the Union Army of the Potomac during the American Civil War. It suffered the highest casualty count of any brigade in the history of the United States Army, with some 1,172 killed in action.

== Organization and early battles ==
The "Old Brigade" served from 1861 to 1865 and was one of two brigades from Vermont, both famous in their own right.

The First Vermont Brigade was organized in October 1861, primarily through the efforts of Maj. Gen. William F. "Baldy" Smith. It was composed of the 2nd, 3rd, 4th, 5th and 6th Vermont regiments, which had been individually mustered into service between June and September. For a time, it also included the 26th New Jersey Infantry. Its first commander was Brig. Gen. William T. H. Brooks. In April 1862, the brigade was incorporated into the Army of the Potomac as the 2nd Brigade, 2nd Division, VI Corps, and first saw action during Maj. Gen. George B. McClellan's Peninsula Campaign in the battles of Williamsburg and Savage's Station. It later was present at Antietam and Fredericksburg. Under the command of Brig. Gen. Lewis A. Grant, the Vermonters fought in the campaign culminating in the Battle of Chancellorsville. The Vermonters participated in VI Corps' capture of Marye's Heights in the Second Battle of Fredericksburg and then were prominent in the fighting at Salem Church. They were held in reserve during the Battle of Gettysburg, holding a flank guard position behind Big Round Top, losing only one man wounded. After the Gettysburg campaign, elements of the Vermont Brigade were sent to help quell the draft riots in New York City.

== The Overland Campaign ==
The depleted brigade received reinforcements in May 1864 when the 11th Vermont Infantry was assigned to the organization. That same month, the Army of the Potomac, under the overall supervision of Lt. Gen. Ulysses S. Grant, began its spring offensive (the Overland Campaign) towards Richmond. The Vermont Brigade mustered approximately 2,850 soldiers at the start of the campaign.

On the morning of May 5, the Union army attacked Gen. Robert E. Lee's Army of Northern Virginia at the Battle of the Wilderness. While the initial Union attack was successful, rough terrain and stubborn resistance ground down the attack. By midday, Lt. Gen. A.P. Hill's Confederate corps had been brought up and was attacking the weak Union center along the Orange Plank Road. Maj. Gen. George W. Getty's brigades were ordered by Maj. Gen. Winfield S. Hancock, who was still bringing up most of his corps, to hold the road and counterattack. The Vermont Brigade took the southern flank and charged the advancing Confederates. Ordered to retreat, the 5th Vermont regiment instead launched a bayonet charge, buying time for Union troops and the rest of the Vermont Brigade to fall back to their hasty works. The Confederates continued to attack until the Union line was stabilized. Losses by the brigade totaled 1,269 killed, wounded, and missing in less than 12 hours of fighting.

After the Wilderness, the Union Army moved south to Spotsylvania Court House, where Lee's army had entrenched. The 11th Vermont Infantry joined the brigade at this point. Early in the battle, elements of the Vermont brigade, defending barricades forward of the rest of the Union Army, were ordered to retreat and spike their supporting artillery field pieces before the Confederates overran them. Disobeying orders, the commander of the brigade ordered the guns to be "spiked with canister," and the brigade was able to defend the guns and works successfully until reinforcements arrived to stabilize the position. The Vermonters suffered heavily during the ensuing assault on the Confederate defenses as The Vermont Brigade led the assault on the "Mule Shoe Salient", a protruding network of trenches in the center of the Confederate lines.

The final battle of the Overland Campaign was the Battle of Cold Harbor. The Vermont Brigade was one of the units selected to charge Confederate earthworks on June 1, 1864. Grant's attack failed and he suffered heavy losses. In less than 10 minutes, hundreds of soldiers from the Vermont Brigade were killed or wounded. The brigade, in less than one month of fighting, had been reduced from 2,850 men to less than 1,200.

== Petersburg and the Valley ==
While the Army of the Potomac and the Army of Northern Virginia dug in at Petersburg, Confederate Lt. Gen. Jubal A. Early was sent on a mission through the Shenandoah Valley to the outskirts of Washington, D.C. The Vermont Brigade fought in the Valley Campaign against Early, under the overall command of Maj. Gen. Philip Sheridan. At the Battle of Cedar Creek, Early launched a surprise attack against Sheridan's army and the First Vermont Brigade covered the Union army's temporary retreat, prior to Sheridan's counterattack and decisive victory. Lewis Grant commanded the 2nd Division, VI Corps, during the later stages of this action, when Getty became acting corps commander. Col. George P. Foster led the brigade while Grant was in command of the division. Foster's brigade held the center of the division's line until the entire formation retreated in good order. When Brig. Gen. Daniel D. Bidwell fell and his brigade, of the Vermonters' left, was in danger of losing heart, Lt. Col. Winsor B. French, who took command, is reported to have told his men not to fall back until the Vermonters did so. Six Medals of Honor were awarded to Vermonters at Cedar Creek, and the brigade captured three regimental colors and much of the 12th North Carolina regiment.

Returning to Petersburg, where it was engaged until the end of the war, the First Vermont Brigade led the attack on the earthworks defending the city, successfully breaking through the Confederate lines on the morning of April 2, 1865. Lewis Grant was wounded in this action and briefly relinquished command. Six members of the brigade were awarded the Medal of Honor for valor for this action. After the surrender of Lee's army later that month, the brigade participated in the victory parade in Washington. It returned to Vermont and the men were mustered out. Many former members of the brigade joined fraternal veterans organizations such as the Grand Army of the Republic and the Military Order of the Loyal Legion of the United States and held reunions to recount their days in the First Vermont Brigade.

== See also ==
- Vermont in the Civil War
