= Jackson Sargent =

American civil war soldier (1842–1921)

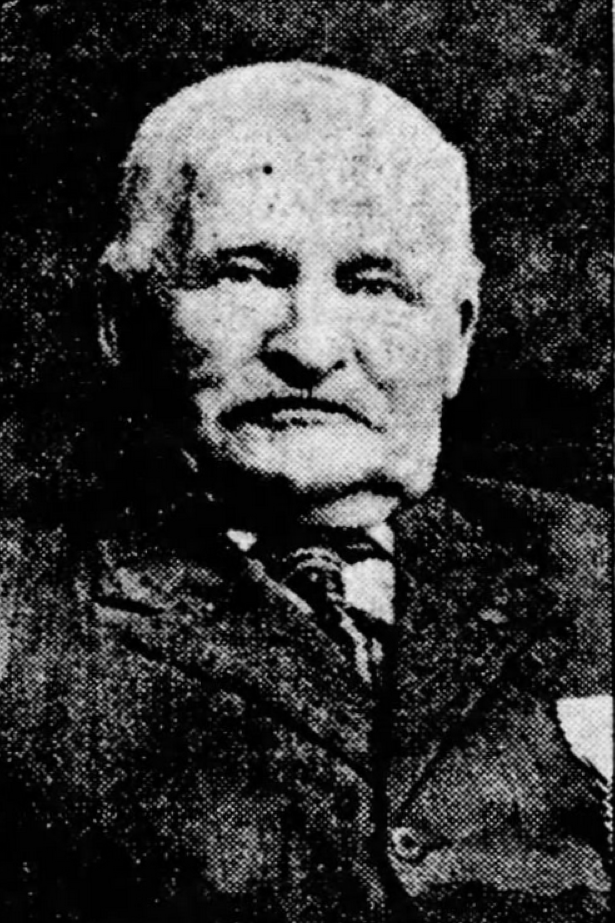
- Born: Jackson George Sargent; December 29, 1842; Stowe, Vermont, U.S.
- Died: October 2, 1921 (aged 78); Stowe, Vermont, U.S.
- Burial place: Riverbank Cemetery, Stowe, Vermont, U.S.
- Military career
- Allegiance: United States of America; Union
- Branch: United States Army; Union Army
- Rank: First lieutenant
- Units: Company K, 5th Vermont Infantry
- Awards: Medal of Honor

Jackson George Sargent (December 29, 1842 – October 2, 1921) was a United States color-sergeant who fought with the Union Army as a member of Company K of the 5th Vermont Infantry during the American Civil War. He received his nation's highest award for bravery during combat, the U.S. Medal of Honor, for planting the American flag on a Confederate fort at Petersburg, Virginia on April 2, 1865.

== Formative years ==
Born on December 29, 1842, in Stowe, Vermont, Jackson George Sargent was a son of Jeremiah Sargent (1814–1888) and Sophronia P. (Robinson) Sargent (1814-1886).

He was raised and educated in Stowe, where he resided with his parents and siblings: Henry H., Hannah, and Charles Taylor Sargent.

== Civil War service ==
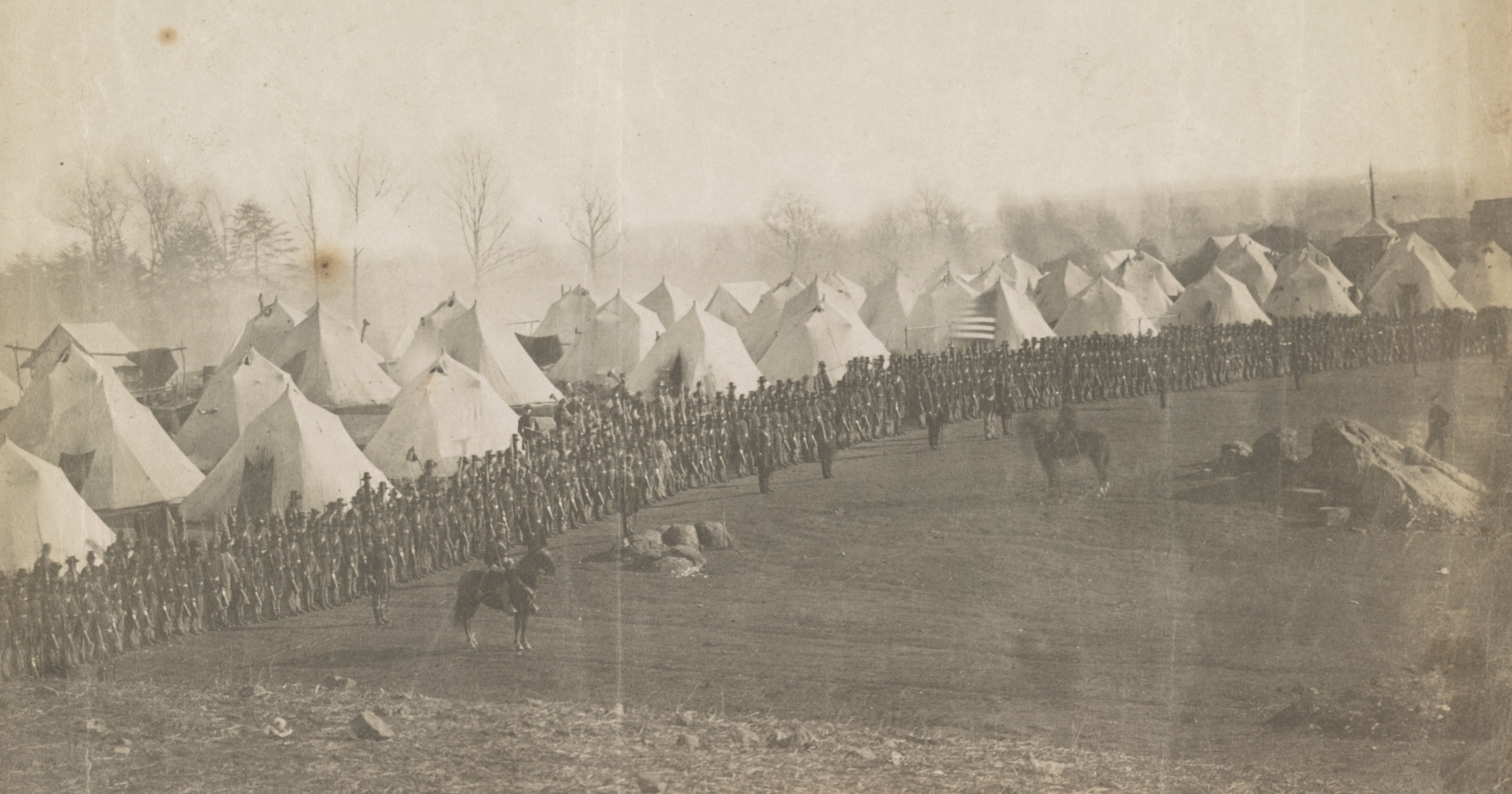
5th Vermont Infantry, Camp Griffin, Virginia, 1861

Sargent enlisted as a private in the 5th Vermont Infantry, Company D at Stowe, Vermont in August 1861, and was commissioned as the first lieutenant of Company K of that regiment in May 1865. Engagements during his tenure of service included: the defense of Washington, D.C., Siege of Yorktown (1862), Battle of Williamsburg, Battle of Garnett's and Golding's Farm, Battle of Savage's Station, Maryland Campaign, Battle of Crampton's Gap, Battle of Antietam, Battle of Fredericksburg, Battle of Salem Church, Battle of Gettysburg, Battle of the Wilderness, Battle of Spotsyvlania Court House, Battle of Cold Harbor, Battle of Cedar Creek, Third Battle of Petersburg, and the Battle of Appomattox Court House. He was awarded the U.S. Medal of Honor for his display of gallantry on April 2, 1865, during which he scaled, and placed the American flag on, the parapet of a Confederate fort at Petersburg, Virginia. That award was conferred in October 1891.

== Post-war life ==
Following his honorable discharge from the military, Sargent returned home to Vermont, where he wed fellow Vermont native Caroline M. (Harlow) Sargent (1842–1895) sometime around 1867. On July 2, 1868, he and "Carrie" welcomed the birth of their son, Fred (1868–1898). Two years later, federal census takers documented the trio as residents of Stowe. By 1880, Sargent was a farmer residing in Hyde Park, Lamoille County, Vermont with Carrie and their children, Fred, Howard, and Walter Merrill (the latter two of whom were born, respectively, circa 1871, and 1875). Also living with them were laborer Henry Peck and dressmaker Hattie Chatman. Still in Stowe as of 1890, the federal census taker that year confirmed his prior service with the 5th Vermont during the American Civil War.

After being widowed by his first wife in 1895, he was also preceded in death by his son, Fred, who died in 1898. Sargent then remarried sometime around the turn of the century, taking New York native Clara H. (Douglass) Sargent (1847–1919) as his bride. Still farming in 1910, he and his second wife, Clara, were empty nesters in Stowe that year. By the time of the federal census taker's arrival in 1920, Sargent was still dairy farming, but now a two-time widower living alone with his 67-year-old housekeeper, Martha Warner.

For many years, Sargent was also an active member of the Grand Army of the Republic (H.H. Smith Post).

Suffering from a shock-related illness, Sargent died at his Maple Street home in Stowe on October 2, 1921, and was laid to rest with military honors at the Riverbank Cemetery, where both of his wives were buried. Funeral services were held at his home prior to that interment. Twenty members of the American Legion's Donald McMahon Post served as the honor guard.

== Medal of Honor citation ==
First to scale the enemy's works and plant the colors thereon.

== See also ==
- List of Medal of Honor recipients
