= Daniel D. Bidwell =

Union Army general (1819–1864)

Daniel Davidson Bidwell
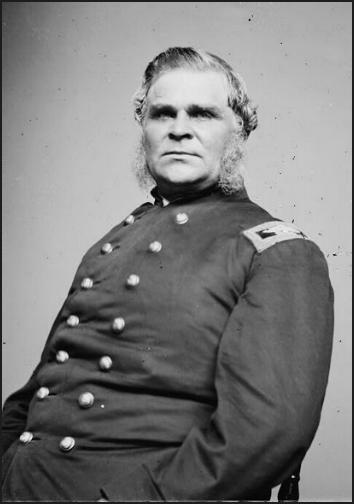
- Daniel Davidson Bidwell
- Born: August 12, 1819; Buffalo, New York, US
- Died: October 19, 1864 (aged 45); Cedar Creek, Virginia, US
- Burial place: Forest Lawn Cemetery, Buffalo, New York
- Military career
- Allegiance: United States; Union
- Branch: United States Army; Union Army
- Service years: 1861–1864
- Rank: Brigadier General
- Conflicts: American Civil War; Battle of Spotsylvania; Battle of Cold Harbor; Siege of Petersburg; Battle of Fort Stevens; Battle of Cedar Creek (DOW)

Daniel Davidson Bidwell (August 12, 1819 – October 19, 1864) was a civic leader in Buffalo, New York, before the outbreak of the American Civil War. He enlisted early in the war and then was appointed colonel of a regiment of infantry. He was promoted to general in command of a brigade in early 1864, leading it until he was mortally wounded at the Battle of Cedar Creek.

== Early life ==
Daniel Bidwell was born on August 12, 1819, in Buffalo, New York. He was raised in the city and educated in local schools. He was involved in, and became the leader of, "D" Company Buffalo City Guard (an independent militia), before the war.

== Civil War ==
After the outbreak of war, Daniel Bidwell joined the 65th New York State Militia as a private but was promoted to the rank of captain. He then was involved in organizing the 74th New York Militia. Bidwell next was appointed colonel of the 49th New York Volunteer Infantry on August 1, 1861.

As regimental commander, he served in the Peninsula Campaign in the Second Division, VI Corps, Army of the Potomac. Bidwell apparently was not present at the Battle of South Mountain or the Battle of Antietam. In 1863, when VI Corps, under Maj. Gen. John Sedgwick, crossed the Rappahannock River during the campaign culminating in the Battle of Chancellorsville, Bidwell's regiment served in the brigade of Brig. Gen. Thomas H. Neill in the Second Division, VI corps, now under Brig. Gen. Albion Howe. The 49th New York distinguished itself by fending off probing attacks launched by Confederate MG Jubal Early as Neill's brigade approached Fredericksburg, Virginia. Bidwell thereafter was involved in the Second Battle of Fredericksburg and the Battle of Salem Church. On the morning of May 4, 1863, Bidwell's regiment, with artillery support, fended off an attack by the 48th Virginia Infantry from the brigade of Brig. Gen. William "Extra Billy" Smith. The New Yorkers reported capturing 200 prisoners and the colors of that regiment. The 49th New York suffered only 35 casualties in these actions. Bidwell continued in regimental command at the Battle of Gettysburg, where he served under General Neill on the far right flank of the Army.

When the Army of the Potomac was reorganized for Lt. Gen. Ulysses S. Grant’s Overland Campaign, Bidwell retained his command under General Neill, but they had a new division commander, Brig. Gen. George Getty. When Getty was wounded in the Battle of the Wilderness on May 5, 1864, Neill became acting division commander. Bidwell took over command of Neill's brigade. The brigade had been detached from second division and sent to serve under Brig. Gen. Horatio Wright on the right flank of the Army. On May 6, Bidwell took part in an unsuccessful assault on the Confederate lines. Later in the day, when Confederate Brig. Gen. John B. Gordon attacked the exposed right flank of VI Corps, Bidwell's command was the third brigade from the right, with the commands of Brig. Gen. Truman Seymour and Brig. Gen. Alexander Shaler beyond it. Gordon's attack routed the brigades of Shaler and Seymour. Bidwell turned his brigade to face the Confederate advance and a portion of Seymour's brigade rallied on his line. This stand stopped Gordon's advance.

Bidwell led his brigade at the Battle of Spotsylvania, the Battle of Cold Harbor, and the earliest stage of the Siege of Petersburg. Colonel Bidwell was promoted to the rank of brigadier general on August 11, 1864.

=== Service in the Shenandoah Valley ===
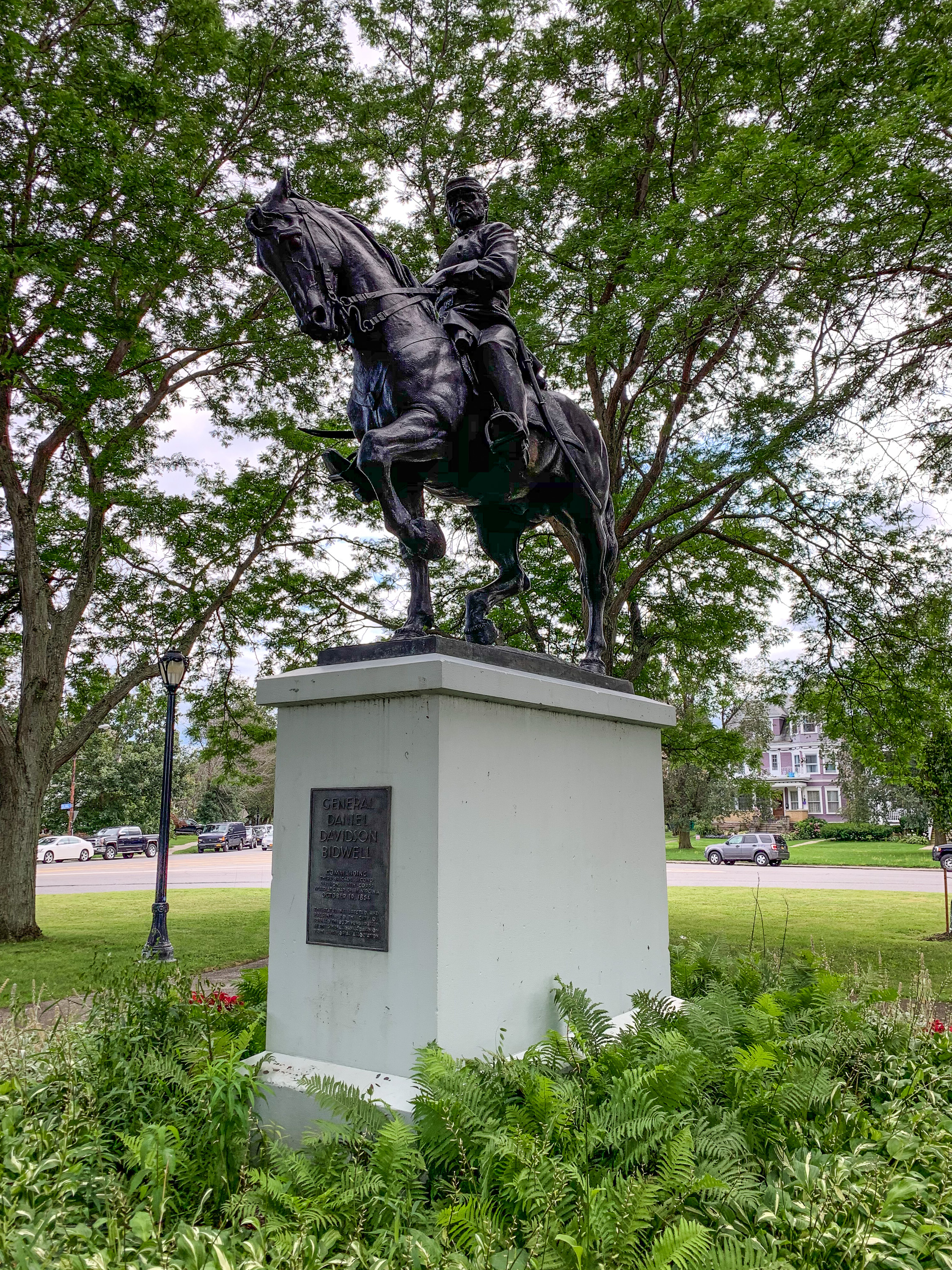
Statue at Colonial Circle by Sahl Swarz (1952)

Bidwell was present at the earliest stages of the Siege of Petersburg. Thereafter, he served in Washington, D.C., and the Shenandoah Valley. When Jubal Early moved on the capital following his ousting Maj. Gen. David Hunter from the Valley, he crossed into Maryland. After winning the Battle of Monocacy, Early moved on Washington. He had been delayed just long enough for units of VI Corps to reach the capital. Bidwell's brigade arrived just as the Confederates were advancing on Fort Stevens, one of the key forts on the perimeter of Washington. At a crucial stage of the Battle of Fort Stevens Bidwell's brigade moved out and pushed back Early's troops. Bidwell's command lost about one quarter of its numbers, about 250 of 1,000, in this action.

Bidwell next was in the field under the command of Maj. Gen. Philip H. Sheridan. Maj. Gen. Horatio Wright commanded VI Corps in the new Army of the Shenandoah, and Getty had resumed command of second division. Bidwell led his brigade at the Battle of Opequon, otherwise known as the Third Battle of Winchester, and the Battle of Fisher's Hill. At the Battle of Cedar Creek on October 19, 1864, much of the Army of the Shenandoah was ousted from its encampments by a surprise Confederate attack. VI corps was the last infantry command left contesting the enemy advance by 7:00 AM. When first and third divisions were forced to retreat, Getty's second division became the rear guard of the Union infantry force. Bidwell's brigade held the left flank of Getty's division with the 1st Vermont Brigade in the center and Col J. M. Warner's brigade on the right. This line held despite continued Confederate attacks and then artillery fire. General Bidwell was mortally wounded by a Confederate shell while commanding his brigade. Getty eventually had to withdraw to the line from which Sheridan, who had ridden in from Winchester, Virginia launched his successful counterattack. Lt. Col. Winsor B. French of the 77th New York Infantry commanded Bidwell's brigade after he was struck down.

General Bidwell was buried at the Forest Lawn Cemetery in Buffalo. A statue in his honor is located at Colonial Circle in Buffalo. His funeral march for piano was written by Karl August Goehle, a well known and respected musician and teacher in Buffalo. Library of Congress, "General Bidwells funeral march", LC Control No.: 52049003.

== See also ==
- List of American Civil War generals (Union)
