= Lester G. Hack =

American Civil War recipient of the Medal of Honor

Lester Goodel Hack
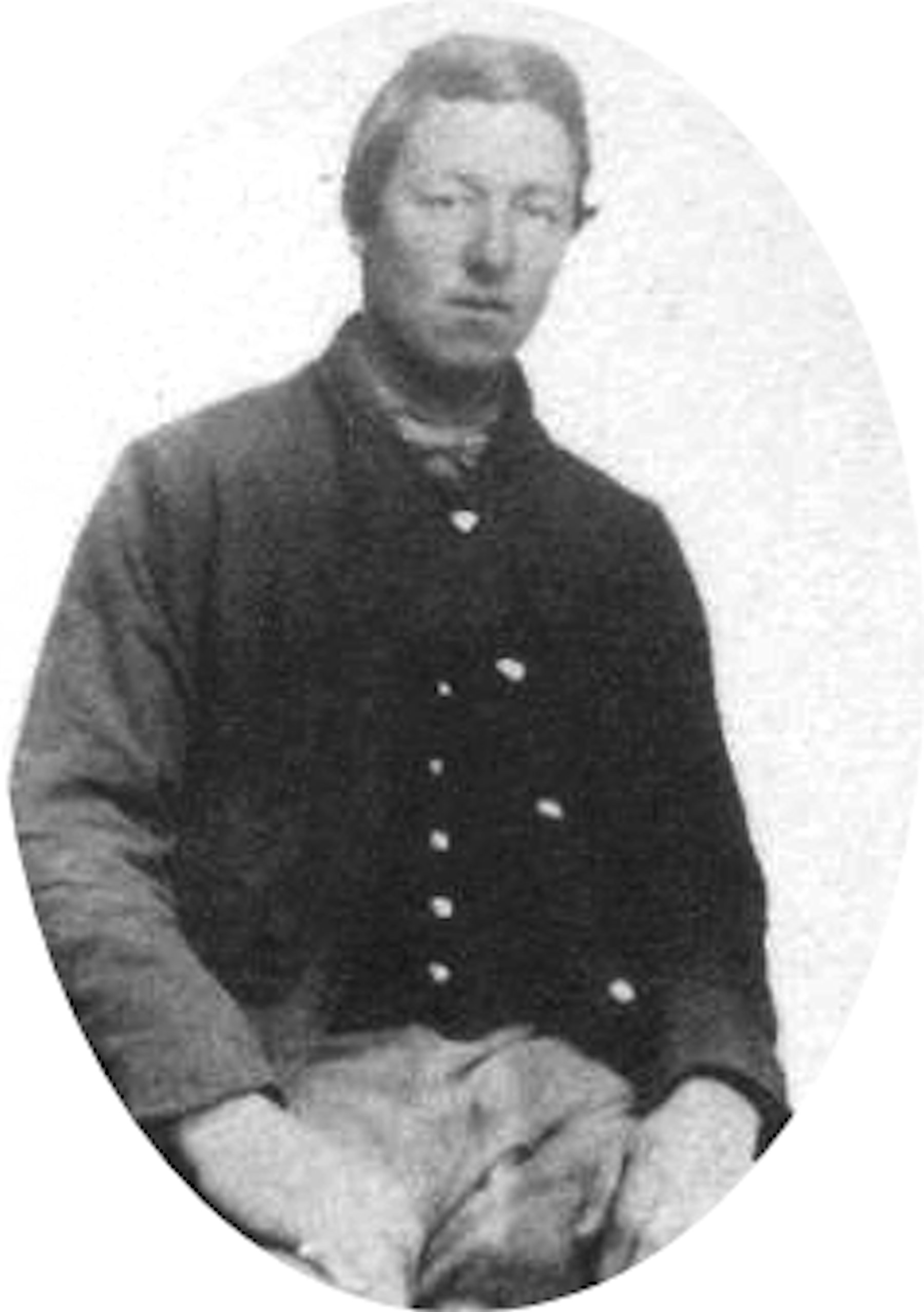
- Hack in 1965
- Born: January 18, 1844; Bolton, New York, US
- Died: April 24, 1928 (aged 84)
- Burial place: Ticonderoga, New York, US
- Military career
- Allegiance: United States
- Branch: United States Army
- Service years: 1861–1865
- Rank: Sergeant
- Units: Company F, 5th Vermont Infantry
- Conflicts: Third Battle of Petersburg; American Civil War
- Awards: Medal of Honor

Lester Goodel Hack (January 18, 1844 – April 24, 1928) was an American soldier who fought in the American Civil War. Hack received his country's highest award for bravery during combat, the Medal of Honor. Hack's medal was won for his actions at the Third Battle of Petersburg in Virginia, where he captured the flag of the Confederate 23rd Tennessee Infantry on April 2, 1865. He was honored with the award on May 10, 1865.

== Biography ==
Hack was born in Bolton, New York. He joined the Army from Salisbury, Vermont on August 27, 1861 and mustered into federal service on September 16 as a private in Company F. On December 15, 1863, he reenlisted and was promoted to Corporal. He was wounded on May 5, 1864 at the Battle of the Wilderness. He returned to his company and on March 1, 1865, during the Siege of Petersburg, he was promoted to Sergeant.

After the war, Hack mustered out in Vermont in June 1865 and returned to his native New York. At some time he married Emma J. Burt (1849–1911). He died at age 84 on April 24, 1928.

== Medal of Honor citation ==
The President of the United States of America, in the name of Congress, takes pleasure in presenting the Medal of Honor to Sergeant Lester Goodel Hack, United States Army, for extraordinary heroism on 2 April 1865, while serving with Company F, 5th Vermont Infantry, in action at Petersburg, Virginia, for capture of flag of 23d Tennessee Infantry (Confederate States of America) with several of the enemy.

== See also ==
- List of American Civil War Medal of Honor recipients: G–L
