= Savage's Station, Virginia =

Coordinates: 37°30′27.9″N 77°15′56.2″W

Savage's Station was the wartime name of a supply depot, ammunition dump, field hospital, and command headquarters of the Army of the Potomac during the Peninsula Campaign of the American Civil War. It was a strategic center for the Army and also the site of the 1862 Battle of Savage's Station.

== From farmhouse to headquarters ==
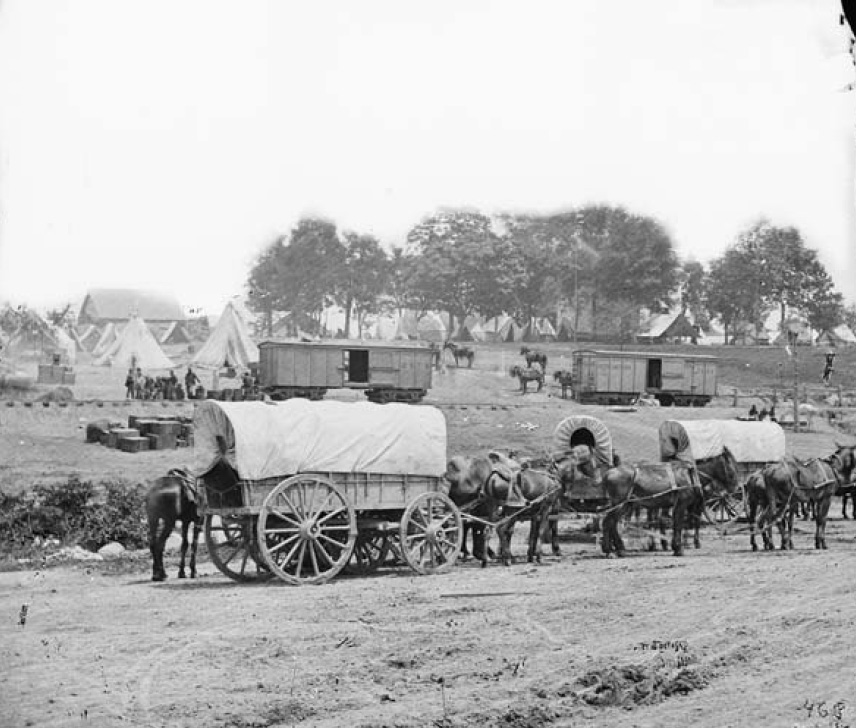
McClellan’s headquarters at Savage’s Station, 1862.

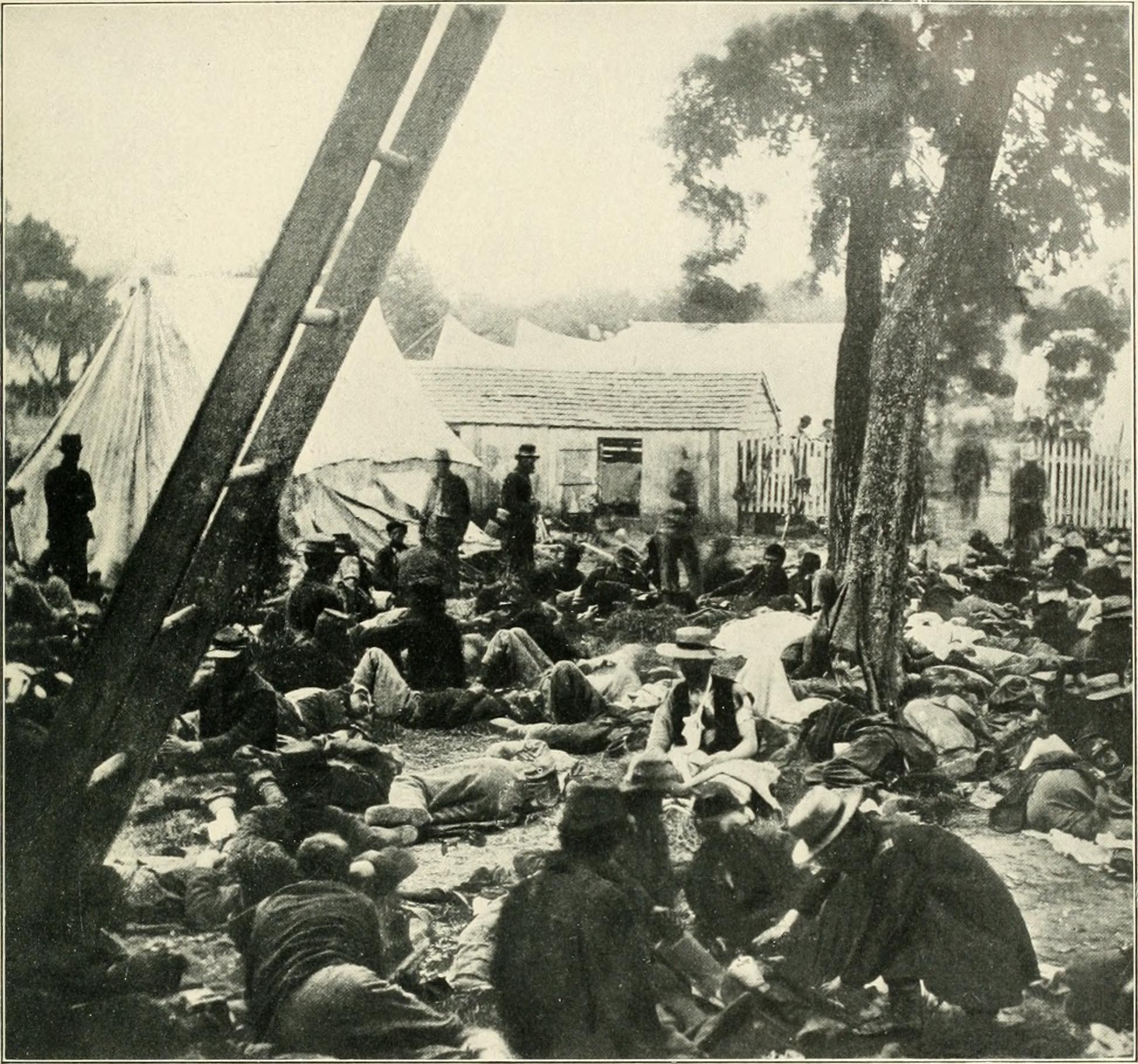
Federal soldiers, sick and wounded, who became prisoners of war after Confederates occupied the station

Savage's Station was located in Henrico County, Virginia on what was the Richmond and York River Railroad, however the historical department of the Norfolk Southern Railroad, the railroad track's current owner, has no record that an actual train station or station house ever existed on the property. A farmhouse is known to have been located in a copse of trees on a small knoll next to the railroad track and is visible in several period drawings and photographs made during the war.

The farm house served as the nucleus of a large field hospital during and after the battle of Seven Pines and the Seven Days Battles. The house also functioned as General George B. McClellan's headquarters during the battle of Savage's Station on June 29, 1862.

== Post war history ==
The Savage's Station house survived the battle in 1862, but was burned by Federal cavalry under General Philip H. Sheridan in 1864. The house appears to have never been rebuilt, and no trace of it remains today. However, a smokehouse from the 19th century still existed on the property as late as the 1930s when it was photographed during a survey of local historical structures as a project of the Civilian Conservation Corps. The smokehouse fell into ruin and collapsed sometime prior to the 1980s. A small brick-walled cemetery from the 18th century still sits near the former location of the house not far from the railroad track.

=== Modern battlefield area ===
Today the battlefield of Savage's Station is considered "lost" by preservationists, the area of heaviest infantry fighting being covered by the nearby cloverleaf interchange of interstate highways I-295 and I-64. However the land that comprised Savage's Station itself, such as the Union field hospital, supply depot, ammunition dump and rear areas of the Federal battle line, remains in a remarkably pristine condition, the nearby interchange barely noticeable during seasons when the foliage is in full bloom.

In the late 1980s, a last-ditch effort by local residents attempted to preserve the rolling farmland from being rezoned for commercial uses, but their desires were overruled by the Henrico Country Board of Commissioners. A developer had proposed to build a large truckstop and cargo transfer station on the property, but the close proximity of the interchange would have made reasonable and safe ingress and egress to the property difficult. Such a use would have also clashed with the bucolic residential neighborhoods in the surrounding area. As such, to this day the land remains undeveloped, and is now under lease for agricultural purposes, however the property is currently owned by a prominent Richmond area real estate holding company and is listed for sale. The land is now a solar farm.

=== Recent history ===
In 2024, the Richmond Battlefields Association sought to acquire the land to prevent it being developed into a technology park. Other proposals put the site at risk of development by data center development. Despite objections from environmentalists and historians, plans to build a data center on the site have been approved, putting the site at risk.
