= Battle of Garnett's & Golding's Farms =

Battle of the American Civil War

- Part of the American Civil War
Date	June 27, 1862 – June 28, 1862
Location	Henrico County, Virginia 37.5532°N 77.3145°W
Result	Inconclusive

Belligerents
United States (Union)	(Confederate States of America) CSA (Confederacy)

Commanders and leaders
William F. Smith; Winfield S. Hancock	John B. Magruder; Robert A. Toombs; George T. Anderson

Units involved
1 Brigade ( Army of the Potomac)	1 Division ( Army of Northern Virginia)

Strength
1 Brigade	1 Division

Casualties and losses
189	438

The Battle of Garnett's and Golding's Farms took place June 27–28, 1862, in Henrico County, Virginia, as part of the Seven Days Battles of the American Civil War's Peninsula Campaign. While the battle at Gaines's Mill raged north of the Chickahominy River, the forces of Confederate general John B. Magruder conducted a reconnaissance in force that developed into a minor attack against the Union line south of the river at Garnett's Farm. The Confederates attacked again near Golding's Farm on the morning of June 28 but in both cases were easily repulsed. The action at the Garnett and Golding farms accomplished little beyond convincing McClellan that he was being attacked from both sides of the Chickahominy.

== Background ==
=== Military situation ===
Richmond, Virginia, as the center of the Southern rebellion, was a city of obvious strategic importance to both sides of the American Civil War. In this context, General George McClellan and his Army of the Potomac began a campaign on the Virginia Peninsula to take the city. His early attempts were successful. In fact, on nearly every front, the Northerners had an advantage over the Confederates. By the end of May 1862 however, McClellan's army was split in half along the banks of the Chickahominy River, with one wing, encompassing two Union corps, to the south river, and the other wing, with some three Federal corps, to the north. On May 31, Joseph E. Johnston, the general-in-chief of the Confederate Army of Northern Virginia, sought to capitalize on the bifurcation and led three columns of soldiers towards the Union position at the south of the river. The resulting conflict, called the Battle of Seven Pines (or Fair Oaks), was inconclusive. Johnston's plan fell apart, and the Army of the Potomac lost no ground. Johnston himself was wounded however, and the next day, June 1, Jefferson Davis, the President of the Confederate States, appointed his military adviser, General Robert E. Lee, to lead the Confederate armies. There was a lull in the fighting on the Peninsula in subsequent weeks, ending in a Union offensive at Oak Grove on June 25. Lee's men managed to halt the attacking Federals, and the next day, the Confederates went on the offensive in the Battle of Mechanicsville (or Beaver Dam Creek). The battle ended in a Confederate repulse and heavy Southern casualties. Nevertheless, the victorious Federals, under General McClellan's orders, retreated to Boatswain's Swamp at the south Chickahominy and established a formidable battle line. There, on June 27, the Confederate armies launched an attack at Gaines's Mill, which would become one of the bloodiest battles of the Peninsula Campaign. While the conflict at Gaines's Mill raged, another conflict was brewing near two farms to the south, which would turn into the Battle of Garnett's and Golding's Farms.

== Battle ==
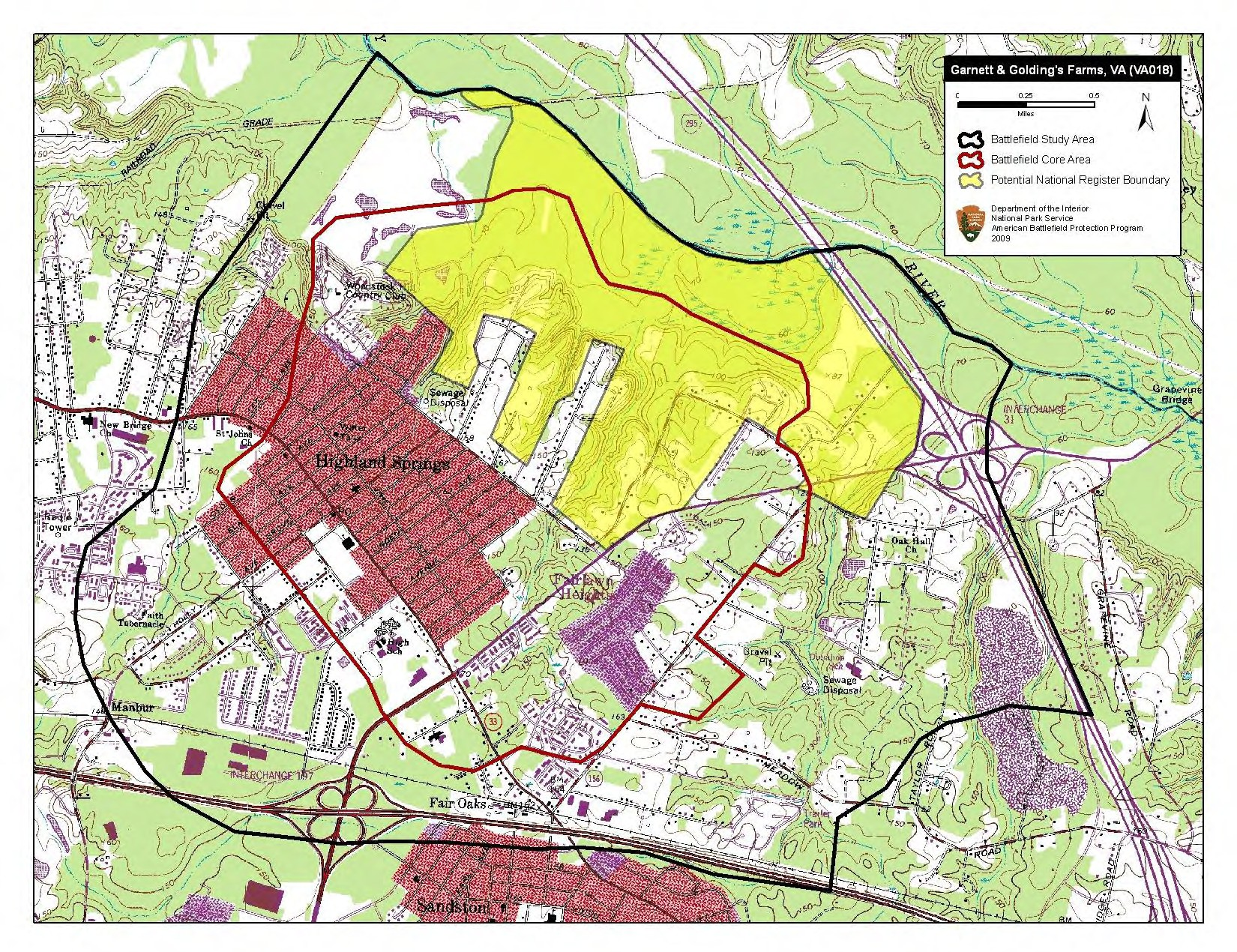
Map of Garnett's & Golding's Farms Battlefield core and study areas by the American Battlefield Protection Program.

James M. Garnett's farm, near Old Tavern, was situated on the edge of the bluffs at the banks of the Chickahominy River. Near the Garnett farm was Golding's Plain, belonging to Simon Gouldin. Between the two farms was a precipitous ravine, a creek and a hill named Garnett's Hill. Union soldiers from Brigadier General William T. H. Brooks's brigade of William F. "Baldy" Smith's 2nd division of the VI Corps began placing artillery pieces on Garnett's Hill the night before the battle. This activity was resumed by Brigadier General Winfield Scott Hancock's brigade of the same Corps the following morning–June 27, 1862. Six batteries of reserve artillery were placed.

While the Federals worked, Confederate soldiers of Major General David R. Jones's division began taking up positions in the area. Brigadier General Robert Toombs's brigade positioned themselves at the west side of the ravine, while Colonel George T. Anderson's brigade took up a position northwest of the area, less than a mile from the Garnett house. Anderson's and Toombs's artillerists were ordered to fire on the Union soldiers whenever the opportunity presented itself. The Federals, now preparing for a general engagement, were told to avoid a clash with the Confederates. The result was a brisk shelling that lasted about an hour, and ended in a Confederate withdrawal. The Union's twenty-three, well-positioned guns withstood the Confederates's ten guns, which were situated in an open field. Later, some of Major General Lafayette McLaws's men advanced towards the Union line at the Garnett farm at about 4 pm, but withdrew after ten minutes under heavy fire. There was a lull in the subsequent hours, ending with Toombs's attack on the Union line at about 7 pm. Toombs was ordered to reconnoiter or "feel the enemy". Instead, he engaged the Federals in a "sharp and sustained fight". After nightfall, Toombs's advance was repelled by Winfield Hancock's brigade after about an hour and a half of fighting. The Confederates suffered some 271 casualties during the day's conflict. The action at the Garnett farm accomplished little.

The following day, June 28, Union and Confederate soldiers clashed again near the Golding house. Jones suspected that the Federals near the house were withdrawing, and authorized Toombs to perform a reconnaissance-in-force to ascertain whether this was true. However, Toombs turned the reconnaissance operation into a full engagement and advanced with some of Anderson's men. Before he could be countermanded, the Confederates had already been repulsed by the VI Corps.

== Aftermath ==
In the two days of fighting at the Garnett and Golding farms, the Confederates suffered 438 casualties, while the Federals suffered 189. Anderson's men, who bore the brunt of the Federal counterattack, suffered 156 casualties on the second day of fighting. This battle accomplished little, but helped to convince McClellan that he was being attacked from both sides of the Chickahominy. On the evening of June 28, McClellan convened a meeting with his generals. He announced that he was willing to pursue an attack on Richmond, but such an attack could spell the defeat and destruction of the Army of the Potomac. The result of the meeting was that the Federals would begin a retreat. "The commanding general announced to us his purpose to begin a movement to the James River on the next day," noted Union general William B. Franklin. McClellan's decision to withdraw to the James set the stage for the subsequent Battle of Savage's Station.

== See also ==
- Troop engagements of the American Civil War, 1862
- List of costliest American Civil War land battles
- Richmond in the Civil War
- Virginia in the American Civil War
- List of American Civil War battles
- List of Virginia Civil War units
