= VI Corps (Union army) =

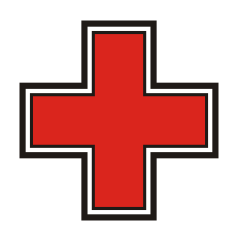
- VI Corps badge
- Active: 1862–1865
- Country: United States of America
- Branch: Union Army
- Type: Army Corps
- Size: Corps
- Part of: Army of the Potomac
- Engagements: American Civil War

Commanders
- Notable commanders: John Sedgwick

Insignia
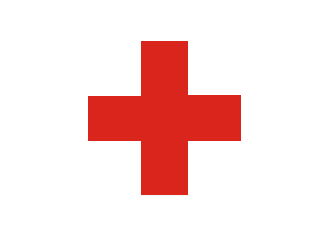
- 1st Division

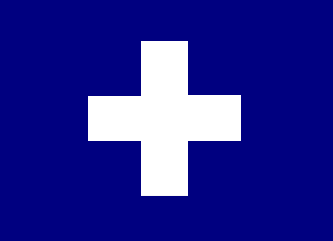
- 2nd Division

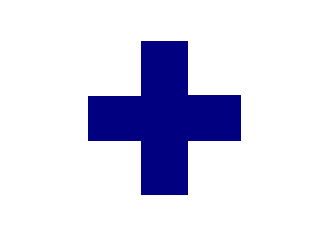
- 3rd Division

The VI Corps (Sixth Army Corps) was a corps of the Union army during the American Civil War.

== Formation ==
The corps was organized as the Sixth Provisional Corps on May 18, 1862, by uniting Maj. Gen. William B. Franklin's Division, which had just arrived on the Virginia Peninsula, with Maj. Gen. William F. Smith's Division, which was taken away from the IV Corps for this purpose. This provisional arrangement having been sanctioned by the U.S. War Department, the command received its permanent designation as the VI Army Corps, Army of the Potomac. Franklin was appointed corps commander, and Henry W. Slocum succeeded to the command of Franklin's Division. On June 20, 1862, the corps numbered 24,911, present and absent, with 19,405 present for duty, equipped; the corps artillery numbered 40 guns.

== 1862 ==
At the Battle of Gaines' Mill in the Seven Days Battles, Slocum's Division was sent to the support of Maj. Gen. Fitz John Porter and became hotly engaged, losing 2,021 men out of less than 8,000 present. The Vermont brigade of Smith's (2nd) Division took a prominent part in the fight at Savage's Station, the 5th Vermont losing 209 men in that action. The corps fought at other points during the Seven Days Battles, but at Malvern Hill it was held in reserve. After the Peninsula Campaign, the VI Corps was recalled to Washington DC and did not participate in the Second Bull Run Campaign aside from the First New Jersey Brigade of Slocum's (1st) Division having a sharp fight on August 27, at Bull Run Bridge, in which it lost 339 in killed, wounded, and missing, Brig. Gen. George W. Taylor, the brigade commander, receiving a mortal wound.

In the Maryland Campaign, Slocum's Division made a successful charge up the side of South Mountain at Crampton's Gap, driving the enemy from a strong position; Slocum's loss was 533 (113 killed, 418 wounded, 2 missing). At Antietam, the corps was held in reserve aside from Col. William Erwin's brigade, which participated in the storming of Bloody Lane. Winfield Hancock, who commanded the 1st Brigade of William F. Smith's division, was appointed to command the 1st Division of the II Corps after its commander Maj. Gen Israel B. Richardson fell mortally wounded, as the ranking brigadier in the division, Brig. Gen John C. Caldwell, was considered too junior for division command.

Important changes in the corps now took place. It received a valuable accession by the transfer of Maj. Gen. Darius N. Couch's Division of the IV Corps, which now became the 3rd Division of the VI Corps, with Maj. Gen. John Newton in command. General Franklin was promoted to the command of the Left Grand Division, VI and I Corps, and General Smith succeeded to the command of the corps. General Slocum was promoted to the command of the XII Corps, and Maj. Gen. William T. H. Brooks succeeded Slocum in command of the 1st Division, while Brig. Gen. Albion P. Howe succeeded to the command of Smith's (2nd) Division.

== 1863 ==
At Fredericksburg, December 13, 1862, only a few regiments of the corps were engaged, although all were under severe artillery fire. But the corps was engaged on the same field, May 3, 1863, in an action that made it famous with a brilliant display of dash and daring.

Up to this point, the entire corps had never fought a major engagement as a whole, only pieces of it participating in the battles on the Peninsula and Antietam. Their chance finally came when Maj. Gen. Joseph Hooker took the Army of the Potomac to Chancellorsville he left the VI Corps in front of Fredericksburg, which was still held by a strong force of the enemy. Maj. Gen. John Sedgwick, who had succeeded to the corps command, ordered an assault on Marye's Heights, and that strong position that had defied the assaults of the previous battle, was now carried by the VI Corps at the point of the bayonet. The divisions of Newton and Howe were the ones engaged together with Col Hiram Burnham's Light Division. Brooks's (1st) Division was engaged later in the day, at Salem Church. The corps lost in this battle 4,589 (485 killed, 2,619 wounded, 1,485 missing). The missing ones were, for the most part, lost in the action at Salem Church. On the day before this battle, the corps returns showed a strength of 23,730, "present for duty", of whom less than 20,000 were present in action. The Light Division was broken up after the battle, its regiments being assigned to other divisions.

In the Gettysburg campaign, the divisions were commanded by Generals Horatio G. Wright, Howe, and Newton. After setting up camp in Manchester, Maryland on July 1, 1863, they marched upwards of 37 miles in about 17 hours to reach Gettysburg on the afternoon of July 2, 1863. The 1st Division deployed and saw action at Little Round Top and the Wheatfield. Despite being the largest corps in the Union army at the time (16,000 men), the VI Corps was mostly held in reserve to the east of Gettysburg. It was not kept together as a unit during the second and third days of the battle, its brigades scattered around to plug holes in the line.

On July 2, Brig. Gen. Alexander Shaler's Brigade was sent into action as a support to the XII Corps on the right flank; several casualties also occurred in Brig. Gens. Henry L. Eustis's and Frank Wheaton's Brigades, of Newton's Division on the left. Wheaton's brigade helped stabilize that flank late in the day. (Newton left the corps, being assigned to command the I Corps, following the death of John F. Reynolds on the first day of the battle. Wheaton commanded the 3rd Division for the rest of the battle.)

During the pursuit of Robert E. Lee's army after Gettysburg, the Vermont Brigade was engaged at Funkstown, Maryland, where this one brigade, drawn out in a skirmish line of over a mile in length, alone and unassisted, repelled a determined attack of a vastly superior force, which in massed columns charged this skirmish line repeatedly. The Vermonters sustained but slight loss, as they occupied a strong, natural position.

Having returned to Virginia, the corps participated in the Bristoe Campaign. On November 7, 1863, at Rappahannock Station, it launched a successful assault on the enemy's entrenchments. The 6th Maine and 5th Wisconsin distinguished themselves particularly in this action, leading the storming party and carrying the works with the bayonet only. It was a success that resulted not only in a victory, but in the capture of a large number of prisoners, small arms, artillery and battle flags from the division of Major General Jubal Early.

In the Mine Run Campaign the divisions were commanded by Generals Wright, Howe, and Henry D. Terry, but were not in action to any extent. The corps went into winter quarters at Brandy Station.

== 1864 ==
Upon the reorganization of the army in March 1864, several changes were made. The 3rd Division was broken up, Shaler's Brigade being transferred to Horatio G. Wright's (1st) Division, while the brigades of Henry L. Eustis and Wheaton were placed in the 2nd Division, the command of which was given to General George W. Getty, who had served as a division commander in the IX Corps, and, also, in the VII Corps at the Siege of Suffolk.

The place of the 3rd Division was filled by the 3rd Division of the III Corps, that corps having been discontinued; the command of this division was given to Maj. Gen. James B. Ricketts.

The corps now contained 49 regiments of infantry, an artillery brigade composed of 8 batteries of light artillery (48 guns), and a battalion of heavy artillery acting as infantry; numbering in all, 24,163, "present for duty, equipped".

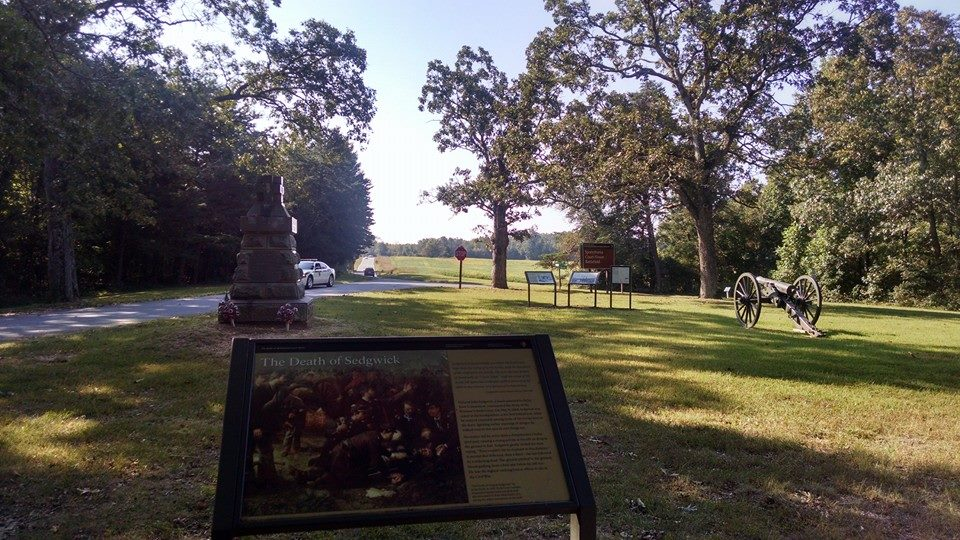
Monument to commemorate the death of General John Sedgwick, Commander of the VI Corps, at Spotsylvania National Military Park, Virginia, USA.

In the battles of the Wilderness and Spotsylvania of the Overland Campaign, the VI Corps encountered the hardest contested fighting of its experience. At the Wilderness, the Vermont Brigade—Getty's Division—lost 1,232 men out of the 2,800 effectives that crossed the Rapidan River on the previous day. At Spotsylvania, the Jersey Brigade of Wright's Division was engaged in a deadly struggle, the percentage of killed in the 15th New Jersey being equaled in only one instance during the whole war. General Sedgwick was killed by a sniper's bullet at Spotsylvania on May 9, which caused great distress to the soldiers of the corps, who loved and admired their "Uncle John". General Wright succeeded to the command of the corps, Brig. Gen. David A. Russell succeeding Wright in the command of the 1st Division. On May 10, Col. Emory Upton led a storming party of twelve picked regiments selected from the VI Corps; they carried the Confederate works in the "Mule Shoe" after a hand-to-hand fight in which bayonet wounds were freely given and received. On May 12, the entire corps fought at the "Bloody Angle", where the fighting was among the closest and deadliest of any recorded in the Civil War. The casualties of the corps at the Wilderness were 5,035 (719 killed, 3,660 wounded, 656 missing); and at Spotsylvania, 4,042 (688 killed, 2,820 wounded, 534 missing).

In the assault at Cold Harbor, June 1, 1864, the corps sustained another severe loss, 2,715 of its number killed or wounded. Accompanying the army to Petersburg, it participated in the preliminary operations incidental to the investment of that stronghold. But its stay was of short duration. Lt. Gen. Jubal A. Early's invasion of Maryland necessitated a transfer of troops to confront him, and the VI Corps selected for that duty in the Valley Campaigns of 1864. On July 6, Ricketts's (3rd) Division embarked at City Point, and, landing at Baltimore on July 8, marched out to meet Early. This division took part in the Battle of Monocacy on the following day, and, although unable to defeat Early, checked his advance on Washington, D.C., giving the defenses their time to organize. The other two divisions embarked on July 10 and, landing at Washington, attacked Early, whose advance had reached Fort Stevens, within the city limits. The brunt of this fight fell to the lot of Brig. Gen. Daniel D. Bidwell's (3rd) Brigade, of Getty's (2nd) Division, every regimental commandant in this brigade, but one, being either killed or wounded.

The corps followed in pursuit of Early through Maryland, into Virginia, then continued up the Shenandoah Valley. Maj. Gen. Philip Sheridan was placed in command of the Army of the Shenandoah, which was composed of the VI, VIII, and XIX Corps, and its campaign in the Valley was a memorable one by reason of the victories at Third Winchester, Fisher's Hill, and Cedar Creek. In the latter battle occurred the famous incident of Sheridan's Ride from Winchester, followed by a defeat from which Early never recovered. Getty's division distinguished itself at Cedar Creek, holding off enemy attacks long after other units had retreated. General Russell was killed at Third Winchester, and General Bidwell at Cedar Creek. The casualties of the corps at the Opequon aggregated 1,699 (211 killed, 1,442 wounded, 46 missing). At Cedar Creek, it lost 2,126 (298 killed, 1,628 wounded, 200 missing). Its total loss in the Shenandoah campaign, August 22 to October 20, was 4,899, out of 12,615 "present for duty", in August. General Wheaton succeeded to the command of Russell, while Brig. Gen. Truman Seymour was assigned to the command of the 3rd Division, in place of General Ricketts, who was seriously wounded at Cedar Creek.

== 1865 ==
In December 1864, the VI Corps returned to the Army of the Potomac in the Petersburg trenches, built their winter quarters, and went into position near the Weldon Railroad. On the April 2, 1865, the corps was assigned a prominent and important part in the final assault on the fortifications of Petersburg. Then came the hot pursuit of Lee's retreating veterans in the Appomattox Campaign, during which the corps fought at Sayler's Creek. This, the last battle for the VI Corps, was marked by the same features that had so largely characterized all its battles: dash, hard fighting (some of it with the bayonet), victory, and large captures of men, flags, guns, and material. A Confederate attack on the corps as it crossed the creek was repulsed with support from the artillery, and the counterattack broke Lt. Gen. Richard S. Ewell's line. Ewell and George Washington Custis Lee, oldest son of Robert E. Lee, were among the prisoners taken by federal forces. Major General George Washington Custis Lee was forcibly captured on the battlefield by Private David Dunnels White of the 37th Massachusetts Regiment.

The VI Corps was disbanded on June 28, 1865.

== Command history ==
William B. Franklin	May 18, 1862 – November 16, 1862
William F. Smith	November 16, 1862 – January 25, 1863
John Newton	January 25, 1863 – February 5, 1863
John Sedgwick	February 5, 1863 – April 6, 1864
James B. Ricketts	April 6, 1864 – April 13, 1864
John Sedgwick	April 13, 1864 – May 9, 1864
Horatio G. Wright	May 9, 1864 – July 8, 1864
* Horatio G. Wright	August 6, 1864 – October 16, 1864
* James B. Ricketts	October 16, 1864 – October 19, 1864
* George W. Getty	October 19, 1864 – October 19, 1864
* Horatio G. Wright	October 19, 1864 – December 6, 1864
Horatio G. Wright	December 6, 1864 – January 16, 1865
George W. Getty	January 16, 1865 – February 11, 1865
Horatio G. Wright	February 11, 1865 – June 28, 1865

* Corps assigned to the Army of the Shenandoah; other entries to the Army of the Potomac

== Battles ==
Battle of West Point; Battle of Gaines' Mill; Golding's Farm; Garnett's Farm; Savage Station; White Oak Swamp; Malvern Hill; Manassas/Bull Run; Crampton's Gap; Battle of Antietam; Battle of Fredericksburg; Marye's Heights; Salem Church; Banks' Ford; Battle of Gettysburg; Funkstown; Rappahannock Station	Battle of Mine Run; Battle of the Wilderness; Battle of Spotsylvania Court House; Battle of Cold Harbor; Second Battle of Petersburg; Battle of Monocacy; Battle of Fort Stevens; Island Ford; Strasburg; Third Battle of Winchester; Charlestown; Opequon; Fisher's Hill; Battle of Cedar Creek; Fall Of Petersburg; Sailor's Creek; Battle of Appomattox Station
