= Battle of Salem Church =

Battle of the American Civil War

Coordinates: 38°17′20″N 77°31′51″W

- Part of the American Civil War
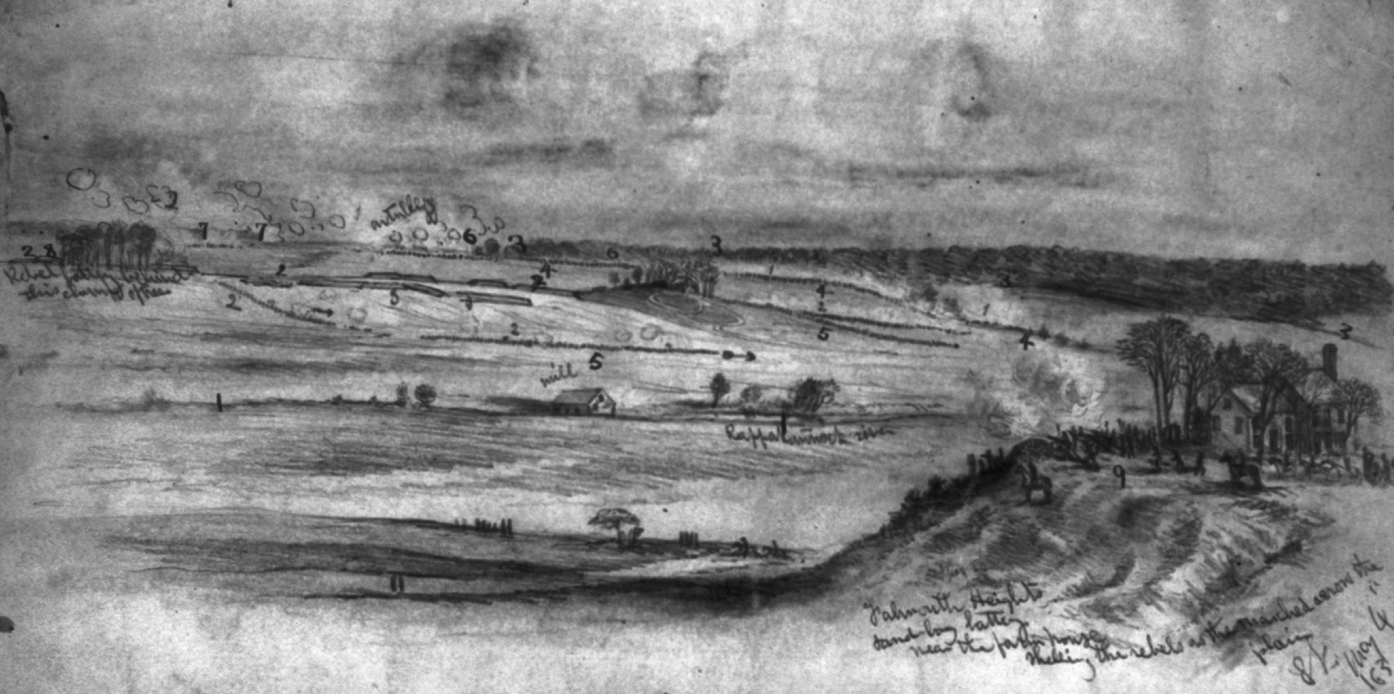
- Attack on Gen. Sedgwick's Corps, seen from the north bank of the Rappahannock River. Forbes, Edwin, artist, May 4, 1863.
Date	May 3, 1863 – May 4, 1863
Location	Spotsylvania County, Virginia
Result	Confederate victory

Belligerents
United States (Union)	(Confederate States of America) CSA (Confederacy)

Commanders and leaders
John Sedgwick	Robert E. Lee

Units involved
VI Corps, Army of the Potomac	Army of Northern Virginia

Strength
23,000	10,000

Casualties and losses
4,611	4,935

The Battle of Salem Church, took place on May 4 respectively, 1863, in Spotsylvania County, Virginia, as part of the Chancellorsville Campaign of the American Civil War.

== Background ==
After occupying Marye's Heights on May 3, following the Second Battle of Fredericksburg, Maj. Gen. John Sedgwick's VI Corps of about 23,000 men marched out on the Orange Plank Road with the objective of reaching his superior Maj. Gen. Joseph Hooker's force at Chancellorsville. He was delayed by Brig. Gen. Cadmus M. Wilcox's brigade of Maj. Gen. Jubal A. Early's force during the afternoon of May 3 before halting at Salem Church.

After receiving word of Sedgwick's breakthrough at Fredericksburg, Confederate Gen. Robert E. Lee detached the division of Lafayette McLaws from the Chancellorsville lines and marched them to Salem Church. McLaws's division arrived at Wilcox's position around Salem Church shortly after noon, reinforced by William Mahone's brigade of Richard H. Anderson's division.

== Battle ==
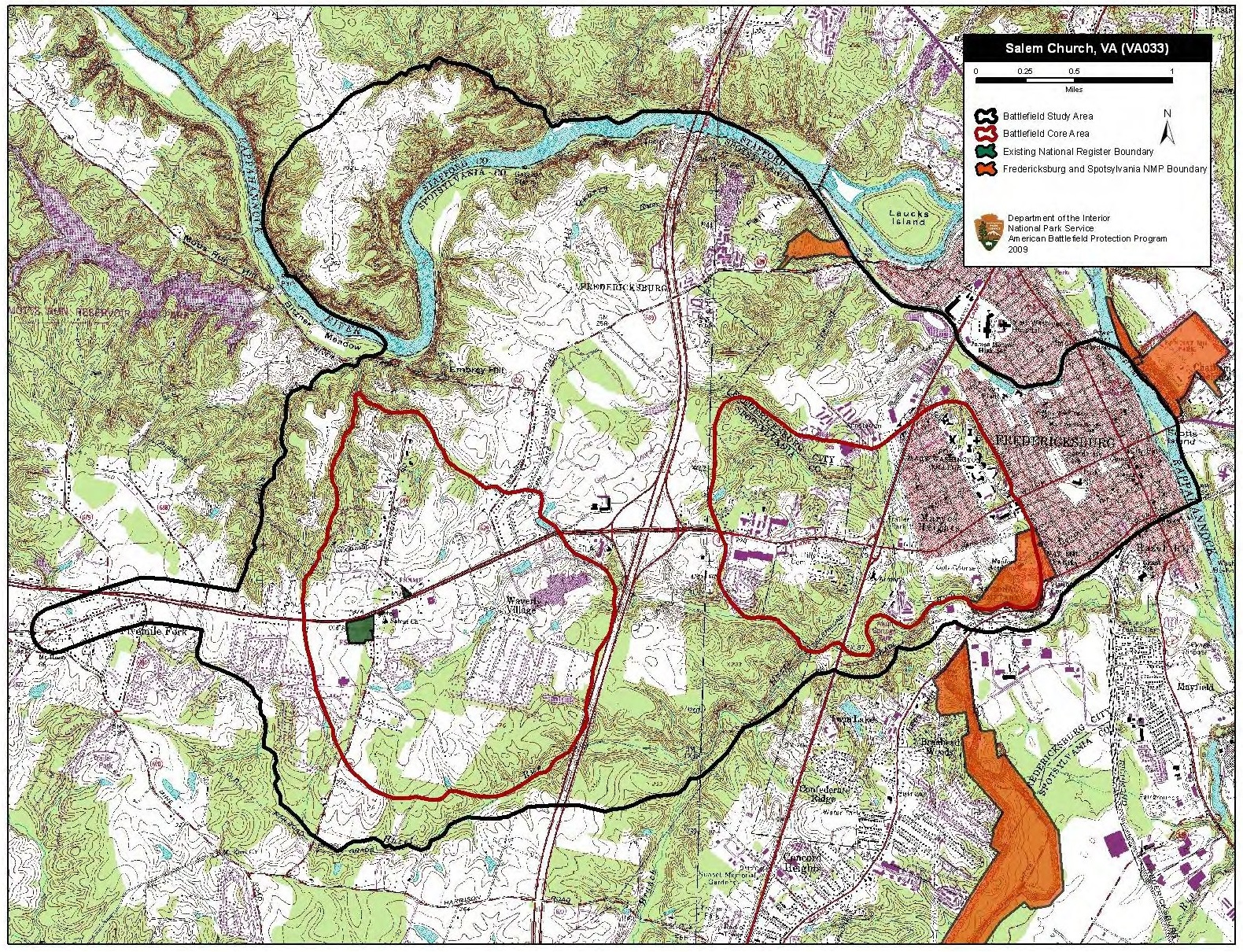
Map of Salem Church Battlefield core and study areas by the American Battlefield Protection Program.

At first Sedgwick believed that he faced a single brigade of infantry, so about 3:30 p.m. he attacked the Confederate positions with only William T. H. Brooks division. Brooks succeeded in driving back McLaws's right flank but a counterattack stopped the Union attack and forced Brooks to retreat back to his original position; sunset ended the combat before any further units were involved. During the night, Lee ordered Early to attack Sedgwick's left flank in the morning, while McLaws attacked the Union right. Also during the night, Sedgwick received no further orders from Hooker other than authorization to retreat across the river if Sedgwick thought the move was necessary.

At 7 a.m. on May 4, Early recaptured Marye's Heights then turned west until he arrived at Sedgwick's main lines, halting after coming under heavy fire. During the remainder of the morning, Early launched a series of uncoordinated attacks on Sedgwick's position, all of which were defeated.

By 11 a.m. on May 4 General Sedgwick was facing three directions; west towards Lee's main body and the Salem Church, south towards Anderson's division, and East towards Early's division. When General Sedgwick heard rumors that reinforcements from Richmond had arrived he felt his situation was becoming more difficult. He already had a six mile long line held by 20,000 troops against now 25,000 Confederates with only a bridgehead to retreat upon in failure, with more Confederates possibly arriving and himself with over 5,000 casualties he was concerned. He reported his difficult situation to General Hooker and requested the main army assist him. General Hooker, however, replied not to attack unless the main army did the same. Meanwhile, General Lee arrived at McLaws' headquarters at 11 a.m. and McLaws informed him that he did not feel strong enough to launch an attack and asked for reinforcements. Anderson was ordered to bring the other three brigades of his division and position them between McLaws and Early; he then launched additional attacks, which were also defeated.

== Aftermath ==
General Benham of the U.S. Engineering Corps had added a bridge at Scott's Dam helping communicate with General Hooker. When the retreat was planned, General Benham on May 4 added a second bridge and he and General Sedgwick agreed to cross at night to avoid losing a large portion of his corps. At 6pm on the 4th of May the final Confederate attack was made and repulsed. The Union 6th Corps began retreating to a pre-planned smaller line closer to the bridges, and began their retreat without losses. After dark, Sedgwick sent Hooker a message recommending that the VI Corps retreat across the river. After Hooker sent his approval at 1 a.m., Sedgwick withdrew across two pontoon bridges at Banks' Ford, completing the retreat about 4 a.m. Hearing that Sedgwick had been repulsed, Hooker abandoned the entire campaign, recrossing the main body of the Union army on the night of May 5 into May 6 to the north bank of the Rappahannock River back towards the Federal camp at Falmouth.
