= Second Battle of Fredericksburg =

Battle in the American Civil War

Coordinates: 38.29575°N 77.46844°W

Second Battle of Fredericksburg (Second Battle of Marye's Heights)
- Part of the American Civil War
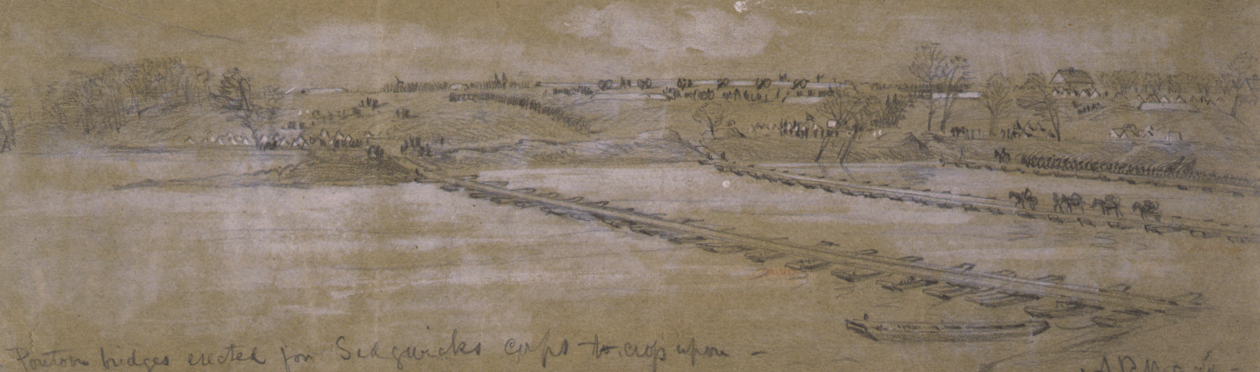
- Pontoon bridges erected for Sedgwick's corps to cross upon, Alfred R. Waud, artist
Date	May 3, 1863
Location	Fredericksburg, Virginia
Result	Union victory

Belligerents
United States (Union)	(Confederate States of America) Confederate States

Commanders and leaders
John Sedgwick	Jubal Early

Units involved
Army of the Potomac	Army of Northern Virginia

Strength
27,100	12,000

Casualties and losses
1,100	700

The Second Battle of Fredericksburg, also known as the Second Battle of Marye's Heights, took place on May 3, 1863, in Fredericksburg, Virginia, as part of the Chancellorsville Campaign of the American Civil War.

== Background ==
Confederate Gen. Robert E. Lee left Maj. Gen. Jubal A. Early to hold Fredericksburg on May 1, while he marched west with the rest of the Army of Northern Virginia to deal with Union Maj. Gen. Joseph Hooker's main thrust at Chancellorsville with four corps of the Army of the Potomac. Early had his own division, along with William Barksdale's brigade from McLaws' division and cannons from the artillery reserve; Early was assisted by Brigadier General William Pendleton of the artillery reserve. Cadmus Wilcox's brigade arrived on May 3, increasing Early's strength to 12,000 men and 45 cannons. Most of the Confederate force was deployed south of Fredericksburg.

Early was ordered by Lee to watch the remaining Union force near Fredericksburg; if he was attacked and defeated, he was to retreat southward to protect the Confederate supply lines. If the Union force moved to reinforce Hooker, then Early was to leave a covering force and rejoin Lee with the remainder of his troops. On May 2, misunderstanding his orders, Early left one brigade at Fredericksburg and started the rest of his force towards Chancellorsville; Lee corrected the misunderstanding and Early then returned to his positions that night before Sedgwick discovered the Confederate retreat.

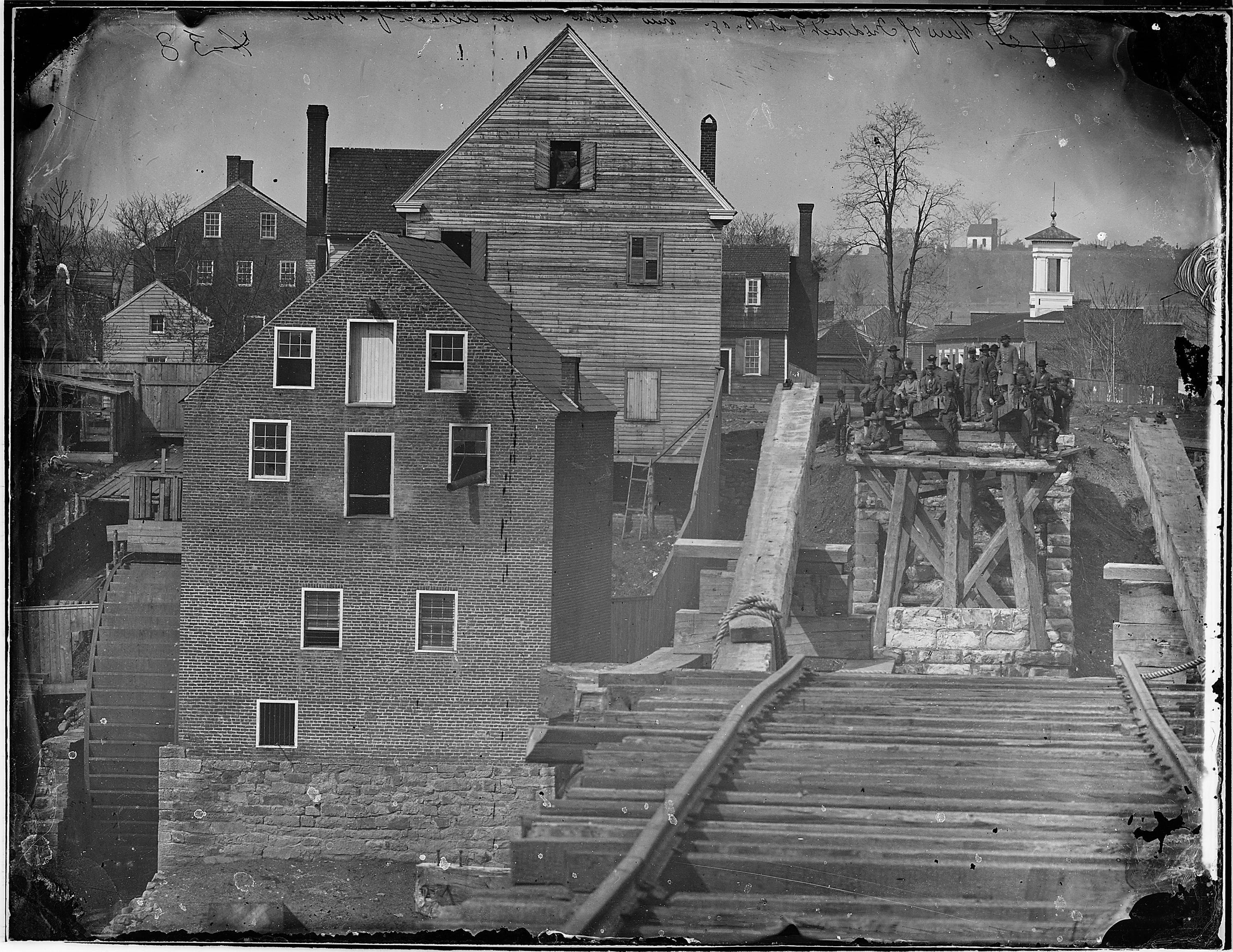
Here is the only known instance in which the Union photographers succeeded in getting a near view of the Confederate troops. Number 111-B-438 by Captain Andrew J. Russell, Fredericksburg from the ruined Rappahannock Railroad Bridge, late April 1863; photo shows the other bank of Rappahannock; Confederate officers and troops are shown gathered on the bank. This photo was taken at a distance of one mile.

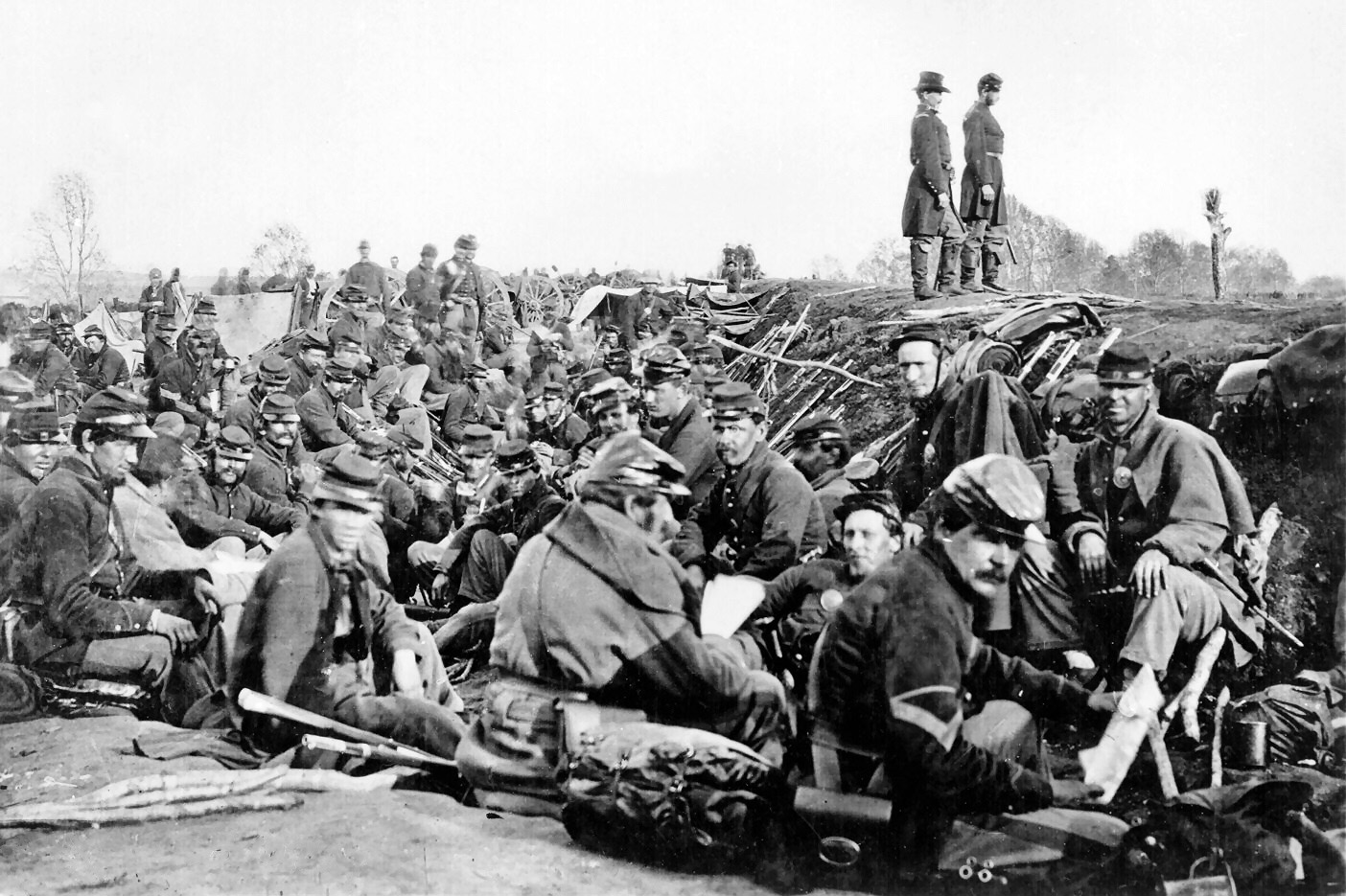
Number 111-B-157.by Captain Andrew J. Russell-Union Troops before Fredericksburg May 1863

Maj. Gen. John Sedgwick was left near Fredericksburg with the VI Corps, the I Corps, and the II Corps division of Brig. Gen. John Gibbon. Hooker's plan called for Sedgwick to demonstrate near the city in order to deceive Lee about the Union plan. The VI and II Corps seized control of several crossings on April 29, laying down pontoon bridges in the early morning hours, and the divisions of William T. H. Brooks and James S. Wadsworth crossed the river. The I Corps was ordered to reinforce the main army at Chancellorsville during the night of May 1. During the evening of May 2, Sedgwick received orders to attack Early with his remaining forces.

== Battle ==
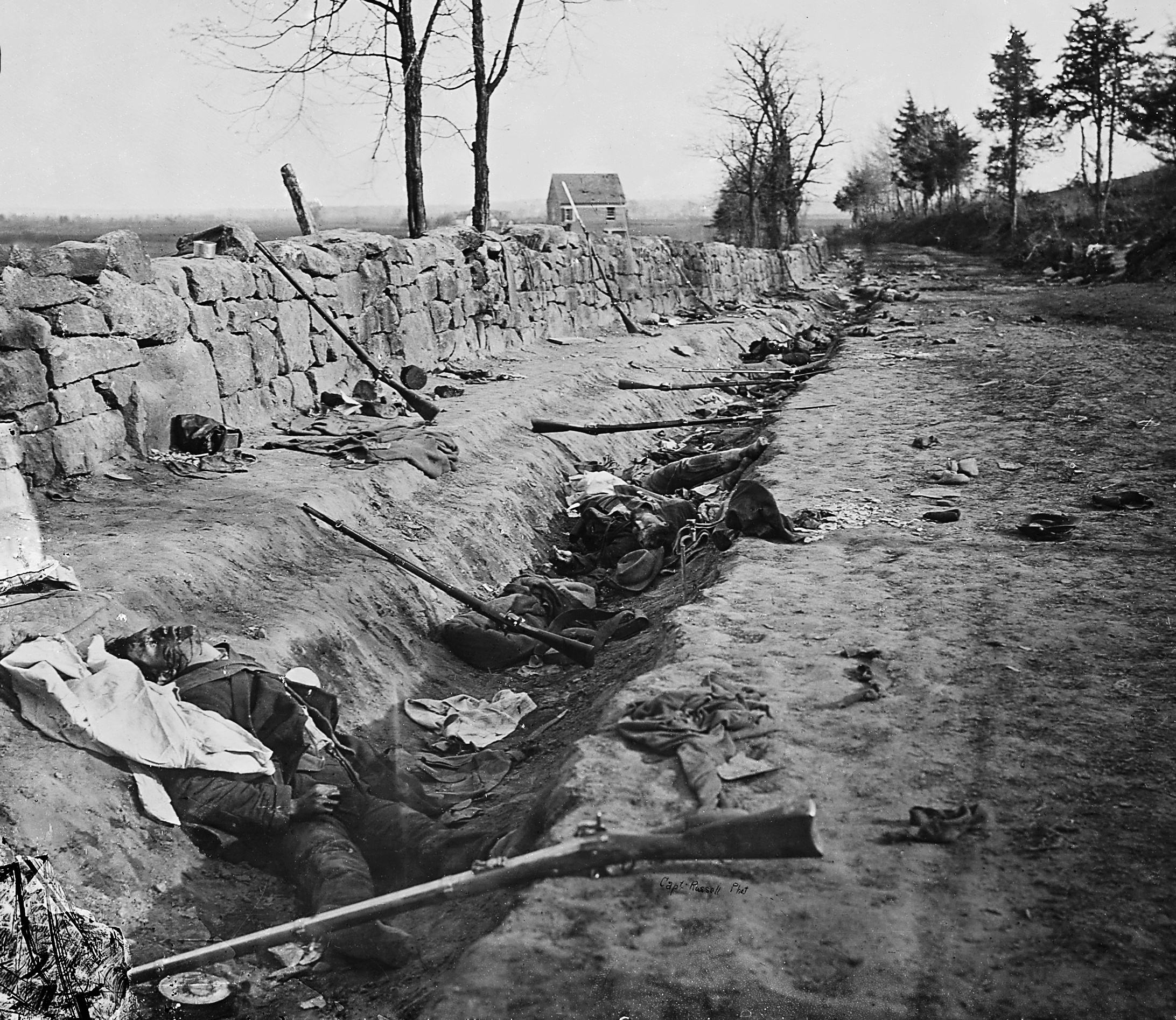
111-B-514. By Captain Andrew J Russell. Confederate dead behind the stone wall of Marye's Heights, Fredericksburg, Virginia, May 3, 1863-the 6th Maine penetrated the CS Lines at this point

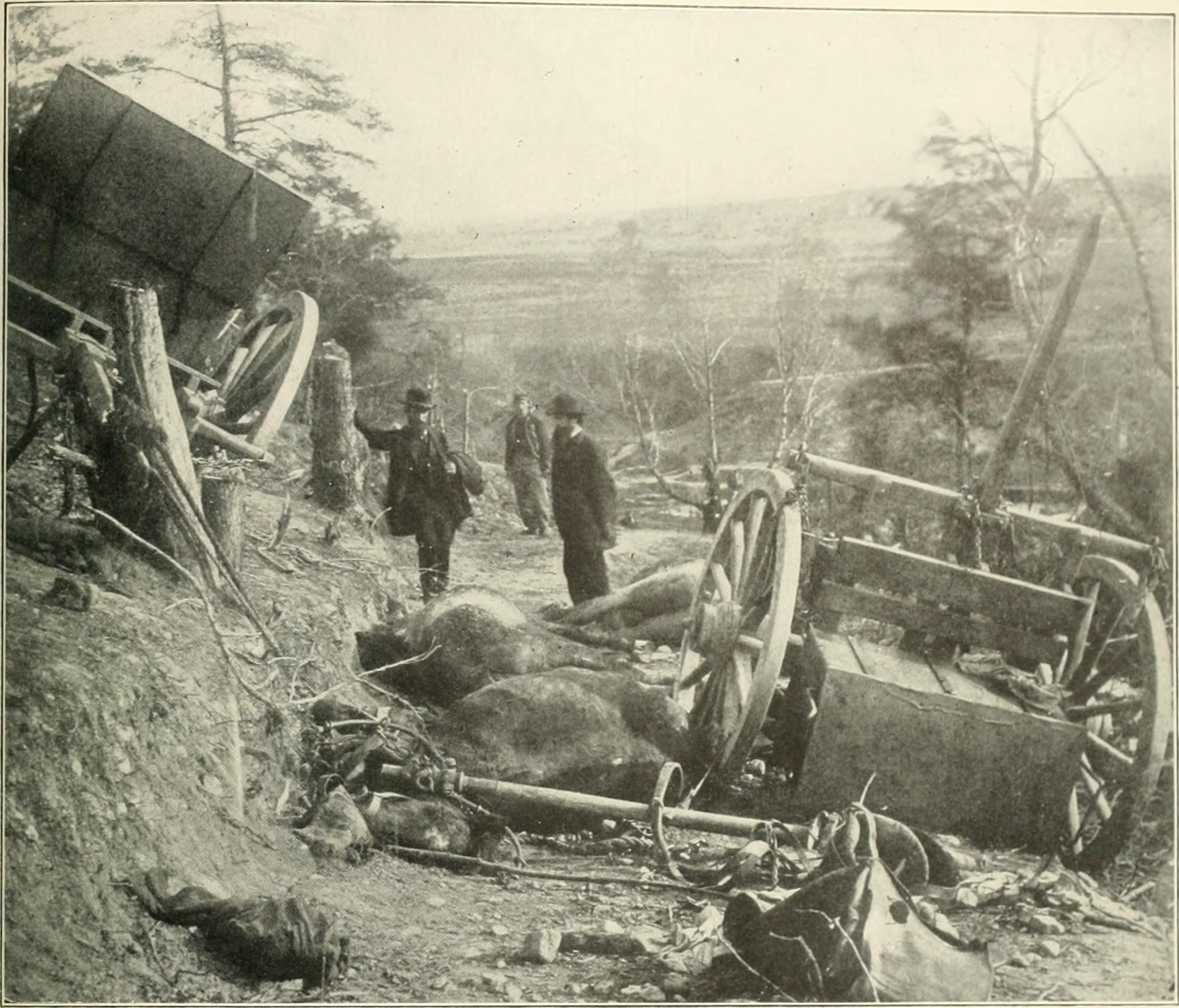
General Haupt and W. Wright, Superintendent of the Military Railroad survey a Confederate Artillery Battery caisson on Maryes Heights, Fredericksburg, Virginia that was wrecked by Union artillery fire May 5, 1863. This was of the Washington Artillery of eight artillery pieces, six guns were surrounded under command of Capt Squires and Lt Owen

Sedgwick moved his forces into Fredericksburg during dawn on May 3, uniting with Gibbon's division which had crossed the river just before dawn. Sedgwick originally planned to attack the ends of Marye's Heights but a canal and a stream blocked the Union forces. He then decided to launch an attack on the Confederate center on the heights, which was manned by Barksdale's brigade, with John Newton's division; this attack was defeated. Soldiers of the 7th Massachusetts caught a glimpse of the Confederate right flank and thought it looked unprotected. One of their officer requested a brief truce to gather in their wounded. Without consulting his brigade commander, Colonel Thomas M. Griffin of the 18th Mississippi Infantry granted it, allowing the Union soldiers to examine it more closely.

Sedgwick launched another attack against this flank and Barksdale's front using elements from all three VI Corps divisions, which pushed the Confederate forces off the ridge, capturing some artillery and the 18th and 21st Mississippi Regiments. The first men to mount the stone wall were from the 5th Wisconsin and the 6th Maine Infantry regiments. Barksdale retreated to Lee's Hill, where he attempted to make another stand but was again forced to retreat southward.

== Aftermath ==
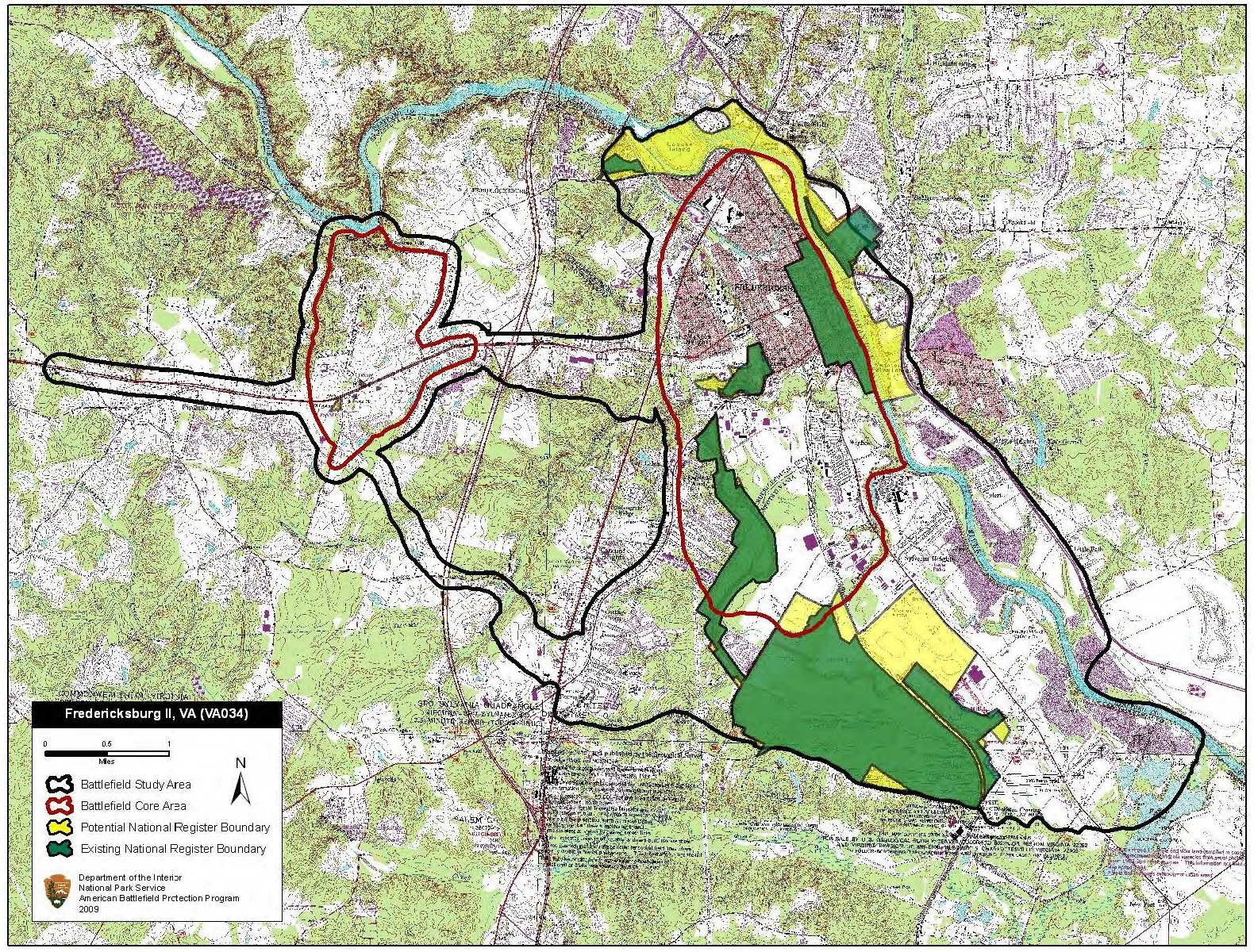
Map of Fredericksburg II Battlefield core and study areas by the American Battlefield Protection Program

Confederate casualties totaled 700 men and four cannons. Early withdrew with his division two miles to the south, while Wilcox withdrew westward, slowing Sedgwick's advance. When he learned of the Confederate defeat, Lee started moving two divisions east to stop Sedgwick. Following the campaign, Early became embroiled in an argument with Barksdale over what Barksdale considered a slight to his brigade in a newspaper letter that Early had written; the exchange continued until Lee ordered the two generals to cease.

Sedgwick had lost 1,100 men during the engagement. At first he started to pursue Early's division but then followed the orders he received the previous day and started west along the Plank Road towards Hooker's army at Chancellorsville. Gibbon's division was left in Fredericksburg to guard the city.
