= Battle of Hoke's Run =

Battle of the American Civil War

Coordinates: 39.5450°N 77.9063°W

- Part of the American Civil War
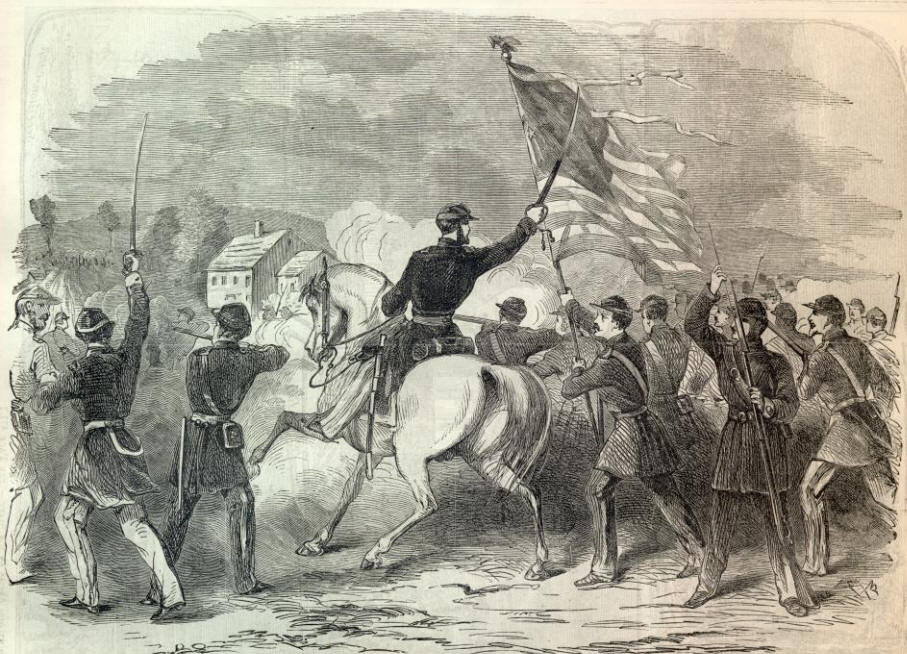
- Colonel John C. Starkweather with his Wisconsin regiment
Date	July 2, 1861
Location	Berkeley County, West Virginia
Result	Union victory

Belligerents
United States (Union)	(Confederate States of America) CSA (Confederacy)

Commanders and leaders
Robert Patterson	Stonewall Jackson

Units involved
Army of the Shenandoah	Jackson's Brigade

Strength
8,000 (2 brigades)	4,000 (1 brigade)

Casualties and losses
23	91

The Battle of Hoke's Run, also known as the Battle of Falling Waters or Battle of Hainesville, took place on July 2, 1861, in Berkeley County, Virginia (now West Virginia) as part of the Manassas campaign of the American Civil War. Notable as an early engagement of Confederate Colonel Thomas J. Jackson and his Brigade of Virginia Volunteers, nineteen days before their famous nickname would originate, this brief skirmish was hailed by both sides as a stern lesson to the other. Acting precisely upon the orders of a superior officer about how to operate in the face of superior numbers, Jackson's Confederate forces resisted General Robert Patterson's Union forces briefly and then slowly retreated over several miles.

== Opposing forces ==
=== Union order of battle ===
The Department of Pennsylvania represented the Union Army at the Battle of Hoke's Run during the outset of the American Civil War. Although the entire force crossed the Potomac River into Virginia, the First and Sixth Brigades were primarily engaged.

==== Military rank ====
- MG = Major General
- BG = Brigadier General
- Col = Colonel
- Ltc = Lieutenant Colonel
- Maj = Major
- Cpt = Captain

==== Other abbreviations ====
- w = wounded
- mw = mortally wounded
- k = killed
- c = captured

==== Department of Pennsylvania ====
MG Robert Patterson

Division	Brigade	Regiments and Others
First Division; BG George Cadwallader	1st Brigade Col George H. Thomas	6th Pennsylvania: Col James Nagle; 21st Pennsylvania: Col John F. Ballier; 23rd Pennsylvania: Col Charles P. Dare; Philadelphia City Troop (cavalry) (1 Company): Cpt Thomas James; 2nd U.S. Cavalry (3 Companies); Heavy Artillery, 1 Battery: Cpt Abner Doubleday
First Division; BG George Cadwallader	3rd Brigade BG Edward C. Williams	7th Pennsylvania: Col William H. Irwin; 8th Pennsylvania: Col Anthony H. Emley; 10th Pennsylvania: Col Sullivan A. Meredith; 20th Pennsylvania: Col William H. Gray
First Division; BG George Cadwallader	4th Brigade Col Dixon S. Miles (until June 17); Col. J. C. Longenecker	9th Pennsylvania: Col Henry C. Longnecker; 13th Pennsylvania: Col Thomas A. Rowley; 16th Pennsylvania: Col Thomas A. Ziegle; 2nd & 3rd U.S. (detachments): Maj Oliver L. Shepherd
Second Division; MG William H. Keim	2nd Brigade BG G. C. Wynkoop	1st Pennsylvania: Col Samuel Yohe; 2nd Pennsylvania: Col Frederick S. Stumbaugh; 3rd Pennsylvania: Col Francis P. Minier
Second Division; MG William H. Keim	5th Brigade BG J. S. Negley	14th Pennsylvania: Col John W. Johnston; 15th Pennsylvania: Col Richard A. Oakford; 24th Pennsylvania: Col Joshua T. Owen
Second Division; MG William H. Keim	6th Brigade Col. J. J. Abercrombie	4th Connecticut: Col Levi Woodhouse; 11th Pennsylvania: Col Phaon Jarrett; Philadelphia Independent Rangers: Cpt McMullen; 1st Wisconsin: Col John C. Starkweather
Third Division; MG Charles W. Sandford	7th Brigade Col Charles P. Stone	1st New Hampshire: Col Mason Tappan; 9th New York State Militia: Col John W. Styles; 17th Pennsylvania: Col Francis E. Patterson; 25th Pennsylvania (Companies D, F, G, I & K): Col Henry L. Cake; District of Columbia (detachment): Cpt John R. Smead; U. S. Cavalry: Cpt William T. Magruder; 4th United States Artillery Battery F: Lt Alexander Piper
Third Division; MG Charles W. Sandford	8th Brigade Col C. Schwarzwaelder; Col Daniel Butterfield	5th New York State Militia: Col C. Schwarzwaelder; 12th New York State Militia: Col Daniel Butterfield; 19th New York: Col John S. Clarke; 28th New York: Col Dudley Donnelly
Unattached		11th Indiana: Col Lew Wallace; 1st U. S. Artillery, Battery E; 1st U. S. Artillery, Battery H

=== Confederate order of battle ===
The following Confederate Army units and commanders fought in the Battle of Hoke's Run.

==== Military rank ====
- BG = Brigadier General
- Col = Colonel
- Ltc = Lieutenant Colonel
- Cpt = Captain

==== Army of the Shenandoah ====
BG Joseph E. Johnston

Brigade	Regiments and Others
First Brigade Col Thomas J. Jackson	2nd Virginia Infantry: Col James W. Allen; 4th Virginia Infantry: Col James F. Preston; 5th Virginia Infantry: Col Kenton Harper; 27th Virginia Infantry: Col William W. Gordon; 1st Rockbridge Artillery: Cpt William N. Pendleton
Cavalry	1st Virginia Cavalry: Ltc J.E.B. Stuart

== Battle ==
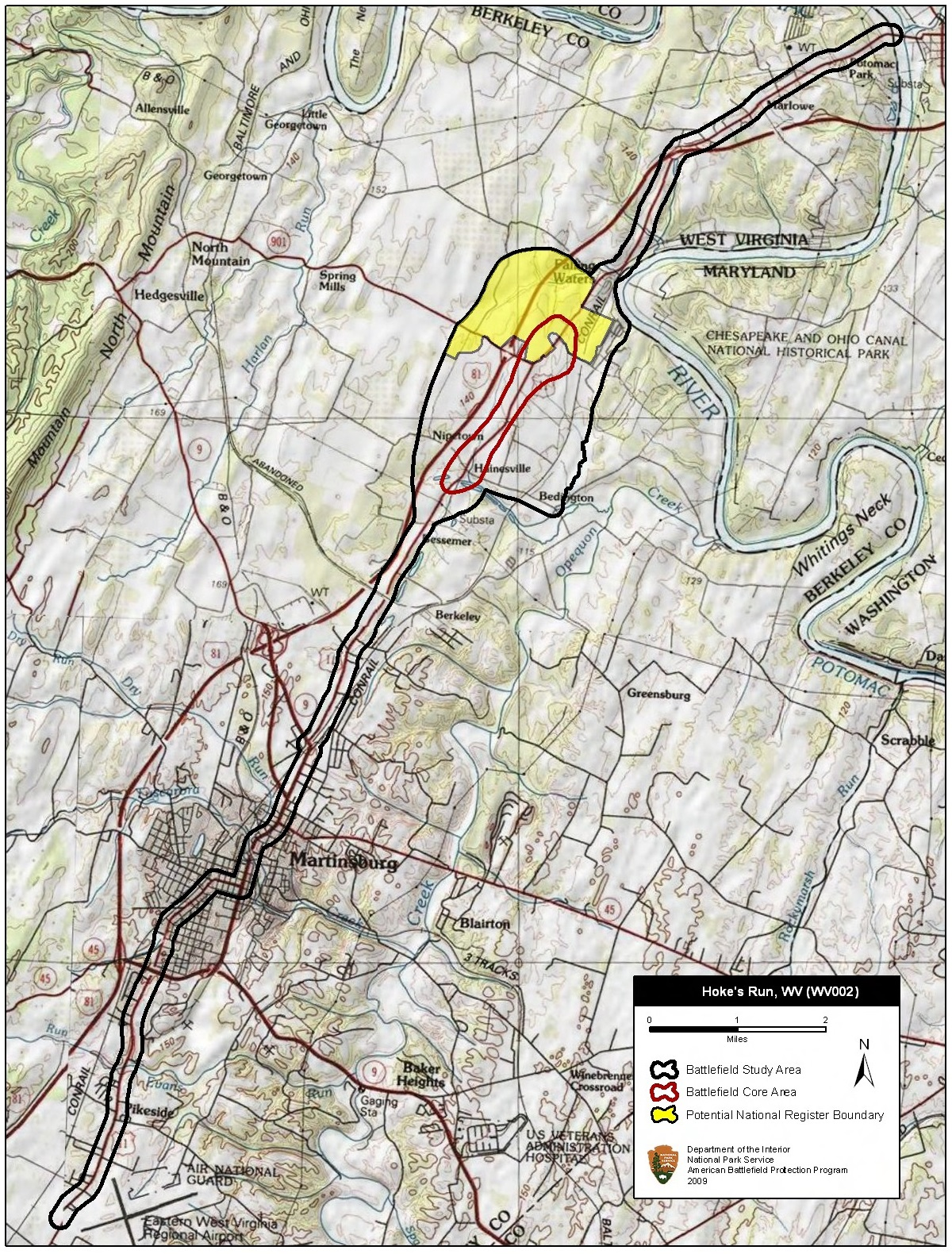
Map of Hoke's Run Battlefield core and study areas by the American Battlefield Protection Program

On July 2, Maj. Gen. Robert Patterson's division crossed the Potomac River near Williamsport, Maryland and marched on the main road to Martinsburg. Near Hoke's Run, the Union brigades of Cols. John J. Abercrombie and George H. Thomas encountered regiments of Col. Thomas J. Jackson's Confederate brigade, driving them back slowly. Jackson accomplished his orders to delay the Federal advance, withdrawing before Patterson's larger force.

== Casualties ==
Estimates of casualties sustained during the battle vary. The National Park Service quotes Union as 23 and Confederate as 91 (without differentiating types of casualties). Kennedy cites 75 Union deaths and 25 Confederate deaths. In his Official Report, Major-General Robert Patterson states the number of Confederate deaths as "over sixty" but does not describe Union casualties. One Confederate battle flag was captured by the First Wisconsin, but the surrendering Confederate regiment is not identified.
After the time for propagandizing the casualty figures ended, the following Union regiments precisely reported the sacrifices of their comrades-in-arms:

- First Wisconsin Infantry: 1 killed, 5 wounded, 1 captured.
- Eleventh Pennsylvania Infantry: 1 killed, 10 wounded, none captured.
- Fifteenth Pennsylvania Infantry: 1 wounded, 35 captured (six of whom died in Confederate prisons within nine months).

In addition to the above, "The Official Records of the Union and Confederates Armies, 1861-1865" and "History of Pennsylvania volunteers, 1861-5" state the following casualties:

- 2nd US cavalry: 2 captured
- 14th Pennsylvania: 12 Captured (the 1st Virginia Cavalry took 47 prisoners from the company A, 14th and company I, 15th Pennsylvania)
- McMullen's Rangers: 1 killed and 1 wounded (from the Sunbury American)

Total casualties for Union force: 3 killed, 17 wounded, and 50 captured

For the Confederacy:

- 1st Virginia Cavalry: 2 killed and 1 wounded
- 2nd Virginia Infantry: no record/report (casualties unknown)
- 5th Virginia Infantry 9 killed and 11 wounded

Total casualties for Confederate force (incomplete): 11 killed, 12 wounded

== Aftermath ==
On July 3, Patterson occupied Martinsburg, but made no further aggressive moves until July 15, when he marched to Bunker Hill. Instead of moving on Winchester, however, Patterson turned east to Charles Town and then withdrew to Harpers Ferry.

Patterson's retrograde movement took pressure off Confederate forces in the Shenandoah Valley and allowed Brig. Gen. Joseph E. Johnston's Army of the Shenandoah to march to support Brig. Gen. P.G.T. Beauregard at Manassas Junction. Following the stunning Union defeat at the First Battle of Bull Run on July 21, the Union commander at Hoke's Run, Robert Patterson, was assigned popular blame without participating while the Confederate commander at Hoke's Run was assigned glory for his actions during the first major battle of the war.
