= 43rd Pennsylvania Militia Infantry Regiment =

American Civil War cavalry unit

43rd Regiment, Pennsylvania Militia Infantry
- Pennsylvania flag
- Active: October 31, 1861 – August 1, 1865
- Country: US
- Allegiance: Union
- Branch: United States Army, Pennsylvania Militia
- Type: Infantry
- Engagements: Gettysburg campaign

Commanders
- Colonel: William W. Stott

The 43rd Regiment, Pennsylvania Infantry Militia was a militia infantry regiment called out by Pennsylvania Governor Andrew Curtin for home defense service in the Union Army during the American Civil War from July 6, 1863, to 1865 August 13, 1863.

== History ==
Shortly after Lee's Army of Northern Virginia defeated Hooker's Army of the Potomac during the Chancellorsville Campaign (April 30 – May 6, 1863), Lee decided upon a second invasion of the North. Such a move would upset Union plans for the summer campaigning season, give Lee the ability to maneuver his army away from its defensive positions behind the Rappahannock River, and allow the Confederates to live off the bounty of the rich northern farms while giving war-ravaged Virginia a much needed break. Lee's army could also threaten Philadelphia, Baltimore, and Washington, and encourage the growing peace movement in the North.

Numerous misunderstandings shaped Lee's strategy. He misread Northern opinion by his reliance on anti-war Copperhead newspapers. Lee knew he was seriously short of supplies for his own army, so he planned the campaign primarily as a full-scale raid that would seize supplies. He wrote:

If we can baffle them [Yankees] in their various designs this year & our people are true to our cause...our success will be certain.... [and] next year there will be a great change in public opinion at the North. The Republicans will be destroyed [in the 1864 presidential election] & I think the friends of peace will become so strong as that the next administration will go in on that basis. We have only therefore to resist manfully.

Lee was overconfident of the morale and equipment of his "invincible" veterans as a result of their performance at Chancellorsville; he fantasized about a definitive war-winning triumph:

[The Yankees will be] broken down with hunger and hard marching, strung out on a long line and much demoralized when they come into Pennsylvania. I shall throw an overwhelming force on their advance, crush it, follow up the success, drive one corps back on another, and by successive repulses and surprises, before they can concentrate, create a panic and virtually destroy the army. [Then] the war will be over and we shall achieve the recognition of our independence.

Davis had a different strategy and wanted Lee to reduce Union pressure threatening their garrison at Vicksburg, Mississippi, but he rejected its suggestions to send troops to provide direct aid, arguing for the value of a concentrated blow in the Northeast.

Lee's strategy was the same as the one he employed in the Maryland campaign of 1862. Again, after Chancellorsville he had supreme confidence in the men of his army, assuming they could handle any challenge he gave them.

In response to Lee's invasion, Lincoln issued a proclamation calling for 100,000 volunteers from four states to serve a term of six months "to repel the threatened and imminent invasion of Pennsylvania." Pennsylvania Governor Andrew Curtin called for 50,000 volunteers to take arms as volunteer militia; only 8,000 initially responded, and Curtin asked for help from the New York State Militia. Gov. Joel Parker of New Jersey also responded by sending troops to Pennsylvania. The War Department created two new departments, the Department of the Monongahela, (Note: It encompassed the portion of Pennsylvania, west of Johnstown and the Laurel Hill range, and portions of West Virginia and Ohio, with headquarters at Pittsburg.) commanded by MGEN William T. H. Brooks, and the Department of the Susquehanna, (Note: comprising the remaining portion of Pennsylvania, with headquarters, at Harrisburg) commanded by MGEN Darius N. Couch, to coordinate defensive efforts in Pennsylvania.

Pittsburgh, Harrisburg, and Philadelphia were considered potential targets and defensive preparations were made. In Harrisburg, the state government removed its archives from the town for safekeeping. Crouch set up his headquarters and began coordinating the call up.In much of southern Pennsylvania, the Gettysburg campaign became widely known as the "emergency of 1863". The military campaign resulted in the displacement of thousands of refugees from Maryland and Pennsylvania who fled northward and eastward to avoid the oncoming Confederates, and resulted in a shift in demographics in several southern Pennsylvania boroughs and counties.

The militia was gathering while the Battle of Gettysburg was fought. The rapid movements of the main armies, and the fact that So rapid were the movements of the armies, and so soon after the call for the militia was made, that unknown to them, the militiamen had scarcely arrived in camp, and been organized, before the danger was past. The 43rd regiment was mustered into service on July 6, 1863, in the militia armory at Reading. (Note: Along with the 38th, 39th, 41st, 42nd, 48th, and 53rd) It joined the garrison in the state capital the next day. Since the invaders were still north of the Potomac, and since John Hunt Morgan had crossed the Ohio at Brandenburg, KY on the July 7, and began raiding in southern Indiana, Curtin kept the 43rd and the rest of the militia on active duty. Cutting east across the country, burning mills, destroying railroads and telegraph lines, and seizing money and horses on the inhabitants. As in Pennsylvania, the Indiana and Ohio militias sprang up on all sides, to harass him, but not in sufficient force to corner him. Generals Hobson and Shackleford were following him with cavalry, and gunboats sent out from Cincinnati were patrolling the river. Morgan had already heard of Lee's defeat at Gettysburg, and was desperately trying to make good his escape across the Ohio, until he was captured at Salineville, Ohio on July 20. (Note: From the John Hunt Morgan article: Although Morgan's Raid was breathlessly followed by the Northern and Southern press and caused the Union leadership considerable concern, it is now regarded as little more than a showy but ultimately futile sidelight to the war. Furthermore, it was done in direct violation of Morgan's orders from General Braxton Bragg not to cross the river. Despite the raiders' best efforts, Union forces had amassed nearly 110,000 militia in Illinois, Indiana and Ohio; dozens of United States Navy gunboats along the Ohio; and strong Federal cavalry forces, which doomed the raid from the beginning. The cost of the raid to the Federals was extensive, with claims for compensation still being filed against the U.S. government well into the early-20th century. However, the Confederacy's loss of Morgan's light cavalry far outweighed the benefits achieved by the raid.)

Lee had escaped across the Potomac on July 13 and with the capture of Morgan, the Rebel invasion of 1863 ended. Further service, for which the militia had been called, was no longer required, and during the months of August and September, the majority of the militia were mustered out. The militiamen of the 43rd in garrison at Harrisburg, had escaped contact with the Lee's highly trained, experienced, and deadly veterans. The men of the 43rd mustered out on August 13, 1863.

=== Companies in this Regiment with the Counties of Origin ===
Men often enlisted in a company recruited in the counties where they lived though not always. After many battles, companies might be combined because so many men were killed or wounded.

The regimental staff officers that were mobilized with the 43rd included Colonel William W. Stott; Lieutenant Colonel George W. Arnold, Major Henry W. Petrikin, and Adjutant, George E. Newlin.

As a militia regiment, the men enlisted in companies recruited in their counties of residence.

- Company A – From Chester County
- Company B – From Chester County
- Company C – From Chester County
- Company D – From Union County
- Company E – From Chester County and Philadelphia County
- Company F – From Montgomery County
- Company G – From Bucks County
- Company H – From Chester County
- Company I – From Montgomery County
- Company K – From Lycoming County

== See also ==
- The Gettysburg Campaign
- Pennsylvania in the American Civil War
