= 24th Pennsylvania Infantry Regiment =

Union Army infantry regiment

24th Pennsylvania Volunteer Infantry
- Pennsylvania flag
- Active: May 1, 1861 – August 10, 1861
- Country: United States
- Allegiance: Union
- Branch: United States Army; Union Army
- Type: Infantry

Commanders
- Colonel: Joshua T. Owen

The 24th Pennsylvania Volunteer Infantry was a three-month infantry regiment that served in the Union Army during the American Civil War.

== Service ==
This regiment was organized at Philadelphia and mustered into federal service on May 1, 1861. This regiment, composed mainly of men of Irish descent, was the outgrowth of a Philadelphia militia regiment and was recruited in that city, with the exception of one company from Wilmington, Del.

After mustering in, it went into camp near Philadelphia, the men being treated well by the city's people. The regiment then proceeded to Hagerstown, via Chambersburg, and arrived at Camp Porter on June 22, where it was assigned to the 5th Brigade, 2nd Division. It took part in the maneuvers near Martinsburg, Bunker Hill and Charlestown. On July 27, Major General Robert Patterson (Note: The 69-year old Patterson was a Cappagh, County Tyrone, Ireland born United States soldier. The son of a rebel during the 1798 Rebellion who was banished from the United Kingdom, had emigrated to Philadelphia in 1799 with his family. He volunteered for service during the War of 1812, he rose from the rank of captain to colonel in the Pennsylvania Militia, before joining the United States Army. He was discharged in 1815 as a captain. Patterson returned to commercial pursuits in manufacturing and mills, getting involved in Pennsylvania politics. He had a busy commercial and political career but interrupted it again to serve in the Mexican-American War as a major general of volunteers. He saw action during the Siege of Veracruz and at the Battle of Cerro Gordo, where he was wounded. Mustering out, he returned to Philadelphia and resumed his business career becoming quite wealthy. The American Civil War brought Patterson back to military service. He was appointed major general of Pennsylvania volunteers and commanded the Department of Pennsylvania and the Army of the Shenandoah. In 1861, Winfield Scott, now General-in-Chief of the U.S. Army, gave Patterson vague orders to retake Harpers Ferry. Despite inflicting an early defeat on Stonewall Jackson at the Battle of Hoke's Run, he is remembered mostly for crucially failing to stop Confederate General Joseph E. Johnston from joining forces with P. G. T. Beauregard at the First Battle of Bull Run. Although still blamed for this defeat, Brig. Gen. Joseph E. Johnston, however, admit that Patterson's army had largely deterred him from pursuing the U. S. troops in retreat following the battle. Patterson mustered out of the Army in late July 1861.) asked the regiment to remain on duty until the replacing regiments arrived. On August 9, the regiment moved to Harper's Ferry. The next day it entrained for Baltimore and arrived in Philadelphia in the afternoon. It was mustered out at Philadelphia, on August 10, 1861, having remained in the service two weeks longer than the term of enlistment..

=== Organizational affiliation ===
Attached to Brig. Gen. James S. Negley's (Note: The 34-year old Negley was a Pittsburgh-born United States soldier, farmer, railroader, and U.S. Representative from the state of Pennsylvania. Like Patterson, he was a veteran of the Mexican-American War and the Pennsylvania militia. Later in the war, he played a key role in the Union victory at the Battle of Stones River. After the war, Negley was elected as a Republican to the United States Congress in 1868 and served from 1869 to 1875. In 1877, during the Pittsburgh Railway Riots, Negley served as commander of the militia organized by the city of Pittsburgh to maintain order in the city. He was also active in veterans' affairs, managing the National Home for Disabled Volunteer Soldiers from 1874 to 1878 and from 1882 to 1888. He was re-elected to Congress in 1884 and served from 1885 to 1887. After retiring from politics, he was engaged in the railroad industry. In 1897, he became a Veteran Companion of the Pennsylvania Commandery of the Military Order of Foreign Wars. Negley died in Plainfield, New Jersey, aged 74, and was buried in Pittsburgh) 5th Brigade, Brig. Gen. William H. Keim's (Note: The 48-year old Keim was a Reading-born United States soldier, and U.S. Representative from the state of Pennsylvania. Like Patterson and Negley, he was a long-time member of the Pennsylvania militia. Keim anticipated rebellion and as early as January 21, 1861, he notified a fellow Reading militia commander to keep his unit ready for immediate service if war should break out. Following the Baltimore riot of 1861, the mayor of the city, with approval from Governor Hicks, ordered a militia unit, the Baltimore County Horse Guards, to destroy the railroad bridge north of Baltimore in order to prevent more Federal troops from entering the city. A lieutenant in the Horse Guards, John Merryman, was arrested by Keim. His arrest and imprisonment eventually led to an important Federal case on the suspension of habeas corpus. Initially, Keim enlisted for a term of 3 months and, due primarily to his political ties, he was commissioned as a major general of Pennsylvania Volunteers on April 20, 1861. He was honorably mustered out on July 21, 1861, and returned to Reading, but as the war lengthened, Keim decided to re-enlist, this time for a term of 3 years. Commissioned as a brigadier general of volunteers on December 20, 1861, Keim died of typhus while in service at Harrisburg, Pennsylvania, in 1862.) 2nd Division, of Patterson's Army.

=== List of battles ===
The regiment participated in no battles during its service.

=== Detailed service ===
- Left Philadelphia for Chambersburg, PA, on June 3
- Attached to Patterson's Army, June 3
- Moved to Hagerstown, MD, June 16
- Moved to Williamsport, MD June 18
- Garrisoned Camp Porter, June 22
- Occupied Martinsburg, VA July 3
- Advanced on Bunker Hill July 15
- At Charlestown, VA July 17
- Moved to Harper's Ferry, VA August 9
- Moved to Philadelphia and mustered out August 10, 1861.

== Casualties ==
The regiment suffered no losses during its service.

== Regimental staff ==
- Colonel Joshua T. Owen
- Lieutenant-Colonel Dennis Heenan
- Major Dennis O'Kane

== See also ==
- List of Pennsylvania Civil War Units
- Pennsylvania in the Civil War
