= 5th New York State Militia =

- Active: April 16, 1861 (mustered in) to August 7, 1861 (mustered out)
- Country: United States
- Allegiance: Union
- Branch: Union Army
- Type: Infantry
- Size: 600 (Note: As reported back to Adjutant General Hillhouse upon departure from New York on December 10, 1861)
- Nickname: Jefferson Guard
- Equipment: Model 1842 Springfield Muskets (.69 caliber, smoothbore)
- Engagements: American Civil War

Commanders
- Colonel: Karl Schwarzwälder

The 5th New York State Militia (after 1862 5th New York State National Guard, also known as the Jefferson Guard) was a New York State militia, organized in 1861 in New York City, under Colonel C. Schwarzwaelder, Lieutenant Colonel Louis Burger and Major George Van Amsberg. The regiment's primary language was German. It offered its services to the state on 16 April 1861. Although the regiment was originally organized as artillery, it was assigned to the infantry.

The Jefferson Guards saw three months service and were mustered out on 7 August 1861. The regiment was reconstituted under Colonel Louis Burger in June 1863, and saw another month's service primarily on guard duty.

== 1861 service ==
This regiment in the New York State Militia (NYSM) was located in New York city. It was composed of German citizens with the following field officers: Colonel Karl Schwarzwälder, Lieutenant Colonel Louis Burger, and Major George Van Amsberg. The Fifth Regiment was originally organized in the city of New York as artillery, but was changed to infantry and assigned in the Militia organization to the 2nd Brigade, 1st Division, NYSM.

Special Orders No. 60, of Saturday, April 20, directed MGEN Sandford, commander of 1st Division MYSM, to detail two regiments in addition to the 6th, 7th, 12th and 71st for immediate service, to report forthwith to the President at Washington. Hearing of this order, the 5th's commander, COL C. Schwarzwälder, offered his service to Governor Edwin D. Morgan Friday, April 19, 1861. In response to his offer, Special Orders No. 103, arrived on Sunday, April 28, adding the 5th to Sandford's four regiments. It also ordered Sandford to provide for their immediate transportation to Washington, DC, to report for federal service, and for the issue to them of one month's supplies.

Before leaving the State, Colonel Van Buren, the Paymaster General, paid over to the regiment on State account, $3,509.40. The regiment was ordered to sail for Fort Monroe on Saturday, April 27. On Monday, it departed Manhattan on board the steam transport SS Kedar, for Annapolis, Maryland instead. It kept communications from Washington to Annapolis, MD by taking up guard duty along the railroad from the state capital to Annapolis Junction until May 12. (Note: This was the Annapolis and Elk Ridge Railroad (A&E). Annapolis Junction was established as a rail junction on the north-south mainline of the Baltimore and Ohio Railroad (B&O) when the tracks of the A&E railroad terminated there in 1840. Since this provided a rail route to Annapolis from Washington and Baltimore via the B&O, it was, therefore, a junction to Annapolis.) That day, Sunday, it moved to Washington and quartered in the United States Capitol till May 23. On Thursday, May 16, it mustered in for three months' federal service.

For most of May, a large portion of the remaining three months' service was rendered, particularly at what is termed the "Relay House," where they were employed upon guard, picket and scout duty. Their vigilance was noted as frequently preventing serious results to the body of troops stationed at that post. Their duty along the railroad, which was a special object of their care, thwarted attempts to place obstacles upon the tracks to sabotage the arrival of federal volunteers to Washington. In this respect, their services were most valuable, for a large minority of the population of Maryland were inclined to support the Rebellion, so that it was necessary to exercise the greatest caution in guarding the lines of communication with the Capital.

On 24 May 1861, the regiment took part in the occupation of Arlington Heights, occupying Camp Union, one mile east of Ball's Crossroads. It remained there on guard and picket duty through June 3 during which time a company of the 2nd New York Militia was transferred to it as Company K, on 28 May 1861.

It returned to Washington an into camp on Meridian Hill until July 7 when it moved to Baltimore, thence to Hagerstown. On the 9th of July, the 5th crossed the Potomac at Williamsport, and advanced to the B&O railroad works at Martinsburg. (Note: Martinsburg, then part of Virginia was a railroad maintenance center. In part due to the B&O being the largest employer in town and a substantial Quaker minority, it was staunchly Unionist. As following U.S. troops learned, the local black population, enslaved and free, was a valuable source for intelligence on rebel activity in the area as well as who and where the local Unionists were. Martinsburg had such an overwhelming majority of Unionists that it led the Rebels to call it "Little Massachusetts".)

At Martinsburg, it joined the 12th New York State Militia and the 19th and 28th New York Volunteer Infantry as the 8th Brigade under COLButterfield, in MGEN Sandford's 3rd Division, (Note: Their division commander in the New York Militia.) in MGEN Patterson's Army. Patterson's troops had already met Jackson at the Battle of Hoke's Run on July 2. (Note: On that day, Patterson crossed the Potomac River near Williamsport, Maryland, and marched on the main road toward Martinsburg, Virginia. Near Hoke's Run, Union forces engaged Colonel Thomas J. Jackson's forces and slowly drove them back toward Winchester. The encounter was very brief, and three regiments reported casualties: 1st Wisconsin Infantry, 11th Pennsylvania Infantry, and 15th Pennsylvania Infantry.) With them, it advanced to Bunker's Mill, Monday, July 15.

Two days later, it moved to Charlestown. At the time of the battle of Bull Run, on Sunday, July 21, it had moved to reinforce the garrison at Harper's Ferry and took station on Bolivar Heights. A week later, on Sunday morning, the regiment and the brigade moved to Knoxville. On Tuesday, July 30, it moved to Baltimore, where it entrained for return home, arriving there, Friday, August 2. The 5th mustered out of federal service in New York City, Wednesday, August 7, 1861.

Despite being no longer being in existence, orders were issued on 27 May 1862 directing the regiment to proceed to Washington, D. C., for another three months' service; the mistake was caught and the orders revoked the following week. Efforts to reconstitute the regiment failed until June 1863.

== 1863 service ==
In June 1863, in response to President Lincoln's call for volunteers, the regiment, now known as the "5th New York State National Guard", was reconstituted into federal service under now Colonel Louis Burger, and on the 18th was ordered to guard duty in Harrisburg, Pennsylvania. It was attached to Yates' 1st Brigade, Dana's Division, Department of the Susquehanna. Over the next month they served as guards in Harrisburg, Marysville, Carlisle and Chambersburg. They did not fight at Gettysburg.

After the Battle of Gettysburg, the regiment was mustered out of the United States service at New York city on 22 July 1863.

== Notable members ==
- Albert Steinway – son of Heinrich Engelhard Steinweg (later known as Henry E. Steinway) founder of Steinway

== See also ==
- List of New York Civil War regiments
