= Middle Military Division =

Union military group

The Middle Military Division was an organization of the Union Army during the American Civil War, responsible for operations around the Shenandoah Valley of Virginia and the Valley Campaigns of 1864.

In the summer of 1864, Confederate General Jubal Early's army had defeated several Union armies, had advanced close to Washington, D.C., and continued to operate in the Shenandoah Valley into August. Faced with this continued threat, the Union high command created the Middle Military Division and ordered the cavalry commander of the Army of the Potomac, Major General Phillip Sheridan, to command it. The Military Division (an entity that controlled multiple military departments within the Union Army) was established on August 7, 1864. It comprised the geographic and military assets of the Departments of the Susquehanna, Washington, West Virginia, and the Middle Department. On December 1, 1864, the Department of the Susquehanna within the military division changed its name to the Department of Pennsylvania.

The operational field forces of the division were collectively known as the Army of the Shenandoah. Philip Sheridan commanded both the military division and the army from August 7 to October 18, 1864.

== Command history ==
Commander	From	To
Major General Philip Sheridan (temporary)	August 7, 1864	September 21, 1864
Major General Philip Sheridan	September 21, 1864	February 27, 1865
Major General Winfield S. Hancock	February 27, 1865	June 27, 1865

When Hancock was assigned to the military division, his command did not include the troops under the command of Sheridan. Hancock relieved Sheridan of troop command on May 17, 1865.

== See also ==
- Union Army (explanation of military division, department, and army organizations)
