= 2nd Pennsylvania Infantry Regiment =

Union Army infantry regiment

- Active: April 20 – July 26, 1861
- Country: United States
- Allegiance: Union
- Branch: Union Army
- Type: Infantry
- Part of: Department of Pennsylvania
- Engagements: American Civil War: Battle of Hoke's Run

Commanders
- Notable commanders: Frederick Stumbaugh

The 2nd Pennsylvania Infantry Regiment was a Union army regiment that participated in the early part the American Civil War.

== Recruitment ==
- Company A: Franklin County
- Company B: Franklin County
- Company C: Franklin County
- Company D: Perry County
- Company E: Adams County
- Company F: Lancaster County
- Company G: Chester County
- Company H: Centre County
- Company I: Dauphin County
- Company K: York County

== History ==
In the wake of the Battle of Fort Sumter and President Abraham Lincoln's subsequent call for 75,000 volunteers in the spring of 1861, the Commonwealth of Pennsylvania began organizing regiments for ninety days' service in the Union Army. As companies of volunteers and militiamen began arriving in the state capital at Harrisburg, the men were gathered north of the city at Camp Curtin. On April 20, 1861, ten companies of volunteers were organized into a regiment and dubbed the 2nd Pennsylvania Infantry. Most of the recruits came from central and south-central Pennsylvania. The next day they were sent to Washington but their train was halted near Cockeysville, Maryland because Secessionists had burned a railroad bridge as part of the Baltimore Riot. The regiment bivouacked in a field near the train for two days, worrying about further violence by the Secessionists. After the threat passed the regiment was sent to York, Pennsylvania arriving on April 24. They spent the next month drilling and training.

On June 1, the 2nd Pennsylvania was sent to Chambersburg where it was placed in General George Wynkoop's second brigade of General William Keim's division in the Department of Pennsylvania commanded by General Robert Patterson. Within a few days a force of over 8,000 men was gathered around Chambersburg, mostly Pennsylvania and New York three-month regiments. Patterson's army was tasked with advancing into the Shenandoah Valley, engaging with General Joseph E. Johnston's Confederate army stationed there, and preventing them from reinforcing Beauregard's army defending Manassas Junction, Virginia. On June 16 the 2nd Pennsylvania advanced from Chambersburg to Hagerstown, Maryland and then to Funkstown, where they remained until late June.

Patterson's army crossed the Potomac River on July 2 at Falling Waters and advanced toward Martinsburg, Virginia. Just north of Martinsburg they encountered a brigade of Virginians commanded by Brigadier General Thomas J. Jackson. What resulted was a skirmish known as the Battle of Hoke's Run. The 2nd Pennsylvania did not take part in the skirmish, but were in close supporting distance and arrived on the battlefield shortly after Jackson retreated. From July 3 to July 15 the 2nd Pennsylvania took part in the occupation of Martinsburg. Then they joined with the rest of the army on an advance on Bunker Hill. General Patterson had, by this time, lost his nerve and was worried that he faced a much larger Confederate force. He pulled his army back to Charlestown where they entrenched and waiting for, what Patterson believed, the impending Confederate attack. Patterson had been entirely fooled by Johnston, who transferred the bulk of his army from the Shenandoah Valley to Manassas Junction where they played a decisive part in the Confederate victory at the Battle of Bull Run. General Patterson retreated to Harpers Ferry, Virginia and the next day was relieved of command.

The end of their three-months service having expired, the 2nd Pennsylvania was sent back to Harrisburg by train and mustered out of service on July 26, 1861.

== Casualties ==
Two men died of disease.

== See also ==
- List of Pennsylvania Civil War Units

== Sources ==
- Dyer, Frederick H. (1959). A Compendium of the War of the Rebellion. Sagamore Press Inc. Thomas Yoseloff, Publisher, New York, New York. LCCN 59-12963.
