= William Farrar Smith =

United States Army officer

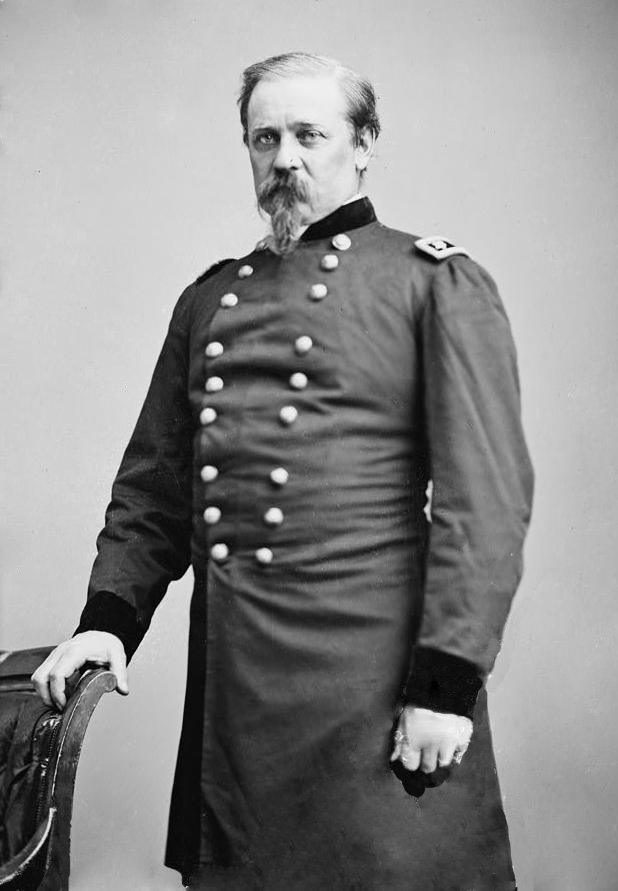
- William Farrar "Baldy" Smith
- Born: February 17, 1824; St. Albans, Vermont, US
- Died: February 28, 1903 (aged 79); Philadelphia, Pennsylvania, US
- Burial place: Arlington National Cemetery
- Military career
- Allegiance: United States (Union)
- Branch: United States Army; Union Army
- Service years: 1845–1867
- Rank: Major General
- Commands: VI Corps; IX Corps; XVIII Corps
- Conflicts: American Civil War; Bull Run campaign; 1st Battle of Bull Run; Peninsula campaign; Battle of Yorktown; Battle of Williamsburg; Battle of Seven Pines; Seven Days Battles; Battle of Savage's Station; Battle of White Oak Swamp; Battle of Glendale; Battle of Malvern Hill; Maryland campaign; Battle of South Mountain; Battle of Antietam; Battle of Fredericksburg; Gettysburg campaign; Battle of Carlisle; Chattanooga campaign; Battle of Brown's Ferry; Battle of Missionary Ridge; Overland Campaign; Battle of Cold Harbor; Second Battle of Petersburg

William Farrar Smith (February 17, 1824 – February 28, 1903), known as "Baldy" Smith, was a Union general in the American Civil War, notable for attracting the extremes of glory and blame. He was praised for his gallantry in the Seven Days Battles and the Battle of Antietam, but was demoted for professional and political reasons after the disastrous defeat at the Battle of Fredericksburg. As chief engineer of the Army of the Cumberland, he achieved recognition by restoring a supply line that saved that army from starvation and surrender, known as the "Cracker Line", that helped Union troops to success in the Chattanooga campaign in the autumn of 1863. Leading the first operation against Petersburg, Smith's caution, possibly illness-related, may have cost the Union a prime opportunity for a quick end to the war. He was relieved of command shortly thereafter.

== Early life ==
Smith, known to his friends as "Baldy", was born at St. Albans, Vermont, the son of Ashbel and Sarah Butler Smith, and a cousin of J. Gregory Smith (governor of Vermont, 1863–1865). He was educated locally in Vermont until he attended the United States Military Academy at West Point in 1841, and graduated four years later standing fourth of 41 cadets. Smith was appointed a brevet second lieutenant on July 1, 1845, and was assigned to the Topographical Engineers Corps. He was promoted to second lieutenant on July 14, 1849, and promoted to first lieutenant on March 3, 1853.

During his service in the Corps, Smith conducted surveys of the Great Lakes, the states of Texas, Arizona, and Florida, as well as much of Mexico. While serving in Florida, Smith was stricken with the infectious disease malaria. Although he would recover at the time, the illness affected his physical health for the rest of his life. In 1856 Smith began his involvement in the lighthouse service, which was headquartered in Detroit, Michigan, and eventually rose to become the Engineer Secretary of the Lighthouse Board.

Smith was also twice assistant professor of mathematics at West Point (1846–48 and 1855–56). He was promoted to captain on July 1, 1859.

== Civil War ==
Smith was commissioned the colonel of the Third Vermont on July 23, 1861, but dated from April 27, making him the ranking officer of Vermont troops. On August 13, 1861, he was appointed a brigadier general in the Union Army after helping organize the 1st Vermont Brigade. He was appointed a brevet lieutenant colonel in the regular army for his gallantry at the Battle of White Oak Swamp in the Seven Days Battles. On July 4, 1862, he received promotion to the rank of major general in the Union Army. Smith led his division with conspicuous valor during the Battle of Antietam, and was again brevetted in the regular army. When his corps commander, Maj. Gen. William B. Franklin, was reassigned to a superior command, Smith was placed at the head of the VI Corps of the Army of the Potomac, which he led at the disastrous Battle of Fredericksburg.

The recriminations that followed Fredericksburg led to a famous general order in which army commander Maj. Gen. Ambrose Burnside proposed to dismiss several of the senior officers of the army. President Abraham Lincoln prevented this order from taking effect and relieved Burnside of his command instead. Smith was one of the affected officers, but it is to his credit that he did not leave the Army. However, his indiscretion in communicating to Lincoln directly about Burnside's shortcomings, compounded by the fact that Smith was a close friend of out-of-favor Maj. Gen. George B. McClellan, resulted in his losing both his corps command and his rank; the Senate failed to confirm his nomination to major general, which expired on March 4, 1863. Reverting to the rank of brigadier general, he commanded a division-sized force of militia within the Department of the Susquehanna in Pennsylvania during the critical days of the Gettysburg campaign, repelling Maj. Gen. J.E.B. Stuart at a skirmish in Carlisle. Smith's green troops then participated in the unsuccessful pursuit of Gen. Robert E. Lee back to the Potomac River. He followed this in division command in West Virginia.

On October 3, 1863, Smith was assigned to duty as chief engineer of the Army of the Cumberland (and a couple of weeks later, the Military Division of the Mississippi). As such he conducted the engineer operations and launched the Battle of Brown's Ferry, which opened the "Cracker Line" to provide supplies and reinforcements to the besieged troops in Chattanooga. Of this action the House Committee on Military Affairs reported in 1865 that "as a subordinate, General WF Smith had saved the Army of the Cumberland from capture, and afterwards directed it to victory." Smith was then renominated for the rank of major general of volunteers. Ulysses S. Grant, who was much impressed with Smith's work, insisted strongly that the nomination should be confirmed, which was accordingly done by the Senate on March 9, 1864. Grant, according to his own statement "was not long in finding out that the objections to Smith's promotion were well grounded," but he never said what the grounds were, while Smith, contributing to a major series of war memoirs, maintained that they were purely of a personal character.

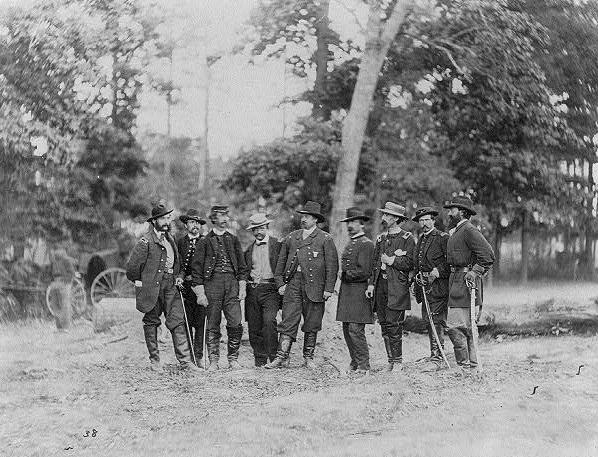
General William Farrar Smith and staff

For the Overland Campaign of 1864, Smith was assigned by Grant to command the XVIII Corps in Maj. Gen. Benjamin Butler's Army of the James, which he led in the Battle of Cold Harbor and the first operations against Petersburg. Smith's corps and a division of black troops (under Edward W. Hinks) were ordered to take the city. Remembering the debacle at Cold Harbor, Smith performed exhaustive reconnaissance. Determining that the section of the defensive line was manned primarily by artillery, he ordered an attack. The attack was successful in capturing several Confederate batteries and over a mile of entrenchments. However, by the time this was accomplished, Smith determined that darkness prevented him from effectively moving further. Both the time it took to prepare for the attack and suspending the attack at night has led some historians to see the outcome of the battle as a missed opportunity to shorten the war by nearly a year. But the fault may also lay with General Grant who failed to communicate with Smith, Major General George Gordon Meade and Major General Winfield Scott Hancock the full picture of the battle's true objective and provide the time to develop an effective operational plan. Smith's personal and professional differences with Generals Butler and Meade led General Grant to relieve Smith from command of the XVIII Corps on July 19, 1864. Smith spent the remainder of the war serving on military commissions, including one that discovered significant corruption in the Department of the Gulf.

== Postbellum career ==
Smith resigned from the volunteer service in 1865, and from the U.S. Army in 1867. From 1864 to 1873 he was president of the International Telegraph Company, and from 1875 to 1881 served on the board of police commissioners of New York City, becoming its president in 1877. After 1881 he was engaged in civil engineering work in Pennsylvania. He died at Philadelphia in 1903 and is buried in Arlington National Cemetery. His Autobiography of Major General William F. Smith, 1861–1864 was published posthumously in 1990.

== See also ==
- List of American Civil War generals (Union)
