= 20th Pennsylvania Infantry Regiment =

Union Army volunteer infantry regiment

20th Pennsylvania Volunteer Infantry
- Pennsylvania flag
- Active: April 30, 1861 – August 6, 1861
- Country: United States
- Allegiance: Union
- Branch: United States Army; Union Army
- Type: Infantry
- Part of: 3rd Brigade, First Division, Army of the Shenandoah
- Nickname: Scott Legion
- Engagements: American Civil War

Commanders
- Notable commanders: Col. William H. Gray

The 20th Pennsylvania Volunteer Infantry (Scott Legion) was a volunteer infantry regiment in the Union Army during the American Civil War. One of the Keystone State's three-month service regiments, this unit's tour of duty took its members from Philadelphia to South Central Pennsylvania and then southeast to Maryland and Virginia (into Martinsburg and other areas that are now part of West Virginia).

== History ==
Formed during a meeting on Thursday, April 25, 1861, by members of the "Scott Legion," a group of soldiers who had served under General Winfield Scott during the Mexican–American War, the 20th Pennsylvania Volunteer Infantry was led by William H. Gray, a 46-year-old resident of Philadelphia, who had been appointed as commanding officer of the regiment and awarded the rank of colonel at this same meeting, Gray then began his recruitment efforts the next day at multiple recruiting locations in Philadelphia. By Saturday of that same week, his ranks were full and, by the next week, were overflowing as an additional 600 men volunteered.

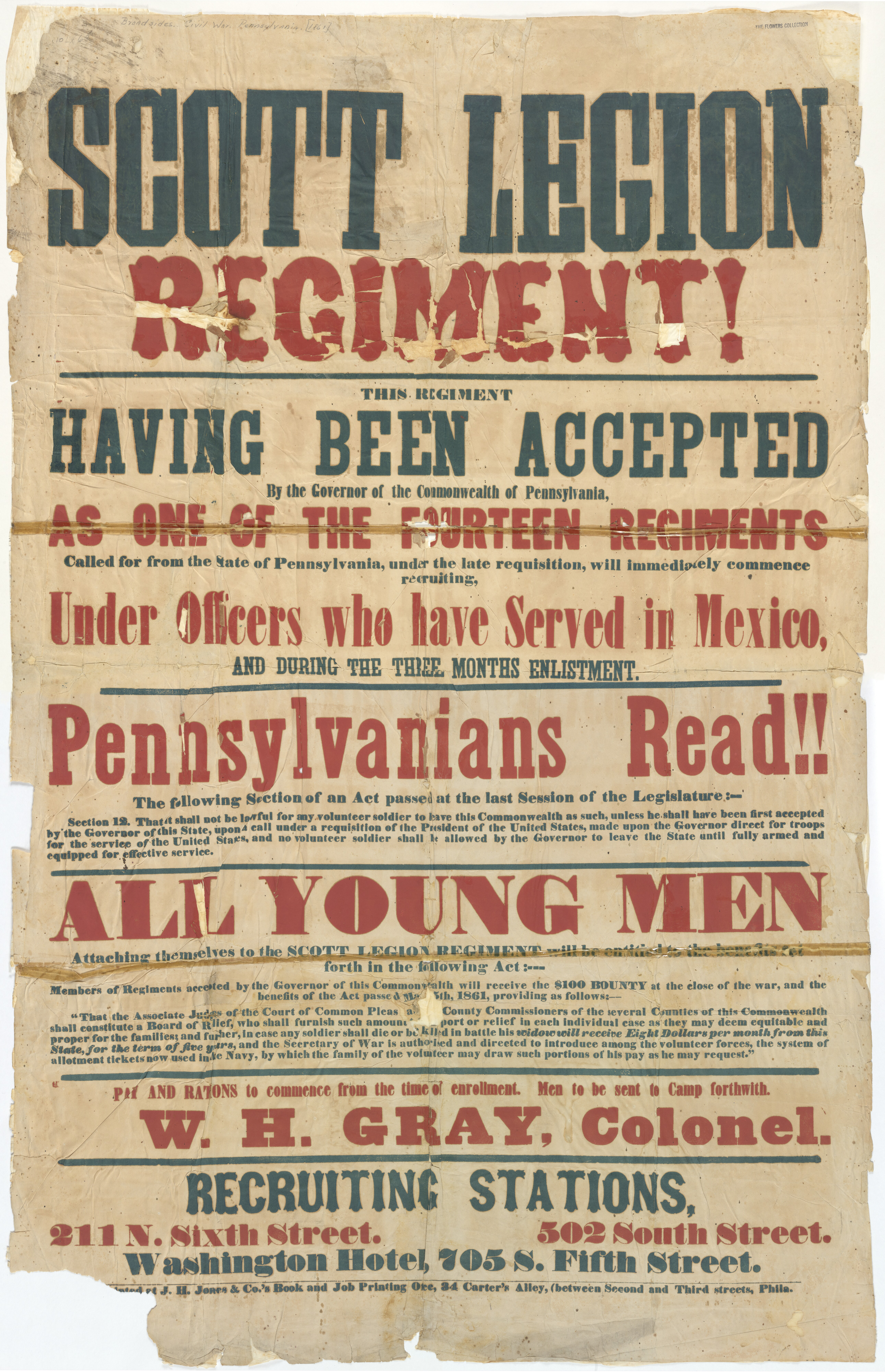
Recruitment flyer used by the 20th Pennsylvania Volunteers (also known as the Scott Legion), Philadelphia, 1861.

Mustering in at Philadelphia on April 30, the newly enlisted men then elected the following as Field and Staff Officers on May 7: George Moore, lieutenant colonel; Andrew H. Tippin, major; Edwin R. Biles, adjutant; Charles A. Jones, quartermaster; A. B. Campbell, surgeon; Samuel H. Horner, assistant surgeon; and William Fulton, chaplain. According to Bates, "Of the thirty-seven [company and field] officers chosen, nearly all were elected unanimously, and thirty-one of this number were members of [the Scott Legion."

The most senior officers for each company of the regiment were:

- Company A: A. S. Tourison, captain; Enoch Thomas, first lieutenant; William J. Mackey, second lieutenant; William H. Tourison, first sergeant;
- Company B: Edward E. Wallace, captain; Lafayette Thomas, first lieutenant; Isaac Williams, second lieutenant; William H. Forbes, first sergeant;
- Company C: John Spear, captain; Thomas G. Funston, first lieutenant; Edward L. Poalk, second lieutenant; John B. Buck, first sergeant;
- Company D: Anthony H. Reynolds, captain; Alexander Lorilliard, first lieutenant; Charles J. Bates, second lieutenant; Francis H. Casey, first sergeant;
- Company E: Thomas Hawksworth, captain; William Stiff, first lieutenant; James A. Sawyer, second lieutenant; Robert Pollard, first sergeant;
- Company F: John P. Carie, captain; Milton S. Davis, first lieutenant; Garrett B. Culin, second lieutenant; T. Vincent Bonsald, first sergeant;
- Company G: Hiram B. Yeager, captain; Theodore B. Dunham, first lieutenant; Cephas M. Hodgson, second lieutenant; Lewis Passmore, first sergeant;
- Company H: James Crosson, captain; Robert Winslow, first lieutenant; John Arrison, first lieutenant; Alfred Moylan, second lieutenant; Charles W. Myers, first sergeant;
- Company I: George W. Todd, captain; Edward Y. Buchanan, first lieutenant; Richard M. Jones, second lieutenant; James B. Venai, first sergeant;
- Company K: William H. Sickels, captain; Jediah Rumble, first lieutenant; George W. Gampher, second lieutenant; and Anthony W. Thompson, first lieutenant.

Per a notice from the Scott Legion, which was published in the Columbia Democrat in Bloomsburg, Pennsylvania in June, 1861 after having first appeared in The Philadelphia Inquirer:

The Scott Legion of this city [Philadelphia] have formed one regiment, now in service for three years, and have a second regiment ready to be sworn in at any time. The officers of these regiments are members of the old Scott legion, who served so effectively during the Mexican war. The Captains and Lieutenants are all above thirty, or twenty-two years of age....

Initially stationed at the Post Office in Philadelphia, the 20th Pennsylvania Volunteers were "clothed in the old United States blue jacket and pants," according to Bates, equipped with rifled muskets, and given basic training in both Scott's and Hardee's infantry tactics. Honing their marching skills during a series of dress parades, they also engaged in periodic battalion drills at the State House yard before the regiment was moved to Suffolk Park, six miles outside of Philadelphia. Stationed there for two weeks, during which the men received additional arms training, the regiment was then ordered to Chambersburg, Pennsylvania, where it was attached to Major General Robert Patterson's army as part of the 3rd Brigade, First Division.

The Bedford Inquirer then reported on the regiment's presence at Chambersburg on June 2:

Chambersburg, June 2.– General Patterson and his staff reached here this morning, Captain McMullin's Rangers met with enthusiastic greeting at every station along the road from Harrisburg. The Rangers are quartered in the woods near the First City Troop. The latter are in fine health and spirits. The Scott Legion, encamped three miles south of the town, bear their fatigue well....

Ordered to move out with their brigade on June 8, the 20th Pennsylvania Volunteers made camp at Greencastle, Pennsylvania before moving again to sites in Maryland near the St. James School (Hagerstown) and Williamsport. On July 2, they moved out with the entire Army of the Shenandoah, making their way to Martinsburg and Bunker Hill, Virginia, where they were assigned to protect the army's main column as it moved on to Charlestown in an attempt to pin down General Joseph E. Johnston's Confederate forces. Continuing their forward movement, the 20th Pennsylvania then joined with other Union troops from the Army of the Shenandoah to seize and occupy Keyes' Ford.

On July 24, the regiment was ordered back to Philadelphia, where it was mustered out August 6, having honorably completed its three months' service.

== Casualties ==
According to rosters for the 20th Pennsylvania, which are maintained online by the Pennsylvania State Archives, only one member of the regiment was reported as a casualty – Pvt. Thomas H. Ford of Company D, who was honorably discharged on a surgeon's certificate of disability. Based on these same records, no other casualties were incurred by the regiment during its three-month tenure of service.

== Gallery ==
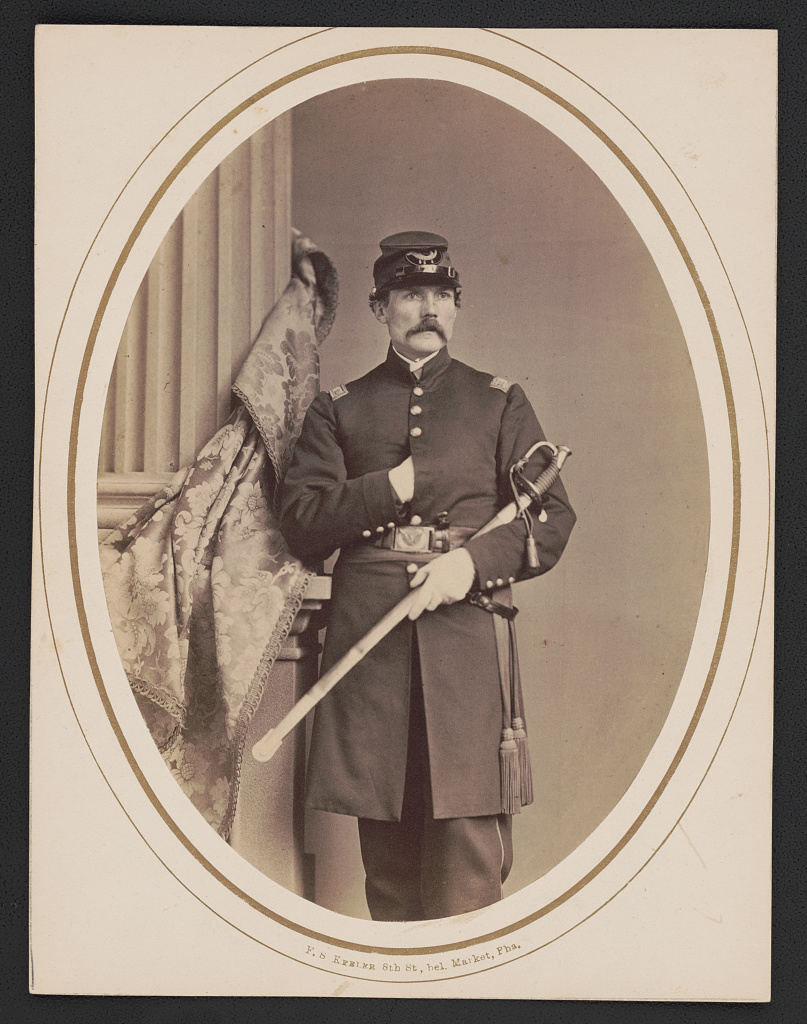
Capt. John P. Carie

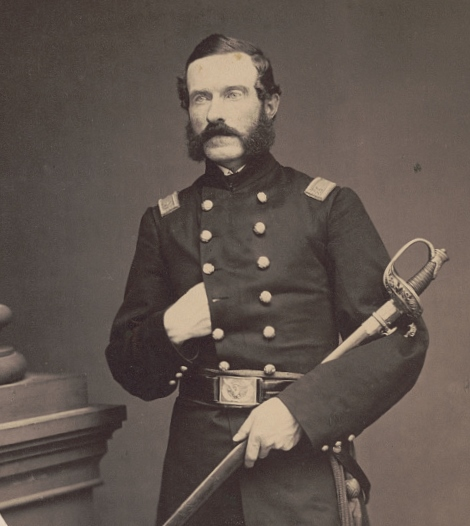
Capt. George W. Todd (shown as Lt. Col., 91st Pennsylvania)

== See also ==
- List of Pennsylvania Civil War Units
