= Battle of Carlisle =

Battle of the American Civil War

- Part of Gettysburg campaign
Date	July 1, 1863
Location	Carlisle, Pennsylvania 40.2011°N 77.1845°W
Result	Inconclusive

Belligerents
(United States) USA (Union)	(Confederate States of America) CSA (Confederacy)

Commanders and leaders
William F. Smith	Maj. Gen. J.E.B. Stuart

Strength
PA & NY state militia (~1,000 men)	3 cavalry brigades, e.g.: Maj. Gen. Fitzhugh Lee's brigade

Casualties and losses
1 KIA, 12 wounded	8 casualties

The Battle of Carlisle was an American Civil War skirmish fought in Pennsylvania on July 1, 1863, which was also the first day of the Battle of Gettysburg. Major General J.E.B. Stuart's Confederate cavalry briefly engaged Union militia under Major General William F. "Baldy" Smith at Carlisle and set fire to the Carlisle Barracks. Stuart's cavalry withdrew and arrived at Gettysburg on the second day of the battle, to the perplexity and annoyance of General Robert E. Lee.

== Background ==
Carlisle was settled in 1751, and the Carlisle Barracks military post was established nearby in 1757, during the French and Indian War. The United States Army Cavalry School was established at the post in 1838.

Captain Stoneman's four companies had a Civil War encampment at Horner's Mill on May 6, 1861. By June 1863 the barracks' cavalry had been "withdrawn to Harrisburg".

On June 27, 1863, Confederate Lieutenant General Richard S. Ewell's Second Corps of the Army of Northern Virginia stopped at Carlisle en route to Harrisburg and looted supplies and food from the populace. Ewell, as well as some of his officers, had been stationed at the Carlisle Barracks prior to the Civil War when they were still members of the United States Army. He paused in Carlisle while sending his cavalry under Brigadier General Albert G. Jenkins towards the Susquehanna River and Harrisburg. After resting much of his infantry overnight, Ewell moved northward in his quest to seize the state capital.

After the Confederates left in response to an order from Lee to concentrate near Gettysburg, Carlisle was liberated by Baldy Smith and a small contingent of New York and Pennsylvania militia from the Department of the Susquehanna, dispatched by the department commander, Maj. Gen. Darius N. Couch. The 32nd and 33rd Pennsylvania Volunteer Militia, Landis's Philadelphia militia artillery battery, and a company of the 1st New York Cavalry formed Smith's force.

== Stuart's raid ==
During the early evening of July 1, Stuart led two brigades of cavalry, which had just completed a raid in Maryland and Pennsylvania, to Carlisle. Their mission was to search for supplies and try to determine the location of Ewell's troops. A third brigade, under Wade Hampton, remained behind in York County to guard a train of 125 captured Federal supply wagons. Instead of finding Ewell, Stuart encountered Smith's militiamen. Despite having a large numerical advantage, Stuart's troopers were too exhausted from a month of campaigning to attack the town outright.

After learning that Smith's men were only militia, Stuart sent Maj. Gen. Fitzhugh Lee into Carlisle with a white flag, telling Smith to either evacuate the town or clear out the women and children. Smith replied that he had already done the latter, and refused to surrender. Stuart's horse artillery under Captain James Breathed then began bombarding the town. After shelling Carlisle for several hours, Stuart received word that fighting had broken out to the southwest at Gettysburg between the main armies. Unable to take the town by force, Stuart disengaged, having ordered his troops to set fire to the Carlisle Barracks. Stuart's troops started moving towards the fighting at Gettysburg at approximately 1:00 am on July 2, 1863.

In addition to minimal Union and Confederate casualties, a lumber yard and the town gas works were destroyed after being set ablaze. However, Stuart's delay at Carlisle impacted his ability to rendezvous with Lee's main army.
