= Charles W. Sandford =

American lawyer (1796–1878)

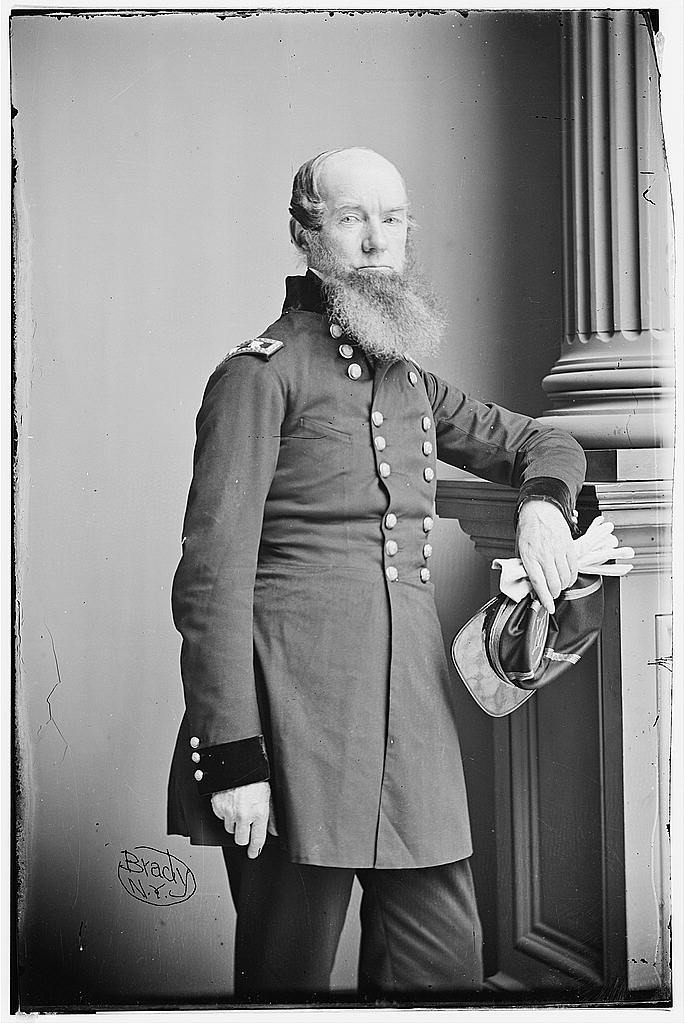
- Born: May 5, 1796; Newark, New Jersey, US
- Died: July 25, 1878 (aged 82); Avon Springs, New York, US
- Other name: Charles W. Sanford
- Occupations: Militia officer, lawyer and businessman
- Known for: New York militia officer who led the First Division in several major riots and civil disturbances between the 1830s to the 1860s.
- Term: Commanding officer of the New York First Division
- Predecessor: Jacob Morton
- Successor: Alexander Shaler
- Children: 2 sons, 4 daughters
- Parent: William B. Sandford

Charles W. Sandford (May 5, 1796 – July 25, 1878) was an American militia and artillery officer, lawyer and businessman. He was a senior officer in the New York State Militia for over thirty years and commanded the First Division in every major civil disturbance in New York City up until the American Civil War, most notably, the New York Draft Riots in 1863.

== Biography ==
Charles W. Sandford was born in Newark, New Jersey, to William B. Sandford, a farmer and veteran of the American Revolutionary War, on May 5, 1796. He pursued a career in law, studying under Ogden Hoffman, and enlisted as a private in the New York State Artillery. Assigned to the Third Regiment, he remained with the unit as it became the Eighth Regiment popularly known as the "Washington Grays". Rising up the ranks as a non-commissioned officer, he commanded Company F and was subsequently promoted to lieutenant colonel and to full colonel. In 1834, he was elected brigadier general of the Sixth Brigade Artillery.

On May 10, 1839, Sandford was commissioned major general of the First Division and held command for nearly three decades. Although having a fine service record, Sandford kept an informal atmosphere and sometimes lax discipline within his command. Units were also far below regimental quotas. Brigadier generals were late reporting for duty and he himself was very late organizing division formations on occasion. This often resulted in delays such as military parades being three or four hours overdue. These officers were generally not held accountable for their negligence and courts-martial were rarely held.

Sandford was fond of military pomp and often organized celebrations and public events involving the militia. Among these included a parade honoring visiting General José Antonio Páez, the former president of Venezuela, in July 1850. His eldest son, 30-year-old Charles Sandford, accompanied Páez back to South America where he died of fever shortly afterwards. The following year, he also had the militia receive Louis Kossuth upon his arrival in the city in October 1851, his formal reception at Castle Garden in December and a third parade at his departure. On several occasions, he and his men escorted American presidents when visiting the city and paraded at the funerals of Henry Clay and Daniel Webster.

Sandford had a commendable military record leading the militia in the Flour Riot of 1837, the Astor Place Riot in 1849, the Dead Rabbits and Municipal Police Riots of 1857 and the New York Draft Riot in 1863. General Winfield Scott once said that "Sandford was one of the finest volunteer service generals that he ever knew." He commanded the Seventh Regiment and militia forces on behalf of Sheriff Westervelt and eventually confronted Mayor Fernando Wood, his forces surrounding City Hall Park, and took him into custody. That same year, he was asked by NYPD Police Commissioner Simeon Draper for his assistance during the Dead Rabbits Riot. He sent the Eight and Seventy-First Regiments, both at half strength but supported by two 75-man police detachments, which marched down White and Worth Streets and confronted the gang members driving them back to the Five Points. This action ended the rioting, but police and soldiers continued to patrol the district that night and all the next day.

His command seriously weakened due to manpower shortages during the American Civil War, Sandford served on active duty with the Union Army from April 19 to July 25, 1861. In May 1861, he was ordered by Brigadier General Joseph K. Mansfield to oversee the capture of Alexandria, Virginia, as the vast majority the Union troops were from New York. He also served under Major General Robert Patterson for three months and took part in the Battle of Hoke's Run.

Returning to New York, he was present during the New York Draft Riots in 1863 and managed to organize a small force of scattered militia regiments, military troops and home guards from his headquarters at the State Arsenal at Seventh Avenue and Thirty-Fifth Street. He was one of the senior officers who directed police and military during the riots. When receiving reports of the battle between police and rioters at the Union Steam Works, with hundreds of rioters now armed with muskets, swords and pistols, he sent Colonel H.J. O'Brien and 150 men to help police. Lieutenant Eagleson, in command of two 6-pound cannons and 25 artillerymen, accompanied O'Brien to the battle.

After the war, Sandford was relieved of his command by Governor Reuben Fenton who appointed Alexander Shaler to succeed him and officially took command on January 23, 1867. Sandford, who had been involved in the theater as early as 1847, ran the Lafayette Theatre on Sullivan Street. His success encouraged him to open a second theater in The Bowery, The Mount Pitt Theatre and Circus, but both buildings burned down within the same week ending his career in the theater. He also built a number of buildings on Canal Street although he lost these to fire as well. Sandford would often experience success and disaster in his business dealings, acquiring and then losing small fortunes two or three times, however he was able to provide his family with a comfortable competency his later years. He and his wife often entertained at their West Twenty-Second Street residence whose social functions were often attended by prominent citizens of the city. For over fifty years, he was a leading member in the old St. Paul's Episcopal Church in Broadway.

He was also an accomplished lawyer and the one-time partner of John Bristed, son of author Charles Astor Bristed. Sandford also served as counsel for the Harlem Railroad Company for twenty years and later represented the company against inventor Ross Winans. At the time of his death, he was vice president of the New York City Bar Association. In late-July 1878, Sandford left the city for his annual summer vacation to Avon Springs in Livingston County, New York. A day after his arrival however, he died suddenly on the morning of July 25, 1878. A telegram was sent announcing his passing, occurring shortly after his 82nd birthday, but the circumstances of his death were unknown to his family. His body was brought back to the city by one of his daughters and buried shortly afterwards.
