= William T. H. Brooks =

American Union Army general (1821-1870)

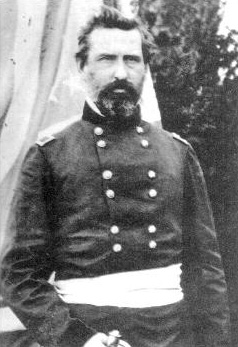
- Maj. Gen. William T. H. Brooks
- Born: January 28, 1821; New Lisbon, Ohio
- Died: July 19, 1870 (aged 49); Huntsville, Alabama
- Burial place: Maple Hill Cemetery, Huntsville, Alabama
- Military career
- Allegiance: (United States) United States; Union
- Branch: United States Army; Union Army
- Service years: 1841–1864
- Rank: Major General
- Unit: Army of the Potomac
- Commands: 2nd Brigade, 2nd Division, VI Corps; Department of the Monongahela; 1st Division/XVIII Corps
- Conflicts: Second Seminole War; Mexican War; American Civil War
- Other work: farmer

William Thomas Harbaugh Brooks (January 28, 1821 – July 19, 1870) was a career military officer in the United States Army, serving as a major general during the American Civil War.

== Early life ==
Brooks was born in New Lisbon (now Lisbon), Ohio, and was educated in public schools. He graduated from the United States Military Academy, ranking 46th out of 52 students in the Class of 1841. Appointed a second lieutenant, he served on garrison and frontier duty.

== Seminole and Mexican Wars ==
Brooks saw combat in both the Second Seminole War and the Mexican–American War. He participated in the battles of Battle of Palo Alto and the Battle of Resaca de la Palma in 1846. He saw considerable action in the Battle of Monterrey, and received a brevet to captain for "gallant and meritorious conduct." The following year, Brooks was at the Siege of Vera Cruz, the Battle of Cerro Gordo, the Skirmish of Ocalaca, the Battle of Contreras, and Battle of Churubusco. He received a brevet promotion to major, August 20, 1847, for gallant and meritorious conduct at Contreras and Churubusco. He served on the staff of Gen. David E. Twiggs for the rest of the war.

He was promoted to captain, 3rd U.S. Infantry, on November 10, 1851, then served on frontier duty in the New Mexico Territory until 1858, at times skirmishing with local Navajos. He then served at Fort Clark, Texas, until 1861, when he returned to the East for garrison duty at Fort Hamilton, New York, where he was stationed when the Southern states seceded.

=== Civil War ===
With the outbreak of the Civil War, Brooks was appointed brigadier general of volunteers in September 1861. He commanded the 2nd Brigade, 2nd Division of the IV Corps in the Peninsula Campaign, and the 2nd Brigade, 2nd Division of the VI Corps at the Seven Days Battles, where he was wounded at the Battle of Savage's Station. Recovering, he resumed command of his brigade for the Maryland Campaign and led his men at Crampton's Gap, where they captured a Confederate battle flag belonging to the 16th Virginia Infantry. At the Battle of Antietam, Brooks's brigade was mainly in reserve, although under "galling fire of both artillery and sharpshooters" for 48 hours.

Promoted to divisional command, Brooks led the 1st Division of VI Corps at Fredericksburg and Chancellorsville. In June 1863, he was promoted to major general of volunteers, but this was later revoked. This demotion has been blamed on Brooks's being involved in intrigues by VI Corps commanders against Maj. Gen. Ambrose Burnside after Fredericksburg. During the Gettysburg campaign, he commanded the Department of the Monongahela, with his headquarters in Pittsburgh. He supervised the construction of a series of earthworks to protect the city from a possible Confederate raid. Returning to field duty in the late spring of 1864, Brooks commanded the 1st Division of XVIII Corps at Cold Harbor and Petersburg. In July 1864, he was forced to resign from the Army due to poor health and returned home.

== Battle ==
=== April 29, 1863: Second Battle of Fredericksburg ===
Maj. Gen. John Sedgwick was left near Fredericksburg with the VI Corps, the I Corps, and the II Corps division of Brig. Gen. John Gibbon. Hooker's plan called for Sedgwick to demonstrate near the city in order to deceive Lee about the Union plan. The VI and II Corps seized control of several crossings on April 29, 1863 laying down pontoon bridges in the early morning hours, and the divisions of William T. H. Brooks and James S. Wadsworth crossed the river. The I Corps was ordered to reinforce the main army at Chancellorsville during the night of May 1. During the evening of May 2, 1863 Sedgwick received orders to attack Early with his remaining forces.

=== May 3, 1863: Fredericksburg and Salem Church ===
At 7 a.m. on May 3, Early was confronted with four Union divisions: Brig. Gen. John Gibbon of the II Corps had crossed the Rappahannock north of town, and three divisions of Sedgwick's VI Corps—Maj. Gen. John Newton and Brig. Gens. Albion P. Howe and William T. H. Brooks — were arrayed in line from the front of the town to Deep Run. Most of Early's combat strength was deployed to the south of town, where Federal troops had achieved their most significant successes during the December battle. Marye's Heights was defended by Barksdale's Mississippi brigade and Early ordered the Louisiana brigade of Brig. Gen. Harry T. Hays from the far right to Barksdale's left.

=== May 3, 1863: Battle of Salem Church ===
At first Sedgwick believed that he faced a single brigade of infantry, so about 3:30 p.m. he attacked the Confederate positions with only William T. H. Brooks division. Brooks succeeded in driving back McLaws's right flank but a counterattack stopped the Union attack and forced Brooks to retreat back to his original position; sunset ended the combat before any further units were involved. During the night, Lee ordered Early to attack Sedgwick's left flank in the morning, while McLaws attacked the Union right. Also during the night, Sedgwick received no further orders from Hooker other than authorization to retreat across the river if Sedgwick thought the move was necessary.

== Retirement and death ==
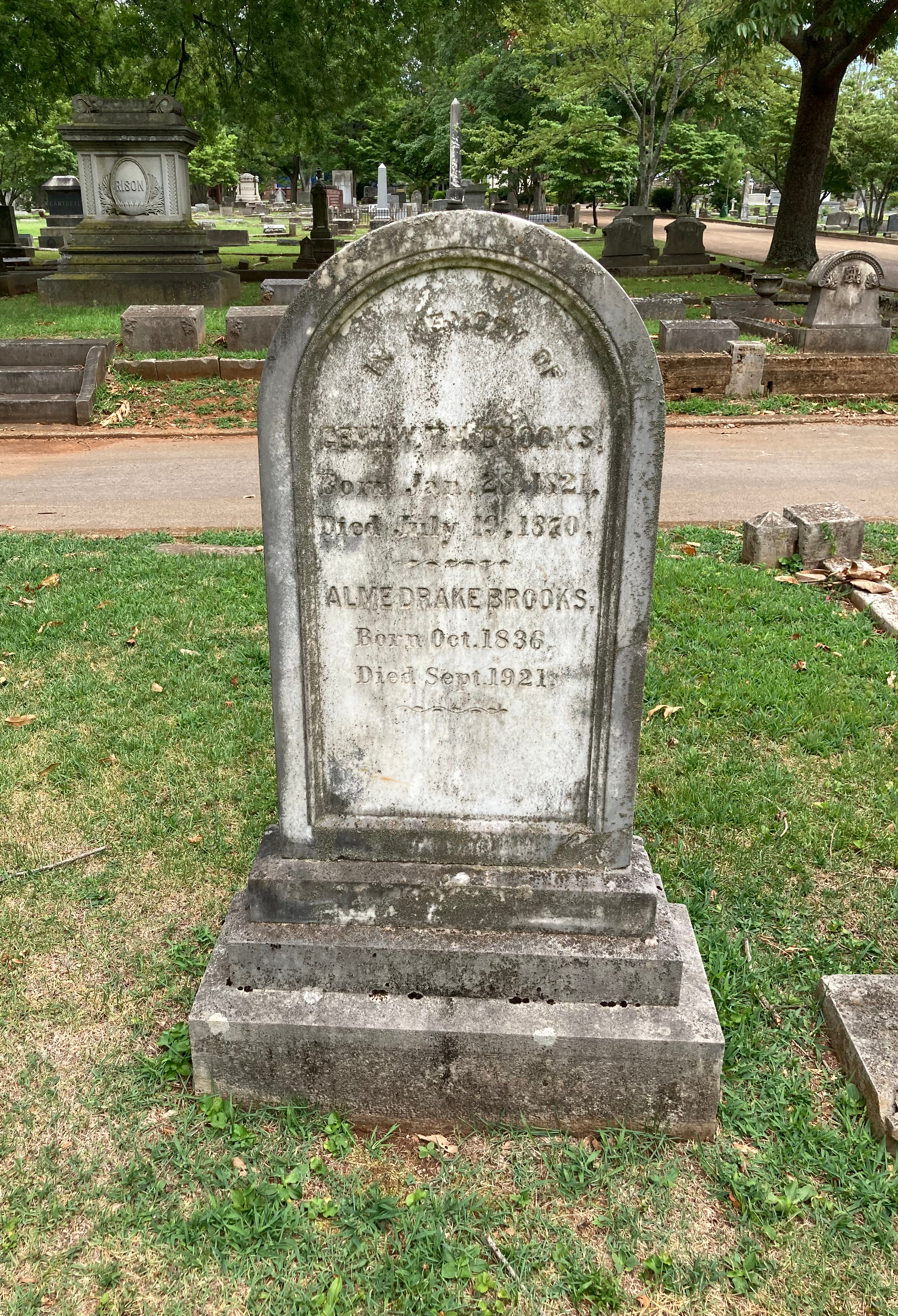
Brooks' grave at Maple Hill Cemetery

After the war, Brooks retired to Alabama and established a farm. He died in Huntsville, Alabama, and is buried there in Maple Hill Cemetery.

== See also ==
- List of American Civil War generals (Union)
