= Bull Run campaign =

Military engagements in the American Civil War

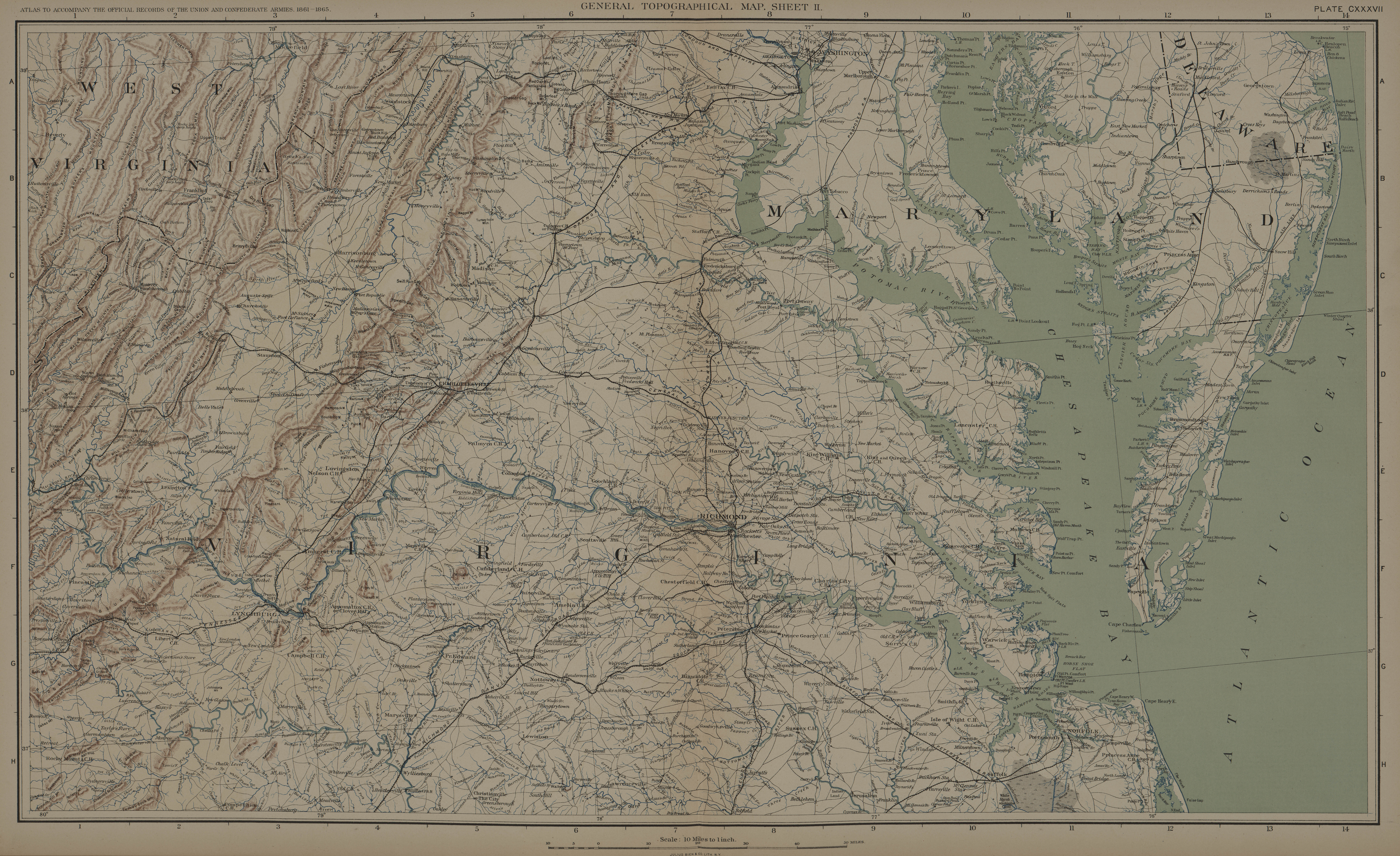
Virginia (1861)

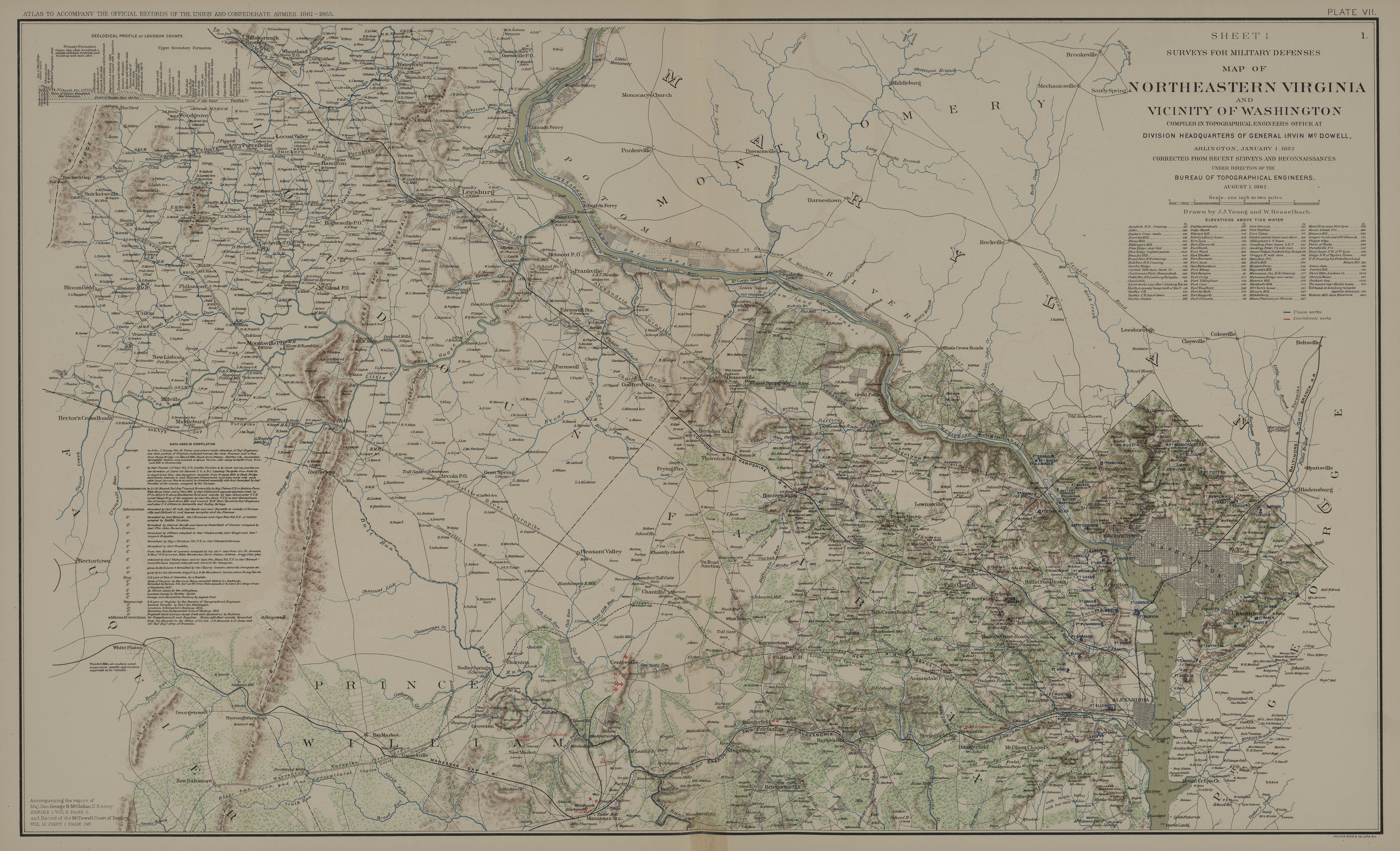
Northeastern Virginia (1861)

The Bull Run campaign, also known as the Manassas campaign, was a series of military engagements in the Eastern Theater of the American Civil War in 1861.

== Background ==
=== Military and political situation ===
The Confederate forces in northern Virginia were organized into two field armies. Brigadier General P. G. T. Beauregard was appointed commander of the Confederate Army of the Potomac in northeastern Virginia to defend the rail center of Manassas Junction; while General Joseph E. Johnston commanded the Army of the Shenandoah near Harpers Ferry in the Shenandoah Valley. The Manassas Gap Railroad connected the two forces and allowed for the quick transfer of reinforcements between the two armies. During the months of June and July, Beauregard sent Confederate President Jefferson Davis several proposals for offensive operations into Maryland, involving the various Confederate armies in Virginia, but Davis rejected them for being impractical, saying the Confederates lacked the proper resources to support any of his offensive plans.

Following the Union occupation of Alexandria, Virginia, the Union forces in Virginia were organized into the Department of Northeastern Virginia, commanded by Brigadier General Irvin McDowell, who was ordered to advance on the Confederate national capital of Richmond, Virginia. Meanwhile, Robert Patterson was assigned to command the Department of Pennsylvania and was ordered to tie down Johnston's forces in the northern Shenandoah Valley, preventing him from reinforcing Beauregard. Patterson advanced into the Valley in early June, forcing the evacuation of Harpers Ferry on June 17. Johnston retreated back to the town of Winchester, where he was reinforced by home guard units and local militia, which caused Patterson to think he was outnumbered. During this time, Patterson was having difficulty receiving supplies from Pennsylvania; also his regiments of three–month volunteers were nearing the end of their enlistments and were refusing to stay any longer. The Union general–in–chief, Brevet Lieutenant General Winfield Scott, was pressing him to send his Regular Army units to McDowell's army.

During the months of June and early July, the armies of McDowell and Beauregard engaged in several skirmishes in northeastern Virginia while the Union government and military leadership debated the proper course of action for McDowell to take. Scott favored concentrating a Union army to capture the Mississippi River valley, while McDowell viewed his army as too inexperienced to attack Beauregard yet. Due to Pressure from U.S. President Abraham Lincoln and the Union press, McDowell started his campaign against Manassas Junction on July 17. Johnston received orders the next day to start transferring his army to Manassas Junction to reinforce Beauregard; using the Manassas Gap Railroad, his army arrived on July 20 and 21. The Manassas Campaign would end in a Confederate Victory due to this inexperience. It was this early campaign that would show the North that the Confederacy was not going to be a quick rebellion.

== Battles ==
=== Hoke's Run ===
Following the Confederate abandonment of Harpers Ferry on June 15, Johnston sent Colonel Thomas J. Jackson's brigade to establish a camp near the town of Martinsburg, so to both serve as a warning of a Union advance and to delay Patterson's force. On July 2, Patterson crossed the Potomac and advanced on Jackson's position. Outnumbered and outflanked, Jackson fell back slowly, giving time for his supply train to escape before retreating to rejoin Johnston's main army.

=== Blackburn's Ford ===
McDowell's army arrived at Centreville during the morning of July 18, led by Brigadier General Daniel Tyler's division. Under orders to reconnoiter the Confederate defenses near Blackburn's Ford but not to bring on an engagement, Tyler launched an attack with Colonel Israel B. Richardson's brigade but was repulsed by the brigades of James Longstreet and Jubal Early. The battle ended with an artillery duel which lasted until dark, at which time Tyler withdrew back to Centreville.

=== First Bull Run (Manassas) ===
Following Tyler's defeat, McDowell decided to attempt an attack on the Confederate left flank. Starting about dawn on July 21, one Union division started a diversionary attack on the Stone Bridge on the Confederate left and two other divisions demonstrated against the Confederate center and right, while two other divisions marched around the Confederate left flank to launch an attack on the Confederate rear. The Union flanking column was spotted and Confederate reinforcements were rushed to Matthew's Hill but were driven back to Henry House Hill. A new Confederate defensive line, using brigades from Johnston's army, was formed along the hill, where they held against repeated Union attacks during the afternoon. A Confederate attack on the Union left flank in the late afternoon forced McDowell to retreat back to the defenses of Washington, D.C.

== Aftermath ==
Davis arrived on the Manassas battlefield soon after the battle ended. Although he attempted to organize a pursuit of the Union army, he was convinced that the Confederate armies were too disorganized to mount an effective pursuit. The dispute between Beauregard and Davis over who was responsible for the failed pursuit resulted in Beauregard's transfer to the Western Theater. In October, Johnston's and Beauregard's commands were merged into the Department of Northern Virginia, with the combined army retaining the name "Army of the Potomac".

Following First Bull Run, McDowell retreated to Centreville and set up a rearguard. At a council of war held after sunset, a majority of officers urged a retreat, which started that night. In August, the Department of Northeastern Virginia was merged with other departments in Maryland to form the Department of the Potomac, commanded by George B. McClellan. McDowell was demoted to commanding a division. Patterson was blamed for allowing Johnston to reinforce Beauregard and was also relieved of command.

== See also ==
- Troop engagements of the American Civil War, 1861
- List of costliest American Civil War land battles
- Origins of the American Civil War
- Battle of Fort Sumter
- Bull Run Mountains
- Commemoration of the American Civil War on postage stamps
