= Department of the Monongahela =

Military department in the American Civil War

The Department of the Monongahela was a military department created by the United States War Department during the Gettysburg campaign of the American Civil War.

== History ==
On June 9, 1863, President Abraham Lincoln, responding to Robert E. Lee's impending invasion of Maryland and Pennsylvania, called for 100,000 volunteers from those two states, as well as West Virginia and Ohio, to help repel the invasion, with only about 33,000 recruits answering his call. The Secretary of War, Edwin M. Stanton, ordered the creation of two departments to organize these militia and defend Pennsylvania. The Department of the Susquehanna consisted of most of central and eastern Pennsylvania. The Department of the Monongahela consisted of western Pennsylvania, including Johnstown, the Laurel Highlands, and Erie, as well as Hancock, Brooke, and Ohio counties in West Virginia, and the Ohio counties of Columbiana, Jefferson, and Belmont. The headquarters were established in Pittsburgh, under the command of Maj. Gen. William T. H. Brooks, a combat veteran of the Union Army of the Potomac.

Brooks energetically set out to defend Pittsburgh, ordering citizens and railroad crews to build an elaborate network of earthworks and fortifications along key routes of approach that any invader might use. He organized home guard units, and sent out scouts looking for signs of Confederate activity. He established communications linkages with Maj. Gen. Ambrose Burnside, commanding the adjacent Department of the Ohio, as well as the Department of the Susquehanna's Maj. Gen. Darius N. Couch. Pennsylvania Governor Andrew Curtin sent 10,000 rifles, ammunition, and supplies to Pittsburgh, and Federal troops were hastily diverted to assist in the defense of the river town should it be threatened.

Brooks's fears over a Confederate attack on Pittsburgh would prove unfounded, although Morgan's Raid through southern Ohio caused concern, as did John D. Imboden's raid on the Baltimore and Ohio Railroad between Martinsburg, West Virginia, and Cumberland, Maryland, well southeast of Pittsburgh. Satisfied that Pittsburgh was safe with the repulse of Robert E. Lee at the Battle of Gettysburg and the capture of John Hunt Morgan following the Battle of Salineville, Brooks sent home the volunteers and militia, and the forts were abandoned.

The department was merged into the Department of the Susquehanna on April 6, 1864. General Brooks returned to active field command, leading a division in the XVIII Corps in the Army of the James.

== Sources ==
- Boatner, Mark M. III (1988). The Civil War Dictionary (Revised ed.). New York: David McKay. ISBN 978-0-8129-1726-0.
- Bates, Samuel P., Martial Deeds of Pennsylvania. Philadelphia: T. H. Davis & Co., 1876.
