= Army of the Shenandoah (Union) =

- Active: July 25, 1861 – March 18, 1862; August 1, 1864 – June 27, 1865
- Country: United States
- Branch: United States Army
- Engagements: American Civil War: Battle of Summit Point; Battle of Opequon; Battle of Fisher's Hill; Battle of Tom's Brook; Battle of Cedar Creek; Battle of Waynesboro, Virginia

Commanders
- Notable commanders: MG Robert Patterson; MG Nathaniel P. Banks; MG David Hunter; MG Philip Sheridan; MG Horatio G. Wright; MG Philip Sheridan; BG Alfred Thomas Torbert

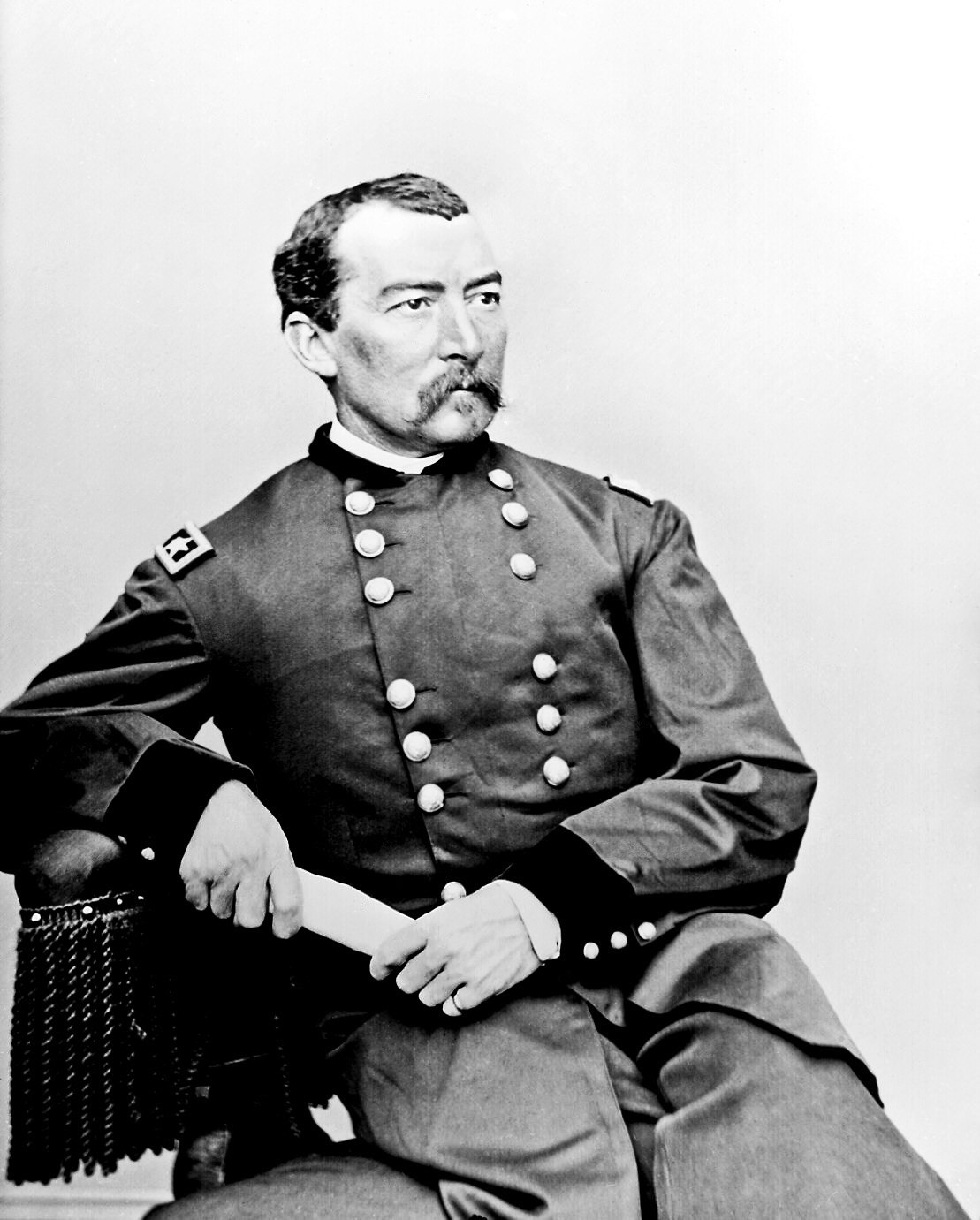
Commander of the Army of the Shenandoah after August 1864

The Army of the Shenandoah was a field army of the Union Army active during the American Civil War. First organized as the Department of the Shenandoah in 1861 and then disbanded in early 1862, the army became most effective after its recreation on August 1, 1864 under the command of Philip Sheridan. The army's actions during the Valley campaigns of 1864 rendered the Shenandoah Valley of Virginia unable to produce foodstuffs for the Confederate States Army, a condition which would hasten the conclusion of the American Civil War.

== History ==
=== 1861–2 ===
Under the command of Major General Robert Patterson before the three-month enlistments of a majority of its troops expired, the Department of Pennsylvania operated as the lone element of Union Army in the Shenandoah Valley of Virginia. After achieving a tactical victory at the Battle of Hoke's Run on July 2 and contributing indirectly to the Union disaster at the First Battle of Bull Run on July 21, its unexpired regiments and commanders were absorbed into a new Department of the Shenandoah under the command of Major General Nathaniel P. Banks on July 25, 1861. Neither Patterson nor Banks referred to his commands as the Army of the Shenandoah in official correspondence, and when the Army of the Potomac adopted a Corps structure on March 18, 1862, Banks' command was redesignated as the "Fifth Corps."

=== 1864 ===
On May 21, 1864, Major General David Hunter was appointed to command the Department of West Virginia. Hunter designated the field forces of his department the "Army of the Shenandoah". Hunter was in command of the Army of the Shenandoah from May 21 to July 3 which consisted of two infantry divisions and two cavalry divisions. The First and Second Infantry Divisions were commanded by Brigadier Generals Jeremiah C. Sullivan and George Crook respectively. The First and Second Cavalry Divisions were commanded by Brigadier Generals Julius Stahel (succeeded by Alfred N. Duffie) and William W. Averell respectively. In May Crook's and Averell's divisions fought independently at the battle of Cloyd's Mountain. Hunter personally led Sullivan's and Stahel's divisions at the battle of Piedmont. All four divisions were joined for the battle of Lynchburg. On July 3, George Crook assumed command of both infantry divisions and designated this as a new field army named the Army of the Kanawha.

The force was next created by order of Ulysses S. Grant on August 1, 1864, in response to a raid by Jubal Early and his Confederate army of 15,000 on Washington, D.C., and especially his defeat of Lew Wallace at the Battle of Monocacy Junction. The new Army of the Shenandoah was composed of the Union VI Corps (commanded by Horatio G. Wright), XIX Corps (William H. Emory), and George Crook's Army of West Virginia (VIII Corps). It was placed under Sheridan's command with orders to repel Early, deal with Confederate guerillas, and press on into the Shenandoah Valley in Virginia.

Early, ever the cunning strategist, kept his force moving so as not to be trapped by Sheridan's vastly superior force. His raid had, if anything, a good deal of success for southern morale. Confederate General Robert E. Lee, coming to the conclusion that Early had done all that was practical, ordered Early to return two of his divisions to Richmond and remain to tie up Sheridan. Learning of this, Sheridan waited until Early weakened himself and then attacked at the Third Battle of Winchester on September 19 and then again at the Battle of Fisher's Hill on September 20–21. By the end of these battles, Early's force was effectively out of the war, and Sheridan proceeded with his secondary orders to destroy the ability of the Shenandoah Valley to produce foodstuffs for the Confederacy, torching farms and more than 2,000 mills.

Reinforced again in reaction to the threat of Sheridan's 31,000-man army, Early moved against Sheridan once more. After a decisive cavalry victory by Union forces under Brig. Gen. George Armstrong Custer at the Battle of Tom's Brook, Early's army launched a surprise attack against Sheridan at the Battle of Cedar Creek on October 19. Initially successful, the Confederates were repelled by a Union counterattack and the Valley was firmly under Union control.

Following those battles in the fall of 1864, the majority of the Army of the Shenandoah was detached to Grant at Petersburg and to William Tecumseh Sherman in Georgia. Sheridan joined Grant for the Appomattox campaign where Sheridan commanded the Army of the Shenandoah, which included two divisions of cavalry commanded by Wesley Merritt. In late April 1865, command of the army then passed to Brig. Gen. A. T. A. Torbert until July 12, 1865, when the force was disbanded for the final time.

== Commanders ==
- April 27 – July 25, 1861: Major General Robert Patterson
- July 25, 1861 – March 18, 1862: Major General Nathaniel P. Banks
- 21 May – 3 July 1864: Major General David Hunter
- August 7 – October 16, 1864: Major General Philip Sheridan
- October 16–19, 1864: Major General Horatio G. Wright
- October 19, 1864 – April 22, 1865: Major General Philip Sheridan
- April 22 – July 12, 1865: Major General Alfred Thomas Torbert

== Notable battles ==
- July 2, 1861: Battle of Hoke's Run (Patterson)
- May 25, 1862: First Battle of Winchester (Banks, Order of Battle)
- September 19, 1864: Third Battle of Winchester (Sheridan, Order of Battle)
- September 20 – September 21: Battle of Fisher's Hill (Sheridan)
- October 9: Battle of Tom's Brook (Sheridan)
- October 19: Battle of Cedar Creek (Wright, Sheridan, Order of Battle)
- April, 1865: Appomattox Campaign (Merritt, Order of Battle)

== See also ==
- Confederate Army of the Shenandoah
