= Department of the Susquehanna =

Military department in the American Civil War

The Department of the Susquehanna was a military department created by the United States War Department during the Gettysburg campaign of the American Civil War. Its goal was to protect the state capital and the southern portions of the commonwealth of Pennsylvania, and to deny the Confederate army passage across the vital Susquehanna River.

== Gettysburg Campaign ==
On June 9, 1863, President Abraham Lincoln, responding to Robert E. Lee's impending invasion of Maryland and Pennsylvania, called for 100,000 volunteers from Pennsylvania, New York, and Ohio to help repel the invasion, with only about 33,000 recruits answering his call. Secretary of War Edwin M. Stanton ordered the creation of two military departments, the Departments of the Susequehanna and Monongahela, to organize these militia and defend the state of Pennsylvania. The Department of the Susquehanna consisted of all troops east of Johnstown and the Laurel Highlands, and it was initially headquartered at Chambersburg. It was placed under the command of Major General Darius N. Couch, who had formerly commanded II Corps, Army of the Potomac.

As the Confederates entered the Cumberland Valley, Couch moved his headquarters to Harrisburg. Militia from New York and New Jersey arrived in the capital to provide manpower while the newly raised Pennsylvania emergency militia drilled at Camp Curtin. New York troops serving under the Department of the Susquehanna were first engaged in a skirmish with Confederate cavalry under Albert G. Jenkins at Greencastle on June 20, losing one man killed (considered the first casualty of the Gettysburg Campaign on Northern soil). The New Yorkers eventually retired to Harrisburg, allowing Jenkins to occupy Chambersburg.

Couch ordered that no Confederate unit was to be allowed to cross the Susquehanna River. He authorized the construction of earthworks and fortifications near Lemoyne to defend Harrisburg and its river bridges. He assigned William F. "Baldy" Smith to defend the state capital. Couch designated his aide-de-camp, Major Granville O. Haller, as the sector commander to defend Adams and York counties, with regional headquarters in Gettysburg. Couch sent out three regiments of state emergency militia to Haller's assistance, with the 26th Pennsylvania Volunteer Militia (P.V.M.) sent to Gettysburg, the 20th P.V.M. to York County, and the 27th P.V.M. to Columbia to defend the Columbia-Wrightsville Bridge, a vital crossing over the Susquehanna.

On June 26, 1863, advancing Confederates under Jubal Early and John Brown Gordon routed Haller's militia at Gettysburg and occupied the borough. Haller retired to York, which surrendered on June 28, becoming the largest Northern town to fall during the Civil War. Prior to the Confederate occupation, Haller removed his troops to Wrightsville, where in obedience to Couch's orders, Haller ordered the covered bridge burned to prevent Confederate passage into Lancaster County.

The troops of the department assigned to General Smith took part in skirmishes against elements of Richard S. Ewell's corps in Cumberland County at Sporting Hill on June 30 and against J.E.B. Stuart at Carlisle on July 1. Couch dispatched Smith's men, along with many of Haller's, to help George G. Meade pursue Robert E. Lee's retreating Army of Northern Virginia. The Department of the Susquehanna remained operational following the conclusion of the campaign, although many of the militia were sent home.

== Subsequent actions ==
With the threat repelled, Couch moved his headquarters back to Chambersburg, and the department played an administrative role the rest of the year, providing militia to help clean up the Gettysburg Battlefield and assisting in the military preparations for the dedication of the Gettysburg National Cemetery and Lincoln's visit, which resulted in the Gettysburg Address.

In January 1864, Couch responded with troops to rumors that a band of disgruntled constituents planned to prevent the inauguration of Pennsylvania Governor Andrew Curtin. In March, with rumors rife of yet another raid, Couch made preparations to again defend the state. However, it was not until late July when the Confederates again arrived in Pennsylvania, when John McCausland raided and burned Chambersburg. Couch was again engaged in sending out 100-day volunteers, militia and Federal troops to repel the enemy. In September, the department dispatched troops to various locations to help oversee the military draft.

The following month, the department again responded to a threatened Confederate border raid. Philip H. Sheridan's subsequent victories in the Valley Campaigns of 1864 finally removed any further threats. On April 6, 1864, the Department of the Monongahela was incorporated into the department. On December 1, 1864, the Department of the Susquehanna was renamed as the Department of Pennsylvania.

== Sources ==
- Boatner, Mark M. III (1988). The Civil War Dictionary (Revised ed.). New York: David McKay. ISBN 978-0-8129-1726-0.
- U.S. War Department, The War of the Rebellion: A Compilation of the Official Records of the Union and Confederate Armies, 70 volumes in 4 series. Washington, D.C.: United States Government Printing Office, 1880–1901.
