= Department of Pennsylvania =

- Pennsylvania flag
- Active: April 27 - July 25, 1861
- Country: United States of America
- Branch: United States Army
- Type: Field Army
- Engagements: American Civil War: Battle of Hoke's Run

Commanders
- Notable commanders: Robert Patterson

The Department of Pennsylvania (or General Patterson's Army) was a large military unit in the Union army at the outset of the American Civil War. Established on April 27, 1861, its territory consisted of Pennsylvania, Delaware, and all of Maryland not embraced in the Department of Annapolis (later renamed Department of Maryland) and the Department of Washington. Its remnants were absorbed into the short-lived Department of the Shenandoah on July 19, 1861, which also absorbed the Department of Maryland on July 25, and on August 24 was merged into the Department of the Potomac.

== History ==
It was under the command of Major General Robert Patterson, its manpower mainly consisted of three-month troops from the states of Pennsylvania and New York. After achieving a tactical victory at the Battle of Hoke's Run on July 2 and contributing indirectly to the Union disaster at the First Battle of Bull Run on July 21, its unexpired regiments and commanders were absorbed into the Department of the Shenandoah under the command of Major General Nathaniel P. Banks on July 25, 1861.

=== Pennsylvania Reserves ===
When President Abraham Lincoln called for 75,000 volunteers in the spring of 1861, the Commonwealth of Pennsylvania produced more than twice its quota. For political reasons the U.S. Secretary of War, Simon Cameron, rejected fifteen regiments for immediate service, and they became known as the 1st through 15th Pennsylvania Reserves. Pennsylvania elected to retain, organize, train and equip them at its own expense.
These fifteen regiments were unavailable either to Patterson in the Shenandoah Valley or to McDowell at First Bull Run. "Within four days after the disaster at Bull's Run, eleven regiments of this fine body of men (armed, drilled, clothed, equipped, and in all respects ready for active service) were in Washington," Governor Andrew G. Curtin reminded the State Legislature.

=== Battle of Hoke's Run ===
On July 2, 1861, Major General Robert Patterson's army, called the Department of Pennsylvania, crossed the Potomac River near Williamsport, Maryland, and marched on the main road toward Martinsburg, Virginia. Near Hoke's Run, Union forces clashed with Confederate forces and slowly drove them back toward Winchester. Withdrawing before Patterson's larger force, Colonel Thomas J. Jackson accomplished his orders to delay the Federal advance.

The encounter was very brief, and three regiments reported casualties: First Wisconsin Infantry, Eleventh Pennsylvania Infantry, and Fifteenth Pennsylvania Infantry. The order of battle shows all units in the organization at its peak size and structure.

=== First Battle of Bull Run ===
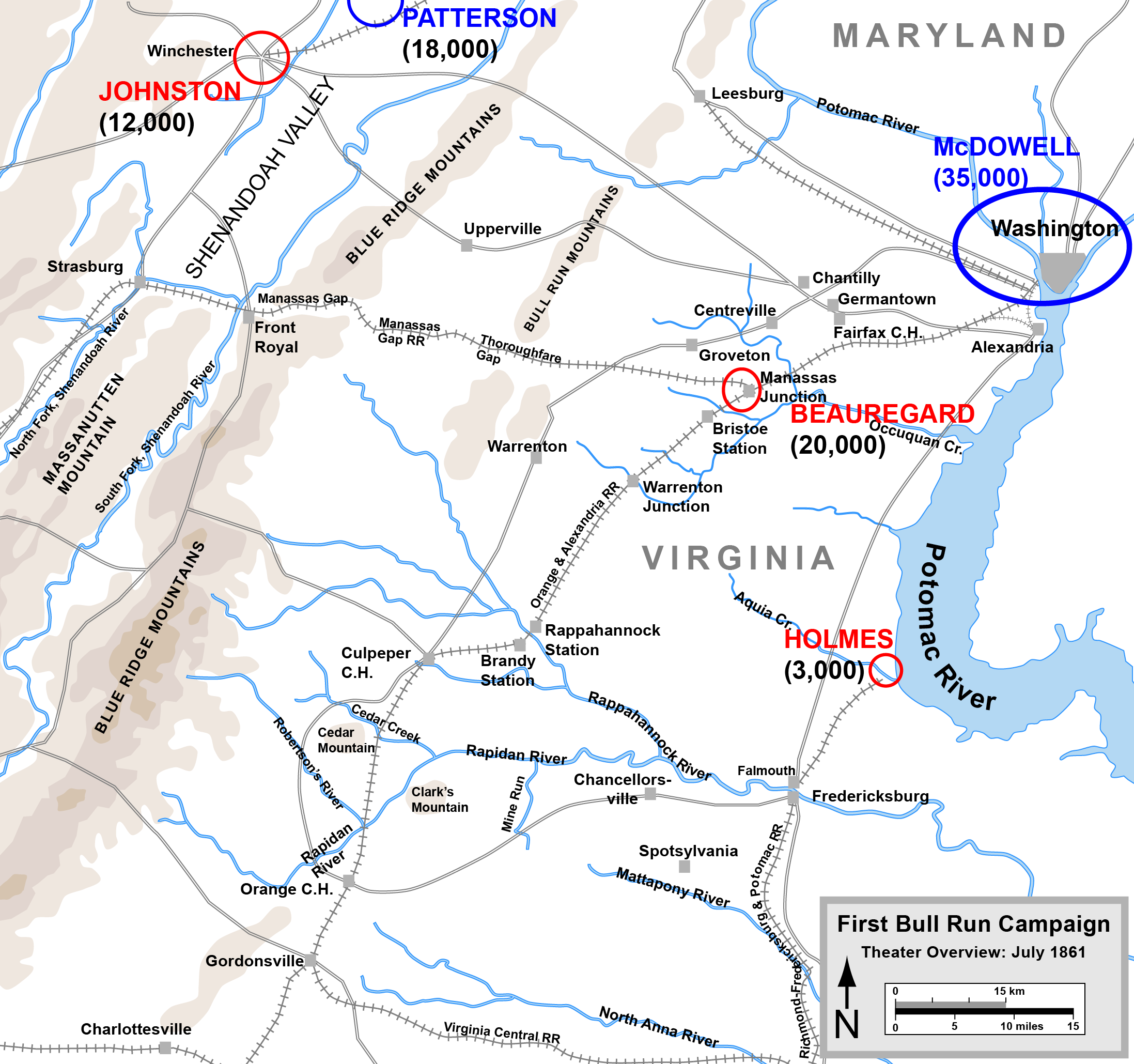
Northern Virginia Theater in July 1861. Further north were 15,000 Pennsylvanians who were trained and equipped but rejected for Federal service by Secretary of War, Simon Cameron. Confederate Union

During the afternoon of July 21, 1861, the arrival of BG General Joseph E. Johnston reversed the tide of Battle, the ensuing Confederate counterattack turned victory into a rout, and euphoric Northern hopes for a short war were quickly dashed. Lieutenant General Winfield Scott had hoped that Patterson and his Department of Pennsylvania would prevent Johnston from reinforcing Beauregard at Manassas Junction, and when Johnston's troops became a major deciding factor, Patterson's actions became a subject of controversy.

After the fact, Patterson believed:

- He had requested from General Scott a direct order to attack Johnston and not received it;
- He believed that the battle at Manassas would be fought on July 16, 1861, and his responsibility was to delay Johnston until the 16th;
- He had successfully occupied Johnston through July 16 and for [several] additional days thereafter;
- Without knowledge of the battle's nonoccurrence on July 16, he had promptly notified General Scott when Johnston actually left the Shenandoah Valley on July 20.
- His entire course of action had been reviewed and approved by his subordinate officers, as ordered, and
- He had fully complied with every direct order issued to him.

Patterson was honorably discharged on July 27, 1861, and never received another commission. He sought to redress the record through every possible avenue, including a personal audience with President Abraham Lincoln, and later published his own version of events.

== Recreation ==
On December 1, 1864, the Department of Pennsylvania was recreated, with the merging of the Department of the Susquehanna with the Department of the Monongahela. It operated until June 27, 1865, under the Middle Military Division.

== See also ==
- Department of the Susquehanna
