= Robert Patterson (general) =

Irish-born American United States Army and Union Army major general (1792-1881)

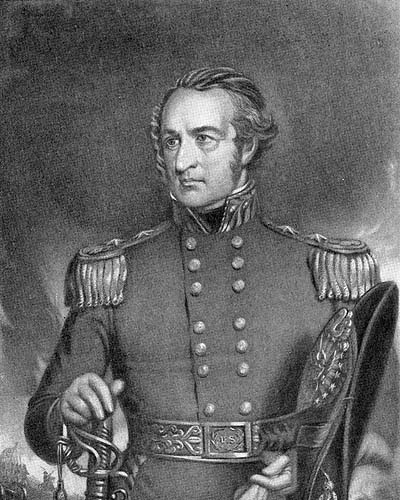
- A portrait depicting Patterson during the Mexican-American War
- Born: January 12, 1792; Strabane, County Tyrone, Kingdom of Ireland
- Died: August 7, 1881 (aged 89); Philadelphia, Pennsylvania, U.S.
- Burial place: Laurel Hill Cemetery, Philadelphia, Pennsylvania, U.S.
- Military career
- Allegiance: United States; Union
- Branch: Regular Army; Union Army
- Service years: 1812–1815; 1846–1848; 1861
- Rank: Major General
- Commands: Pennsylvania Militia; Army of the Shenandoah
- Conflicts: War of 1812; Philadelphia nativist riots; Mexican–American War; Siege of Veracruz; Battle of Cerro Gordo; American Civil War; Battle of Hoke's Run; Battle of Bunker Hill
- Other work: cotton miller, writer

Robert Patterson (January 12, 1792 – August 7, 1881) was an Irish-born American military officer who served in the United States Army during the War of 1812, the Mexican-American War and the American Civil War.

He was the commander of the Pennsylvania Militia during the Philadelphia nativist riots, and was politically active in Pennsylvania as a Jacksonian Democrat. He was a wealthy businessman and owned 30 cotton mills in Pennsylvania, a sugar plantation in Louisiana, and other investments in railroads and steamships.

In the Mexican-American War, Patterson was a major general and served as second in command to Winfield Scott. He fought at the Siege of Veracruz and the Battle of Cerro Gordo.

Patterson was a major general at the start of the Civil War. He served only three months due to his failure to attack Confederate general Joseph E. Johnston's troops after the Battle of Hoke's Run. This allowed Johnston to support P. G. T. Beauregard and give the Union Army their first defeat at the First Battle of Bull Run.

Patterson was widely blamed for the Union loss at Bull Run and defended his Civil War performance in his book, A Narrative of the Campaign in the Valley of the Shenandoah, in 1861, published in 1865.

== Early life and education ==
Patterson was born on January 12, 1792, in Strabane, County Tyrone, Ireland, to Francis Patterson and Ann Graham. His father was associated with Wolfe Tone and Robert Emmet and participated in the Irish Rebellion of 1798 against the British. Francis Patterson was convicted for his part in the rebellion and sentenced to be hanged, however his family connections intervened and the sentence was commuted and he was banished from Ireland instead.

In the fall of 1798, Patterson and his family emigrated to the United States and settled in Delaware County, Pennsylvania. He received his education in public schools and in 1807, worked in a counting room of a business involved in trade with East India.

== Military career ==
=== War of 1812 ===
He volunteered for service during the War of 1812 and rose to the rank of colonel in the Pennsylvania Militia and captain in the United States Army.

He served as an assistant quartermaster general and on the staff of brigadier general Joseph Bloomfield. He was discharged in 1815 as a captain.

=== Pennsylvania Militia ===
Patterson served as major general in the Pennsylvania State militia. In 1838, he helped quell rioting in Philadelphia. In July 1844, in preparation for a planned July 4 nativist parade, Pennsylvania Governor David R. Porter assigned Patterson to provide protection to Irish churches in case of a nativist attack. Patterson helped quell the Philadelphia nativist riots against Irish Catholics, which resulted in the destruction of St. Michael's and St. Augustine's Churches. The first riot took place in Kensington in May, and another took place in the Southwark section of the city in July. Patterson led militia into combat with rioting civilians, leading to loss of life on both sides.

=== Mexican-American War ===
At the outbreak of the Mexican-American War, Patterson was commissioned a major general of volunteers and given command of the 2nd division of the Army of Occupation under brigadier general Gideon J. Pillow. He was considered for command of the overall expedition by President James K. Polk, however it was given to Winfield Scott instead. He was Scott's second in command and was placed in command of the expedition's Volunteer Division. He arrived before Scott at the Siege of Veracruz and overruled a proposed frontal attack of the fortifications by general David E. Twiggs. He fought at the Battle of Cerro Gordo along with the future Confederate General P.G.T. Beauregard and was wounded.

In a book on his service in the Mexican-American War, J. Jacob Oswandel praised Patterson for his service as Quartermaster, ensuring the troops were well supplied. However, he also reports that some troops did not think highly of him and that "They think, like a good many others, that he is braver before going into the battle than in the midst of the battle."

Patterson led the American pursuit of the Mexican Army and was the first to enter Jalapa. While the U.S. Army was stationed at Jalapa, Patterson returned to the U.S. with other volunteer units whose enlistment time had expired.

=== Civil War ===
In April 1861, Patterson was mustered into service for the Civil War as a Union army major general of Pennsylvania volunteers and commanded the Department of Pennsylvania and the Army of the Shenandoah under the overall command of Winfield Scott.

His son Francis Engle Patterson and his son-in-law John Joseph Abercrombie also served as Union Army generals during the Civil War.

In June, Patterson took command of the Pennsylvania volunteers at Chambersburg, Pennsylvania, with orders to retake Harpers Ferry, West Virginia. He received guidance from Scott to await additional reinforcement and then proceed with caution. While underway, he received additional communication from Scott that Johnston was prepared to make "a desperate stand" at Harper's Ferry.

On July 2, Patterson encountered Confederate Brigadier general Thomas J. Jackson at the Battle of Hoke's Run and forced his troops into retreat. Jackson was ordered to slow the advance of Patterson's troops and did so with a fighting retreat.

On July 3, Patterson occupied Martinsburg, West Virginia, but remained inactive until July 15 when he marched to Bunker Hill. Instead of continuing to Winchester, Virginia, Patterson turned east and then retreated to Harpers Ferry. This took pressure off of Brig. Gen. Joseph E. Johnston in the Shenandoah Valley and he was able to march his troops and reinforce the Confederates under P.G.T. Beauregard at the First Battle of Bull Run. Scott's series of orders to Patterson had been less than clear and somewhat contradictory. This led to Patterson's failure to hold Johnston in the Valley and prevent him from reinforcing Beauregard.

Nevertheless, Johnston declared that Patterson's army had largely deterred him from pursuing the shattered and disorganized Union troops as they retreated back to Washington, D.C. following the battle. After multiple messages encouraging Patterson to attack, Scott replaced Patterson with general Nathaniel P. Banks on July 19, 1861. Patterson was criticized for his failure to contain the Confederate forces. He was honorably discharged and mustered out of the Army on July 27, 1861.

== Business career ==
Patterson had multiple business interests including 30 cotton mills in Pennsylvania, a sugar plantation in Louisiana and investments in railroad and steamship businesses.

After the Civil War, Patterson defended his Civil War performance in his book, A Narrative of the Campaign in the Valley of the Shenandoah, in 1861, published in 1865.

== Political career ==
Patterson was influential in Pennsylvania politics as a Jacksonian Democrat. He was one of the five Col. Pattersons in the Pennsylvania Convention who nominated Andrew Jackson for the presidency and in 1836 was President of the Pennsylvania Electoral College that cast the vote for Martin Van Buren.

During the contested election of President Rutherford B. Hayes, Patterson was asked by President Ulysses S. Grant to travel to Washington, D.C. and negotiate with congressional members from the South.

== Personal life ==
In 1817, Patterson married Sarah Engle of the Germantown neighborhood of Philadelphia.

He was appointed president of the board of visitors to West Point twice - the first time by General Andrew Jackson in 1835 and the second time by President Rutherford B. Hayes.

He was president of the Aztec Club of 1847 from 1867 to 1881 and was a Companion of the Military Order of the Loyal Legion of the United States. During his tenure as President of the Aztec Club, the club successfully changed from a military society to a hereditary one.

He was a member of the Friendly Sons of St. Patrick, a trustee of Lafayette College in Easton, Pennsylvania, from 1826 to 1835, and president of the college's board of trustees from 1876 to 1881.

== Death and legacy ==
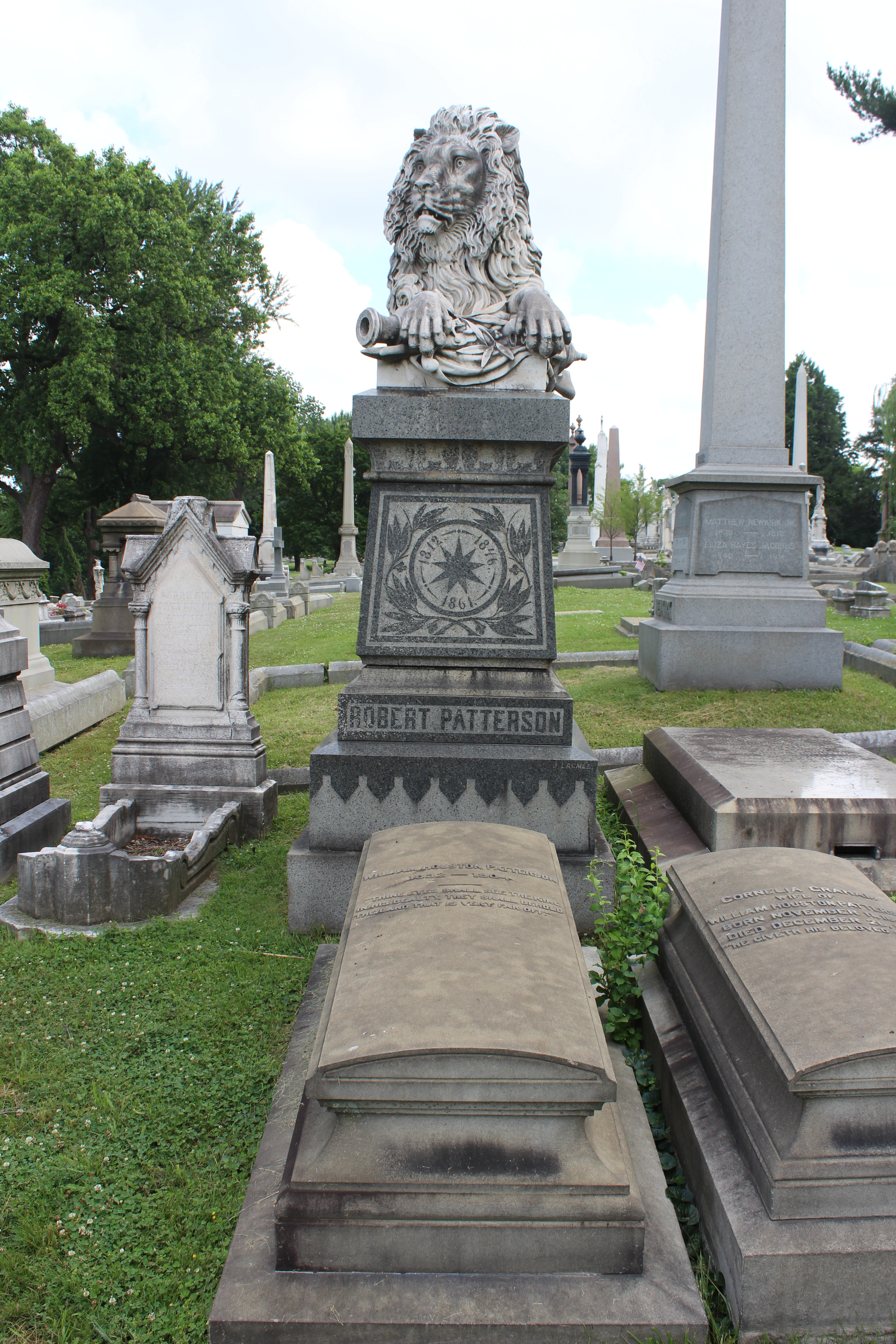
Patterson's memorial and tombstone in Laurel Hill Cemetery in Philadelphia

Patterson died in Philadelphia on August 7, 1881, at age 89, and was interred in Laurel Hill Cemetery. At his funeral, his pallbearers included Ulysses S. Grant, William Tecumseh Sherman, Fitz John Porter and Winfield Scott Hancock.

Patterson's mansion at the southwest corner of 13th and Locust Streets in Philadelphia was purchased from John Hare Powel in 1836. After Patterson's death in 1881, the Historical Society of Pennsylvania purchased the mansion to use as the society's headquarters. Between 1905 and 1909, the mansion was demolished, and a new building on the site was dedicated in 1910. Some of the foundation and fireplace mantels from the original mansion still remain.

== Published works ==
- A Narrative of the Campaign in the Valley of the Shenandoah, in 1861., Philadelphia: Sherman & Co., 1865

== See also ==
- List of American Civil War generals (Union)
