= Winchester order of battle =

Winchester order of battle may refer to:

- First Battle of Winchester order of battle
- Second Battle of Winchester order of battle
- Third Battle of Winchester order of battle

== See also ==
- Battle of Winchester (disambiguation)
- Winchester (disambiguation)
