= Third Battle of Winchester order of battle: Union =

The following Union Army units and commanders fought in the Third Battle of Winchester in the American Civil War. The Confederate order of battle is listed separately. The battle was fought on September 19, 1864 near Winchester, Virginia, and Opequon Creek. The battle is also known as the Battle of Opequon or the Battle of Opequon Creek.

== Abbreviations used ==
=== Military rank ===
- MG = Major General
- BG = Brigadier General
- Col = Colonel
- Ltc = Lieutenant Colonel
- Maj = Major
- Cpt = Captain
- Lt = Lieutenant
- Bvt = Brevet

=== Other ===
- w = wounded
- k = killed
- c = captured

== Army of the Shenandoah ==
MG Philip Sheridan, Commanding (Note: Source for all information is the Official Records... by Ainsworth and Kirkley of the United States War Department, Volume XLIII, Chapter LV, pp. 107–112. This source has been compared to Appendix 1 in Scott Patchan's The Last Battle of Winchester..., and differences are footnoted. A small number of cases use additional sources, such as the National Park Service, and are footnoted.)

Staff: Maj George Alexander Forsyth

=== VI Corps ===
MG Horatio Wright

Division	Brigade	Regiments and Others
First Division BG David Allen Russell (k); BG Emory Upton (w); Col Oliver Edwards	1st Brigade Ltc Edward L. Campbell (Note: Col William Penrose is listed by Pachan but not by the official records. Campbell's September 26 report says he (Campbell) was in command at Opequon.)	4th New Jersey: Cpt Baldwin Hufty; 10th New Jersey: Maj Lambert Boeman; 15th New Jersey: Cpt William T. Cornish
First Division BG David Allen Russell (k); BG Emory Upton (w); Col Oliver Edwards	2nd Brigade BG Emory Upton; Col Joseph Hamblin	2nd Connecticut Heavy Artillery: Col Ranald S. Mackenzie; 65th New York: Col Joseph Hamblin, Cpt Henry C. Fisk; 121st New York: Cpt John D. P. Douw; 95th Pennsylvania: Cpt Francis J. Randall (Note: 95th and 96th Pennsylvania were guarding trains and not engaged in the battle.); 96th Pennsylvania Battalion
First Division BG David Allen Russell (k); BG Emory Upton (w); Col Oliver Edwards	3rd Brigade Col Oliver Edwards; Col Isaac C. Bassett (Note: Bassett not listed by Patchan. Assumed command when Edwards assumed command of division.)	37th Massachusetts: Ltc George L. Montague; 49th Pennsylvania: Ltc Baynton J. Hickman; 82nd Pennsylvania: Col Isaac C. Bassett; 119th Pennsylvania: Ltc Gideon Clark; 2nd Rhode Island (battalion): Cpt Elisha Hunt Rhodes; 5th Wisconsin (battalion): Maj Charles W. Kempf
Second Division BG George W. Getty	1st Brigade BG Frank Wheaton	62nd New York: Ltc Theodore B. Hamilton (w); 93rd Pennsylvania: Ltc John S. Long; 98th Pennsylvania: Ltc John B. Kohler; 102nd Pennsylvania: Maj James H. Coleman; 139th Pennsylvania: Maj Robert Munroe
Second Division BG George W. Getty	2nd Brigade (a.k.a. First Vermont Brigade) Col James M. Warner (Note: Brigadier General Lewis A. Grant was on a leave of absence.); Ltc Amasa S. Tracy (supervised part of line)	2nd Vermont: Maj Enoch E. Johnson; 3rd Vermont: Maj Horace W. Floyd; 4th Vermont; 5th Vermont: Cpt Addison Brown, Jr. (w); 6th Vermont: Cpt Martin W. Davis; 11th Vermont/1st Heavy Artillery: Maj Aldace F. Walker
Second Division BG George W. Getty	3rd Brigade BG Daniel D. Bidwell	1st Maine Veterans (Note: Both sources list this regiment as the 7th Maine. However, the 1st Regiment, Maine Veteran Infantry was formed on August 21, 1864 from that and other regiments.): Maj Stephen C. Fletcher; 43rd New York: Maj Charles A. Milliken; 49th New York (battalion) (Note: Patchan lists this battalion as the 29th New York, but Lt. Col. Holt was in the 49th.) Ltc Erastus D. Holt; 77th New York: Ltc Winsor B. French; 122nd New York: Ltc Augustus Wade Dwight(w), Maj Jabez M. Brower; 61st Pennsylvania (battalion): Cpt Charles S. Greene (w), Cpt David J. Taylor
Third Division BG James Ricketts	1st Brigade Col William Emerson	14th New Jersey: Maj Peter Vredenburgh (k), Cpt Jacob J. Janeway; 106th New York: Cpt Peter Robinson; 151st New York: Ltc Thomas M. Fay; 87th Pennsylvania: Col John W. Schall; 10th Vermont: Maj Edwin Dillingham (k), Cpt Lucius T. Hunt
Third Division BG James Ricketts	2nd Brigade Col J. Warren Keifer	6th Maryland: Col John W. Horn (w), Cpt Clifton K. Printiss; 9th New York Heavy Artillery: Maj Charles Burgess; 110th Ohio: Ltc Otho H. Binkley; 122nd Ohio: Col William H. Ball; 126th Ohio: Ltc Aaron W. Ebright (k), Cpt George W. Hoge; 67th Pennsylvania: Lt John F. Young; 138th Pennsylvania: Col Matthew R. McClennan (w) (Note: Col McClennan, who had been ill, retired from field due to exhaustion.), Maj Lewis A. May
Artillery	Artillery Brigade Col Charles H. Tompkins	5th Maine Light Artillery: Cpt Greenlief T. Stevens; 1st Massachusetts Light Artillery, Battery A: Cpt William H. McCartney; 1st New York Light Artillery, Battery: Lt William H. Johnson (k), Lt Orsamus R. Van Etten; 1st Rhode Island Light Artillery, Battery C: Lt Jacob H. Lamb; 1st Rhode Island Light Artillery, Battery G: Cpt George W. Adams; 5th U.S. Artillery, Battery M: Cpt James McKnight

=== Army of West Virginia ===
BG George Crook

Division	Brigade	Regiments and Others
First Division Col Joseph Thoburn	1st Brigade Col George D. Wells	34th Massachusetts: Maj Harrison W. Pratt; 5th New York Heavy Artillery, 2nd Battalion: Major Caspar Urban; 116th Ohio: Ltc Thomas F. Wildes; 123rd Ohio: Cpt John W. Chamberlain
First Division Col Joseph Thoburn	3rd Brigade Col Thomas M. Harris	23rd Illinois (battalion): Cpt Samuel A. Simison; 54th Pennsylvania: Ltc John P. Linton (w) Maj Enoch D. Yutzy; 10th West Virginia: Maj Henry H. Withers; 11th West Virginia: Ltc Van H. Bukey; 15th West Virginia: Maj John W. Holliday
Second Division (Kanawha Division) Col Isaac H. Duval (w); Col Rutherford B. Hayes	1st Brigade Col Rutherford B. Hayes; Col Hiram F. Devol	23rd Ohio: Ltc James M. Comly; 36th Ohio: Col Hiram F. Devol, Ltc William H. G. Adrey; 5th West Virginia (battalion): Ltc William H. Enochs; 13th West Virginia: Col William K. Brown
Second Division (Kanawha Division) Col Isaac H. Duval (w); Col Rutherford B. Hayes	2nd Brigade Col Daniel D. Johnson (w); Ltc Benjamin F. Coates	34th Ohio (battalion): Ltc Luther Furney; 91st Ohio: Ltc Benjamin F. Coates, Maj Lemuel Z. Cadet; 9th West Virginia: Maj Benjamin F. Skinner; 14th West Virginia: Ltc George W. Taggart
Artillery	Artillery Brigade Cpt Henry A. du Pont	1st Ohio Light Artillery, Battery L: Cpt Frank C. Gibbs; 1st Pennsylvania Light Artillery, Battery D: Lt William Munk; 5th U.S. Artillery, Battery B: Cpt Henry A. du Pont

Note: Thoburn's 2nd Brigade was detached to guard wagons and field hospitals.

=== XIX Corps ===
BG William H. Emory

Division	Brigade	Regiments and Others
First Division BG William Dwight	1st Brigade Col George L. Beal	29th Maine: Maj William Knowlton (mw), Cpt Alfred L. Turner; 30th Massachusetts: Cpt Samuel D. Shipley; 114th New York: Col Samuel R. Per Lee (w), Maj Oscar H. Curtis; 116th New York: Col George M. Love; 153rd New York: Col Edwin P. Davis
First Division BG William Dwight	2nd Brigade BG James W. McMillan	12th Connecticut: Ltc Frank H. Peck (mw), Cpt Sidney E. Clark; 160th New York: Ltc John B. Van Petten; 47th Pennsylvania: Col Tilghman H. Good; 8th Vermont: Col Stephen Thomas
First Division BG William Dwight	Division Artillery	New York Light Artillery, 5th Battery: Lt John V. Grant
Second Division BG Cuvier Grover	1st Brigade BG Henry W. Birge	9th Connecticut: Col Thomas W. Cahill; 12th Maine: Ltc Edwin Ilsley; 14th Maine: Col Thomas W. Porter; 26th Massachusetts: Col Alphon B. Farr; 14th New Hampshire: Col Alexander Gardiner (k); Cpt Flavel L. Tolman; 75th New York: Ltc Willoughby Babcock (k), Maj Benjamin F. Thurber
Second Division BG Cuvier Grover	2nd Brigade Col Edward L. Molineux	13th Connecticut: Col Charles D. Blinn; 3rd Massachusetts Cavalry (dismounted): Ltc Lorenzo D. Sargent; 11th Indiana: Col Daniel Macauley; 22nd Iowa: Col Harvey Graham; 131st New York: Col Nicholas W. Day; 159th New York: Ltc William Waltermire
Second Division BG Cuvier Grover	3rd Brigade Col Jacob Sharpe (w); Ltc Alfred Neafie	38th Massachusetts: Ltc James P. Richardson (w), Maj Charles F. Allen; 128th New York: Cpt Charles R. Anderson; 156th New York: Ltc Alfred Neafie, Cpt James J. Hoyt; 175th New York (3 companies): Cpt Charles McCarthy; 176th New York: Maj Charles Lewis
Second Division BG Cuvier Grover	4th Brigade Col David Shunk	8th Indiana: Ltc Alexander J. Kenny; 18th Indiana: Ltc William S. Charles; 24th Iowa: Ltc John Q. Wilds; 28th Iowa: Ltc Bartholomew W. Wilson
Second Division BG Cuvier Grover	Division Artillery	Maine Light Artillery, 1st Battery: Cpt Albert W. Bradbury
Artillery	Reserve Cpt Elijah D. Taft	1st Rhode Island Light Artillery, Battery D: Lt Frederick Chase; Indiana Light Artillery, 17th Battery: Cpt Milton L. Milner

=== Cavalry Corps ===
BG Alfred T. A. Torbert

Division	Brigade	Regiments and Others
First Division BG Wesley Merritt	1st Brigade BG George Armstrong Custer	1st Michigan Cavalry: Col Peter Stagg; 5th Michigan Cavalry: Maj Smith H. Hastings; 6th Michigan Cavalry: Col James H. Kidd; 7th Michigan Cavalry: Ltc Melvin Brewer (mw); 25th New York Cavalry: Maj Charles J. Seymour
First Division BG Wesley Merritt	2nd Brigade BG Thomas C. Devin	4th New York Cavalry: Maj August Haurand (w), Maj Edward Schwartz; 6th New York Cavalry: Maj William E. Beardsley; 9th New York Cavalry: Ltc George S. Nichols; 19th New York Cavalry (1st Dragoons): Col Alfred Gibbs; 17th Pennsylvania Cavalry: Maj Coe Durland
First Division BG Wesley Merritt	Reserve Brigade Col Charles Russell Lowell	2nd Massachusetts Cavalry: Col Caspar Crowninshield; 6th Pennsylvania Cavalry: Maj Charles L. Leiper; 1st U.S. Cavalry: Cpt Eugene M. Baker; 1st Maryland Cavalry, Potomac Home Brigade: Col Henry A. Cole; 2nd U.S. Cavalry: Cpt Theophilus F. Rodenbough (w), Cpt Robert S. Smith; 5th U.S. Cavalry: Lt Gustavus Urban
Second Division BG William W. Averell	1st Brigade Col James M. Schoonmaker	22nd Pennsylvania Cavalry: Ltc Andrew J. Greenfield; 8th Ohio Cavalry: Col Alpheus S. Moore; 14th Pennsylvania Cavalry: Cpt Ashbell F. Duncan (mw) Cpt William W. Miles
Second Division BG William W. Averell	2nd Brigade Col William H. Powell (Note: Col Henry Capehart (1st West Virginia Cavalry) is listed by the Official Records as commander of Averell's Second Brigade, while Patchan lists Powell. Powell was described as leading the brigade by one soldier, and Powell replaced Averell on September 23.)	1st New York Cavalry: Maj Timothy Quinn; 1st West Virginia Cavalry: Maj Harvey Farabee; 2nd West Virginia Cavalry: Ltc John J. Hoffman; 3rd West Virginia Cavalry: Maj John S. Witcher
Second Division BG William W. Averell	Division Artillery	5th U.S. Artillery, Battery L: Lt Gulian V. Weir
Third Division BG James H. Wilson	1st Brigade BG John B. McIntosh (w) Ltc George A. Purington	1st Connecticut Cavalry: Maj George O. Marcy; 3rd New Jersey Cavalry: Maj William P. Robeson, Jr.; 2nd New York Cavalry: Cpt Walter C. Hull; 5th New York Cavalry: Maj Abram H. Krom; 2nd Ohio Cavalry: Ltc George A. Purington, Maj A. Bayard Nettleton; 18th Pennsylvania Cavalry: Ltc William P. Brinton (c), Maj John W. Phillips
Third Division BG James H. Wilson	2nd Brigade BG George H. Chapman (w); Col William Wells (Note: Chapman was disabled for several hours as a bullet hit his sword belt. Colonel William Wells became the active commander of the brigade, although Chapman remained on the field.)	3rd Indiana Cavalry (2 companies): Lt Benjamin F. Gilbert; 1st New Hampshire Cavalry (battalion): Col John L. Thompson; 8th New York Cavalry: Ltc William H. Benjamin; 22nd New York Cavalry: Maj Caleb Moore; 1st Vermont Cavalry: Col William Wells
Horse Artillery	Horse Artillery Cpt La Rhett L. Livingston	1st United States, Batteries K and L: Lt Franck E. Taylor; 2nd United States, Batteries B and L: Cpt Charles H. Pierce; 2nd United States, Battery D: Lt Edward B. Williston; 3rd United States, Batteries C and F: Lt William C. Cuyler (Note: Official records say the 3rd and 4th U.S. batteries were not engaged in the battle. However, one historian describes Lieutenant Cuyler and the 3rd U.S. being used by Merritt to assault Fort Collier.); 4th United States, Battery C: Lt Terrence Reilly

== Notes ==
=== References ===
- Ainsworth, Fred C.; Kirkley, Joseph W. (1902). The War of the Rebellion: a Compilation of the Official Records of the Union and Confederate Armies - Series I Volume XLIII Part I - Additions and Corrections, Chapter LV. Washington, District of Columbia: Government Printing Office. OCLC 427057.
- Patchan, Scott C. (2013). The Last Battle of Winchester: Phil Sheridan, Jubal Early, and the Shenandoah Valley Campaign, August 7-September 19, 1864. El Dorado Hills, Calif: Savas Beatie. ISBN 978-1-932714-98-2. OCLC 751578151.
- Sutton, Joseph J. (2001) [1892]. History of the Second Regiment, West Virginia Cavalry Volunteers, During the War of the Rebellion. Huntington, WV: Blue Acorn Press. ISBN 978-0-9628866-5-2. OCLC 263148491.
- Wert, Jeffry D. (2010). From Winchester to Cedar Creek: The Shenandoah Campaign of 1864. Carbondale, Illinois: Southern Illinois University Press. ISBN 978-0-80932-972-4. OCLC 463454602.
