= Winchester, Wisconsin =

Winchester is the name of some places in the U.S. state of Wisconsin:

- Winchester (community), Vilas County, Wisconsin, an unincorporated community in Vilas County
- Winchester (CDP), Wisconsin, a census-designated place in Winnebago County
- Winchester, Vilas County, Wisconsin, a town in Vilas County
- Winchester, Winnebago County, Wisconsin, a town in Winnebago County
