= 6th Vermont Infantry Regiment =

American Civil War Union Army regiment

- Flag of Vermont, 1837–1923
- Active: October 15, 1861 to October 16, 1864
- Disbanded: July 26, 1865
- Allegiance: (United States) United States; Union
- Branch: United States Army; Union Army
- Type: Infantry
- Engagements: Battle at Lee's Mills; Battle of Williamsburg; Battle of Garnett's & Golding's Farm; Battle of Savage's Station; Battle of White Oak Swamp; Battle of Crampton's Gap; Battle of Antietam; Battle of Fredericksburg; Battle of Marye's Heights; Battle of Salem Church; Second Battle of Fredericksburg; Battle of Gettysburg; Battle of Funkstown; Second Battle of Rappahannock Station; Battle of the Wilderness; Battle of Spotsylvania; Battle of Cold Harbor; Second Battle of Petersburg; Battle of Reams' Station; Fort Stevens (Washington, D.C.); Battle of Charlestown; Battle of Opequon (Gilbert's Ford); 3rd Battle of Winchester (Opequon); Battle of Fisher's Hill; Battle of Cedar Creek; Siege of Petersburg; Third Battle of Petersburg

Commanders
- Colonel: Asa P. Blunt

Insignia
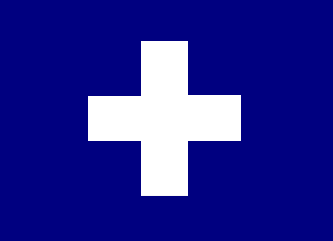
- 2nd Brigade (Vermont Brigade), 2nd Division, VI Corps (Union Army), Army of the Potomac/Army of the Shenandoah (Union)

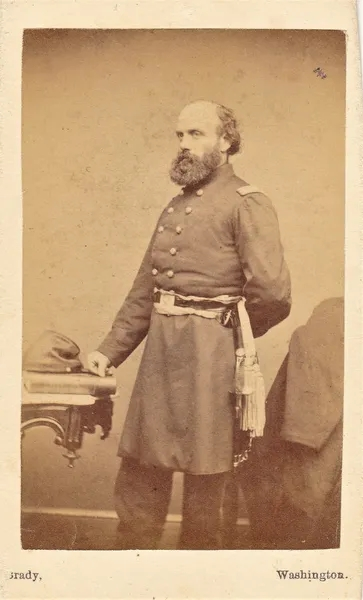
Colonel Nathan Lord, Jr.

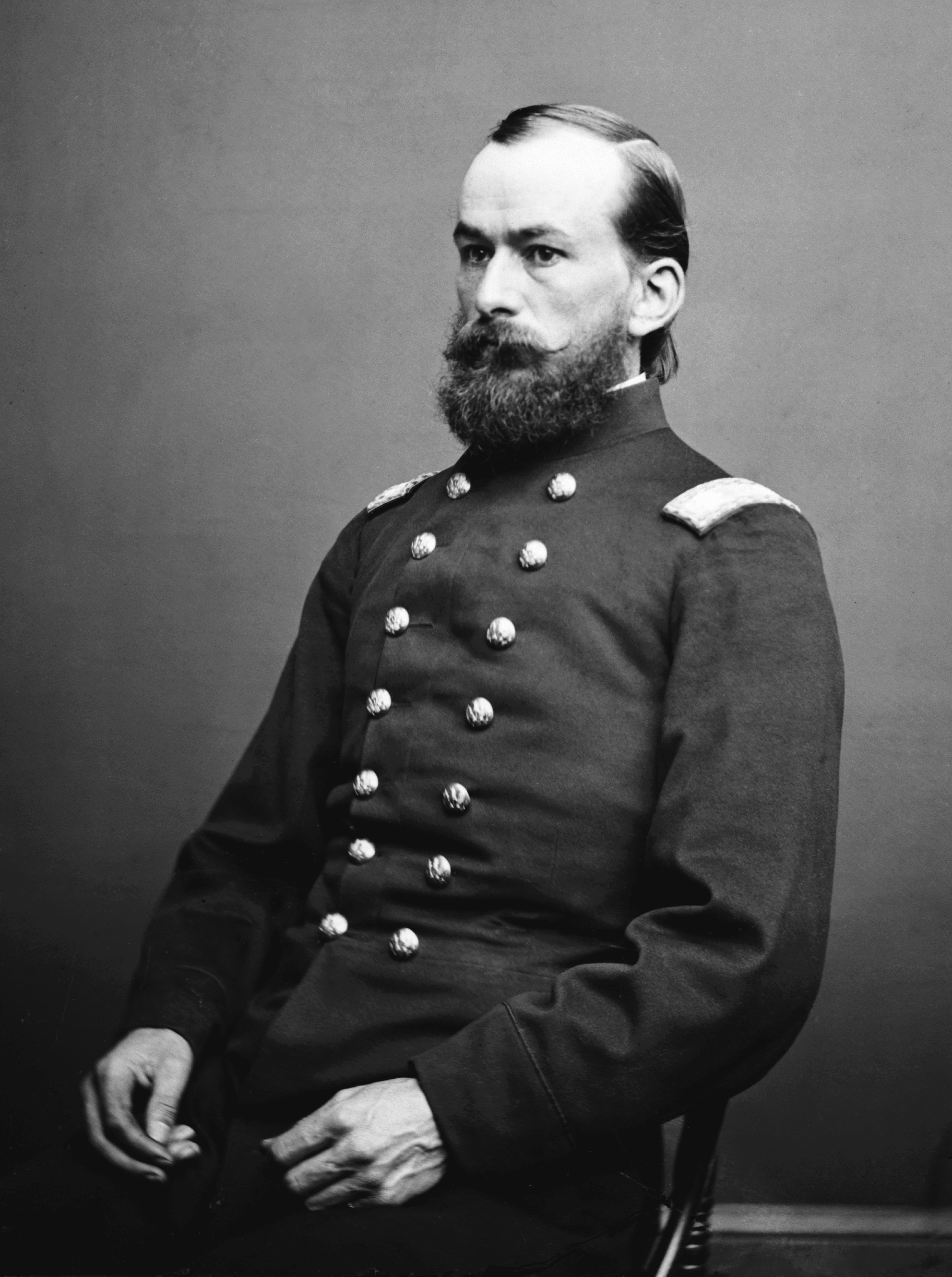
Asa P. Blunt commanded in 1861

The 6th Vermont Infantry Regiment was a three years' infantry regiment in the Union Army during the American Civil War. Organized at Montpelier and mustered in October 15, it served in the Army of the Potomac (AoP). It departed Vermont for Washington, DC, October 19, 1861. It served in the Eastern Theater, predominantly in the VI Corps, AoP, from October 1861 to June 1865. It was a part of the Vermont Brigade.

== Service ==
The 6th, recruited from the state at large, was mustered into the U. S. service for three years under Colonel Nathan Lord, Jr., the son of the Dartmouth College president Nathan Lord, at Montpelier, October 15, 1861, and immediately ordered to Washington, where it arrived on October 22.

It proceeded at once to Camp Griffin, where it was attached to the Vermont brigade under the command of was Brig. Gen. William T. H. Brooks. (Note: The First Vermont Brigade was organized in October 1861, primarily through the efforts of Maj. Gen. William F. "Baldy" Smith. It was composed of the 2nd, 3rd, 4th, 5th and 6th Vermont regiments, which had been individually mustered into service between June and September, for a time, it also included the 26th New Jersey Infantry. Its first commander was Brig. Gen. Brooks.) The command remained at this post during the winter and broke camp on March 10, 1862, for George B. McClellan's Peninsula Campaign.

In this campaign, the brigade was incorporated into the Army of the Potomac as the 2nd Brigade, 2nd Division, VI Corps. On April 6, 1862, at Warwick Creek., the regiment was first in action and had no casualties. The 6th fought at Golding's Farm, and received praise from Brig. Gen. Hancock for their performance. At Savage Station, they suffered severe losses. The regiment remained with its brigade and corps through the end of the campaign.

Leaving the Peninsula, the regiment was busy in the Maryland campaign. It fought Gen. Lee's Army of Northern Virginia (ANV) at Crampton's Gap and Antietam. After the relief of McClellan, Burnside moved the regiment and brigade to Falmouth. It fought at Fredericksburg and took part in the failed assault on Maryes Heights.

After the battle, it went into winter quarters at White Oak Church, where it remained, with the exception of the "Mud March," until camp was broken for the Chancellorsville movement in the end of April 1863. During the winter, the regiment received a new brigade commander, Brig. Gen. Lewis A. Grant, (Note: Grant, A Medal of Honor recipient, had previously commanded the 5th Vermont.). Under Grant's brigade command, the 6th fought in the Chancellorsville campaign culminating in the Battle of Chancellorsville. Operating as part of Maj. Gen. John Sedgwick's force opposite Fredericksburg. On May 2, the U.S. forces there had broken through the Confederate lines. The 6th participated in the capture of Marye's Heights in the Second Battle of Fredericksburg and then were prominent in the fighting at Salem Church.

Like most of VI Corps, the regiment and its brigade were held in reserve during the Battle of Gettysburg, holding a flank guard position behind Big Round Top, losing only one man wounded. After the Gettysburg campaign, the 6th saw elements of their brigade were sent to help quell the draft riots in New York City while they remained in Virginia, fighting at Funkstown later in the summer. Like its brigade mates, the 6th proved itself as a steady and reliable unit.

After fighting in the Bristoe and Mine Run campaigns in the fall, the 6th regrouped. It went into winter camp at Brandy Station, until the opening of Overland Campaign in the spring of 1864. Its depleted brigade received reinforcements in May 1864 when the 11th Vermont Infantry was assigned to the organization. (Note: The regiment would actually join them between the Wilderness and Spotsylvania. That same month, the Army of the Potomac, under the overall supervision of Lt. Gen. Ulysses S. Grant, began its spring offensive (the Overland Campaign) towards Richmond. The Vermont Brigade mustered approximately 2,850 soldiers at the start of the campaign.)

In this campaign the 6th Vermont played important roles and suffered great casualties. They were heavily engaged in the Wilderness where the fighting was arduous. On the morning of Thursday, May 5, 1864, the U.S. army attacked Lee's army at the Battle of the Wilderness. While the initial Union attack was successful, rough terrain and stubborn resistance ground down the attack. By midday, A.P. Hill's Corps had come up and was attacking the weak Union center along the Orange Plank Road. Maj. Gen. George W. Getty's brigades were ordered by Maj. Gen. Winfield S. Hancock to hold the road and counterattack. As part of the Vermont Brigade, the 6th took the southern flank and charged the advancing Confederates. Ordered to retreat, the 6th and its brigade were given time to fall back to new breastworks by an opportune bayonet charge by the 5th Vermont. The Confederates continued to attack until the Union line was stabilized. Losses in its the brigade totaled 1,269 killed, wounded, and missing in less than 12 hours of fighting.

After the Wilderness, over the weekend of 7–8 May, the U.S. forces moved south to Spotsylvania Court House, where Lee's army had entrenched. The 11th Vermont joined the brigade at this point. The regiment lost its corps commander, Sedgwick, on the first day of battle, Monday. Early in the battle, on May 9, the brigade, defending barricades forward of the rest of the Union Army, were ordered to retreat and spike their supporting artillery field pieces before the Confederates overran them. Disobeying orders, Grant ordered the guns to be "spiked with canister," and the brigade was able to defend the guns and works successfully until reinforcements arrived to stabilize the position. The Vermonters suffered heavily during the ensuing assault on the Confederate defenses.

The next day, Tuesday, May 10, the 6th Vermont was within the brigade as it led Upton's successful late afternoon assault on the west side of the "Mule Shoe Salient", a protruding network of trenches in the center of the Confederate lines. (Note: At around 6 p.m., the VI Corps began its attack with an unusual formation. Col. Upton led a group of 12 hand-picked regiments, about 5,000 men in four battle lines, against an identified weak point on the west side of the Mule Shoe called Doles's Salient (named after Brig. Gen. George P. Doles's Georgian troops who were manning that sector of the line). The plan was for Upton's men to rush across the open field without pausing to fire and reload, reaching the earthworks before the Confederates could fire more than a couple of shots.)

The final battle of the Overland Campaign was the Battle of Cold Harbor where the 6th was repeatedly in action. Its brigade was one of the units selected to charge Confederate earthworks on Wednesday, June 1, 1864. Grant's attack failed and he suffered heavy losses. In less than 10 minutes, hundreds of soldiers from the Vermont Brigade were killed or wounded. The brigade, in less than one month of fighting, had been reduced from 2,850 men to less than 1,200.

While the AoP and the ANV dug in at Petersburg, Lee sent Lt. Gen. Early on a mission through the Shenandoah Valley to the outskirts of Washington, D.C. In response, the VI Corps was sent to stop him at Fort Stevens. After this, the 6th fought in the Valley Campaign against Early, under the overall command of Maj. Gen. Philip Sheridan. The regiment moved southward as the army won victories at Winchester and Fisher's Hill.

On Wednesday, October 19, At the Cedar Creek, Early launched a surprise attack against Sheridan's army and the regiment, and its brigade covered the Union army's temporary retreat, prior to Sheridan's counterattack and decisive victory. Grant was promoted to command the 2nd Division, VI Corps, during the later stages of this action, when Getty became acting corps commander. Col. George P. Foster led the brigade while Grant was in command of the division. The 6th was in the center of the division's line until the entire formation retreated in good order. At one point an adjoining commander told his men not to fall back until the Vermonters Brigade did so.

After the battle, the 6th took part in the destruction of the valley as a source for sustenance for the Confederacy. The regiment remained on this duty in the Shenandoah until December. (Note: While with Sheridan, in October, the 6th mustered out the original members who not reenlisted, and the veterans and recruits consolidated into a battalion of six companies.)

Returning to the AoP in December, it re-entered the siege lines around Petersburg. The 6th Vermont remained in the entrenchments over the winter. In the final phase of the siege, the 6th was in the van of the First Vermont Brigade's successful break-through attack on the earthworks defending the city, on Monday morning of April 2, 1865. Lewis Grant was wounded in this action and briefly relinquished command. After the surrender of Lee's army on Sunday, April 9, the 6th Vermont took up the initial occupation duties in and around Richmond.

It later participated in the victory parade in Washington on Thursday, June 8, 1865. It mustered out three weeks later, on June 29, 1865 in Washington, and the men returned home to Vermont. At home, many former members of the regiment joined fraternal veterans organizations such as the Grand Army of the Republic and the Military Order of the Loyal Legion of the United States to enact legislation to support veterans and their families, often and held reunions recount their service in the 6th Vermont Infantry.

== Companies ==
=== Company D ===
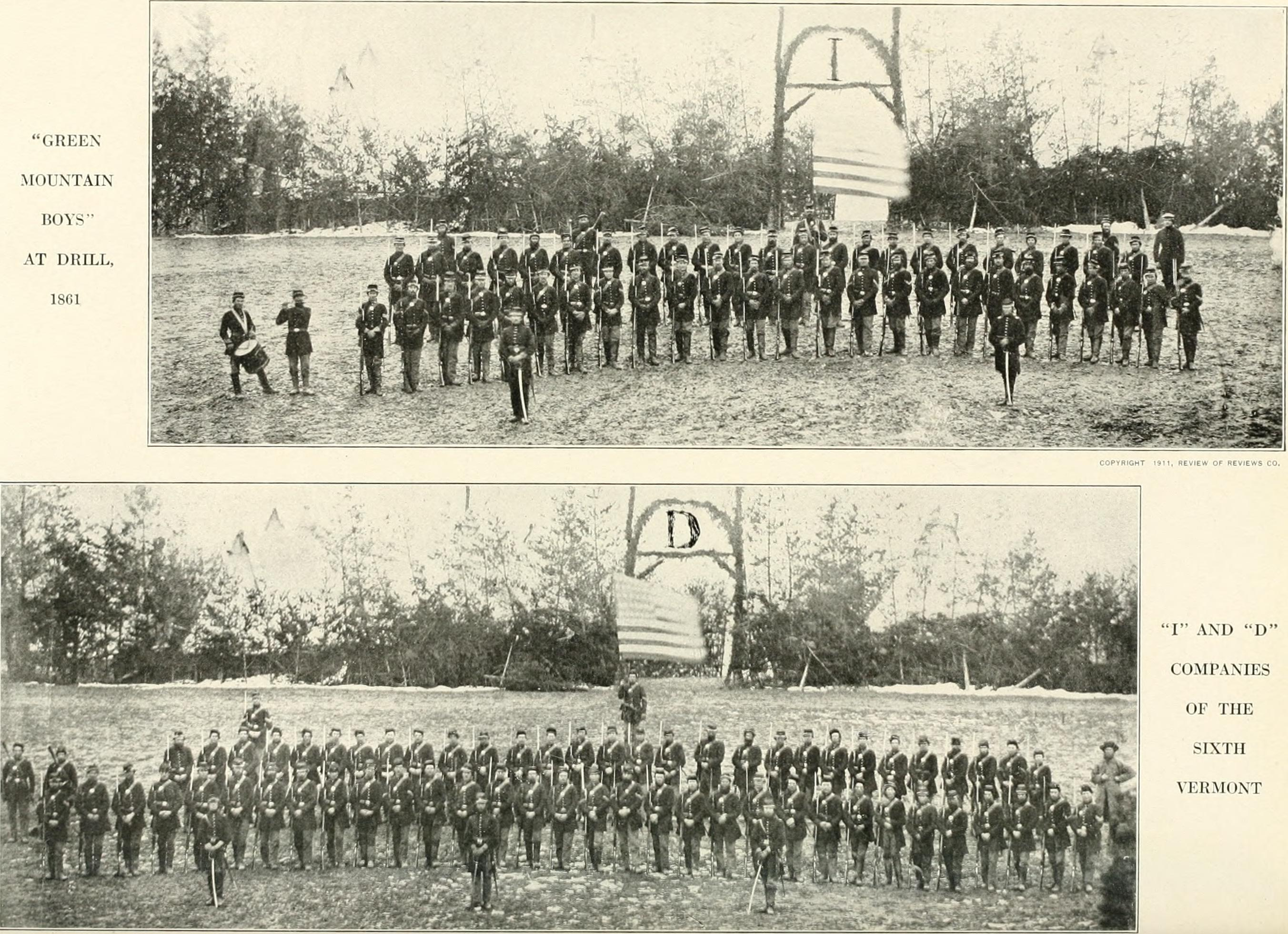
Company "D" of the 6th Vermont at drill, 1861.

=== Company I ===
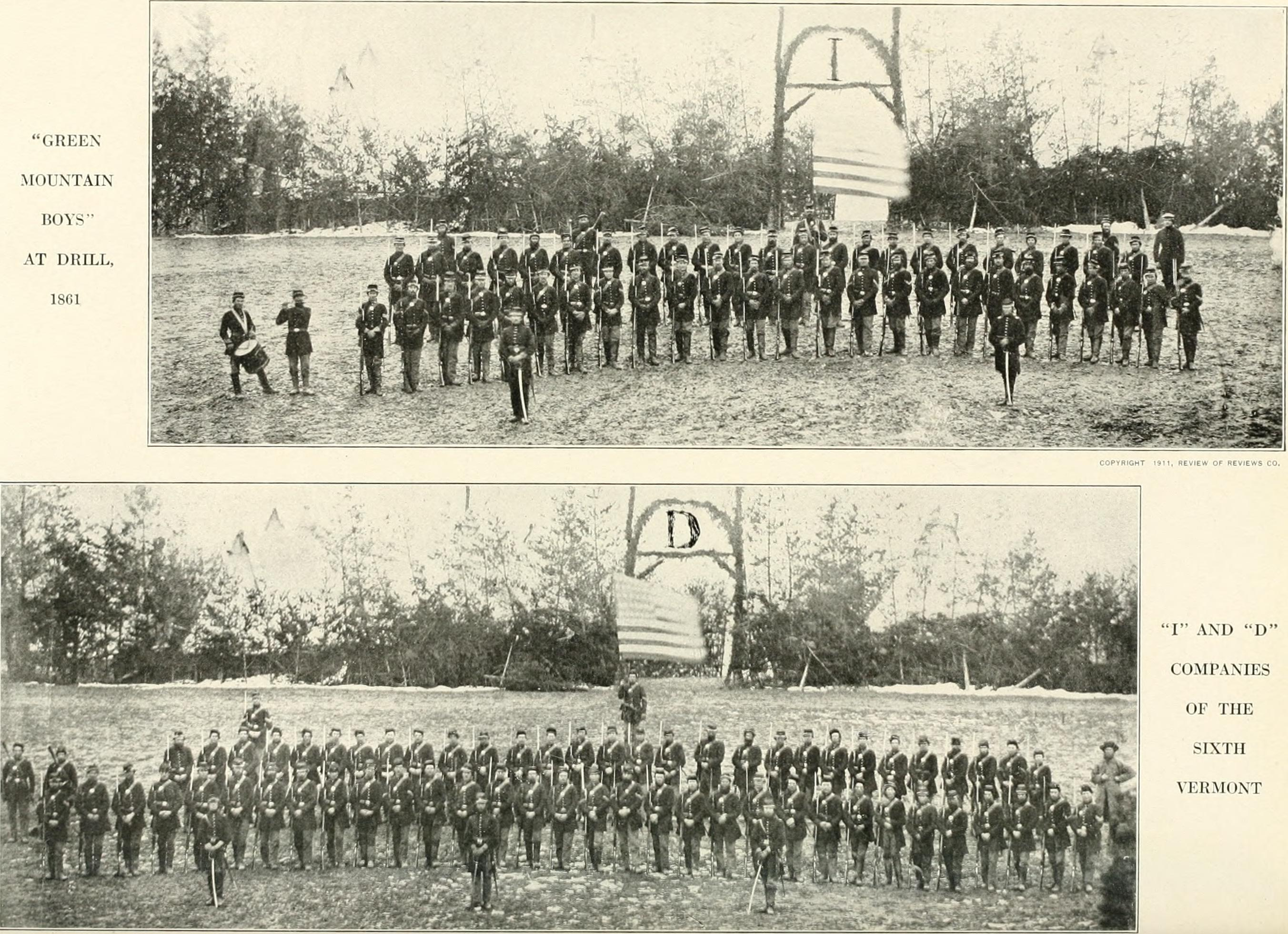
Company "I" of the 6th Vermont at drill, 1861.

== Regimental staff ==
Through its service, the commanders were:

- Colonels— Nathan Lord, Jr., Oscar S. Tuttle, Elisha L. Barney, Sumner H. Lincoln

The staff officers were:

- Lieutenant Colonels— Asa P. Blunt, Oscar S. Tuttle, Elisha L. Barney, Oscar A. Hale, Frank G. Butterfield, Sumner H. Lincoln, William J. Sperry
- Majors—O scar S. Tuttle, Elisha L. Barney, Oscar Hale, Richard B. Crandall, Carlos W. Dwinell, Sumner H. Lincoln, William J. Sperry, Edwin R. Kinney.

== Affiliations, battle honors, detailed service, and casualties ==
=== Organizational affiliation ===
Its assignments are as follows:

- Attached to Brook's Brigade, Smith's Division, AoP, to March, 1862
- 2nd Brigade, 2nd Division, IV Corps, AoP, to May, 1862
- 2nd Brigade, 2nd Division, VI Corps, AoP, to August, 1863
- Provost of New York City, August to September, 1863
- 2nd Brigade, 2nd Division, VI Corps, AoP, to August, 1864
- 2nd Brigade, 2nd Division, VI Corps, Army of the Shenandoah, Middle Military Division, to December 1864
- 2nd Brigade, 2nd Division, VI Corps, AoP, to June 1865

=== List of battles ===
The official list of battles in which the regiment bore a part:

- Battle at Lee's Mills, April 16, 1862
- Battle of Williamsburg; May 5, 1862
- Battle of Garnett's & Golding's Farm; June 26, 1862
- Battle of Savage's Station; June 29, 1862
- Battle of White Oak Swamp; June 30, 1862
- Battle of Crampton's Gap; September 14, 1862
- Battle of Antietam; September 17, 1862
- Battle of Fredericksburg; December 13, 1862
- Battle of Marye's Heights; May 3, 1863
- Battle of Salem Church; May 4, 1863
- Second Battle of Fredericksburg; June 5, 1863
- Battle of Gettysburg; July 3, 1863
- Battle of Funkstown; July 10, 1863
- Second Battle of Rappahannock Station; November 7, 1863
- Battle of the Wilderness; May 5–10, 1864
- Battle of Spotsylvania; May 10–18, 1864
- Battle of Cold Harbor; June 1–12, 1864
- Second Battle of Petersburg; June 18, 1864
- Battle of Reams' Station; June 29, 1864
- Fort Stevens (Washington, D.C.); July 11, 1864
- Battle of Charlestown; August 21, 1864
- Battle of Opequon (Gilbert's Ford) September 13, 1864
- 3rd Battle of Winchester (Opequon); September 19, 1864
- Battle of Fisher's Hill; September 21–22, 1864
- Battle of Cedar Creek; October 19, 1864
- Siege of Petersburg; March 25, 1865
- Third Battle of Petersburg April 2, 1865

=== Detailed service ===
==== 1861 ====
- At Camp Griffin, Defenses of Washington till March 10, 1862

==== 1862 ====
- Moved to Alexandria, VA March 10
- The Peninsula Campaign, March 17-July 3, 1862
  - To Fortress Monroe, VA March 23–24
  - Reconnaissance to Warwick River March 30
  - Young's Mills April 4
  - Siege of Yorktown April 5-May 4
  - Lee's Mills April 16
  - Battle of Williamsburg May 5
  - The Seven Days Battles June 25-July 1
    - Garnett's Farm June 27
    - Savage Station June 29
    - White Oak Swamp Bridge June 30
    - Malvern Hill July 1
- At Harrison's Landing till August 16
- Moved to Fortress Monroe, thence to Alexandria, August 16–24
- The Maryland Campaign September 4–20,
  - Crampton's Pass, September 14
  - Battle of Antietam September 16–17
- At Hagerstown, MD, September 26- October 29
- Movement to Falmouth, VA, October 29- November 19
- Battle of Fredericksburg December 12–15

==== 1863 ====
- Burnside's Second Campaign, Mud March, January 20–24
- The Chancellorsville Campaign April 27- May 6
  - Operations at Franklin's Crossing April 29-May 2
  - Maryes Heights, Fredericksburg, May 3
  - Salem Heights lay 3-4
  - Banks' Ford May 4
- Franklin's Crossing June 5–12
- Battle of Gettysburg, PA, July 2–4
- Funkstown, MD, July 10–13
- Detached from Army for duty at New York City and Kingston, NY, August 14- September 16
- Rejoined army at Culpeper Court House, VA, September 23
- The Bristoe Campaign October 9–22
- Advance to line of the Rappahannock, November 7–8
- Rappahannock Station, November 7
- The Mine Run Campaign November 26-December 2

==== 1864 ====
- The Overland Campaign May 12-June 24
  - The Battle of the Wilderness May 5–7
  - Battle of Spotsylvania May 8–12
  - Spottsylvania Court House May 12–21
  - Assault on the Salient, Spottsylvania Court House, May 12
  - North Anna River May 23–26
  - Line of the Pamunkey May 26-23
  - Totopotomoy May 28–31.
  - Battle of Cold Harbor June 1–12
  - Before Petersburg June 18–19
  - Jerusalem Plank Road June 22–23
- Siege of Petersburg till July 9
- Moved to Washington, D. C., July 3–11
- Repulse of Early's attack on Washington, DC, July 11–12
  - Battle of Fort Stevens July 11
- Sheridan's Shenandoah Valley Campaign August 7- November 21
  - Near Charlestown August 21–22
  - Gilbert's Ford, Opequan Creek, September 13
  - Battle of Opequan (Third Winchester), September 19
  - Fisher's Hill September 22
  - Battle of Cedar Creek October 19
- At Strasburg till November 9
- At Kernstown till December 9
- Moved to Petersburg, December 9–12
- Siege of Petersburg December 13, 1864, to April 2, 1865

==== 1865 ====
- Before Petersburg, March 25, 1865
  - The Appomattox Campaign March 28-April 9
  - Assault on and fall of Petersburg April 2
  - Sailor's Creek April 6
  - Appomattox Court House April 9
  - Surrender of Lee and his army
- At Farmville and Burkesville Station till April 23
- March to Danville April 23–27, and duty there till May 18
- Moved to Manchester, thence march to Washington, D. C., May 24-June 8
- Corps Review June 8
- Mustered out June 26, 1865.

=== Casualties and total strength ===
The 6th Vermont's original strength was 966. It gained 715 men between 1861-1865 as recruits and transfers. Regiment lost during service 11 officers and 191 enlisted men killed and mortally wounded and 3 officers and 212 enlisted by disease. Total 418. (Note: The regiment lost 129 KIA, 60 mortally wounded, 189 dead of disease, 20 dead in Confederate prisons, and 2 dead from accident.) Over the course of their service the regiment saw 19 promoted to other regiments, 440 honorably discharged, 8 dishonorably discharged, 66 deserted, and 6 missing in action. During its service, 126 of the men transferred to the Veteran Reserve Corps and other organizations. The 5th had 616 men muster out at various times, 132 taken prisoner, and 449 wounded.

== See also ==
- Vermont in the Civil War
- Vermont Brigade
