= First Battle of Winchester order of battle =

The order of battle for the First Battle of Winchester includes:

- First Battle of Winchester order of battle: Confederate
- First Battle of Winchester order of battle: Union

== See also ==
- Battle of Winchester (disambiguation)
