= Winchester (disambiguation) =

Winchester is a historic city in southern England.

Winchester may also refer to:

== In Winchester, England ==
- Winchester (constituency)
- Winchester Cathedral
- Diocese of Winchester
- Bishop of Winchester
- Winchester College
- City of Winchester, the local government district containing Winchester
- University of Winchester

== Fictional characters ==
- Major Charles Emerson Winchester III, in the television series M*A*S*H
- Dean Winchester, in the television series Supernatural
- John Winchester (Supernatural), in the television series Supernatural
- Mary Winchester (Supernatural), in the television series Supernatural
- Sam Winchester, in the television series Supernatural

== People with the surname ==
- Henry of Winchester (1207–1271), who would become King Henry III of England
- Henry of Winchester (1101–1171), also known as Henry of Blois, the Bishop of Winchester
- Benjamin Winchester (1817–1901), early leader in the Latter Day Saint movement
- Boyd Winchester (1836–1923), US Representative from Kentucky
- Brad Winchester (born 1981) American professional ice hockey player
- Caleb Thomas Winchester (1847–1920), professor for English literature at Wesleyan University, Middletown, Connecticut
- Charles Alexander Winchester (?-1883) consul of the United Kingdom in Shanghai
- Colin Winchester (1933–1989), highest-ranking officer to be murdered in Australian policing history
- Elhanan Winchester (1751–1797), preacher
- Ernie Winchester (1944–2013), Scottish footballer
- Ian Winchester (born 1973), discus thrower from New Zealand
- Jack Winchester (disambiguation)
- Jesse Winchester (1944–2014), stage name of musician James Ridout Winchester
- Jesse Winchester (ice hockey) (born 1983), Canadian professional ice hockey player
- John de Winchester (d. 1460), bishop of Moray
- Jude Winchester, Northern Irish footballer
- Mary Winchester (Zoluti) (1865–1955), English girl kidnapped by Mizos
- Olive Winchester (1879–1947), pioneer biblical scholar and theologian in the Church of the Nazarene
- Oliver Winchester (1810–1880), largest stockholder of the Winchester Repeating Arms Company
- Philip Winchester, American actor
- Sarah Winchester (1837–1922), wife of William Winchester and builder of the Winchester Mystery House
- Scott Winchester (born 1973), American former Major League Baseball player
- Shurwayne Winchester (born 1974), soca artist from Trinidad and Tobago
- Simon Winchester (1944–2026), author and journalist
- William Wirt Winchester (1838–1881), son of Oliver Winchester

== Places ==
=== United States ===
- Winchester, Arkansas
- Winchester, California
- Winchester (San Jose), a neighborhood of San Jose, California
- Winchester Transit Center, a light rail station in Campbell, California
- Winchester, Connecticut
- Winchester, Georgia
- Winchester, Idaho
- Winchester, Illinois
- Winchester, Indiana
- Winchester, Iowa
- Winchester, Kansas
- Winchester, Kentucky
- Winchester-on-the-Severn, Maryland
- Winchester, Massachusetts
- Winchester, Michigan
- Winchester, Mississippi
- Winchester, Missouri
- Winchester, Clark County, Missouri
- Winchester, Nevada
- Winchester, New Hampshire, a New England town
  - Winchester (CDP), New Hampshire, the main village in the town
- Winchester, Adams County, Ohio
- Winchester, Jackson County, Ohio
- Winchester, Richland County, Ohio
- Winchester, Oklahoma
- Winchester, Woods County, Oklahoma
- Winchester, Oregon
- Winchester, Tennessee
- Winchester, Texas
- Winchester, Virginia
- Winchester, Grant County, Washington, an unincorporated community
- Winchester, Vilas County, Wisconsin, a town
  - Winchester (community), Vilas County, Wisconsin, unincorporated community within the town
- Winchester, Winnebago County, Wisconsin, a town
- Winchester, Wyoming

=== Elsewhere ===
- 747 Winchester, an asteroid
- Winchester, Ontario, Canada
- Winchester, New Zealand
- Municipality of Deloraine-Winchester, Manitoba, Canada
- Rural Municipality of Winchester, Manitoba, now incorporated into Deloraine-Winchester

== Computers and software ==
- Winchester, code name for an Athlon 64 processor model
- Winchester disk, a once-common generic name for hard disks, from the code name for the early IBM 3340 storage system
- Winchester connector, a connector for wideband modems located on layer 1 on the OSI model, specified in the ITU-T Recommendation V.35 standard and later in Rec. V.11

== Entertainment ==
- The Winchesters, an American fantasy television series, spin-off of the WB/CW show Supernatural
- The Winchester, a fictional English pub in the movie Shaun of the Dead
- Winchester '73, an American Western movie released in 1950 starring James Stewart, remade as a made-for-TV film in 1967
- Winchester (film), a 2018 American horror film

== Firearms ==
- Winchester Repeating Arms Company, manufacturer of Winchester firearms
  - Winchester rifle, a lever-action rifle popular in the US since the mid-19th century
  - 9×23mm Winchester, a centerfire pistol cartridge (introduced c. 1996)

== Vessels ==
- HMS Winchester, a name used seven times for Royal Navy warships from 1693–1946
- USS Winchester (SP-156), a US Navy patrol vessel in commission from 1917–1919
- Winchester, the class name for the military BHC SR.N6

== Weights and measures ==
- Winchester measure, an archaic set of weights and measures
- Winchester quart, an archaic measure of volume

== Other uses ==
- Book of Winchester (also known as the Domesday Book), the record of the great survey of England completed in 1086 for William I
- Fort Winchester, an American military fortification c. 1812 in northwest Ohio
- Winchester (bottle), used in laboratories for the storage of corrosive chemicals
- Winchester Mystery House, a well-known mansion in San Jose, California, US
- The Winchester, Highgate, a London pub, England, UK
- WINCHESTER, a multi-service tactical brevity code procedure word meaning "No ordnance remaining"
