= Presque Isle, Wisconsin =

Town of Presque Isle
- Town
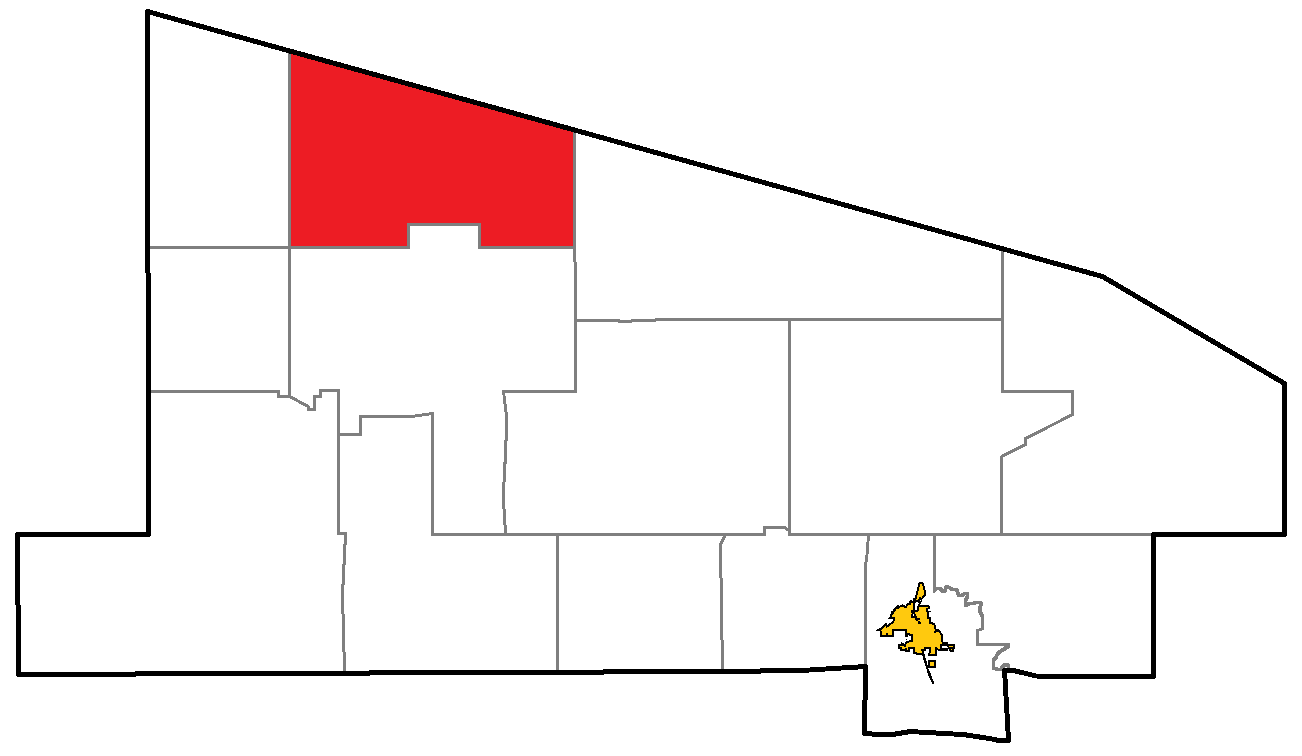
- Location of the Town of Presque Isle, within Vilas County
- Coordinates: 46°12′49″N 89°42′4″W
- Country: United States
- State: Wisconsin
- County: Vilas

Government
  - Town Chairman: John MacLean
  - Supervisor: Cathy Logan Weber
  - Supervisor: Carl Wolter

Area
  - Total: 74.4 sq mi (192.8 km^{2})
  - Land: 61.7 sq mi (159.8 km^{2})
  - Water: 12.7 sq mi (33.0 km^{2})
- Elevation: 1,680 ft (512 m)

Population (2020)
  - Total: 805
  - Density: 13.0/sq mi (5.04/km^{2})
- Time zone: UTC-6 (Central (CST))
  - Summer (DST): UTC-5 (CDT)
- Area codes: 715 & 534
- FIPS code: 55-65425
- GNIS feature ID: 1583981
- Website: https://presqueislewi.gov/

The Town of Presque Isle is located in Vilas County, Wisconsin, United States. The population was reported by the 2020 Census to be 805. The unincorporated communities of Presque Isle and Katinka Village are located in the town.

== Name ==
The name is a respelling of the French word presqu'île or presque-isle, which means a peninsula or other geographic feature that is, literally, almost an island.

== Geography ==
The Town of Presque Isle is located in northwestern Vilas County in the Lake Superior snowbelt region. The area contains many lakes, such as the Presque Isle Lake and the headwaters of the Presque Isle River. According to the United States Census Bureau, the town has a total area of 74.4 square miles (192.8 km^{2}), of which 61.7 square miles (159.8 km^{2}) is land and 12.7 square miles (33.0 km^{2}) (17.10%) is water.

== Demographics ==
As of the census of 2000, there were 513 people, 241 households, and 176 families residing in the town. The population density was 8.3 people per square mile (3.2/km^{2}). There were 1,216 housing units at an average density of 19.7 per square mile (7.6/km^{2}). The racial makeup of the town was 99.81% White and 0.19% Asian. Hispanic or Latino of any race were 0.58% of the population.

There were 241 households, out of which 15.4% had children under the age of 18 living with them, 69.3% were married couples living together, 2.9% had a female householder with no husband present, and 26.6% were non-families. 20.7% of all households were made up of individuals, and 11.6% had someone living alone who was 65 years of age or older. The average household size was 2.13 and the average family size was 2.42.

In the town, the population was spread out, with 13.8% under the age of 18, 1.9% from 18 to 24, 16.8% from 25 to 44, 36.5% from 45 to 64, and 31.0% who were 65 years of age or older. The median age was 56 years. For every 100 females, there were 101.2 males. For every 100 females age 18 and over, there were 103.7 males.

The median income for a household in the town was $41,250, and the median income for a family was $43,438. Males had a median income of $35,000 versus $29,000 for females. The per capita income for the town was $25,798. About 5.7% of families and 9.4% of the population were below the poverty line, including 23.4% of those under age 18 and 3.2% of those age 65 or over.

== Government ==
The town is represented by a Town Chairman and two Town Supervisors. It is located in Vilas County Supervisory District 2, Wisconsin State Assembly District 34, Wisconsin Senate District 12, and Wisconsin's Seventh Congressional District. The Presque Isle Community Center, Presque Isle Community Library, and Presque Isle Volunteer Fire Department are located in the unincorporated community of Presque Isle.

== Transportation ==
The town is served by four Vilas County Trunk Highways. CTH W leads west and south through Winchester and Manitowish Waters to a connection with USH 51. CTH B runs east–west through the town and connects with M-64 approximately 1 mile (1.6 km) north of the village of Presque Isle; to the east it connects with USH 45 and STH 32 at Land o' Lakes. CTH P serves the western part of the town and provides access to North Lakeland Elementary School. CTH M begins at a junction with CTH B near Natural Lakes Private Preserve in the eastern part of the town, and provides access to Boulder Junction and eventually U.S. 51.
