= First Battle of Winchester order of battle: Union =

The following United States Army units and commanders fought in the First Battle of Winchester (May 25, 1862) of the American Civil War. The Confederate order of battle is listed separately.

== Abbreviations used ==
=== Military rank ===
- MG = Major General
- BG = Brigadier General
- Col = Colonel
- Ltc = Lieutenant Colonel
- Cpt = Captain
- Lt = Lieutenant

=== Other ===
- c = captured

== Union Forces near Winchester ==
MG Nathaniel P. Banks

=== Department of the Shenandoah ===
MG Nathaniel P. Banks

Division	Brigade	Regiment or other
First Division; BG Alpheus S. Williams	First Brigade Col Dudley Donnelly	5th Connecticut: Ltc George D. Chapman; 28th New York: Ltc Edwin Franklin Brown; 46th Pennsylvania: Col Joseph F. Knipe
First Division; BG Alpheus S. Williams	Third Brigade Col George Henry Gordon	27th Indiana: Col Silas Colgrove; 2nd Massachusetts: Ltc George L. Andrews; 29th Pennsylvania: Col John K. Murphy (c), Cpt Samuel M. Zulich; 3rd Wisconsin: Col Thomas H. Ruger
First Division; BG Alpheus S. Williams	Cavalry Attachment	1st Michigan Cavalry (5 companies): Col Thornton F. Brodhead, Maj Angelo Paldi
First Division; BG Alpheus S. Williams	Artillery Attachment Cpt Robert B. Hampton	Battery M, 1st New York Light Artillery: Lt James H. Peabody; Battery F, Pennsylvania Light Artillery: Lt J. Presley Fleming; Battery F, 4th U.S. Artillery: Lt Franklin B. Crosby
Attached independent units
Attached independent units	Cavalry Brigade BG John P. Hatch	1st Maine Cavalry (2nd Battalion): Ltc Calvin S. Douty; 1st Maryland Cavalry (5 companies): Ltc Charles Wetschky; 5th New York Cavalry: Col Othneil De Forest; 1st Vermont Cavalry: Col Charles H. Tompkins
Attached independent units	Various Units BG John W. Geary	10th Maine: Col George L. Beal; 8th New York Cavalry (5 companies, dismounted): Ltc Charles R. Babbitt; Pennsylvania Zouaves d'Afrique: Cpt Charles H. T. Collis; Battery E, Pennsylvania Light Artillery: Lt Charles A. Atwell
