= Winchester railway station (disambiguation) =

Winchester railway station is a railway station in Winchester, Hampshire, England.

Winchester railway station may also refer to:

- Winchester Transit Center, in Campbell, California, United States
- Winchester railway station (Didcot, Newbury and Southampton Railway), a former railway station in Winchester, Hampshire, England
- Winchester Center station in Massachusetts, United States

== See also ==
- Winchester (disambiguation)
