= Third Battle of Winchester order of battle =

The order of battle for the Third Battle of Winchester (also known as the Battle of Opequon or Battle of Opequon Creek) includes:

- Third Battle of Winchester order of battle: Confederate
- Third Battle of Winchester order of battle: Union

== See also ==
- Battle of Winchester (disambiguation)
