= Second Battle of Winchester order of battle =

Order of battle for 1863 American Civil War battle

The order of battle for the Second Battle of Winchester includes:

- Second Battle of Winchester order of battle: Confederate
- Second Battle of Winchester order of battle: Union

== See also ==
- Battle of Winchester (disambiguation)
