= Bridget Diver =

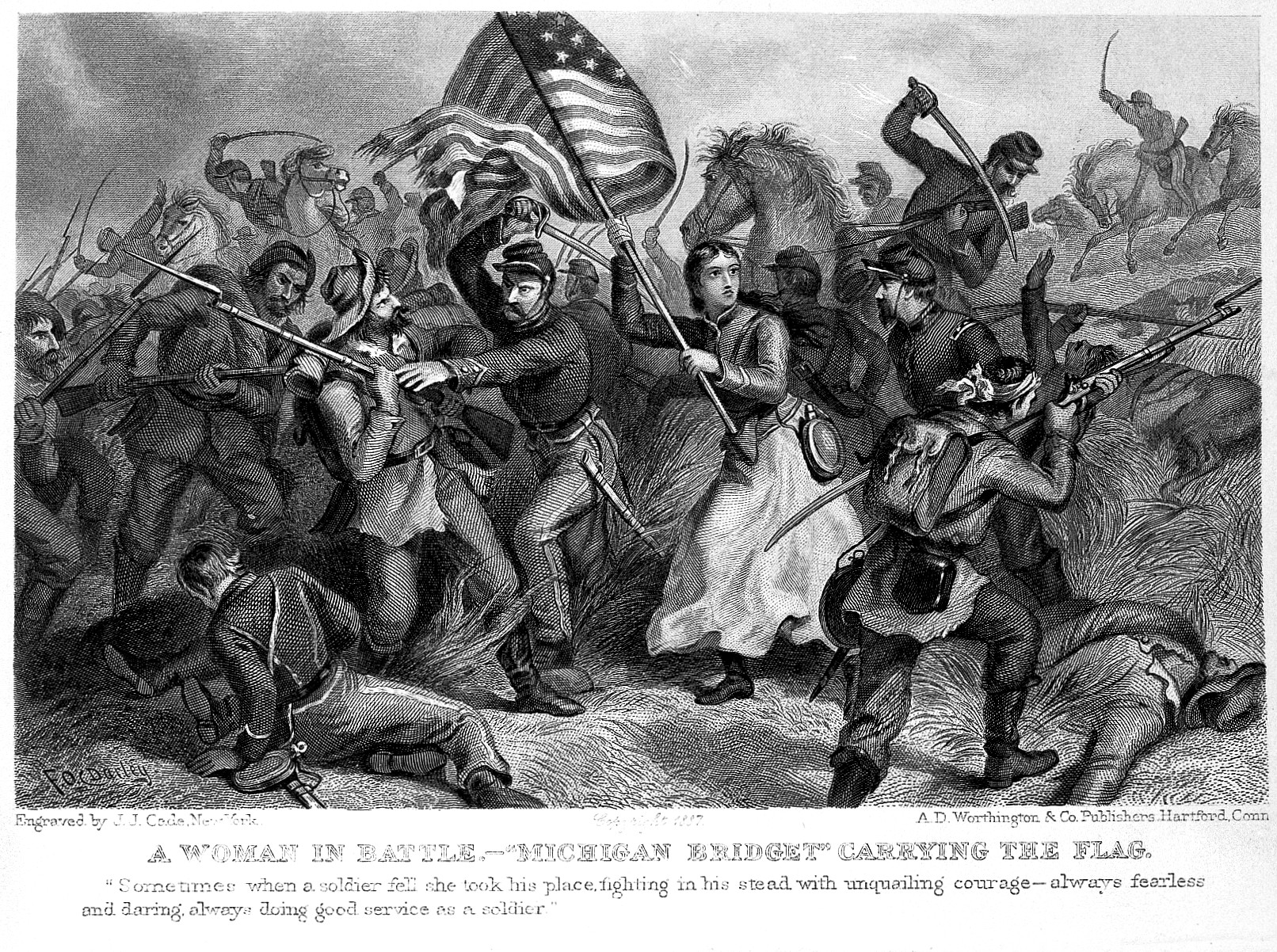
Illustration of "Michigan Bridget" from Mary A. Livermore, My story of the war : a woman's narrative of four years personal experience as nurse in the Union army, and in relief work at home, in hospitals, camps, and at the front, during the war of the rebellion (1890).

Bridget Divers or Michigan Bridget was an Irish immigrant who rode with the First Michigan Cavalry during the American Civil War. Variations of her surname include Diver, Divers, Deaver, Deavers, Devens, Devins and Devan; and she was known as "Irish Biddy" to Sheridan's men. Unfortunately, none of the accounts of her combat activities come from a verifiable eye-witness. Much of the literature from the middle of the 19th century is written in an idealized and highly stylized form, conforming to the standards of propriety in that era. Nonetheless, careful analysis of surviving records show Michigan Bridget to have been a real person, after removing the almost mythological language frequently used to describe her exploits.

== Historical records ==
=== Letter of Rebecca Usher ===
At the very end of the war, a letter written by Rebecca Usher to her home in Maine stated that "A few days ago I saw Bridget, who came out with the First Michigan Cavalry, and has been with the regiment ever since. She had just come in with the body of a captain who was killed in a cavalry skirmish. She had the body lashed to her horse, and carried him fifteen miles, where she procured a coffin, and sent him home. She says that this is the hardest battle they have had, and the ground was covered with the wounded. She had not slept for 48 hours, having worked incessantly with the wounded. She is brave, heroic, and a perfect enthusiast in her work . . ."

Moore's book first mentions her as having been present at the Battle of Fair Oaks on 31 May 1862. This engagement took place immediately east of Richmond, Virginia. The same book declares that she was also present at the Battle of Cedar Creek, Virginia, which occurred 19 October 1864, in the Shenandoah Valley south of Winchester, Virginia. At Cedar Creek ". . . She found herself at one time cut off and surrounded by the enemy, but managed, by an adroit movement, to escape capture." Her presence at City Point, Virginia, in March 1865, has already been noted.

The historical record is consistent with much of the above letter by Rebecca Usher. The slain officer was Captain George C. Whitney of Hadley, Lapeer County, Michigan. He commanded Company B of the First Michigan Cavalry. He was severely wounded at the Battle of Five Forks near Petersburg, Virginia on 1 April 1865. His military record indicates that he died 4 April 1865 "on the road to the Cavalry Corps Hospital" at City Point, Virginia. His body was returned to Michigan and he was buried in the Hadley Cemetery.

=== Letter of Mrs. McKay ===
Mrs. C. E. McKay wrote "March 28 (1865) - Visited in company with Miss Bridget Deavers, two large camps of dismounted cavalrymen lying along the James River, a few miles from City Point. Bridget - or, as the men call her, Biddy, - has probably seen more of hardship and danger than any other woman during the war. She has been with the cavalry all the time, going out with them on their cavalry raids - always ready to succor the wounded on the field - often getting men off who, but for her, would be left to die, and, fearless of shell or bullet, among the last to leave."

=== Book by Mary Livermore ===
In 1890, Mary Livermore authored a book, My story of the war: a woman's narrative of four years personal experience as nurse in the Union army, containing a visual image of Bridget carrying the American flag, and leading cavalrymen into an engagement. The engraving was titled, A Woman in Battle - Michigan Bridget Carrying the Flag. At the time, Bridget clearly was associated with the 1st Michigan Volunteer Cavalry Regiment, her name was always spelled "Bridget Deavers" and she appeared to represent herself as unmarried.

== Her life ==
=== Early life ===
McKay mentions that "She is an Irish woman, has been in the country 16 years, and is now 26 years of age." This places her date of birth about 1839 and the year of her immigration around 1849. A detailed review of relevant immigration indexes reveals that a "Biddy Diver" arrived in Philadelphia on 14 July 1849 from County Londonderry, Ireland, aboard the ship Afton. She was described as 11 years old and no other Diver names appeared on the ship's passenger list. The surname Diver is found almost exclusively in County Donegal, Ireland, which borders on Londonderry. It seems likely that she was one of the large number of Irish immigrants who came to America as a result of the Great Famine. It is also true that there is no evidence that Bridget ever resided in Michigan.

=== Marriage ===
Although several sources state that her husband served as a private soldier in that regiment, an exhaustive study of the rolls of that organization, carried out at the Michigan State Archives, failed to turn up any man named Deaver, or any variant spelling. Examination of the rolls of the Fifth, Sixth, and Seventh Michigan Cavalry (other components of the Michigan Cavalry Brigade) produced similar results. Bridget could not have been married to a trooper from Michigan.

On the other hand, there is evidence that Bridget had at one time been married, just not to a man from Michigan. In reference #1 (above), Moore spoke again of Michigan Bridget: "The Battle of Fair Oaks commenced by a vigorous charge of an overwhelming rebel force upon a single division of McClellan's army, which had advanced across the Chickahominy. As Casey's Division, thus attacked, gave way, there was danger that the panic might spread and infect the troops that were hastening to the support. Among these was the Seventh Massachusetts, that, having advanced to within range of the rebel artillery, had just received the order 'forward', that would in a few moments plunge them into the heat of the contest. They obeyed the command but slowly, for the enemy's fire was growing every moment more terrific. Just then 'Irish Biddy" came along, supporting her husband, who had a ball through his leg.

At Fair Oaks she shouted "Arragh, go in, b'ys! Bate the bloody spalpeens, and revinge me husband and God be wid yez." This rallied the regiment and got the soldiers to advance again. At the Battle of Cedar Creek she was surrounded, but rode through the Confederates to safety. She used up eight to ten horses during the war and several times she had a horse shot from under her.

=== Combat experience ===
Divers was known for the level of care and concern she felt for soldiers in her regiment, for rallying the troops, and for having excellent horsemanship skills and enthusiasm. Divers was reportedly concerned with the moral and spiritual nature of her fellow troops and acted as their chaplain, receiving books and supplies from the Christian Commission. Divers acted in many capacities for her regiment, including as vivandière, nurse, hospital steward, and ward master; these duties gave her an extensive knowledge of the men serving in the regiment.

Divers also often participated in combat. According to Mary Livermore, "Sometimes when a soldier fell she took his place, fighting in his stead with unquailing courage. Sometimes she rallied retreating troops- sometimes she brought off the wounded from the field- always fearless and daring, always doing good service as a soldier." One of Divers's most famous moments of service occurred at the Battle of Fair Oaks, Virginia, in June 1862. Surprised by a Confederate attack, Divers was able to rally the troops to retaliate, successfully driving the Confederates back. Divers served essentially as a substitute soldier when her work was needed.

Bridget's actual combat experience probably ended in 1864 when General Grant banished women from military operations. She subsequently worked with the United States Sanitary Commission. Most of her time during the last year of the war was spent in the Cavalry Corps Hospital at City Point, Virginia. There she cared for wounded soldiers and was a tentmate of Cornelia Hancock, a famous Quaker hospital worker for the Union cause.

=== After the war ===
No one has presented convincing evidence of what Bridget did after the war. Reference #4 (above), declared that: "when the war ended, Bridget accompanied her regiment to Texas, from whence she returned with them to Michigan, but the attractions of army life were to strong to be overcome, and she has since joined one of the regiments of the regular army, stationed on the plains in the neighborhood of the Rocky Mountains." A slightly different picture is painted by Minnie Dubbs Millbrook who wrote that "Bridget went out to the western plains with her regiment after the war. She must have liked the life, for, after the First Michigan Cavalry was disbanded, she joined a Regular Army cavalry unit and continued in the West."

It seems likely that Bridget went to Washington, D. C. for the Grand Review of the troops which took place in late May 1865. Following this victory parade, most volunteer regiments went home, except for cavalry. Mounted forces had an important role to play on the frontier of the United States. In June 1865, General Custer took a number of volunteer and regular cavalry regiments to Texas in order to maintain order and guard against possible intrusion by Mexican soldiers during the unrest following the collapse of the southern Confederacy. However, no Michigan cavalry went with Custer on that expedition. On the other hand, the First Michigan Cavalry left in June that same year for service in the western territories. It traveled by way of Fort Leavenworth, Kansas, arriving finally in the fall at Camp Douglas, Utah Territory. This regiment was mustered out of Federal service at Camp Douglas in March 1866. The men received their final pay there, and most returned to Michigan.

Bridget's prior association with the 104th Pennsylvania Infantry suggests an early and continuing interest in the military, although not necessarily with any particular regiment. Therefore, she could have gone to Texas, but it seems more likely that she did go to Camp Douglas with the First Michigan Cavalry. Perhaps she remained in that region after the Michigan men left. Civilian records of Camp Douglas, from that time frame, are obviously less than complete, and Bridget's name did not appear in them. It is tempting to speculate that Colonel Maxwell may have known of Bridget's presence in the Salt Lake City region, and that he was influenced in his decision to move there before 1872.

Bridget learned that the army needed four laundresses per company for the American Indian Wars, generally wives of enlisted men. She spent the rest of her life in the army.

Divers reportedly stayed in the army after the Civil War to defend the Western frontier of the United States, potentially with her husband, though other accounts say he died in battle.
