= Frank G. Butterfield =

American Civil Wae soldier

- Born: May 11, 1842; Rockingham, Vermont
- Died: January 6, 1916 (aged 73); Derby Line, Vermont
- Burial place: Saxtons River Cemetery; Saxtons River, Vermont
- Military career
- Allegiance: United States of America
- Branch: United States Army
- Rank: First Lieutenant
- Unit: 6th Regiment Vermont Volunteer Infantry - Company C
- Awards: Medal of Honor

First Lieutenant Frank G. Butterfield (May 11, 1842 – January 6, 1916) was an American soldier who fought in the American Civil War. Butterfield received the country's highest award for bravery during combat, the Medal of Honor, for his action at Salem Heights, Virginia on May 4, 1863. He was honored with the award on May 4, 1891.

== Biography ==
Butterfield was born on May 11, 1842, in Rockingham, Vermont, and was pursuing law at the Middlebury College before the outbreak of the war. He enlisted into the 6th Vermont Infantry on October 4, 1861, at Middlebury. He earned the Medal of Honor for his actions at Salem Heights on May 4, 1863. He was later promoted to lieutenant-colonel on command of his regiment on October 21, 1864.

Following the war, he was a merchant operating on the Saxtons River and subsequently returned to school to complete his law qualifications. In 1880 and 1881, he was in charge of the tenth Vermont census; he led investigations into alleged census fraud in South Carolina and also assisted with the tenth Washington census. He then transferred to the Bureau of Pensions in 1882 and became chief of the special examination division in 1890. He resigned from public office in 1888 to pursue private business.

Butterfield died on January 6, 1916, at the age of 73 and would be buried in the Saxtons River Cemetery in Saxtons River, Vermont.

== Medal of Honor citation ==
Took command of the skirmish line and covered the movement of his regiment out of a precarious position.

== See also ==
- List of American Civil War Medal of Honor recipients: A–F

== See also ==
- Jacob G. Ullery (1894). Men of Vermont: An Illustrated Biographical History of Vermonters and Sons of Vermont. Brattleboro, VT: Transcript Publishing Company.
