= Jack Winchester =

Jack Winchester may refer to:

- Jack Winchester (ice hockey) (1879–1911)
- Jack Winchester (rugby league) (1918–1992)
- Jack Winchester (rugby union) (born 2000)
