= First Battle of Winchester order of battle: Confederate =

The following Confederate States Army units and commanders fought in the First Battle of Winchester of the American Civil War. The Union order of battle is listed separately.

== Abbreviations used ==
=== Military rank ===
- Gen = General
- LTG = Lieutenant General
- MG = Major General
- BG = Brigadier General
- Col = Colonel
- Ltc = Lieutenant Colonel
- Maj = Major
- Cpt = Captain
- Lt = Lieutenant
- Sgt = Sergeant

=== Other ===
- w = wounded
- mw = mortally wounded
- k = killed
- c = captured

== Department of the Valley ==
MG Thomas J. Jackson

=== Forces at Winchester ===
MG Thomas J. Jackson

| Division | Brigade | Regiment or other |
|---|---|---|
| Jackson's Division; MG Thomas J. Jackson | First (Stonewall) Brigade BG Charles S. Winder | 2nd Virginia Infantry - Col James W. Allen; 4th Virginia Infantry - Col Charles A. Ronald; 5th Virginia Infantry - Col William S. H. Baylor (w), Ltc John H. S. Funk; 27th Virginia Infantry - Col Andrew J. Grigsby; 33rd Virginia Infantry - Col John F. Neff |
| Jackson's Division; MG Thomas J. Jackson | Second (Campbell's) Brigade Col J.A. Campbell (w); Col John M. Patton | 21st Virginia Infantry – Col John M. Patton, Ltc Richard H. Cunningham; 42nd Virginia Infantry - Ltc William Martin; 48th Virginia Infantry – Ltc Thomas S. Garnett; 1st Virginia Battalion – Cap Benjamin W. Leigh |
| Jackson's Division; MG Thomas J. Jackson | Third (Taliaferro's) Brigade Col Samuel V. Fulkerson | 10th Virginia Infantry - Col Edwin T. H. Warren; 23rd Virginia Infantry - Col Alexander G. Taliaferro; 37th Virginia Infantry - Maj Titus V. Williams |
| Jackson's Division; MG Thomas J. Jackson | Artillery Col Stapleton Crutchfield | Poague's Battery - Cpt William T. Poague; Wooding's Battery - Cpt George W. Wooding; Carpenter's Battery - Cpt Joseph Carpenter; Caskie's Battery - Cpt William H. Caskie; Carrington's Virginia Battery - Cpt Joseph Carrington; Cutshaw's Battery - Cpt Wilfred Emory Cutshaw (w); Lt John Carpenter |

| Division | Brigade | Regiment or other |
|---|---|---|
| Ewell's Division; MG Richard S. Ewell | Second (Steuart's) Brigade Col William C. Scott | 44th Virginia Infantry – Col William C. Scott, Maj Norvell P. Cobb; 52nd Virginia Infantry – Ltc James H. Skinner; 58th Virginia Infantry - Col Samuel H. Letcher |
| Ewell's Division; MG Richard S. Ewell | Fourth (Elzey's) Brigade BG Arnold Elzey | 12th Georgia Infantry - Col Zephaniah T. Conner; 13th Virginia Infantry - Col James A. Walker; 25th Virginia Infantry - Ltc Patrick Duffy; 31st Virginia Infantry - Col John S. Hoffman |
| Ewell's Division; MG Richard S. Ewell | Seventh (Trimble's) Brigade BG Isaac Trimble | 15th Alabama Infantry - Col James Cantey; 21st Georgia Infantry - Col John T. Mercer; 16th Mississippi Infantry - Col Carnot Posey; 21st North Carolina Infantry - Col William W. Kirkland (w) |
| Ewell's Division; MG Richard S. Ewell | Eighth (Taylor's) Brigade BG Richard Taylor | 6th Louisiana Infantry - Col Isaac G. Seymour; 7th Louisiana Infantry – Col Harry T. Hays; 8th Louisiana Infantry - Col Henry B. Kelly; 9th Louisiana Infantry - Col Leroy A. Stafford; Wheat's Battalion ("Louisiana Tigers") – Maj C. Roberdeau Wheat |
| Ewell's Division; MG Richard S. Ewell | Independent Command | 1st Maryland Infantry – Col Bradley T. Johnson |
| Ewell's Division; MG Richard S. Ewell | Artillery Col Stapleton Crutchfield | Brockenbrough's Battery - Cpt John B. Brockenbrough; Courtney's Battery - Cpt Alfred R. Courtney; Lusk's Battery - Cpt John A. M. Lusk; Raine's Battery - Cpt Charles I. Raine; Rice's Battery - Cpt William H. Rice |
| Ewell's Division; MG Richard S. Ewell | Cavalry Brigade BG George H. Steuart | 2nd Virginia Cavalry - Col Thomas T. Munford; 6th Virginia Cavalry - Col Thomas Flournoy; 7th Virginia Cavalry - Col Turner Ashby; Chew's (Va.) Battery - Cpt R. Preston Chew |
