= Third Battle of Winchester order of battle: Confederate =

The following Confederate States Army units and commanders fought in the Third Battle of Winchester on September 19, 1864. The Union order of battle is listed separately. The battle was fought on September 19, 1864, near Winchester, Virginia, and Opequon Creek. The battle is also known as the Battle of Opequon or the Battle of Opequon Creek.

== Abbreviations used ==
=== Military rank ===
- LTG = Lieutenant General
- MG = Major General
- BG = Brigadier General
- Col = Colonel
- Ltc = Lieutenant Colonel
- Maj = Major
- Cpt = Captain
- Lt = Lieutenant

=== Other ===
- w = wounded
- mw = mortally wounded
- k = killed
- c = captured

== Army of the Valley District ==
LTG Jubal Early (Note: The main source herein is Appendix 1 in Scott Patchan's The Last Battle of Winchester... Some additional information has been used from the text of the same book, and is footnoted. Official Records... by Ainsworth and Kirkley of the United States War Department, Volume XLIII, Chapter LV, did not have an order of battle for Third Winchester, but has been used for small bits of information that are footnoted.)
Staff:
Adjutant general: Ltc Alexander Pendleton

Size as of September 10, 1864 = 15,514 men.

Infantry - 10,116
Cavalry - 4,585
Artillery - 813

=== Breckinridge's Corps ===
MG John C. Breckinridge

Staff:
Chief of Artillery: Ltc John Floyd King

Division	Brigade	Regiments and Others
Breckinridge's Division; BG Gabriel C. Wharton	Smith's Brigade Col Thomas Smith	36th Virginia Infantry: Col Thomas Smith; 60th Virginia Infantry; 45th Virginia Infantry Battalion; Thomas' Legion (North Carolina): Col James R. Love II
Breckinridge's Division; BG Gabriel C. Wharton	Forsberg's Brigade Col Augustus Forsberg (w); Maj William A. Yonce (mw)	45th Virginia Infantry; 51st Virginia Infantry: Maj William A. Yonce (mw); 30th Virginia Sharpshooters Battalion: Cpt Stephen Adam (w)
Breckinridge's Division; BG Gabriel C. Wharton	Patton's Brigade Col George S. Patton (mw)	22nd Virginia Infantry: Ltc John C. McDonald; 23rd Virginia Infantry Battalion: Ltc Clarence Derrick (w&c); 26th Virginia Infantry Battalion: Ltc George M. Edgar (c)
Gordon's Division (Note: All three brigades in Gordon's Division are consolidations of depleted units. Evans' Brigade lost so many officers that inspectors believed it interfered seriously with its good management. Terry's Brigade consisted of remnants of the Stonewall, Jones, and Steuart brigades formerly of Johnson's Division. York's Brigade was composed of fragments of Hays' and Stafford's brigades.); MG John B. Gordon	Evans' Brigade Col Edmund N. Atkinson	13th Georgia Infantry: Col John H. Baker; 26th Georgia Infantry: Ltc James Blain; 31st Georgia Infantry: Col John H. Lowe; 38th Georgia Infantry: Ltc Philip E. Davant; Maj. Thomas Bomar; 60th Georgia Infantry: Cpt Milton Russell; 61st Georgia Infantry: Cpt Eliphalet F. Sharp; 12th Georgia Infantry Battalion: Cpt James W. Anderson (w&c)
Gordon's Division; MG John B. Gordon	Terry's Brigade BG William Terry	Stonewall Brigade: Col John H.S. Funk (mw); Col Abraham Spengler; 2nd Virginia Infantry; 4th Virginia Infantry; 5th Virginia Infantry; 27th Virginia Infantry; 33rd Virginia Infantry - Col Abraham Spengler; Second: Col Robert H. Dungan; 21st Virginia Infantry; 25th Virginia Infantry; 43rd Virginia Infantry; 44th Virginia Infantry; 48th Virginia Infantry; 50th Virginia Infantry; Third Brigade: Ltc Samuel Saunders (w); Cpt William B. Yancy (w&c); 10th Virginia Infantry; 23rd Virginia Infantry; 37th Virginia Infantry
Gordon's Division; MG John B. Gordon	York's Brigade BG Zebulon York (w); Col William R. Peck (w)	Hays' Old Brigade: Col William R. Peck; 5th Louisiana Infantry - Maj Alexander Hart; 6th Louisiana Infantry - Ltc Joseph Hanlon; 7th Louisiana Infantry - Ltc Thomas M. Terry; 8th Louisiana Infantry - Capt Louis Prados; 9th Louisiana Infantry; Old Fourth Brigade: Col Eugene Waggaman; 1st Louisiana Infantry - Capt. Joseph Taylor; 2nd Louisiana Infantry - Ltc Michael A. Grogan; 10th Louisiana Infantry - Ltc Henry Monier; 14th Louisiana Infantry - Ltc David Zable; 15th Louisiana Infantry - Capt H. J. Egan
Rodes' Division; MG Robert E. Rodes (k); BG Cullen A. Battle	Battle's Brigade BG Cullen Battle; Col Samuel B. Pickens (w); Col Charles Forsyth	3rd Alabama Infantry: Col Charles Forsyth; 5th Alabama Infantry: Col Josephus M. Hall; 6th Alabama Infantry: Ltc Isaac F. Culver (w); 12th Alabama Infantry: Col Samuel B. Pickens; 61st Alabama Infantry: Ltc Lewis H. Hill
Rodes' Division; MG Robert E. Rodes (k); BG Cullen A. Battle	Grimes' Brigade BG Bryan Grimes	32nd North Carolina Infantry: Col David G. Cowand; 43rd North Carolina Infantry: Maj Walter J. Boggan; 45th North Carolina Infantry: Col John R. Winston; 53rd North Carolina Infantry: Col James T. Morehead; 2nd North Carolina Infantry Battalion: Maj John M. Hancock
Rodes' Division; MG Robert E. Rodes (k); BG Cullen A. Battle	Cox's Brigade Col William R. Cox	1st North Carolina Infantry: Col Hamilton A. Brown; 2nd North Carolina Infantry: Col William R. Cox; 3rd North Carolina Infantry: Col Stephen Thurston; 4th North Carolina Infantry: Col Edwin A. Osborne; 14th North Carolina Infantry: Col Risden Tyler Bennett (c); 30th North Carolina Infantry: Col Francis M. Parker
Rodes' Division; MG Robert E. Rodes (k); BG Cullen A. Battle	Cook's Brigade BG Philip Cook	4th Georgia Infantry: Ltc William H. Willis; 12th Georgia Infantry: Col Edward Willis; 21st Georgia Infantry: Col John T. Mercer; 44th Georgia Infantry: Col William H. Peebles
Ramseur's Division; MG Stephen D. Ramseur	Pegram's Brigade BG John Pegram	13th Virginia Infantry: Ltc George A. Goodman (w, c); Maj. Charles T. Crittenden; 31st Virginia Infantry: Col John S. Hoffman; 49th Virginia Infantry: Col Jonathan C. Gibson; Capt. William D. Moffett; 52nd Virginia Infantry: Col James H. Skinner (?); 58th Virginia Infantry: Capt. Leroy C. James
Ramseur's Division; MG Stephen D. Ramseur	Hoke's Brigade BG Archibald C. Godwin (k); Ltc Anderson Ellis (w); Ltc William S. Davis	6th North Carolina Infantry: Ltc Samuel McD. Tate; 21st North Carolina Infantry: Ltc Wiley F. Hartsfield; Maj. William J. Pfohl; 54th North Carolina Infantry: Ltc Anderson Ellis; 57th North Carolina Infantry: Ltc Hamilton C. Jones (?); Capt John Beard
Ramseur's Division; MG Stephen D. Ramseur	Johnston's Brigade BG Robert D. Johnston	5th North Carolina Infantry: Col John W. Lea; 12th North Carolina Infantry: Ltc William S. Davis; 20th North Carolina Infantry: Col Thomas F. Toon; 23rd North Carolina Infantry: Col Charles C. Blacknall (mw)
Artillery; Col Thomas H. Carter	Braxton's Battalion Ltc Carter M. Braxton (Note: Patchan describes Braxton as a Major in his Appendix 1 and in some portions of his text, but as a Lieutenant Colonel in Chapters 18 and 19 of his book.)	Allegheny Artillery (Virginia): Cpt John C. Carpenter; Lee Battery (Virginia): Cpt William W. Hardwick; Stafford Battery (Virginia): Cpt Raleigh Cooper
Artillery; Col Thomas H. Carter	McLaughlin's Battalion Maj William McLaughlin	Lewisburg Battery (Virginia): Cpt Thomas Bryan; Monroe Battery (Virginia): Cpt George B. Chapman; Wise Legion Battery (Virginia): Cpt William M. Lowry
Artillery; Col Thomas H. Carter	Nelson's Battalion Ltc William Nelson (Note: Patchan describes Nelson as a Major in his Appendix 1, but as a Lieutenant Colonel in Chapter 13 of his book.)	Amherst Battery (Virginia): Cpt Thomas J. Kirkpatrick; Fluvanna Artillery (Virginia): Cpt John L. Massie; Georgia Regular Battery: Lt. Thomas A. Maddox

=== Cavalry Corps ===
MG Fitzhugh Lee (w)

Division	Brigade	Regiments and Others
Lee's Division; BG Williams Wickham	Lomax's Brigade Col William H.F. Payne	5th Virginia Cavalry: Col Reuben B. Boston; 6th Virginia Cavalry: Col Julian Harrison; 15th Virginia Cavalry: Col Charles R. Collins
Lee's Division; BG Williams Wickham	Wickham's Brigade Col Thomas T. Munford	1st Virginia Cavalry: Col Richard W. Carter; 2nd Virginia Cavalry: Col Thomas T. Munford; 3rd Virginia Cavalry: Col Thomas H. Owen; 4th Virginia Cavalry
Lee's Division; BG Williams Wickham	Horse Artillery Maj James Breathed	1st Stuart Horse Artillery (Virginia): Cpt Philip P. Johnston; Lynchburg Beauregard Battery: Cpt John J. Shoemaker
Lomax's Division; MG Lunsford L. Lomax	Imboden's Brigade Col George H. Smith	18th Virginia Cavalry; 23rd Virginia Cavalry: Ltc Charles T. O'Ferrall; 62nd Virginia Mounted Infantry
Lomax's Division; MG Lunsford L. Lomax	Johnson's Brigade BG Bradley T. Johnson	1st Maryland Cavalry Battalion : Cpt Gustavus W. Dorsey; 2nd Maryland Cavalry Battalion : Maj Harry Gilmor; 8th Virginia Cavalry: Col James M. Corns; 21st Virginia Cavalry: Col William E. Peters; 27th Virginia Cavalry Battalion; 36th Virginia Cavalry Battalion: Maj James W. Sweeney; 37th Virginia Cavalry Battalion: Ltc James R. Claiburne
Lomax's Division; MG Lunsford L. Lomax	McCausland's Brigade Col Milton Ferguson (Note: The official commander of this brigade, BG John C. McCausland, was absent during the battle for undisclosed reasons.)	14th Virginia Cavalry: Col James Cochran; 16th Virginia Cavalry; 17th Virginia Cavalry; 22nd Virginia Cavalry: Col John T. Radford
Lomax's Division; MG Lunsford L. Lomax	Jackson's Brigade Ltc William P. Thompson	19th Virginia Cavalry; 20th Virginia Cavalry; 46th Virginia Cavalry Battalion; 47th Virginia Cavalry Battalion
Lomax's Division; MG Lunsford L. Lomax	Vaughn's Brigade Ltc Onslow Bean	16th Georgia Cavalry Battalion; 1st Tennessee Cavalry; 12th Tennessee Cavalry Battalion; 16th Tennessee Cavalry Battalion; 39th Tennessee Mounted Infantry; 43rd Tennessee Mounted Infantry; 59th Tennessee Mounted Infantry; 60th–61st–62nd Tennessee Mounted Infantry
Lomax's Division; MG Lunsford L. Lomax	Horse Artillery	Charlottesville Battery (Virginia): Cpt Thomas Jackson; Roanoke Battery (Virginia): Cpt Warren Lurty; Staunton Battery (Virginia): Cpt John H. McClanahan

== Notes ==
=== References ===
- Ainsworth, Fred C.; Kirkley, Joseph W. (1902). The War of the Rebellion: a Compilation of the Official Records of the Union and Confederate Armies - Series I Volume XLIII Part I - Additions and Corrections, Chapter LV. Washington, District of Columbia: Government Printing Office. OCLC 427057.
- Clark, Walter (1901). Histories of the Several Regiments and Battalions from North Carolina, in the Great War 1861-'65 (Vol. 3). Raleigh, North Carolina: Published by the state. OCLC 1300611.
- Early, Jubal A.; Early, Ruth H. (1912). Lieutenant General Jubal Anderson Early, C.S.A. Autobiographical Sketch and Narrative of the War Between the States. Philadelphia, Pennsylvania: J.B. Lippincott Co. ISBN 9781468192155. OCLC 1370161.
- Patchan, Scott C. (2013). The Last Battle of Winchester: Phil Sheridan, Jubal Early, and the Shenandoah Valley Campaign, August 7-September 19, 1864. El Dorado Hills, Calif: Savas Beatie. ISBN 978-1-932714-98-2. OCLC 751578151.
- Wert, Jeffry D. (2010). From Winchester to Cedar Creek: The Shenandoah Campaign of 1864. Carbondale, Illinois: Southern Illinois University Press. ISBN 978-0-80932-972-4. OCLC 463454602.
