= Winchester, Oklahoma =

- Town
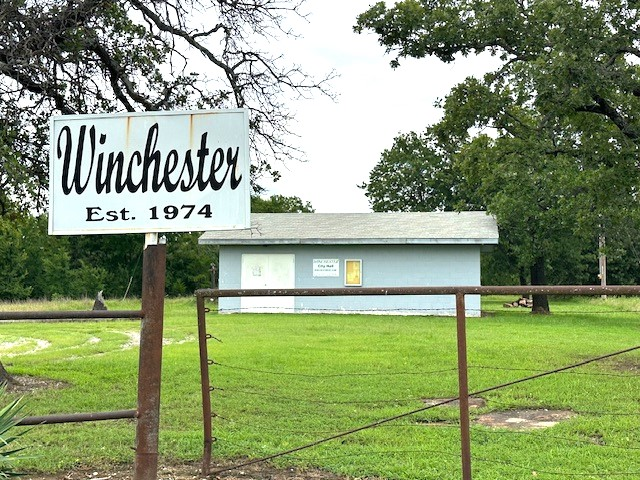
- Winchester's City Hall, July 2025

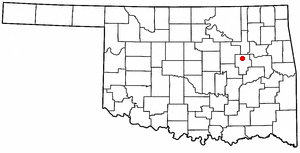
- Location of Winchester, Oklahoma
- Coordinates: 35°47′26″N 95°59′53″W
- Country: United States
- State: Oklahoma
- County: Okmulgee

Area
  - Total: 5.46 sq mi (14.13 km^{2})
  - Land: 5.46 sq mi (14.13 km^{2})
  - Water: 0 sq mi (0.00 km^{2})
- Elevation: 840 ft (260 m)

Population (2020)
  - Total: 546
  - Density: 100.1/sq mi (38.65/km^{2})
- Time zone: UTC-6 (Central (CST))
  - Summer (DST): UTC-5 (CDT)
- FIPS code: 40-81575
- GNIS feature ID: 2413493
- Website: winchesterok.com

Winchester is a town in Okmulgee County, Oklahoma, United States. The population was 546 at the 2020 census, an increase of 5.8% from the figure of 516 recorded in 2010. It is a recently built residential community, having incorporated February 18, 1974.

This is not to be confused with the old settlement of Winchester in Woods County, Oklahoma near the Kansas border, west of the present-day U.S. Route 281 and west-southwest of Hardtner, Kansas.

== History ==
Winchester began as a residential community on 2,500 acres of land acquired by William D. Crews in 1959. It was intended to attract people who were "tired and frustrated" with life in Tulsa. It incorporated February 18, 1974. By 1980, it had a population of 150. However, by 2000 it still had no retail businesses or municipal services. Telephone, mail, school, and fire-fighting services are supplied by the town of Beggs.

== Geography ==
Winchester is located approximately 25 miles (40 km) south of downtown Tulsa. The town's fenceline runs approximately from U.S. Route 75, a major national north/south artery, on the west side to approximately 3 miles (4.8 km) east of the highway, and from 241st St. in the north to Oklahoma State Highway 16 in the south. Winchester residents have a Beggs mailing address, but the town of Beggs is actually southwest of Winchester and on the opposite side of U.S. 75.

According to the United States Census Bureau, the town has a total area of 4.5 square miles (11.7 km^{2}), all land.

== Demographics ==
Historical population
Census	Pop.	Note	%±
1980	150		—
1990	301		100.7%
2000	424		40.9%
2010	516		21.7%
2020	546		5.8%
U.S. Decennial Census

=== 2020 census ===
As of the 2020 census, Winchester had a population of 546. The median age was 40.8 years. 23.6% of residents were under the age of 18 and 17.6% of residents were 65 years of age or older. For every 100 females there were 110.0 males, and for every 100 females age 18 and over there were 105.4 males age 18 and over.

0.0% of residents lived in urban areas, while 100.0% lived in rural areas.

There were 182 households in Winchester, of which 35.7% had children under the age of 18 living in them. Of all households, 58.8% were married-couple households, 15.9% were households with a male householder and no spouse or partner present, and 20.3% were households with a female householder and no spouse or partner present. About 15.9% of all households were made up of individuals and 3.8% had someone living alone who was 65 years of age or older.

There were 206 housing units, of which 11.7% were vacant. The homeowner vacancy rate was 2.3% and the rental vacancy rate was 0.0%.

Racial composition as of the 2020 census
Race	Number	Percent
White	393	72.0%
Black or African American	2	0.4%
American Indian and Alaska Native	64	11.7%
Asian	0	0.0%
Native Hawaiian and Other Pacific Islander	0	0.0%
Some other race	17	3.1%
Two or more races	70	12.8%
Hispanic or Latino (of any race)	27	4.9%

=== 2000 census ===
As of the census of 2000, there were 424 people, 153 households, and 123 families residing in the town. The population density was 94.0 inhabitants per square mile (36.3/km^{2}). There were 169 housing units at an average density of 37.5 per square mile (14.5/km^{2}). The racial makeup of the town was 83.73% White, 0.71% African American, 6.37% Native American, 0.24% Asian, 2.83% from other races, and 6.13% from two or more races. Hispanic or Latino of any race were 6.60% of the population.

There were 153 households, out of which 31.4% had children under the age of 18 living with them, 68.0% were married couples living together, 6.5% had a female householder with no husband present, and 19.6% were non-families. 17.0% of all households were made up of individuals, and 3.9% had someone living alone who was 65 years of age or older. The average household size was 2.77 and the average family size was 3.08.

In the town, the population was spread out, with 27.4% under the age of 18, 7.3% from 18 to 24, 30.0% from 25 to 44, 26.2% from 45 to 64, and 9.2% who were 65 years of age or older. The median age was 37 years. For every 100 females, there were 103.8 males. For every 100 females age 18 and over, there were 96.2 males.

The median income for a household in the town was $37,031, and the median income for a family was $49,444. Males had a median income of $34,792 versus $20,833 for females. The per capita income for the town was $14,614. About 4.0% of families and 10.4% of the population were below the poverty line, including 2.0% of those under age 18 and 21.7% of those age 65 or over.

== In the news ==
William D. Crews on behalf of the Green Country Racing Association applied to the Oklahoma Horse Racing Commission to build a $120 million pari-mutuel horse racetrack in the town, to be called Winchester Park, on December 16, 1983. However, that application was turned down twice, once in 1984 based on insufficient financing and unrealistic attendance and wagering projections, and finally in 1985 as incomplete.

Winchester again made the news in March 1989 when the Institute for the Study of American Wars (ISAW), a Delaware-based nonprofit organization, chose Winchester over competing sites in Oklahoma, Arizona, Pennsylvania and New Mexico for a proposed $150 million war museum complex. However, the selection was withdrawn in April after a disagreement regarding donation of the land. ISAW claimed the State of Oklahoma could not or would not follow through on an earlier pledge of immediate donation in fee of 300 acres of land, and was instead offering only a 200-year lease of the land and/or was demanding proof that ISAW had the funding to build the museum prior to transfer of the land. ISAW later admitted to having raised only $65,000. ISAW then selected the Phoenix area and on July 17, 1989, announced the exact site as a donated 300 acres of a 7,500-acre cotton farm between Phoenix and Tucson once owned by movie star John Wayne, known as John Wayne's Red River Ranch, in Casa Grande, Arizona. In the end, the museum was never built in any location, and ISAW's entity status was voided effective March 1, 1998, by the Delaware Secretary of State.

== Ordinances and land covenants ==
The town's website indicates Winchester is a "restricted residential community"; i.e., the town is subject to land covenants and zoning ordinances which restrict, among other things, mobile homes in many locations. At least one lawsuit to enforce the ordinances and covenants against a homeowner placing a mobile home in an unauthorized location has been successfully prosecuted.
