= James M. Warner =

Union United States Army general

James Meech Warner
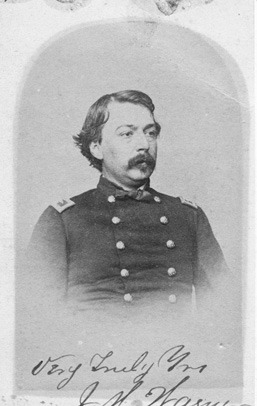
- Born: January 29, 1836; Middlebury, Vermont, US
- Died: March 16, 1897 (aged 61); New York City, US
- Military career
- Allegiance: United States; Union
- Branch: United States Army; Union Army
- Service years: 1860–1866
- Rank: Brigadier General
- Commands: 11th Vermont Infantry
- Conflicts: American Civil War

James Meech Warner (January 29, 1836 – March 16, 1897) was a New England manufacturer and a brevet brigadier general in the Union Army during the American Civil War.

== Early life ==
Warner was born in Middlebury, Vermont, the son of Joseph and Jane Anne (Meech) Warner. He graduated from Kimball Union Academy in Meriden, New Hampshire in 1854, and attended Middlebury College for two years, until he was accepted as a cadet in the United States Military Academy on July 1, 1855. He graduated from West Point on July 1, 1860, standing 40th in a class of 41. Following graduation Warner was assigned to the 10th U.S. Infantry as a Brevet 2nd Lieutenant, and, on February 28, 1861, was promoted to a full 2nd Lieutenant and was transferred to the 8th U.S. Infantry. He was then promoted to 1st Lieutenant May 31, 1861, and was assigned to Fort Wise, Colorado Territory.

== Civil War ==
Warner agreed to an offer by the State of Vermont to lead a volunteer regiment was then and he was appointed colonel on September 1, 1862, and assigned to command the 11th Vermont Infantry (also known as the 1st Artillery, Vermont Volunteers).

His regiment was assigned to the northern defenses of Washington, D.C., from September 1862 until May 1864, when Lt. Gen. Ulysses S. Grant called for more troops to support his Overland Campaign. The 11th Vermont joined the Vermont Brigade after the Battle of the Wilderness, and first saw action at the Battle of Spotsylvania Court House. In his first engagement, on May 18, 1864, Warner was severely wounded, but refused to leave the field until the end of the day. He was sent home on furlough to recover.

He returned from convalescence leave on July 8, 1864, and was assigned to command the 1st brigade, Hardin's division, XXII Corps, in the defense of Washington. He returned to his regiment later that month, but was reassigned to command the 1st Brigade, 2nd Division, VI Corps in September 1864. He commanded that brigade until it was disbanded in May 1865.

On January 31, 1865, President Abraham Lincoln nominated Warner for appointment to the grade of brevet brigadier general, Volunteers, to rank from April 1, 1864, "for gallant and meritorious service" at the battle of Spotsylvania Court House, and at the battles of Winchester, Fisher's Hill and Cedar Creek. The United States Senate confirmed the appointment on February 14, 1865. Warner was then promoted to captain, 8th U.S. Infantry, in the Regular Army on October 8, 1864. He also received brevets as major, lieutenant colonel and colonel, U.S. Army, to rank from March 13, 1865, "for gallant and meritorious service during the war." Warner was appointed brigadier general, volunteers, on May 8, 1865, to rank from May 8, 1865, although his nomination to this grade was sent to the U.S. Senate only on January 13, 1866 and was confirmed by the Senate on February 23, 1866. On July 17, 1866, President Andrew Johnson nominated Warner for appointment to the grade of brevet brigadier general, U.S. Army, to rank from April 9, 1865, "for gallant and meritorious services in the field during the war" and the U.S. Senate confirmed the appointment on July 23, 1866.

He mustered out of voluntary service on January 1, 1866, and resigned his Regular Army commission on February 13.

== Postwar activities ==
After the war, Warner moved to Albany, New York, where he engaged in paper manufacturing as president of the Albany Card and Paper Company. On December 19, 1889, he was appointed postmaster of Albany by President Benjamin Harrison's administration.

Warner died March 16, 1897, in New York City.

James Warner married Matilda Elizabeth Allen, daughter of George Allen and Sophia Sargent, in early June 1863, while he was stationed in the northern defenses of Washington.

== See also ==
- Vermont in the Civil War
- List of American Civil War generals (Union)
