= 11th Vermont Infantry Regiment =

- Flag of Vermont, 1837–1923
- Active: September 1, 1862 to December 10 (changed to 1st Vermont Heavy Artillery)
- Allegiance: (United States)
- Branch: United States Army
- Type: Infantry
- Engagements: American Civil War

Commanders
- Current commander: Colonel James M. Warner

The 11th Vermont Infantry Regiment was a three-years infantry regiment in the Union Army during the American Civil War. It served in eastern theater, from September 1862 to August 1865. It served in the XXII Corps in the defenses of Washington D.C., and with the Vermont Brigade in VI Corps. The regiment was mustered into United States service on September 1, 1862, at Brattleboro, Vermont. On December 10, 1862, its designation changed to the 1st Vermont Heavy Artillery.

== History ==
The unit was engaged in, or present at:

- Spotsylvania, Cold Harbor, Petersburg, and the first Battle of Weldon Railroad, now known as the Battle of Jerusalem Plank Road, in the Overland campaign. In the latter 267 men from the 11th and 140 from the 4th Vermont were captured by a superior force. The captives were all sent to Andersonville prison where 232 of them died.
- Fort Stevens, Charlestown, Gilbert's Ford, Winchester, Fisher's Hill and Cedar Creek in the Shenandoah Valley campaign
- In the Siege of Petersburg.

== Losses in the war ==
The regiment lost during service:

- 152 men killed and mortally wounded
- 2 died from accidents
- 175 died in Confederate prisons
- 210 died from disease

Total loss: 539

The regiment mustered out of service on August 25, 1865.

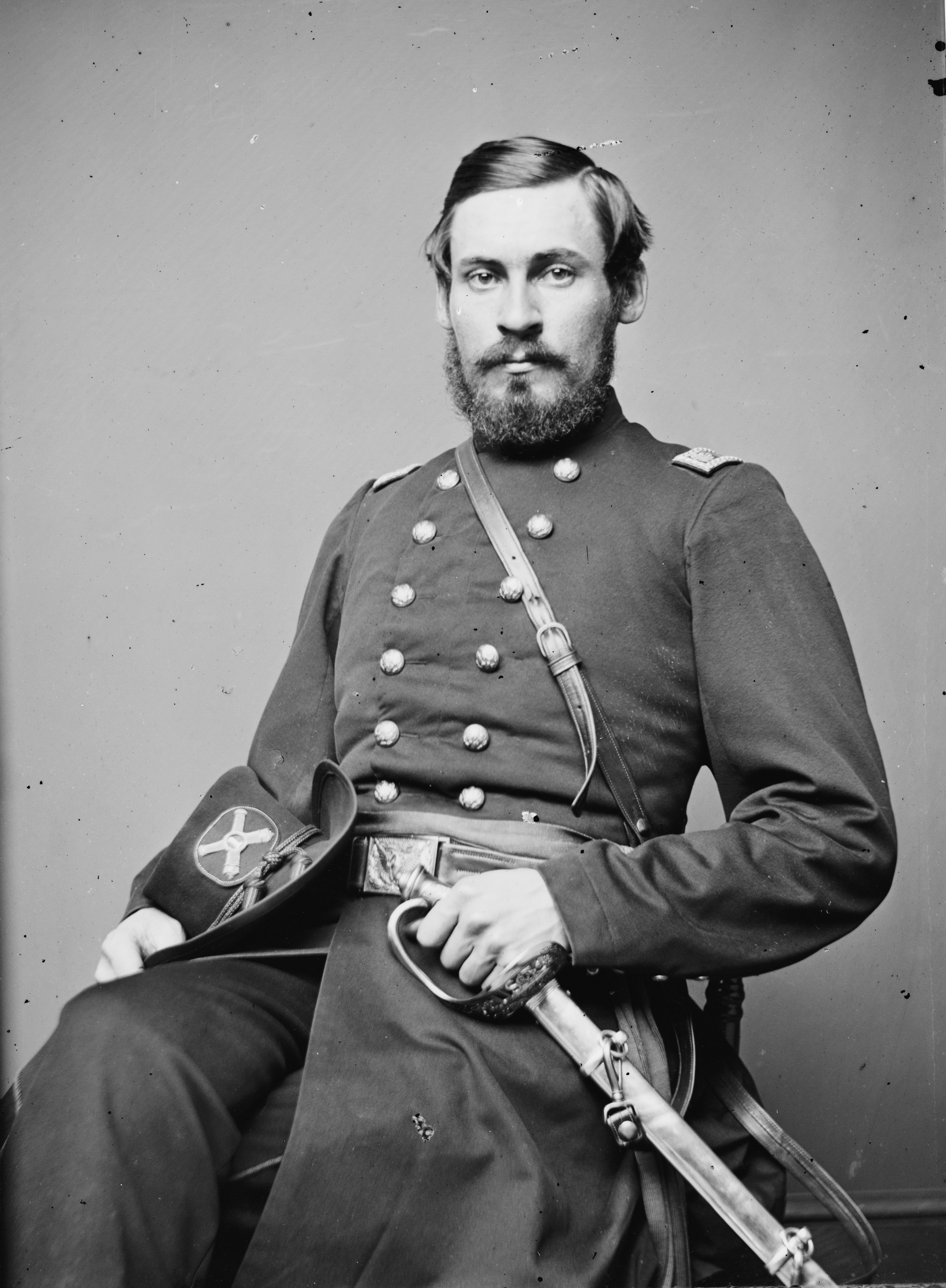
Lt. Col. George Ephraim Chamberlin of the 1st Vermont Heavy Artillery Regiment

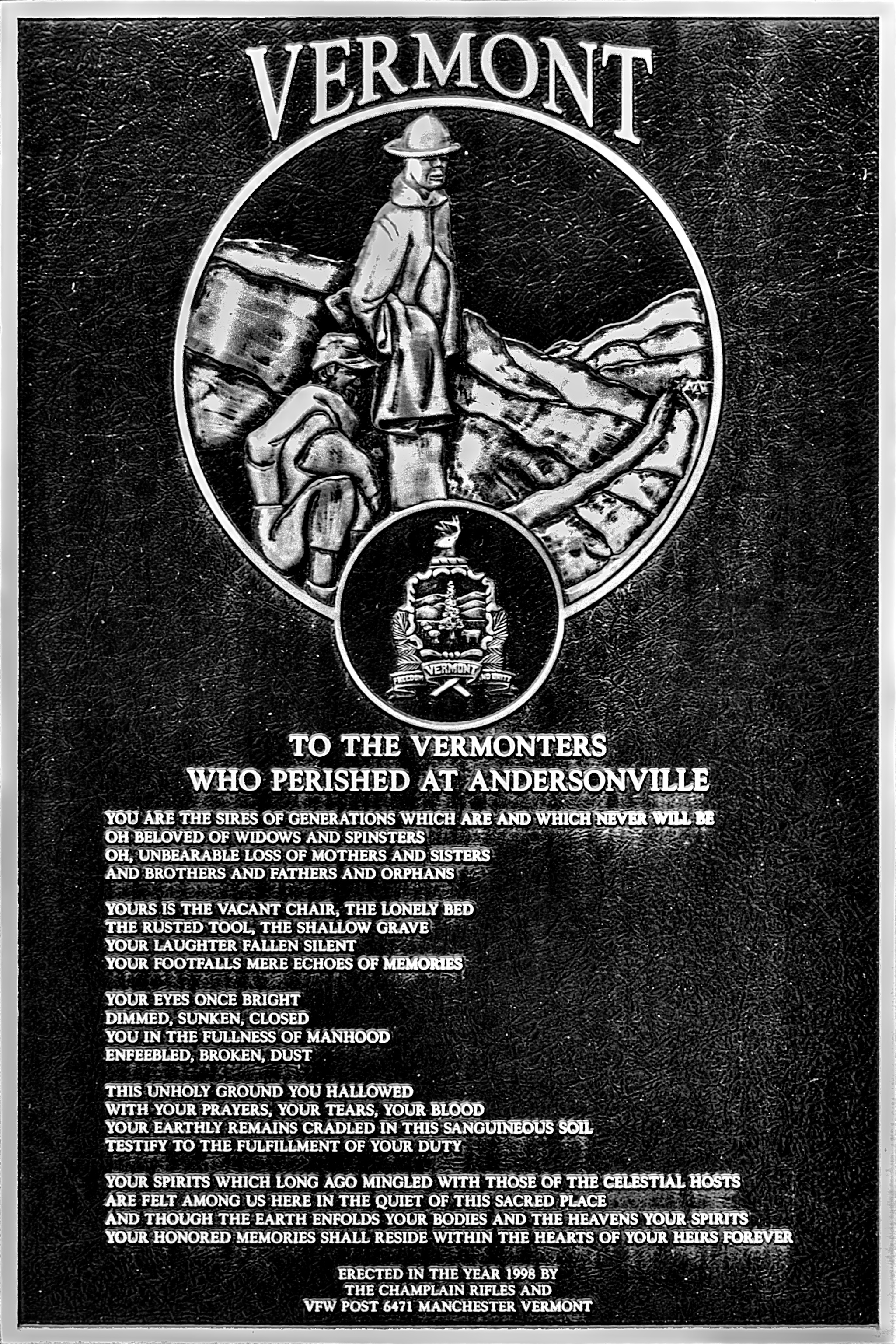
Memorial to the Vermonters who Perished at Andersonville
