= Presque Isle (community), Wisconsin =

Presque Isle, Wisconsin
- Unincorporated community
- Location within Wisconsin Location within the United States
- Coordinates: 46°14′50″N 89°43′46″W
- Country: United States
- State: Wisconsin
- County: Vilas
- Elevation: 1,667 ft (508 m)
- Time zone: UTC-6 (Central (CST))
  - Summer (DST): UTC-5 (CDT)
- ZIP code: 54557
- Area codes: 715 & 534
- GNIS feature ID: 1580803

Presque Isle is an unincorporated community located in the town of Presque Isle, Vilas County, Wisconsin, United States. Presque Isle is 32.5 miles (52.3 km) northwest of Eagle River and approximately 1 mile (1.6 km) south of the Michigan state line. Presque Isle has a post office with ZIP code 54557.

== History ==
In 1905, J.J. Foster erected a lumber mill on the side of a pond at the headwaters of the Presque Isle River. The townsite commands a large hill virtually on the Continental Divide and the waters flow north from this point to Lake Superior. Foster named the community Fosterville. William S. Winegar bought the mill in 1910 and the town was renamed in his honor. The mill closed in 1933 and Walleye Rearing Ponds were established on the mill grounds by the State of Wisconsin. In 1959, the town changed its name again, now to Presque Isle which matches the name of the surrounding township which comprises approximately 77 square miles. The village is currently the site of the Presque Isle Community Center, Presque Isle Fire Department, and the Presque Isle Community Library.

== Transportation ==
The community of Presque Isle is located at the corner of Vilas County Highways W and B. It is located approximately 2 miles (3.2 km) south of the southern terminus of M-64.
