= Winchester, Woods County, Oklahoma =

Populated place in Oklahoma, US

Coordinates: 36°57′26″N 98°47′50″W

Winchester is a populated place in Woods County, Oklahoma. It is located at an elevation of 1,483 feet at a point 9.1 miles west-southwest of Hardtner, Kansas, and 12 miles northwest of the Woods County seat of Alva, Oklahoma.

== History ==
Winchester, as part of what became Woods County, was opened to settlement by the Land Run of 1893. A post office was created there in 1895 while the area was still Oklahoma Territory. A 1902 Woods County Directory indicates the town had daily stage service to Alva. Casual mentions of Winchester can be found in Renfrew’s Record, the newspaper in Alva, from at least 1902 to 1921. A 1911 map of Woods County shows its location, together with the ephemeral settlements of Fitzlen to its east, Gamet to its southeast, Flagg to its southwest, and Faulkner, Abbie & Kingman to its west.

But Winchester was not built on a railway: the rail line from Kiowa, Kansas came into Alva from the northeast, running well east of Winchester, while the Buffalo and Northwestern Railroad, which connected Buffalo, Oklahoma with Waynoka by way of Freedom in the 1919–20 timeframe, was too far south. Further, the town was bypassed by major highways, with the nearest, US Route 281, well to the location’s east. The town did not thrive, and the post office closed in 1939.

This settlement is not to be confused with the modern-day community of Winchester, Oklahoma, in Okmulgee County.
