= Thornton F. Brodhead =

American Civil War general

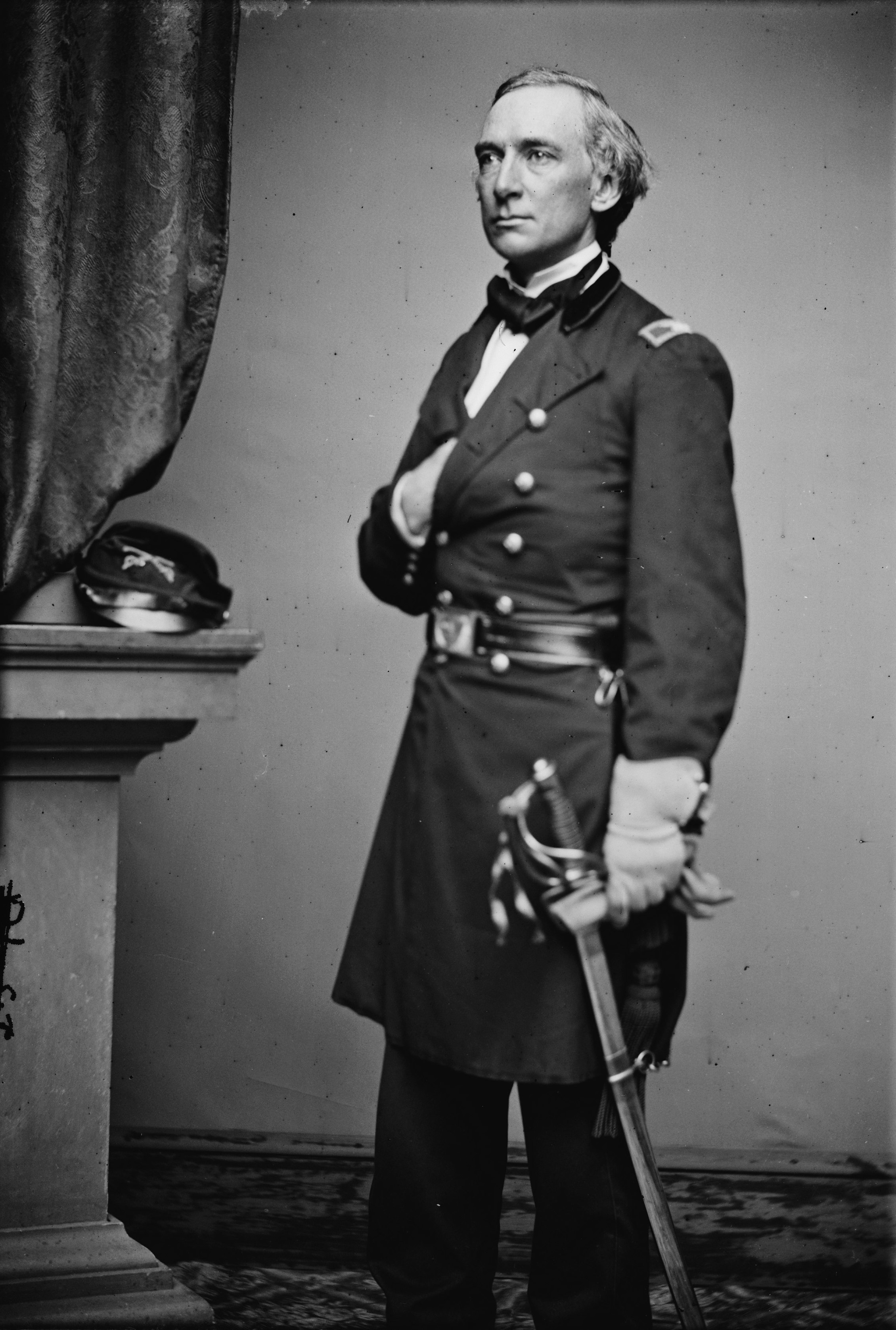
- Brodhead, c. 1860–1862
- Born: December 5, 1820; South New Market, New Hampshire, U.S.
- Died: September 2, 1862 (aged 41)
- Military career
- Allegiance: United States (Union)
- Branch: United States Army; Union Army
- Service years: 1847–1862
- Rank: Brevet Brigadier general
- Unit: 15th Infantry Regiment
- Commands: 1st Michigan Volunteer Cavalry Regiment
- Conflicts: Mexican–American War; American Civil War; Second Battle of Bull Run (DOW)

Thornton Fleming Brodhead (December 5, 1820 – September 2, 1862) was a brevet brigadier general during the American Civil War.

== Biography ==
Thornton Fleming Brodhead was born in South New Market, New Hampshire, on December 5, 1820. He graduated from Harvard with a degree in law. He then moved to Pontiac, Michigan. He soon was appointed prosecuting attorney and then deputy Secretary of State.

At age 29, following the 1850 election, he became a state senator for Michigan. He served two terms. During his first term, he served on the judiciary, printing, and public lands committees. During his second term, after being elected in 1858, he served on the state library and expiring laws committees. He was elected as a Democrat both times.

Brodhead enlisted in April 1847 as 1st Lieutenant and Adjutant in the 15th U.S. Infantry during the Mexican War, and he was brevetted to the rank of captain on August 20, 1847. He was made a full captain on December 2, 1847, and was mustered out on July 31, 1848, when the troops were disbanded. In 1852 he was appointed postmaster of Detroit.

At the beginning of the civil war he raised the 1st Michigan cavalry regiment, at the head of which he served under Generals Banks and Pope. He died on September 2, 1862 of gunshot wounds received at Lewis Ford during the Second Battle of Bull Run on August 30, 1862.

== Personal life ==
Brodhead married Archange Macomb, a daughter of general Macomb and they had six children.
