= Battle of Summit Point =

Battle of the American Civil War

Coordinates: 39.2499°N 77.9586°W

- Part of the American Civil War
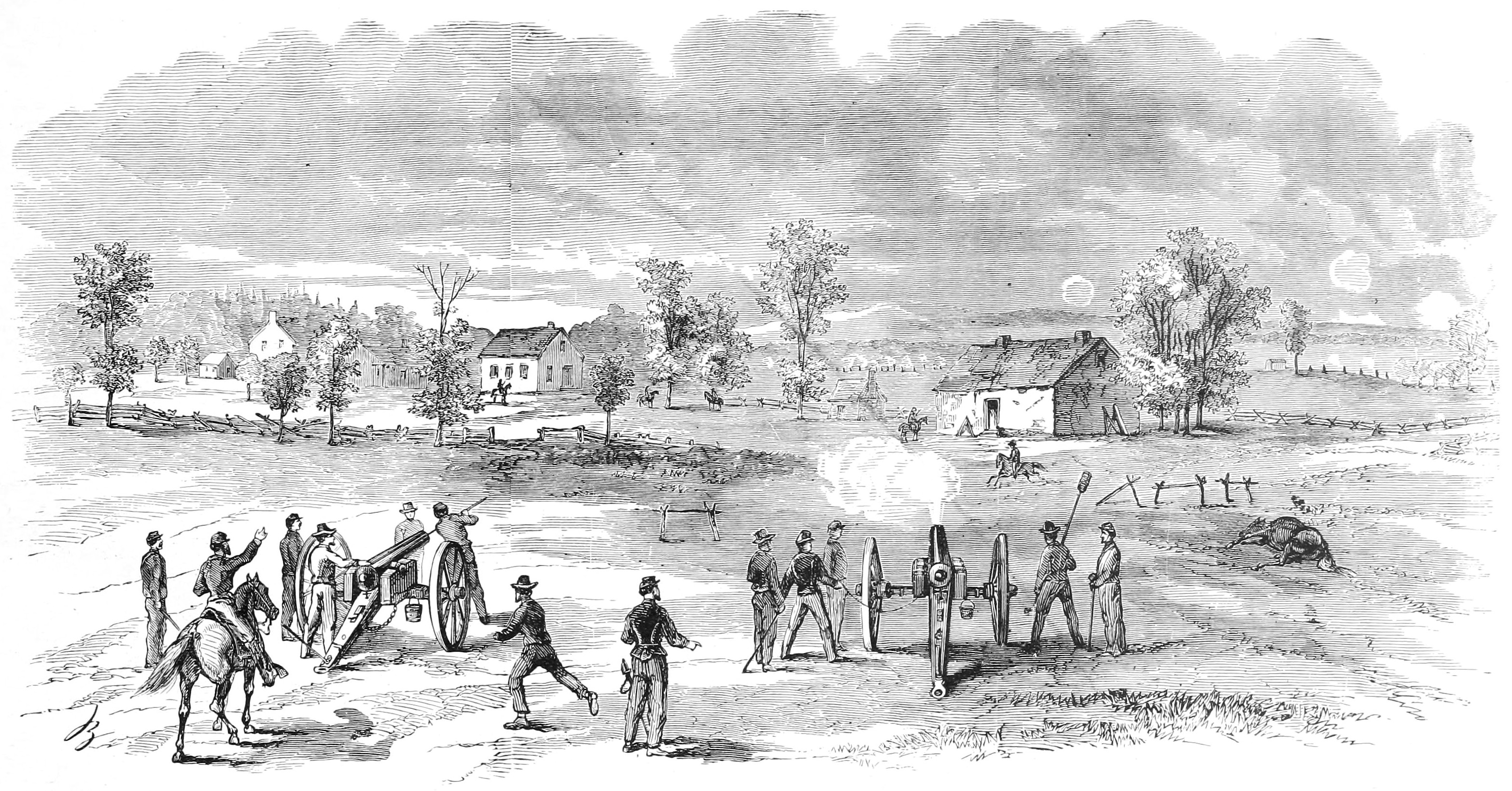
Date	August 21, 1864
Location	Summit Point, West Virginia
Result	Inconclusive

Belligerents
United States (Union)	(Confederate States of America) CSA (Confederacy)

Commanders and leaders
Philip Sheridan	Richard H. Anderson; Jubal A. Early

Units involved
VI Corps	

Strength
Divisions	Divisions

Casualties and losses
- 1,000

The Battle of Summit Point, also known as Flowing Springs or Cameron's Depot, was an inconclusive battle of the American Civil War fought on August 21, 1864, near Summit Point, West Virginia.

The battle was part of Union Maj. Gen. Philip Sheridan's Shenandoah Valley Campaign, which took place between August and December 1864. While Sheridan concentrated his army near Charles Town, Confederate Lt. Gen. Jubal A. Early and Maj. Gen. Richard H. Anderson attacked the Union forces with converging columns on August 21. Anderson struck north against the Union cavalry at Summit Point. The Union forces fought effective delaying actions, withdrawing to near Halltown on the following day. The battle resulted in approximately 1,000 casualties.

== Battlefield preservation ==
The Civil War Trust (a division of the American Battlefield Trust) and its partners have acquired and preserved 455 acres (1.84 km^{2}) of the battlefield.

== Gallery ==
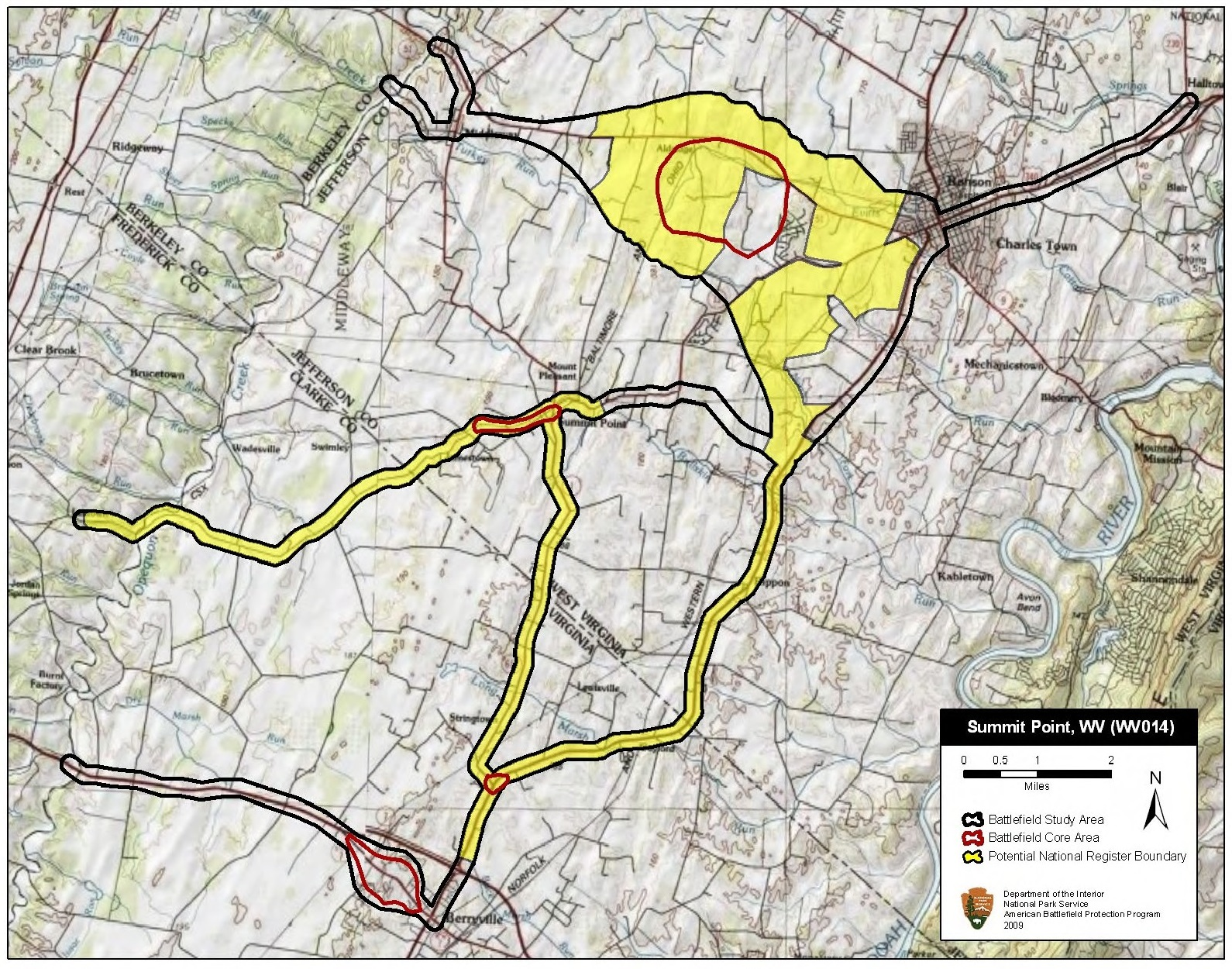
Map of Battlefield core and study areas by the American Battlefield Protection Program.
