= Winchester, Vilas County, Wisconsin =

Winchester, Wisconsin
- Town
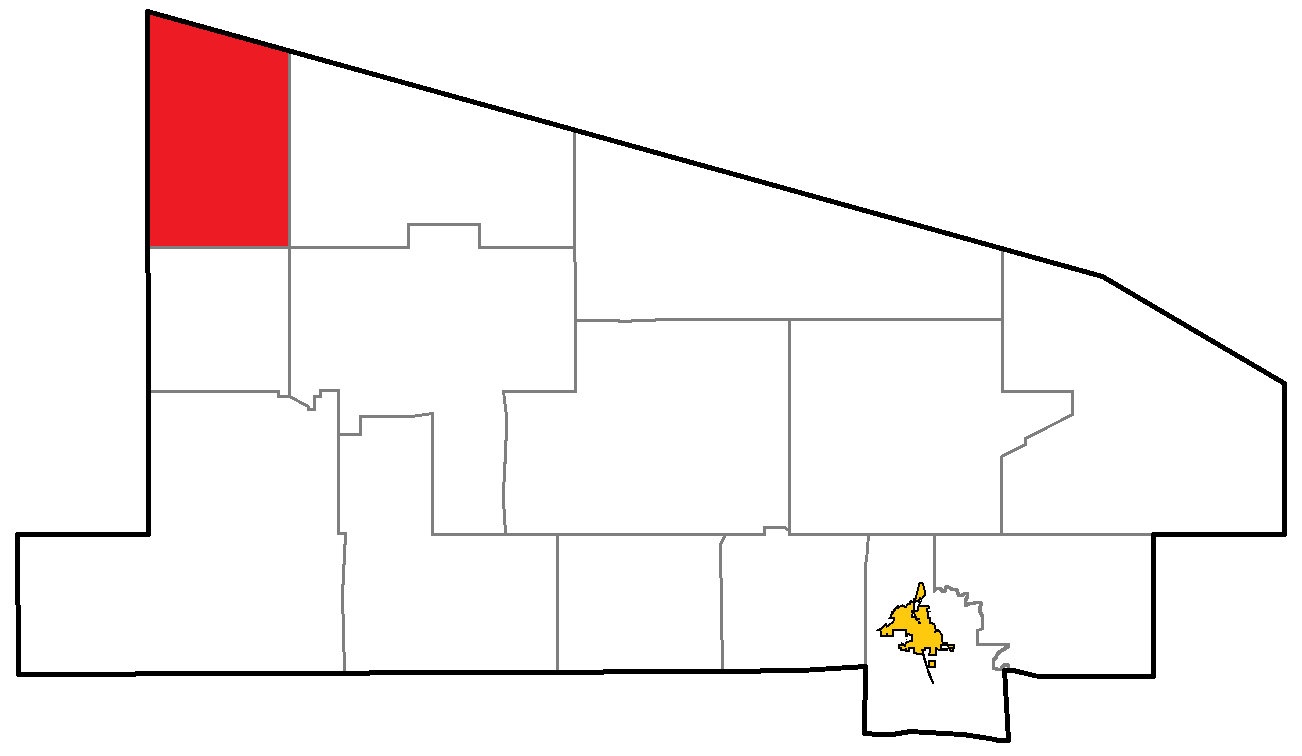
- Location of Winchester, within Vilas County
- Coordinates: 46°13′51″N 89°52′50″W
- Country: United States
- State: Wisconsin
- County: Vilas

Government
  - Town Chairman: Larry Sturgeon
  - Supervisor: Joe Osfar
  - Supervisor: Tom Misiak

Area
  - Total: 53.6 sq mi (138.8 km^{2})
  - Land: 48.1 sq mi (124.7 km^{2})
  - Water: 5.5 sq mi (14.2 km^{2})
- Elevation: 1,654 ft (504 m)

Population (2020)
  - Total: 528
  - Density: 11.0/sq mi (4.23/km^{2})
- Time zone: UTC-6 (Central (CST))
  - Summer (DST): UTC-5 (CDT)
- Area codes: 715 & 534
- FIPS code: 55-87600
- GNIS feature ID: 1584451

Winchester is a town in Vilas County, Wisconsin, United States. The population was 528 at the 2020 census. The unincorporated community of Winchester—locally known as the "Winchester Townsite"—is located in the town.

== Demographics ==
As of the census of 2000, there were 454 people, 214 households, and 148 families residing in the town. The population density was 9.4 people per square mile (3.6/km^{2}). There were 796 housing units at an average density of 16.5 per square mile (6.4/km^{2}). The racial makeup of the town was 99.78% White and 0.22% Native American.

There were 214 households, out of which 16.4% had children under the age of 18 living with them, 62.6% were married couples living together, 3.7% had a female householder with no husband present, and 30.8% were non-families. 24.3% of all households were made up of individuals, and 11.7% had someone living alone who was 65 years of age or older. The average household size was 2.12 and the average family size was 2.47.

In the town, the population was spread out, with 12.6% under the age of 18, 5.9% from 18 to 24, 15.6% from 25 to 44, 37.9% from 45 to 64, and 28.0% who were 65 years of age or older. The median age was 53 years. For every 100 females, there were 99.1 males. For every 100 females age 18 and over, there were 96.5 males.

The median income for a household in the town was $32,361, and the median income for a family was $43,333. Males had a median income of $31,875 versus $25,536 for females. The per capita income for the town was $19,720. None of the families and 4.1% of the population were living below the poverty line, including no under eighteens and 3.0% of those over 64.

== Government ==
The Winchester Town Hall, Fire Department, and Transfer Site are located on CTH W approximately one mile southeast of the unincorporated community of Winchester. The Winchester Public Library is located in the unincorporated community of Winchester. The town is governed by two supervisors and a town chairman, and is served by an elected town clerk and treasurer. It is located in Vilas County Supervisory District 2, Wisconsin Assembly District 34, Wisconsin Senate District 12, and Wisconsin's Eighth Congressional District.

== Transportation ==
Winchester is served by three Vilas County Trunk Highways. CTH W is the main route through the town, it runs east to Presque Isle and a connection with CTH B, and south to Manitowish Waters and a connection to U.S. Route 51. CTH J runs west to Mercer in Iron County and connects to USH 51. CTH O runs north to the Michigan state line and a connection to Gogebic County Highway 519 and a connection with US 2 at Wakefield, Michigan. The unincorporated community of Winchester can be accessed via town roads Old County O and Townsite Rd.

== Geography ==
The town of Winchester is located in the northwestern corner of Vilas County. It contains many lakes, including North Turtle, South Turtle, and Rock Lakes, which make up the Turtle Chain, as well as Birch, Harris, Pardee, Circle Lily and Papoose Lakes, among others. The area serves as the headwaters for the Turtle River, which is part of the Flambeau River system. According to the United States Census Bureau, the town has a total area of 53.6 square miles (138.8 km^{2}), of which 48.1 square miles (124.7 km^{2}) is land and 5.5 square miles (14.2 km^{2}) (10.21%) is water.
