= Winchester (community), Vilas County, Wisconsin =

Winchester, Wisconsin
- Unincorporated community
- Location within Wisconsin Location within the United States
- Coordinates: 46°13′19″N 89°53′53″W
- Country: United States
- State: Wisconsin
- County: Vilas
- Elevation: 1,676 ft (511 m)
- Time zone: UTC-6 (Central (CST))
  - Summer (DST): UTC-5 (CDT)
- Area codes: 715 & 534
- GNIS feature ID: 1576841

Winchester is an unincorporated community located on the west shore of South Turtle Lake in the town of Winchester, Vilas County, Wisconsin, United States. Winchester is 21 miles (34 km) southeast of Hurley. It is locally referred to as the "Winchester Townsite" and is the location of the Winchester Town Library.
