= 1st Michigan Cavalry Regiment =

- Michigan state flag
- Active: August 21, 1861, to March 10, 1866
- Country: United States
- Allegiance: Union
- Branch: Cavalry
- Engagements: Battle of Winchester; Battle of Cedar Mountain; Battle of Second Bull Run; Battle of Gettysburg; Kilpatrick's Raid on Richmond; Battle of the Wilderness; Battle of Yellow Tavern; Battle of Cedar Creek; Battle of Five Forks; Battle of Sailor's Creek

The 1st Michigan Cavalry Regiment was a cavalry regiment that served in the Union Army during the American Civil War. It was a part of the famed Michigan Brigade, commanded by Brigadier General George Armstrong Custer for a time.

== Service ==
The 1st Michigan Cavalry was organized at Detroit, Michigan, between August 21 and September 6, 1861. Among the initial officers was William d'Alton Mann, a future prominent Michigan newspaper and magazine publisher.

The regiment was mustered out of service on September 12, 1865.

== Total strength and casualties ==
Over the span of its existence, the regiment carried a total of 2,705 men on its muster rolls.

The regiment suffered 14 officers and 150 enlisted men killed in action or mortally wounded and 6 officers and 244 enlisted men who died of disease, for a total of 414 fatalities.

== Commanders ==
- Colonel Thornton F. Brodhead
- Colonel Charles H. Town
- Colonel Peter Stagg

== See also ==
- Bridget Diver
- List of Michigan Civil War Units
- Michigan in the American Civil War
