= Battle of Winchester =

Battle of Winchester may refer to:

- First Battle of Winchester, on May 25, 1862 of Stonewall Jackson's Valley Campaign during the American Civil War
- Second Battle of Winchester, on June 13–15, 1863 as part of the Gettysburg Campaign during the American Civil War
- Third Battle of Winchester, on September 19, 1864, during the Valley Campaigns of 1864, also known as the Battle of Opequon or Battle of Opequon Creek

== See also ==
- Winchester, Virginia, in the Civil War
- Winchester (disambiguation)
