= Battle of Spotsylvania Court House order of battle: Union =

The following Union Army units and commanders fought in the Battle of Spotsylvania Court House (May 8–21, 1864) of the American Civil War. The Confederate order of battle is listed separately. Order of battle compiled from the casualty returns and the reports.

== Abbreviations used ==
=== Military rank ===
- LTG = Lieutenant General
- MG = Major General
- BG = Brigadier General
- Col = Colonel
- Ltc = Lieutenant Colonel
- Maj = Major
- Cpt = Captain

=== Other ===
- w = wounded
- k = killed
- c = captured

== Forces operating against Richmond May 8–16, 1864 ==
LTG Ulysses S. Grant, General-in-Chief, Union armies

Escort:

- 5th United States Cavalry, Companies B, F and K

=== IX Corps ===
MG Ambrose E. Burnside

- Chief of Staff: MG John G. Parke

Division	Brigade	Regiments and Others
First Division BG Thomas G. Stevenson (k); Col Daniel Leasure; MG Thomas L. Crittenden	1st Brigade Col Jacob P. Gould; Ltc Stephen M. Weld, Jr. BG James Ledlie	35th Massachusetts; 56th Massachusetts: Ltc Stephen M. Weld, Jr.; 57th Massachusetts; 59th Massachusetts; 4th United States; 10th United States
First Division BG Thomas G. Stevenson (k); Col Daniel Leasure; MG Thomas L. Crittenden	2nd Brigade Col Daniel Leasure; Ltc Gilbert P. Robinson	3rd Maryland: Ltc Gilbert P. Robinson; 21st Massachusetts; 100th Pennsylvania
First Division BG Thomas G. Stevenson (k); Col Daniel Leasure; MG Thomas L. Crittenden	Artillery	Maine Light, 2nd Battery (B); Massachusetts Light, 14th Battery
Second Division BG Robert B. Potter	1st Brigade Col Zenas Bliss; Col John I. Curtin	36th Massachusetts; 58th Massachusetts; 51st New York; 45th Pennsylvania: Col John I. Curtin; 48th Pennsylvania; 7th Rhode Island
Second Division BG Robert B. Potter	2nd Brigade Col Simon G. Griffin	2nd Maryland (detachment); 31st Maine; 32nd Maine; 6th New Hampshire; 9th New Hampshire; 11th New Hampshire; 17th Vermont
Second Division BG Robert B. Potter	Artillery	Massachusetts Light, 11th Battery; New York Light, 19th Battery
Third Division BG Orlando B. Willcox	1st Brigade Col John F. Hartranft	2nd Michigan: Col William Humphrey; 8th Michigan; 17th Michigan; 27th Michigan; 109th New York; 51st Pennsylvania
Third Division BG Orlando B. Willcox	2nd Brigade Col Benjamin C. Christ; Col William Humphrey	1st Michigan Sharpshooters: Col Charles V. DeLand (w), Maj John Piper (k), Cpt Levant C. Rhines; 20th Michigan; 79th New York; 60th Ohio; 50th Pennsylvania
Third Division BG Orlando B. Willcox	Artillery	Maine Light, 7th Battery (G); New York Light, 34th Battery
Fourth Division BG Edward Ferrero	1st Brigade Col Joshua K. Sigfried	27th United States Colored Troops; 30th United States Colored Troops; 39th United States Colored Troops; 43rd United States Colored Troops
Fourth Division BG Edward Ferrero	2nd Brigade Col Henry G. Thomas	30th Connecticut Colored (detachment); 19th United States Colored Troops; 23rd United States Colored Troops
Fourth Division BG Edward Ferrero	Artillery	Pennsylvania Light, Battery D; Vermont Light, 3rd Battery
Reporting directly	Provost Guard	8th United States
Reporting directly	Cavalry	3rd New Jersey; 22nd New York; 2nd Ohio; 13th Pennsylvania
Reporting directly	Artillery Reserve Cpt John Edwards, Jr.	New York Light, 27th Battery; 1st Rhode Island Light, Battery D; 1st Rhode Island Light, Battery H; 2nd United States, Battery E; 3rd United States, Battery G; 3rd United States, Batteries L and M
Reporting directly	Provisional Brigade Col Elisha G. Marshall	2nd New York Mounted Rifles (dismounted); 14th New York Heavy Artillery; 24th New York Cavalry (dismounted); 2nd Pennsylvania Provisional Heavy Artillery

=== Army of the Potomac ===
MG George G. Meade

General Staff:

- Chief of Staff: MG Andrew A. Humphreys
- Assistant Adjutant General: BG Seth Williams
- Chief Quartermaster: BG Rufus Ingalls

General Headquarters:

Provost Guard: BG Marsena R. Patrick

- 1st Massachusetts Cavalry, Companies C and D
- 80th New York (20th Militia)
- 3rd Pennsylvania Cavalry
- 68th Pennsylvania
- 114th Pennsylvania

Engineer Troops:

- 50th New York Engineers
- Battalion United States Engineers

Guards and Orderlies:

- Independent Company Oneida (New York) Cavalry

==== II Corps ====
MG Winfield S. Hancock

Escort:

- 1st Vermont Cavalry, Company M

Division	Brigade	Regiments and Others
First Division BG Francis C. Barlow	1st Brigade Col Nelson A. Miles	26th Michigan; 61st New York; 81st Pennsylvania: Col H. Boyd McKeen; 140th Pennsylvania; 183rd Pennsylvania
First Division BG Francis C. Barlow	2nd Brigade Col Thomas A. Smyth	28th Massachusetts; 63rd New York; 69th New York; 88th New York; 116th Pennsylvania
First Division BG Francis C. Barlow	3rd Brigade Col Paul Frank; Col Hiram L. Brown (c); Col Clinton D. MacDougall	39th New York; 52nd New York; 111th New York: Col Clinton D. MacDougall; 125th New York; 126th New York
First Division BG Francis C. Barlow	4th Brigade Col John R. Brooke	2nd Delaware; 64th New York; 66th New York; 53rd Pennsylvania; 145th Pennsylvania: Col Hiram L. Brown; 148th Pennsylvania
Second Division BG John Gibbon	1st Brigade BG Alexander S. Webb (w); Col H. Boyd McKeen	19th Maine; 15th Massachusetts; 19th Massachusetts; 20th Massachusetts; 1st Company Massachusetts Sharpshooters; 7th Michigan; 42nd New York; 59th New York; 82nd New York (2nd Militia)
Second Division BG John Gibbon	2nd Brigade BG Joshua T. Owen	152nd New York; 69th Pennsylvania; 71st Pennsylvania; 72nd Pennsylvania; 106th Pennsylvania
Second Division BG John Gibbon	3rd Brigade Col Samuel S. Carroll (w); Col Theodore G. Ellis	14th Connecticut: Col Theodore G. Ellis; 1st Delaware; 14th Indiana; 12th New Jersey; 10th New York Battalion; 108th New York; 4th Ohio; 8th Ohio; 7th West Virginia
Second Division BG John Gibbon	Provost Guard	2nd Company Minnesota Sharpshooters
Third Division MG David B. Birney	1st Brigade BG J. H. Hobart Ward; Col Thomas W. Egan	20th Indiana; 3rd Maine; 40th New York: Col Thomas W. Egan; 86th New York; 124th New York; 99th Pennsylvania; 110th Pennsylvania; 141st Pennsylvania; 2nd United States Sharpshooters
Third Division MG David B. Birney	2nd Brigade Col John S. Crocker	4th Maine; 17th Maine; 3rd Michigan; 5th Michigan; 93rd New York; 57th Pennsylvania; 63rd Pennsylvania: Col William S. Kirkwood (mw), Cpt James F. Ryan; 105th Pennsylvania; 1st United States Sharpshooters
Fourth Division; BG Gershom Mott	1st Brigade Col Robert McAllister	1st Massachusetts; 16th Massachusetts; 5th New Jersey; 6th New Jersey; 7th New Jersey; 8th New Jersey; 11th New Jersey: Col Robert McAllister; 26th Pennsylvania; 115th Pennsylvania
Fourth Division; BG Gershom Mott	2nd Brigade Col William R. Brewster	11th Massachusetts; 70th New York; 71st New York; 72nd New York; 73rd New York; 74th New York; 120th New York; 84th Pennsylvania
	Artillery Brigade Col John C. Tidball	Maine Light, 6th Battery (F); Massachusetts Light, 10th Battery; New Hampshire Light, 1st Battery; 1st New York Light, Battery G; 4th New York Heavy, 3rd Battalion; 1st Pennsylvania Light, Battery F; 1st Rhode Island Light, Battery A; 1st Rhode Island Light, Battery B; 4th United States, Battery K; 5th United States, Batteries C and I

==== V Corps ====
MG Gouverneur K. Warren

Provost Guard:

- 12th New York Battalion

Division	Brigade	Regiments and Others
First Division BG Charles Griffin	1st Brigade BG Romeyn B. Ayres	140th New York: Col George Ryan (k); 146th New York; 91st Pennsylvania; 155th Pennsylvania; 2nd United States, Companies B, C, F, H, I, and K; 11th United States, Companies B, C, D, E, F, and G, 1st Battalion; 12th United States, Companies A, B, C, D, and G, 1st Battalion, and Companies A, C, D, F, and H, 2nd Battalion; 14th United States, 1st Battalion; 17th United States, Companies A, C, D, G, and H, 1st Battalion, and Companies A, B, and C, 2nd Battalion
First Division BG Charles Griffin	2nd Brigade Col Jacob B. Sweitzer	9th Massachusetts; 22nd Massachusetts: Col William S. Tilton; 32nd Massachusetts; 4th Michigan; 62nd Pennsylvania
First Division BG Charles Griffin	3rd Brigade BG Joseph J. Bartlett	20th Maine; 18th Massachusetts; 1st Michigan; 16th Michigan; 44th New York; 83rd Pennsylvania; 118th Pennsylvania
Second Division BG John C. Robinson (w); Col Richard Coulter	1st Brigade Col Peter Lyle	16th Maine; 13th Massachusetts; 39th Massachusetts; 104th New York; 90th Pennsylvania; 107th Pennsylvania
Second Division BG John C. Robinson (w); Col Richard Coulter	2nd Brigade Col Richard Coulter; Col James L. Bates	12th Massachusetts: Col James L. Bates; 83rd New York (9th Militia); 97th New York; 11th Pennsylvania; 88th Pennsylvania
Second Division BG John C. Robinson (w); Col Richard Coulter	3rd Brigade Col Andrew W. Denison (w); Col Charles E. Phelps (c); Col Richard N. Bowerman	1st Maryland; 4th Maryland: Col Richard N. Bowerman; 7th Maryland: Col Charles E. Phelps; 8th Maryland
Third Division BG Samuel W. Crawford	1st Brigade Col William McCandless (w); Col William C. Talley (c); Col Wellington H. Ent; Col Samuel M. Jackson	1st Pennsylvania Reserves: Col William C. Talley; 2nd Pennsylvania Reserves; 6th Pennsylvania Reserves: Col Wellington H. Ent; 11th Pennsylvania Reserves: Col Samuel M. Jackson; 13th Pennsylvania Reserves (1st Rifles)
Third Division BG Samuel W. Crawford	3rd Brigade Col Joseph W. Fisher	5th Pennsylvania Reserves; 8th Pennsylvania Reserves; 10th Pennsylvania Reserves; 12th Pennsylvania Reserves
Fourth Division; BG Lysander Cutler	1st Brigade Col William W. Robinson	7th Indiana; 19th Indiana; 24th Michigan: Ltc William Wight, Maj Albert M. Edwards; 1st New York Battalion Sharpshooters; 2nd Wisconsin; 6th Wisconsin; 7th Wisconsin
Fourth Division; BG Lysander Cutler	2nd Brigade BG James C. Rice (k); Col Edward B. Fowler	76th New York; 84th New York (14th Militia): Col Edward B. Fowler; 95th New York; 147th New York; 56th Pennsylvania
Fourth Division; BG Lysander Cutler	3rd Brigade Col Edward S. Bragg	121st Pennsylvania; 142nd Pennsylvania; 143rd Pennsylvania; 149th Pennsylvania; 150th Pennsylvania
	Artillery Brigade Col Charles S. Wainwright	Massachusetts Light, Battery C; Massachusetts Light, Battery E; 1st New York Light, Battery D; 1st New York Light, Batteries E and L; 1st New York Light, Battery H; 4th New York Heavy, 2nd Battalion; 1st Pennsylvania Light, Battery B; 4th United States, Battery B; 5th United States, Battery D

==== VI Corps ====
MG John Sedgwick (k)
BG Horatio G. Wright
Escort:

- 8th Pennsylvania Cavalry, Company A

Division	Brigade	Regiments and Others
First Division BG Horatio G. Wright; BG David A. Russell	1st Brigade Col Henry W. Brown; Col William H. Penrose	1st New Jersey; 2nd New Jersey: Ltc Charles Wiebecke (k); 3rd New Jersey; 4th New Jersey; 10th New Jersey; 15th New Jersey: Col William H. Penrose
First Division BG Horatio G. Wright; BG David A. Russell	2nd Brigade Col Emory Upton (w)	5th Maine; 121st New York; 95th Pennsylvania Infantry; 96th Pennsylvania
First Division BG Horatio G. Wright; BG David A. Russell	3rd Brigade BG David A. Russell; BG Henry L. Eustis	6th Maine; 49th Pennsylvania; 119th Pennsylvania; 5th Wisconsin
First Division BG Horatio G. Wright; BG David A. Russell	4th Brigade Col Nelson Cross	65th New York; 67th New York; 122nd New York; 82nd Pennsylvania (detachment)
Second Division BG Thomas H. Neill	1st Brigade BG Frank Wheaton	62nd New York; 93rd Pennsylvania; 98th Pennsylvania; 102nd Pennsylvania; 139th Pennsylvania
Second Division BG Thomas H. Neill	2nd Brigade Col Lewis A. Grant	1st Vermont Heavy Artillery; 2nd Vermont; 3rd Vermont; 4th Vermont; 5th Vermont; 6th Vermont
Second Division BG Thomas H. Neill	3rd Brigade Col Daniel D. Bidwell	7th Maine; 43rd New York; 49th New York: Ltc George W. Johnson; 77th New York; 61st Pennsylvania
Second Division BG Thomas H. Neill	4th Brigade BG Henry L. Eustis; Col Oliver Edwards	7th Massachusetts; 10th Massachusetts; 37th Massachusetts: Col Oliver Edwards; 2nd Rhode Island
Third Division BG James B. Ricketts	1st Brigade BG William H. Morris (w); Col John W. Schall; Col William S. Truex	14th New Jersey; 106th New York; 151st New York; 87th Pennsylvania: Col John W. Schall; 10th Vermont
Third Division BG James B. Ricketts	2nd Brigade Col Benjamin F. Smith	6th Maryland; 110th Ohio; 122nd Ohio; 126th Ohio; 67th Pennsylvania; 138th Pennsylvania
	Artillery Brigade Col Charles H. Tompkins	Maine Light, 4th Battery (D); Massachusetts Light, 1st Battery (A); New York Light, 1st Battery; New York Light, 3rd Battery; 4th New York Heavy, 1st Battalion; 1st Rhode Island Light, Battery C; 1st Rhode Island Light, Battery E; 1st Rhode Island Light, Battery G; 5th United States, Battery M

==== Cavalry Corps ====
MG Philip H. Sheridan

Escort:

- 6th United States

Division	Brigade	Regiments and Others
First Division; BG Wesley Merritt	1st Brigade BG George A. Custer	1st Michigan; 5th Michigan; 6th Michigan; 7th Michigan
First Division; BG Wesley Merritt	2nd Brigade Col Thomas C. Devin	4th New York; 6th New York; 9th New York; 17th Pennsylvania
First Division; BG Wesley Merritt	Reserve Brigade Col Alfred Gibbs	19th New York; 6th Pennsylvania; 1st United States; 2nd United States; 5th United States
Second Division; BG David M. Gregg	1st Brigade BG Henry E. Davies, Jr.	1st Massachusetts; 1st New Jersey; 6th Ohio; 1st Pennsylvania
Second Division; BG David M. Gregg	2nd Brigade Col J. Irvin Gregg	1st Maine; 10th New York; 2nd Pennsylvania; 4th Pennsylvania; 8th Pennsylvania; 16th Pennsylvania
Third Division; BG James H. Wilson	1st Brigade Col John B. McIntosh	1st Connecticut; 2nd New York; 5th New York; 18th Pennsylvania
Third Division; BG James H. Wilson	2nd Brigade Col George H. Chapman	3rd Indiana; 8th New York; 1st Vermont
	1st Brigade Horse Artillery Cpt James M. Robertson	New York Light, 6th Battery; 2nd United States, Batteries B and L; 2nd United States, Battery D; 2nd United States, Battery M; 4th United States, Battery A; 4th United States, Batteries C and E

==== Artillery ====
BG Henry J. Hunt

Division	Brigade	Regiments and Others
Artillery Reserve; Col Henry S. Burton	1st Brigade Col J. Howard Kitching	6th New York Heavy; 15th New York Heavy, 1st and 3rd Battalions
Artillery Reserve; Col Henry S. Burton	2nd Brigade Maj John A. Tompkins	Maine Light, 5th Battery (E); 1st New Jersey Light, Battery A; 1st New Jersey Light, Battery B; New York Light, 5th Battery; New York Light, 12th Battery; 1st New York Light, Battery B
Artillery Reserve; Col Henry S. Burton	3rd Brigade Maj Robert H. Fitzhugh	Massachusetts Light, 9th Battery; New York Light, 15th Battery; 1st New York Light, Battery C; New York Light, 11th Battery; 1st Ohio Light, Battery H; 5th United States, Battery E
Artillery Reserve; Col Henry S. Burton	2nd Brigade Horse Artillery Cpt Dunbar R. Ransom	1st United States, Batteries E and G; 1st United States, Batteries H and I; 1st United States, Battery K; 2nd United States, Battery A; 2nd United States, Battery G; 3rd United States, Batteries C, F, and K
Artillery Reserve; Col Henry S. Burton	Artillery Park Ltc Freeman McGilvery	15th New York Heavy, 2nd Battalion

== Forces operating against Richmond May 17–21, 1864 ==
LTG Ulysses S. Grant, General-in-Chief, Union armies

Escort:

- 5th United States Cavalry, Companies B, F and K

=== IX Corps ===
MG Ambrose E. Burnside

- Chief of Staff: MG John G. Parke

Division	Brigade	Regiments and Others
First Division MG Thomas L. Crittenden	1st Brigade BG James Ledlie	35th Massachusetts; 56th Massachusetts: Ltc Stephen M. Weld, Jr.; 57th Massachusetts; 59th Massachusetts; 4th United States; 10th United States
First Division MG Thomas L. Crittenden	2nd Brigade Ltc Gilbert P. Robinson	3rd Maryland; 21st Massachusetts; 100th Pennsylvania
First Division MG Thomas L. Crittenden	Provisional Brigade Col Elisha G. Marshall	2nd New York Mounted Rifles (dismounted); 14th New York Heavy Artillery; 24th New York Cavalry (dismounted); 2nd Pennsylvania Provisional Heavy Artillery
First Division MG Thomas L. Crittenden	Artillery	Maine Light, 2nd Battery (B); Massachusetts Light, 14th Battery
Second Division BG Robert B. Potter	1st Brigade Col John I. Curtin	36th Massachusetts; 58th Massachusetts; 51st New York; 45th Pennsylvania; 48th Pennsylvania; 7th Rhode Island
Second Division BG Robert B. Potter	2nd Brigade Col Simon G. Griffin	2nd Maryland (detachment); 31st Maine; 32nd Maine; 6th New Hampshire; 9th New Hampshire; 11th New Hampshire; 17th Vermont
Second Division BG Robert B. Potter	Artillery	Massachusetts Light, 11th Battery; New York Light, 19th Battery
Third Division BG Orlando B. Willcox	1st Brigade Col John F. Hartranft	2nd Michigan; 8th Michigan; 17th Michigan; 27th Michigan; 109th New York; 51st Pennsylvania
Third Division BG Orlando B. Willcox	2nd Brigade Col William Humphrey	1st Michigan Sharpshooters: Cpt Levant C. Rhines; 20th Michigan; 60th Ohio; 50th Pennsylvania
Third Division BG Orlando B. Willcox	Artillery	Maine Light, 7th Battery (G); New York Light, 34th Battery
Fourth Division BG Edward Ferrero	1st Brigade Col Joshua K. Sigfried	27th United States Colored Troops; 30th United States Colored Troops; 39th United States Colored Troops; 43rd United States Colored Troops
Fourth Division BG Edward Ferrero	2nd Brigade Col Henry G. Thomas	30th Connecticut Colored (detachment); 19th United States Colored Troops; 23rd United States Colored Troops
Fourth Division BG Edward Ferrero	Artillery	Pennsylvania Light, Battery D; Vermont Light, 3rd Battery
Reporting directly	Provost Guard	8th United States
Reporting directly	Cavalry	3rd New Jersey; 22nd New York; 2nd Ohio

=== Army of the Potomac ===
MG George G. Meade

General Staff:

- Chief of Staff: MG Andrew A. Humphreys
- Assistant Adjutant General: BG Seth Williams
- Chief Quartermaster: BG Rufus Ingalls

General Headquarters:

Provost Guard: BG Marsena R. Patrick

- 1st Massachusetts Cavalry, Companies C and D
- 80th New York (20th Militia)
- 3rd Pennsylvania Cavalry
- 68th Pennsylvania
- 114th Pennsylvania

Engineer Troops:

- 50th New York Engineers
- Battalion United States Engineers

Guards and Orderlies:

- Independent Company Oneida (New York) Cavalry

==== II Corps ====
MG Winfield S. Hancock

Escort:

- 1st Vermont Cavalry, Company M

Division	Brigade	Regiments and Others
First Division BG Francis C. Barlow	1st Brigade Col Nelson A. Miles	26th Michigan; 61st New York; 81st Pennsylvania; 140th Pennsylvania; 183rd Pennsylvania
First Division BG Francis C. Barlow	2nd Brigade Col Thomas A. Smyth; Col Richard Byrnes	28th Massachusetts: Col Richard Byrnes; 63rd New York; 69th New York; 88th New York; 116th Pennsylvania
First Division BG Francis C. Barlow	3rd Brigade Col Clinton D. MacDougall	39th New York; 52nd New York; 111th New York; 125th New York; 126th New York
First Division BG Francis C. Barlow	4th Brigade Col John R. Brooke	2nd Delaware; 64th New York; 66th New York; 53rd Pennsylvania; 145th Pennsylvania; 148th Pennsylvania
Second Division BG John Gibbon	1st Brigade Col H. Boyd McKeen	19th Maine; 15th Massachusetts; 19th Massachusetts; 20th Massachusetts; 1st Company Massachusetts Sharpshooters; 7th Michigan; 42nd New York; 59th New York; 82nd New York (2nd Militia); 36th Wisconsin
Second Division BG John Gibbon	2nd Brigade BG Joshua T. Owen	152nd New York; 69th Pennsylvania; 71st Pennsylvania; 72nd Pennsylvania; 106th Pennsylvania
Second Division BG John Gibbon	3rd Brigade Col Theodore G. Ellis; Col Thomas A. Smyth	14th Connecticut: Col Theodore G. Ellis; 1st Delaware; 14th Indiana; 12th New Jersey; 10th New York Battalion; 108th New York; 4th Ohio; 8th Ohio; 7th West Virginia
Second Division BG John Gibbon	4th Brigade Col Mathew Murphy (w); Col James P. McIvor	155th New York; 164th New York; 170th New York: Col James P. McIvor; 182nd New York
Second Division BG John Gibbon	Provost Guard	2nd Company Minnesota Sharpshooters
Third Division MG David B. Birney	1st Brigade Col Thomas W. Egan	20th Indiana; 3rd Maine; 40th New York; 86th New York; 124th New York; 99th Pennsylvania; 110th Pennsylvania; 141st Pennsylvania; 2nd United States Sharpshooters
Third Division MG David B. Birney	2nd Brigade Col John S. Crocker; Col Elijah Walker	4th Maine: Col Elijah Walker; 17th Maine; 3rd Michigan; 5th Michigan; 93rd New York: Col John S. Crocker; 57th Pennsylvania; 63rd Pennsylvania; 105th Pennsylvania; 1st United States Sharpshooters
Third Division MG David B. Birney	3rd Brigade BG Gershom Mott	1st Massachusetts; 16th Massachusetts; 5th New Jersey; 6th New Jersey; 7th New Jersey; 8th New Jersey; 11th New Jersey; 26th Pennsylvania; 115th Pennsylvania
Third Division MG David B. Birney	4th Brigade Col William R. Brewster	11th Massachusetts; 70th New York; 71st New York; 72nd New York; 73rd New York; 74th New York; 120th New York; 84th Pennsylvania
Fourth Division; BG Robert O. Tyler	no brigade organization	1st Maine Heavy Artillery; 1st Massachusetts Heavy Artillery; 2nd New York Heavy Artillery; 7th New York Heavy Artillery; 8th New York Heavy Artillery
	Artillery Brigade Col John C. Tidball	Maine Light, 6th Battery (F); Massachusetts Light, 10th Battery; New Hampshire Light, 1st Battery; 1st New Jersey Light, Battery B; 1st New York Light, Battery G; 4th New York Heavy, 3rd Battalion; New York Light, 11th Battery; New York Light, 12th Battery; 1st Pennsylvania Light, Battery F; 1st Rhode Island Light, Battery A; 1st Rhode Island Light, Battery B; 4th United States, Battery K; 5th United States, Batteries C and I

==== V Corps ====
MG Gouverneur K. Warren

Provost Guard:

- 12th New York Battalion

Division	Brigade	Regiments and Others
First Division BG Charles Griffin	1st Brigade BG Romeyn B. Ayres	140th New York; 146th New York; 91st Pennsylvania; 155th Pennsylvania; 2nd United States, Companies B, C, F, H, I, and K; 11th United States, Companies B, C, D, E, F, and G, 1st Battalion; 12th United States, Companies A, B, C, D, and G, 1st Battalion, and Companies A, C, D, F, and H, 2nd Battalion; 14th United States, 1st Battalion; 17th United States, Companies A, C, D, G, and H, 1st Battalion, and Companies A, B, and C, 2nd Battalion
First Division BG Charles Griffin	2nd Brigade Col Jacob B. Sweitzer	9th Massachusetts; 22nd Massachusetts; 32nd Massachusetts; 4th Michigan; 62nd Pennsylvania
First Division BG Charles Griffin	3rd Brigade BG Joseph J. Bartlett	20th Maine; 18th Massachusetts; 1st Michigan; 16th Michigan; 44th New York; 83rd Pennsylvania; 118th Pennsylvania
Third Division BG Samuel W. Crawford	1st Brigade Col Samuel M. Jackson; Col Martin Davis Hardin	1st Pennsylvania Reserves; 2nd Pennsylvania Reserves; 6th Pennsylvania Reserves; 7th Pennsylvania Reserves; 11th Pennsylvania Reserves: Col Samuel M. Jackson; 13th Pennsylvania Reserves (1st Rifles)
Third Division BG Samuel W. Crawford	2nd Brigade Col Richard Coulter (w); Col James L. Bates	12th Massachusetts: Col James L. Bates; 83rd New York (9th Militia); 97th New York; 11th Pennsylvania; 88th Pennsylvania
Third Division BG Samuel W. Crawford	3rd Brigade Col Joseph W. Fisher	5th Pennsylvania Reserves; 10th Pennsylvania Reserves; 12th Pennsylvania Reserves
Fourth Division; BG Lysander Cutler	1st Brigade Col William W. Robinson	7th Indiana; 19th Indiana; 24th Michigan; 1st New York Battalion Sharpshooters; 6th Wisconsin; 7th Wisconsin
Fourth Division; BG Lysander Cutler	2nd Brigade Col Edward B. Fowler; Col William Hofmann	76th New York; 84th New York (14th Militia); 95th New York; 147th New York; 56th Pennsylvania: Col William Hofmann
Fourth Division; BG Lysander Cutler	3rd Brigade Col Edward S. Bragg	121st Pennsylvania; 142nd Pennsylvania; 143rd Pennsylvania; 149th Pennsylvania; 150th Pennsylvania
Fourth Division; BG Lysander Cutler	4th Brigade Col Peter Lyle	16th Maine; 13th Massachusetts; 39th Massachusetts; 104th New York; 90th Pennsylvania; 107th Pennsylvania
Fourth Division; BG Lysander Cutler	Provost Guard	2nd Wisconsin
Reporting directly	Heavy Artillery Brigade Col J. Howard Kitching	6th New York Heavy Artillery; 15th New York Heavy Artillery, 1st and 3rd Battalions
Reporting directly	Maryland Brigade Col Richard N. Bowerman	1st Maryland; 4th Maryland; 7th Maryland; 8th Maryland
	Artillery Brigade Col Charles S. Wainwright	Massachusetts Light, Battery C; Massachusetts Light, Battery E; Massachusetts Light, 9th Battery; 1st New York Light, Battery B; 1st New York Light, Battery C; 1st New York Light, Battery D; 1st New York Light, Batteries E and L; 1st New York Light, Battery H; New York Light, 5th Battery; New York Light, 15th Battery; 4th New York Heavy, 2nd Battalion; 1st Pennsylvania Light, Battery B; 4th United States, Battery B; 5th United States, Battery D

==== VI Corps ====
BG Horatio G. Wright
Escort:

- 8th Pennsylvania Cavalry, Company A

Division	Brigade	Regiments and Others
First Division BG David A. Russell	1st Brigade Col William H. Penrose	1st New Jersey; 2nd New Jersey; 3rd New Jersey; 4th New Jersey; 10th New Jersey; 15th New Jersey
First Division BG David A. Russell	2nd Brigade Col Emory Upton	2nd Connecticut Heavy Artillery; 5th Maine; 121st New York; 95th Pennsylvania Infantry; 96th Pennsylvania
First Division BG David A. Russell	3rd Brigade BG Henry L. Eustis	6th Maine; 49th Pennsylvania; 119th Pennsylvania; 5th Wisconsin
First Division BG David A. Russell	4th Brigade Col Nelson Cross	65th New York; 67th New York; 122nd New York; 82nd Pennsylvania (detachment)
Second Division BG Thomas H. Neill	1st Brigade BG Frank Wheaton	62nd New York; 93rd Pennsylvania; 98th Pennsylvania; 102nd Pennsylvania; 139th Pennsylvania
Second Division BG Thomas H. Neill	2nd Brigade Col Lewis A. Grant	1st Vermont Heavy Artillery; 2nd Vermont; 3rd Vermont; 4th Vermont; 5th Vermont; 6th Vermont
Second Division BG Thomas H. Neill	3rd Brigade Col Daniel D. Bidwell	7th Maine; 43rd New York; 49th New York; 77th New York; 61st Pennsylvania
Second Division BG Thomas H. Neill	4th Brigade Col Oliver Edwards	7th Massachusetts; 10th Massachusetts; 37th Massachusetts; 2nd Rhode Island
Third Division BG James B. Ricketts	1st Brigade Col William S. Truex	14th New Jersey; 106th New York; 151st New York; 87th Pennsylvania; 10th Vermont
Third Division BG James B. Ricketts	2nd Brigade Col Benjamin F. Smith	6th Maryland; 110th Ohio; 122nd Ohio; 126th Ohio; 67th Pennsylvania; 138th Pennsylvania
	Artillery Brigade Col Charles H. Tompkins	Maine Light, 4th Battery (D); Maine Light, 5th Battery (E); Massachusetts Light, 1st Battery (A); 1st New Jersey Light, Battery A; New York Light, 1st Battery; New York Light, 3rd Battery; 4th New York Heavy, 1st Battalion; 1st Ohio Light, Battery H; 1st Rhode Island Light, Battery C; 1st Rhode Island Light, Battery E; 1st Rhode Island Light, Battery G; 5th United States, Battery E; 5th United States, Battery M

==== Cavalry ====
Brigade	Regiments and Others
Torbert's Command BG Alfred T. A. Torbert	5th New York; 1st Pennsylvania (detachment); 13th Pennsylvania; 16th Pennsylvania (detachment); 1st Massachusetts (detachment)

==== Artillery ====
Division	Brigade	Regiments and Others
Artillery; BG Henry J. Hunt	2nd Brigade Horse Artillery Cpt Dunbar R. Ransom	1st United States, Batteries E and G; 1st United States, Batteries H and I; 1st United States, Battery K; 2nd United States, Battery A; 2nd United States, Battery G; 3rd United States, Batteries C, F, and K
Artillery; BG Henry J. Hunt	Artillery Park Ltc Freeman McGilvery	15th New York Heavy, 2nd Battalion

== See also ==
- Wilderness Union order of battle
- Cold Harbor Union order of battle
