= Battle of the Wilderness order of battle: Union =

The following Union Army units and commanders fought in the Battle of the Wilderness (May 5–7, 1864) of the American Civil War. The Confederate order of battle is listed separately. Order of battle compiled from the army organization May 5, 1864, the casualty returns and the reports.

== Abbreviations used ==
=== Military rank ===
- LTG = Lieutenant General
- MG = Major General
- BG = Brigadier General
- Col = Colonel
- Ltc = Lieutenant Colonel
- Maj = Major
- Cpt = Captain
- Lt = 1st Lieutenant

=== Other ===
- w = wounded
- mw = mortally wounded
- k = killed
- c = captured

== Forces operating against Richmond ==
LTG Ulysses S. Grant, General-in-Chief, Union Armies

Escort:

- 5th United States Cavalry, Companies B, F and K: Cpt Julius W. Mason

=== IX Corps ===
MG Ambrose Burnside

- Chief of Staff: MG John G. Parke

| Division | Brigade | Regiments and Others |
|---|---|---|
| First Division; BG Thomas G. Stevenson | 1st Brigade Col Sumner Carruth; Col Jacob P. Gould | 35th Massachusetts: Maj Nathaniel Wales; 56th Massachusetts: Col Charles E. Griswold (k); 57th Massachusetts: Col William F. Bartlett (w); 59th Massachusetts: Col Jacob P. Gould; 4th United States: Cpt Charles H. Brightly (mw); 10th United States: Maj Samuel B. Hayman (w) |
| First Division; BG Thomas G. Stevenson | 2nd Brigade Col Daniel Leasure | 3rd Maryland: Col Joseph M. Sudsburg; 21st Massachusetts: Ltc George P. Hawkes; 100th Pennsylvania: Ltc Matthew M. Dawson |
| First Division; BG Thomas G. Stevenson | Artillery | Maine Light, 2nd Battery (B): Cpt Albert F. Thomas; Massachusetts Light, 14th Battery: Cpt Joseph W. B. Wright |
| Second Division; BG Robert B. Potter | 1st Brigade Col Zenas Bliss; Col John I. Curtin | 36th Massachusetts: Maj William F. Draper; 58th Massachusetts: Ltc John C. Whiton; 51st New York: Col Charles Le Gendre (w); 45th Pennsylvania: Col John I. Curtin; 48th Pennsylvania: Ltc Henry Pleasants; 7th Rhode Island: Cpt Theodore Winn |
| Second Division; BG Robert B. Potter | 2nd Brigade Col Simon G. Griffin | 31st Maine: Ltc Thomas Hight; 32nd Maine: Maj Arthur Deering; 6th New Hampshire: Ltc Henry H. Pearson; 9th New Hampshire: Ltc John W. Babbitt; 11th New Hampshire: Col Walter Harriman (c) Ltc Moses Collins (k); 17th Vermont: Ltc Charles Cummings (w), Maj William B. Reynolds |
| Second Division; BG Robert B. Potter | Artillery | Massachusetts Light, 11th Battery: Cpt Edward J. Jones; New York Light, 19th Battery: Cpt Edward W. Rogers |
| Third Division; BG Orlando B. Willcox | 1st Brigade Col John F. Hartranft | 2nd Michigan: Col William Humphrey; 8th Michigan: Col Frank Graves (k); 17th Michigan: Col Constant Luce; 27th Michigan: Maj Samuel Moody (w); 109th New York: Col Benjamin F. Tracy; 51st Pennsylvania: Ltc Edwin Schall |
| Third Division; BG Orlando B. Willcox | 2nd Brigade Col Benjamin C. Christ | 1st Michigan Sharpshooters: Col Charles V. DeLand; 20th Michigan: Ltc Byron M. Cutcheon; 79th New York: Col David Morrison; 60th Ohio: Ltc James N. McElroy; 50th Pennsylvania: Ltc Edward Overton, Jr. |
| Third Division; BG Orlando B. Willcox | Artillery | Maine Light, 7th Battery (G): Cpt Adelbert B. Twitchell; New York Light, 34th Battery: Cpt Jacob Roemer |
| Fourth Division; BG Edward Ferrero | 1st Brigade Col Joshua K. Sigfried | 27th United States Colored Troops: Ltc Charles J. Wright; 30th United States Colored Troops: Col Delavan Bates; 39th United States Colored Troops: Col Ozora P. Stearns; 43rd United States Colored Troops: Ltc H. Seymour Hall |
| Fourth Division; BG Edward Ferrero | 2nd Brigade Col Henry G. Thomas | 30th Connecticut Colored (detachment): Cpt Charles Robinson; 19th United States Colored Troops: Ltc Joseph G. Perkins; 23rd United States Colored Troops: Ltc Cleaveland J. Campbell |
| Fourth Division; BG Edward Ferrero | Artillery | Pennsylvania Light, Battery D: Cpt George W. Durell; Vermont Light, 3rd Battery: Cpt Romeo H. Start |
| Reporting directly | Provost Guard | 8th United States: Cpt Milton Cogswell |
| Reporting directly | Cavalry | 3rd New Jersey: Col Andrew J. Morrison; 22nd New York: Col Samuel J. Crooks; 2nd Ohio: Ltc George A. Purington; 13th Pennsylvania: Maj Michael Kerwin |
| Reporting directly | Reserve Artillery Cpt John Edwards, Jr. | New York Light, 27th Battery: Cpt John B. Eaton; 1st Rhode Island Light, Battery D: Cpt William W. Buckley; 1st Rhode Island Light, Battery H: Cpt Crawford Allen, Jr.; 2nd United States, Battery E: Lt James S. Dudley; 3rd United States, Battery G: Lt Edmund Pendleton; 3rd United States, Batteries L and M: Lt Erskine Gittings |
| Reporting directly | Provisional Brigade Col Elisha Marshall | 24th New York Cavalry (dismounted): Col William C. Raulston; 14th New York Heavy Artillery: Ltc Clarence H. Corning; 2nd Pennsylvania Provisional Heavy Artillery: Col Thomas Wilhelm |

=== Army of the Potomac ===
MG George Meade

General Staff:

- Chief of Staff: MG Andrew A. Humphreys
- Assistant Adjutant General: BG Seth Williams
- Chief Quartermaster: BG Rufus Ingalls

General Headquarters:

Provost Guard: BG Marsena R. Patrick

- 1st Massachusetts Cavalry, Companies C and D: Cpt Edward A. Flint
- 80th New York (20th Militia): Col Theodore B. Gates
- 3rd Pennsylvania Cavalry: Maj James W. Walsh
- 68th Pennsylvania: Ltc Robert E. Winslow
- 114th Pennsylvania: Col Charles H. T. Collis

Engineer Troops:

- 50th New York Engineers (11 Companies): Ltc Ira Spaulding
- Battalion United States Engineers: Cpt George H. Mendell

Guards and Orderlies:

- Independent Company Oneida (New York) Cavalry: Cpt Daniel P. Mann

==== II Corps ====
MG Winfield S. Hancock

Escort:

- 1st Vermont Cavalry, Company M: Cpt John H. Hazelton

| Division | Brigade | Regiments and Others |
|---|---|---|
| First Division; BG Francis C. Barlow | 1st Brigade Col Nelson A. Miles | 26th Michigan: Maj Lemuel Saviers; 61st New York: Ltc K. Oscar Broady; 81st Pennsylvania: Col H. Boyd McKeen; 140th Pennsylvania: Col John Fraser; 183rd Pennsylvania: Col George P. McLean |
| First Division; BG Francis C. Barlow | 2nd Brigade Col Thomas A. Smyth | 28th Massachusetts: Ltc George W. Cartwright; 63rd New York: Maj Thomas Touhy (mw); 69th New York: Cpt Richard Moroney; 88th New York: Cpt Denis F. Burke; 116th Pennsylvania: Ltc Richard C. Dale |
| First Division; BG Francis C. Barlow | 3rd Brigade Col Paul Frank | 39th New York: Col Augustus Funk (w) Ltc James Hughes (w); 52nd New York: Maj Henry M. Karples; 57th New York: Ltc Alford B. Chapman (k); 111th New York: Cpt Aaron P. Seeley (w); 125th New York: Ltc Aaron B. Myer (mw); 126th New York: Cpt Winfield Scott |
| First Division; BG Francis C. Barlow | 4th Brigade Col John R. Brooke | 2nd Delaware: Col William P. Bailey; 64th New York: Maj Leman W. Bradley; 66th New York: Ltc John S. Hammell; 53rd Pennsylvania: Ltc Richards McMichael; 145th Pennsylvania: Col Hiram L. Brown; 148th Pennsylvania: Col James A. Beaver |
| Second Division; BG John Gibbon | 1st Brigade BG Alexander S. Webb | 19th Maine: Col Selden Connor; 1st Company Massachusetts Sharpshooters: Lt Samuel G. Gilbreth; 15th Massachusetts: Maj I. Harris Hooper; 19th Massachusetts: Maj Edmund Rice; 20th Massachusetts: Col George N. Macy (w), Maj Henry L. Abbott (mw); 7th Michigan: Maj Sylvanus W. Curtis; 42nd New York: Maj Patrick J. Downing; 59th New York: Cpt William McFadden; 82nd New York: Col Henry W. Hudson |
| Second Division; BG John Gibbon | 2nd Brigade BG Joshua T. Owen | 152nd New York: Ltc George W. Thompson; 69th Pennsylvania: Maj William Davis; 71st Pennsylvania: Ltc Charles Kochersperger; 72nd Pennsylvania: Col De Witt C. Baxter; 106th Pennsylvania: Cpt Robert H. Ford |
| Second Division; BG John Gibbon | 3rd Brigade Col Samuel S. Carroll (w) | 14th Connecticut: Col Theodore G. Ellis; 1st Delaware: Ltc Daniel Woodall; 14th Indiana: Col John Coons; 12th New Jersey: Ltc Thomas H. Davis; 10th New York Battalion: Cpt George M. Dewey (w); 108th New York: Col Charles J. Powers (w); 4th Ohio: Ltc Leonard W. Carpenter; 8th Ohio: Ltc Franklin Sawyer; 7th West Virginia: Ltc Jonathan H. Lockwood |
| Second Division; BG John Gibbon | Provost Guard | 2nd Company Minnesota Sharpshooters: Cpt Mahlon Black |
| Third Division; MG David B. Birney | 1st Brigade BG J. H. Hobart Ward | 20th Indiana: Col William C. L. Taylor; 3rd Maine: Col Moses B. Lakeman; 40th New York: Col Thomas W. Egan; 86th New York: Ltc Jacob H. Lansing; 124th New York: Col Francis M. Cummins (w); 99th Pennsylvania: Ltc Edwin R. Biles; 110th Pennsylvania: Ltc Isaac Rodgers; 141st Pennsylvania: Ltc Guy H. Watkins; 2nd United States Sharpshooters: Ltc Homer R. Stoughton |
| Third Division; MG David B. Birney | 2nd Brigade BG Alexander Hays (k); Col John S. Crocker | 4th Maine: Col Elijah Walker; 17th Maine: Col George W. West; 3rd Michigan: Col Byron R. Pierce; 5th Michigan: Ltc John Pulford; 93rd New York: Col John S. Crocker, Maj Samuel McConihe; 57th Pennsylvania: Col Peter Sides; 63rd Pennsylvania: Ltc John A. Danks, Maj George B. McCullough (k); 105th Pennsylvania: Col Calvin A. Craig (w) Ltc J. W. Greenawalt (mw); 1st United States Sharpshooters: Maj Charles P. Mattocks |
| Fourth Division; BG Gershom Mott | 1st Brigade Col Robert McAllister | 1st Massachusetts: Col Napoleon B. McLaughlen; 16th Massachusetts: Ltc Waldo Merriam; 5th New Jersey: Col William J. Sewell; 6th New Jersey: Ltc Stephen R. Gilkyson; 7th New Jersey: Maj Frederick Cooper; 8th New Jersey: Col John Ramsey; 11th New Jersey: Ltc John Schoonover; 26th Pennsylvania: Maj Samuel G. Moffett; 115th Pennsylvania: Maj William A. Reilly |
| Fourth Division; BG Gershom Mott | 2nd Brigade Col William R. Brewster | 11th Massachusetts: Col William E. Blaisdell; 70th New York: Cpt William H. Hugo; 71st New York: Ltc Thomas Rafferty; 72nd New York: Ltc John Leonard; 73rd New York: Ltc Michael W. Burns; 74th New York: Col Thomas Holt; 120th New York: Cpt Abram L. Lockwood; 84th Pennsylvania: Ltc Milton Opp (mw) |
| | Artillery Brigade Col John C. Tidball | Maine Light, 6th Battery (F): Cpt Edwin B. Dow; Massachusetts Light, 10th Battery: Cpt J. Henry Sleeper; New Hampshire Light, 1st Battery: Cpt Frederick M. Edgell; 1st New York Light, Battery G: Cpt Nelson Ames; 4th New York Heavy, 3rd Battalion: Ltc Thomas Allcock; 1st Pennsylvania Light, Battery F: Cpt R. Bruce Ricketts; 1st Rhode Island Light, Battery A: Cpt William A. Arnold; 1st Rhode Island Light, Battery B: Cpt Thomas F. Brown; 4th United States, Battery K: Lt John W. Roder; 5th United States, Battery C and I: Lt James Gilliss |

==== V Corps ====
MG Gouverneur K. Warren

Provost Guard:

- 12th New York Battalion: Maj Henry W. Ryder

| Division | Brigade | Regiments and Others |
|---|---|---|
| First Division; BG Charles Griffin | 1st Brigade BG Romeyn B. Ayres | 140th New York: Col George Ryan; 146th New York: Col David T. Jenkins (k), Maj Henry H. Curran (k); 91st Pennsylvania: Ltc Joseph H. Sinex; 155th Pennsylvania: Ltc Alfred L. Pearson; 2nd United States, Companies B, C, F, H, I, and K: Cpt James W. Long; 11th United States, Companies B, C, D, E, F, and G, First Battalion: Cpt Francis M. Cooley; 12th United States, Companies A, B, C, D, and G, 1st Battalion, and Companies A, C, D, F, and H, 2nd Battalion: Maj Luther B. Bruen; 14th United States, 1st Battalion: Cpt Edward McK. Hudson (w); 17th United States, Companies A, C, D, G, and H, 1st Battalion, and Companies A, B, and C, 2nd Battalion: Cpt James F. Grimes |
| First Division; BG Charles Griffin | 2nd Brigade Col Jacob B. Sweitzer | 9th Massachusetts: Col Patrick R. Guiney; 22nd Massachusetts: Col William S. Tilton; 32nd Massachusetts: Col George L. Prescott; 4th Michigan: Ltc George W. Lumbard (mw); 62nd Pennsylvania: Ltc James C. Hull |
| First Division; BG Charles Griffin | 3rd Brigade BG Joseph J. Bartlett | 20th Maine: Maj Ellis Spear; 18th Massachusetts: Col Joseph Hayes; 1st Michigan: Ltc William A. Throop; 16th Michigan: Maj Robert T. Elliott; 44th New York: Ltc Freeman Conner; 83rd Pennsylvania: Col Orpheus S. Woodward (w); 118th Pennsylvania: Col James Gwyn (w) |
| Second Division; BG John C. Robinson | 1st Brigade Col Samuel H. Leonard; Col Peter Lyle | 16th Maine: Col Charles W. Tilden; 13th Massachusetts: Cpt Charles H. Hovey; 39th Massachusetts: Col Phineas S. Davis; 104th New York: Col Gilbert G. Prey |
| Second Division; BG John C. Robinson | 2nd Brigade BG Henry Baxter (w); Col Richard Coulter | 12th Massachusetts: Col James L. Bates; 83rd New York (9th Militia): Col Joseph A. Moesch (k); 97th New York: Col Charles Wheelock (w), Maj Charles B. Northrup (w); 11th Pennsylvania: Col Richard Coulter; 88th Pennsylvania: Cpt George B. Rhoads; 90th Pennsylvania: Col Peter Lyle |
| Second Division; BG John C. Robinson | 3rd Brigade Col Andrew W. Denison | 1st Maryland: Maj Benjamin H. Schley; 4th Maryland: Col Richard N. Bowerman; 7th Maryland: Col Charles E. Phelps; 8th Maryland: Ltc John G. Johannes |
| Third Division; BG Samuel W. Crawford | 1st Brigade Col William McCandless (w) | 1st Pennsylvania Reserves: Col William C. Talley; 2nd Pennsylvania Reserves: Ltc Patrick McDonough; 6th Pennsylvania Reserves: Col Wellington H. Ent; 7th Pennsylvania Reserves: Maj LeGrand B. Speece; 11th Pennsylvania Reserves: Col Samuel M. Jackson; 13th Pennsylvania Reserves (1st Rifles): Maj William R. Hartshorne |
| Third Division; BG Samuel W. Crawford | 3rd Brigade Col Joseph W. Fisher | 5th Pennsylvania Reserves: Ltc George Dare (k); 8th Pennsylvania Reserves: Col Silas M. Baily; 10th Pennsylvania Reserves: Ltc Ira Ayer, Jr. (w); 12th Pennsylvania Reserves: Ltc Richard Gustin |
| Fourth Division; BG James S. Wadsworth (mw); BG Lysander Cutler | 1st Brigade BG Lysander Cutler; Col William W. Robinson | 7th Indiana: Col Ira G. Grover (c); 19th Indiana: Col Samuel J. Williams (k); 24th Michigan: Col Henry A. Morrow (w), Ltc William Wight; 1st New York Battalion Sharpshooters: Cpt Volney J. Shipman; 2nd Wisconsin: Ltc John Mansfield (c); 6th Wisconsin: Col Edward S. Bragg; 7th Wisconsin: Col William W. Robinson |
| Fourth Division; BG James S. Wadsworth (mw); BG Lysander Cutler | 2nd Brigade BG James C. Rice | 76th New York: Ltc John E. Cook (w); 84th New York (14th Militia): Col Edward B. Fowler; 95th New York: Col Edward Pye; 147th New York: Col Francis C. Miller (w&c); 56th Pennsylvania: Col William Hofmann |
| Fourth Division; BG James S. Wadsworth (mw); BG Lysander Cutler | 3rd Brigade Col Roy Stone; Col Edward S. Bragg | 121st Pennsylvania: Cpt Samuel T. Lloyd; 142nd Pennsylvania: Maj Horatio N. Warren; 143rd Pennsylvania: Col Edmund L. Dana; 149th Pennsylvania: Ltc John Irvin; 150th Pennsylvania: Cpt George W. Jones |
| | Artillery Brigade Col Charles S. Wainwright | Massachusetts Light, Battery C: Cpt Augustus P. Martin; Massachusetts Light, Battery E: Cpt Charles A. Phillips; 1st New York Light, Battery D: Cpt George B. Winslow (w); 1st New York Light, Batteries E and L: Lt George Breck; 1st New York Light, Battery H: Cpt Charles E. Mink; 4th New York Heavy, 2nd Battalion: Maj William Arthur; 1st Pennsylvania Light, Battery B: Cpt James H. Cooper; 4th United States, Battery B: Lt James Stewart; 5th United States, Battery D: Lt Benjamin F. Rittenhouse |

==== VI Corps ====
MG John Sedgwick

Escort:

- 8th Pennsylvania Cavalry, Company A: Cpt Charles E. Fellows

| Division | Brigade | Regiments and Others |
|---|---|---|
| First Division; BG Horatio Wright | 1st Brigade Col Henry W. Brown | 1st New Jersey: Ltc William Henry, Jr.; 2nd New Jersey: Ltc Charles Wiebecke; 3rd New Jersey: Cpt Samuel T. DuBois; 4th New Jersey: Ltc Charles Ewing; 10th New Jersey: Col Henry O. Ryerson (k); 15th New Jersey: Col William H. Penrose |
| First Division; BG Horatio Wright | 2nd Brigade Col Emory Upton | 5th Maine: Col Clark S. Edwards; 121st New York: Ltc Egbert Olcott (w); 95th Pennsylvania: Ltc Edward Carroll (k); 96th Pennsylvania: Ltc William H. Lessig |
| First Division; BG Horatio Wright | 3rd Brigade BG David A. Russell | 6th Maine: Maj George Fuller; 49th Pennsylvania: Col Thomas M. Hulings; 119th Pennsylvania: Maj Henry P. Truefitt, Jr.; 5th Wisconsin: Ltc Theodore B. Catlin |
| First Division; BG Horatio Wright | 4th Brigade BG Alexander Shaler (c); Col Nelson Cross | 65th New York: Col Joseph E. Hamblin; 67th New York: Col Nelson Cross; 122nd New York: Ltc Augustus W. Dwight; 82nd Pennsylvania (detachment) |
| Second Division; BG George W. Getty (w); BG Frank Wheaton; BG Thomas H. Neill | 1st Brigade BG Frank Wheaton | 62nd New York: Col David J. Nevin; 93rd Pennsylvania: Ltc John S. Long, Maj John I. Nevin (w); 98th Pennsylvania: Col John F. Ballier; 102nd Pennsylvania: Col John W. Patterson (k); 139th Pennsylvania: Ltc William H. Moody, Maj Abraham H. Snyder (k) |
| Second Division; BG George W. Getty (w); BG Frank Wheaton; BG Thomas H. Neill | 2nd Brigade Col Lewis A. Grant | 2nd Vermont: Col Newton Stone (k), Ltc John S. Tyler (mw); 3rd Vermont: Col Thomas O. Seaver; 4th Vermont: Col George P. Foster (w); 5th Vermont: Ltc John R. Lewis (w); 6th Vermont: Col Elisha L. Barney (mw) |
| Second Division; BG George W. Getty (w); BG Frank Wheaton; BG Thomas H. Neill | 3rd Brigade BG Thomas H. Neill; Col Daniel D. Bidwell | 7th Maine: Col Edwin C. Mason; 43rd New York: Ltc John Wilson (k), Maj John Fryer (k); 49th New York: Col Daniel D. Bidwell; 77th New York: Maj Nathan S. Babcock; 61st Pennsylvania: Col George F. Smith |
| Second Division; BG George W. Getty (w); BG Frank Wheaton; BG Thomas H. Neill | 4th Brigade BG Henry L. Eustis | 7th Massachusetts: Col Thomas D. Johns; 10th Massachusetts: Ltc Joseph B. Parsons; 37th Massachusetts: Col Oliver Edwards; 2nd Rhode Island: Ltc Samuel B. M. Read |
| Third Division; BG James B. Ricketts | 1st Brigade BG William H. Morris | 14th New Jersey: Ltc Caldwell K. Hall; 106th New York: Ltc Charles Townsend; 151st New York: Ltc Thomas M. Fay; 87th Pennsylvania: Col John W. Schall; 10th Vermont: Ltc William W. Henry |
| Third Division; BG James B. Ricketts | 2nd Brigade BG Truman Seymour (c); Col Benjamin F. Smith | 6th Maryland: Col John W. Horn; 110th Ohio: Col J. Warren Keifer (w), Maj William S. McElwain (k); 122nd Ohio: Col William H. Ball; 126th Ohio: Col Benjamin F. Smith; 67th Pennsylvania (detachment): Cpt George W. Guss; 138th Pennsylvania: Col Matthew R. McClennan |
| | Artillery Brigade Col Charles H. Tompkins | Maine Light, 4th Battery: Lt Melville C. Kimball; Massachusetts Light, 1st Battery (A): Cpt William H. McCartney; New York Light, 1st Battery: Cpt Andrew Cowan; New York Light, 3rd Battery: Cpt William A. Harn; 4th New York Heavy, 1st Battalion: Maj Thomas D. Sears; 1st Rhode Island Light, Battery C: Cpt Richard Waterman; 1st Rhode Island Light, Battery E: Cpt William B. Rhodes; 1st Rhode Island Light, Battery G: Cpt George W. Adams; 5th United States, Battery M: Cpt James McKnight |

==== Cavalry Corps ====
MG Philip H. Sheridan

Escort:

- 6th United States: Cpt Ira W. Claflin (Headquarter)
- 8th Illinois (detachment): Lt William W. Long (Third Division)

| Division | Brigade | Regiments and Others |
|---|---|---|
| First Division; BG Alfred T. A. Torbert; BG Wesley Merritt | 1st Brigade BG George A. Custer | 1st Michigan: Ltc Peter Stagg; 5th Michigan: Col Russell A. Alger; 6th Michigan: Maj James H. Kidd; 7th Michigan: Maj Henry W. Granger |
| First Division; BG Alfred T. A. Torbert; BG Wesley Merritt | 2nd Brigade Col Thomas Devin | 4th New York: Ltc William R. Parnell; 6th New York: Ltc William H. Crocker; 9th New York: Col William Sackett; 17th Pennsylvania: Ltc James Q. Anderson (w&c) |
| First Division; BG Alfred T. A. Torbert; BG Wesley Merritt | Reserve Brigade BG Wesley Merritt; Col Alfred Gibbs | 19th New York (1st Dragoons): Col Alfred Gibbs; 6th Pennsylvania: Maj James Starr; 1st United States: Cpt Nelson B. Sweitzer; 2nd United States: Cpt Theophilus F. Rodenbough; 5th United States: Cpt Abraham K. Arnold |
| Second Division; BG David McM. Gregg | 1st Brigade BG Henry E. Davies, Jr. | 1st Massachusetts: Maj Lucius M. Sargent; 1st New Jersey: Ltc John W. Kester; 6th Ohio: Col William Stedman; 1st Pennsylvania: Col John P. Taylor |
| Second Division; BG David McM. Gregg | 2nd Brigade Col J. Irvin Gregg | 1st Maine: Col Charles H. Smith; 10th New York: Maj M. Henry Avery; 2nd Pennsylvania: Ltc Joseph P. Brinton; 4th Pennsylvania: Ltc George H. Covode; 8th Pennsylvania: Ltc Samuel Wilson; 16th Pennsylvania: Ltc John K. Robison |
| Third Division; BG James H. Wilson | 1st Brigade Col Timothy M. Bryan, Jr. Col John B. McIntosh | 1st Connecticut: Maj Erastus Blakeslee; 2nd New York: Col Otto Harhaus; 5th New York: Ltc John Hammond; 18th Pennsylvania: Ltc William P. Brinton, Col Timothy M. Bryan, Jr. |
| Third Division; BG James H. Wilson | 2nd Brigade Col George H. Chapman | 3rd Indiana: Maj William Patton; 8th New York: Ltc William H. Benjamin; 1st Vermont: Ltc Addison W. Preston |
| | 1st Brigade Horse Artillery Cpt James M. Robertson | New York Light, 6th Battery: Cpt Joseph W. Martin; 2nd United States, Batteries B and L: Lt Edward Heaton; 2nd United States, Battery D: Lt Edward B. Williston; 2nd United States, Battery M: Lt Alexander C. M. Pennington, Jr.; 4th United States, Battery A: Lt Rufus King, Jr.; 4th United States, Batteries C and E: Lt Charles L. Fitzhugh |

==== Artillery ====
BG Henry J. Hunt

| Division | Brigade | Regiments and Others |
|---|---|---|
| Artillery Reserve; Col Henry S. Burton | 1st Brigade Col J. Howard Kitching | 6th New York Heavy: Ltc Edmund R. Travis; 15th New York Heavy: Col Louis Schirmer |
| Artillery Reserve; Col Henry S. Burton | 2nd Brigade Maj John Almy Tompkins | Maine Light, 5th Battery (E): Cpt Greenlief T. Stevens; 1st New Jersey Light, Battery A: Cpt William Hexamer; 1st New Jersey Light, Battery B: Cpt A. Judson Clark; New York Light, 5th Battery: Cpt Elijah D. Taft; New York Light, 12th Battery: Cpt George F. McKnight; 1st New York Light, Battery B: Cpt Albert S. Sheldon |
| Artillery Reserve; Col Henry S. Burton | 3rd Brigade Maj Robert H. Fitzhugh | Massachusetts Light, 9th Battery: Cpt John Bigelow; New York Light, 15th Battery: Cpt Patrick Hart; 1st New York Light, Battery C: Lt William H. Phillips; New York Light, 11th Battery: Cpt John E. Burton; 1st Ohio Light, Battery H: Lt William A. Ewing; 5th United States, Battery E: Lt John R. Brincklé |
| Artillery Reserve; Col Henry S. Burton | 2nd Brigade Horse Artillery Cpt Dunbar R. Ransom | 1st United States, Batteries E and G: Lt Frank S. French; 1st United States, Batteries H and I: Cpt Alanson M. Randol; 1st United States, Battery K: Lt John Egan; 2nd United States, Battery A: Lt Robert Clarke; 2nd United States, Battery G: Lt William N. Dennison; 3rd United States, Batteries C, F, and K: Lt James R. Kelly |

== See also ==
- Spotsylvania Court House Union order of battle
- Cold Harbor Union order of battle
