= Second Battle of Petersburg order of battle: Union =

The following Union Army units and commanders fought in the Second Battle of Petersburg (June 15–18, 1864) of the American Civil War. Order of battle compiled from the casualty returns. The Confederate order of battle is listed separately.

== Abbreviations used ==
=== Military Rank ===
- LTG = Lieutenant General
- MG = Major General
- BG = Brigadier General
- Col = Colonel
- Ltc = Lieutenant Colonel
- Maj = Major
- Cpt = Captain

=== Other ===
- w = wounded
- k = killed

== General in Chief ==
LTG Ulysses S. Grant, commanding general, U.S. armies

=== Army of the James ===
MG Benjamin F. Butler

==== Headquarters units ====
Naval Brigade
BG Charles K. Graham

Siege Artillery
Col Henry L. Abbot

- 1st Connecticut Heavy Artillery
- 13th New York Heavy Artillery, Companies A and H
- 3rd Pennsylvania Heavy Artillery, Company M

==== X Corps ====
BG Alfred H. Terry

| Division | Brigade | Regiments and Others |
|---|---|---|
| 2nd Division; BG Adelbert Ames | 1st Brigade Col Newton Martin Curtis | 3rd New York; 112th New York; 117th New York; 142nd New York |
| 2nd Division; BG Adelbert Ames | 2nd Brigade Col William B. Barton | 47th New York; 48th New York; 115th New York; 76th Pennsylvania |
| 2nd Division; BG Adelbert Ames | 3rd Brigade Col Louis Bell | 13th Indiana; 9th Maine; 4th New Hampshire; 169th New York; 97th Pennsylvania |
| 2nd Division; BG Adelbert Ames | Artillery Brigade | 5th Battery, New Jersey Artillery; Battery D, 1st U.S. Artillery; Battery E, 3rd U.S. Artillery; Battery D, 4th U.S. Artillery |

==== XVIII Corps ====
MG William F. Smith

| Division | Brigade | Regiments and Others |
|---|---|---|
| First Division; BG William T. H. Brooks until June 18; BG Gilman Marston | 1st Brigade BG Gilman Marston; Col Edgar M. Cullen | 81st New York; 96th New York; 98th New York; 139th New York |
| First Division; BG William T. H. Brooks until June 18; BG Gilman Marston | 2nd Brigade BG Hiram Burnham | 8th Connecticut; 10th New Hampshire; 13th New Hampshire; 118th New York |
| First Division; BG William T. H. Brooks until June 18; BG Gilman Marston | 3rd Brigade Col Guy V. Henry | 21st Connecticut; 40th Massachusetts; 92nd New York; 58th Pennsylvania; 188th Pennsylvania |
| First Division; BG William T. H. Brooks until June 18; BG Gilman Marston | Artillery Brigade Cpt Samuel S. Elder | Battery B, 1st U.S. Artillery; Battery L, 4th U.S. Artillery; Battery A, 5th U.S. Artillery |
| Second Division; BG John H. Martindale | 1st Brigade BG George J. Stannard | 23rd Massachusetts; 25th Massachusetts; 27th Massachusetts; 9th New Jersey; 10th New York Heavy Artillery; 55th Pennsylvania |
| Second Division; BG John H. Martindale | 2nd Brigade Col Griffin A. Stedman, Jr. | 11th Connecticut; 8th Maine; 12th New Hampshire; 148th New York; 19th Wisconsin |
| Second Division; BG John H. Martindale | 3rd Brigade Col Augustus A. Gibson | 5th Maryland; 2nd Pennsylvania Heavy Artillery |
| Second Division; BG John H. Martindale | Artillery | Battery F, 1st Rhode Island Light |
| Third Division; BG Edward W. Hincks | 1st Brigade BG Edward A. Wild | 5th Massachusetts Colored Cavalry; 1st U.S.C.T. Cavalry (dismounted); 1st U.S.C.T.; 10th U.S.C.T. |
| Third Division; BG Edward W. Hincks | 2nd Brigade Col Samuel A. Duncan | 2nd U.S.C.T. Cavalry (dismounted); 4th U.S.C.T.; 5th U.S.C.T.; 6th U.S.C.T.; 22nd U.S.C.T. |
| Third Division; BG Edward W. Hincks | 3rd Brigade Col John Henry Holman | 1st U.S.C.T.; 5th Massachusetts Cavalry |

==== Cavalry ====
| Division | Brigade | Regiments and Others |
|---|---|---|
| Cavalry Division; BG August V. Kautz | 1st Brigade Col Simon H. Mix (k) June 15; Col Robert M. West | 3rd New York Cavalry; 5th Pennsylvania Cavalry |
| Cavalry Division; BG August V. Kautz | 2nd Brigade Col Samuel P. Spear | 1st District of Columbia Cavalry; 11th Pennsylvania Cavalry |
| Cavalry Division; BG August V. Kautz | Unassigned | Companies F & G, 4th Massachusetts Cavalry; 1st New York Mounted Rifles |
| Cavalry Division; BG August V. Kautz | Artillery Brigade | 1st Section, 4th Wisconsin Battery; 2nd Section, 4th Wisconsin Battery |

=== Army of the Potomac ===
MG George Meade

==== Headquarters units ====
Provost Guard
BG Marsena R. Patrick

- 1st Massachusetts Cavalry, Companies C & D
- 80th New York
- 3rd Pennsylvania Cavalry
- 68th Pennsylvania
- 114th Pennsylvania

Artillery
BG Henry J. Hunt

Volunteer Engineer Brigade
BG Henry W. Benham

- 15th New York Engineers
- 50th New York Engineers
- Battalion U.S. Engineers

==== II Corps ====
MG Winfield S. Hancock relinquished command June 18
MG David B. Birney

- 1st Vermont Cavalry, Company M

| Division | Brigade | Regiments and Others |
|---|---|---|
| First Division; BG Francis C. Barlow | 1st Brigade Col Nelson A. Miles | 28th Massachusetts; 26th Michigan; 5th New Hampshire; 2nd New York Heavy Artillery: Col Joseph Whistler; 61st New York; 81st Pennsylvania; 140th Pennsylvania; 183rd Pennsylvania |
| First Division; BG Francis C. Barlow | 2nd Brigade (Irish Brigade) Col Patrick Kelly (k) June 16; Cpt Richard Moroney | 63rd New York; 69th New York; 88th New York; 116th Pennsylvania |
| First Division; BG Francis C. Barlow | 3rd Brigade Col Clinton D. MacDougall | 39th New York; 52nd New York; 57th New York; 111th New York; 125th New York; 126th New York |
| First Division; BG Francis C. Barlow | 4th Brigade Col James A. Beaver (w) June 16; Ltc John Hastings | 2nd Delaware; 7th New York Heavy Artillery; 64th New York; 66th New York; 53rd Pennsylvania; 145th Pennsylvania; 148th Pennsylvania |
| Second Division; BG John Gibbon | 1st Brigade BG Byron R. Pierce (w) June 18 | 19th Maine; 1st Company Sharpshooters; 15th Massachusetts; 19th Massachusetts; 20th Massachusetts; 1st Company Massachusetts Sharpshooters; 7th Michigan; 1st Minnesota Battalion; 42nd New York; 59th New York; 82nd New York; 184th Pennsylvania; 36th Wisconsin: Col John A. Savage (k); Maj Clement Warner |
| Second Division; BG John Gibbon | 2nd Brigade (Philadelphia Brigade) Col John Fraser | 152nd New York; 69th Pennsylvania; 72nd Pennsylvania; 106th Pennsylvania |
| Second Division; BG John Gibbon | 3rd Brigade Col Thomas A. Smyth | 14th Connecticut; 1st Delaware; 12th New Jersey; 10th New York Battalion; 108th New York; 4th Ohio; 8th Ohio; 7th West Virginia |
| Second Division; BG John Gibbon | 4th Brigade Col John Ramsey (w) June 16; Col James Patrick McIvor | 8th New York Heavy Artillery; 155th New York; 164th New York; 170th New York; 182nd New York |
| Third Division; MG David B. Birney; BG Gershom Mott | 1st Brigade Col Thomas W. Egan (w) June 16; Col Henry J. Madill | 20th Indiana; 17th Maine; 40th New York; 86th New York; 124th New York; 99th Pennsylvania; 110th Pennsylvania; 141st Pennsylvania; 2nd United States Sharpshooters |
| Third Division; MG David B. Birney; BG Gershom Mott | 2nd Brigade Col Thomas R. Tannatt June 16; Maj Levi P. Duff June 16; Maj John Willian June 16; Col Robert McAllister | 1st Massachusetts Heavy Artillery; 5th Michigan; 93rd New York; 57th Pennsylvania; 63rd Pennsylvania; 105th Pennsylvania; 1st United States Sharpshooters |
| Third Division; MG David B. Birney; BG Gershom Mott | 3rd Brigade BG Gershom Mott June 18; Col Daniel Chaplin | 1st Maine Heavy Artillery; 16th Massachusetts; 5th New Jersey; 6th New Jersey; 7th New Jersey; 8th New Jersey; 11th New Jersey; 115th Pennsylvania |
| Third Division; MG David B. Birney; BG Gershom Mott | 4th Brigade Col William R. Brewster | 11th Massachusetts; 71st New York; 72nd New York; 73rd New York; 74th New York; 120th New York; 84th Pennsylvania |
| Artillery Brigade Col John C. Tidball | 6th Battery, Maine Light; 10th Battery, Massachusetts Light; 1st Battery, New Hampshire Light; Battery B, 1st New Jersey Light; Battery G, 1st New York Light; 3rd Battalion, 4th New York Heavy; 11th Battery, New York Light; 12th Battery, New York Light; Battery F, 1st Pennsylvania Light; Battery A, 1st Rhode Island Light; Battery B, 1st Rhode Island Light; Battery K, 4th U.S. Artillery; Battery C & I, 5th United States | |

==== V Corps ====
MG Gouverneur K. Warren

- 12th New York Battalion

| Division | Brigade | Regiments and Others |
|---|---|---|
| First Division; BG Charles Griffin | 1st Brigade Col Joshua L. Chamberlain (w) June 18; Col William S. Tilton | 121st Pennsylvania; 142nd Pennsylvania; 143rd Pennsylvania; 149th Pennsylvania; 150th Pennsylvania; 187th Pennsylvania |
| First Division; BG Charles Griffin | 2nd Brigade Col Jacob B. Sweitzer | 22nd Massachusetts; 32nd Massachusetts: Col George L. Prescott (mw); 4th Michigan; 62nd Pennsylvania; 91st Pennsylvania; 155th Pennsylvania; 21st Pennsylvania Cavalry |
| First Division; BG Charles Griffin | 3rd Brigade BG Joseph J. Bartlett | 20th Maine; 18th Massachusetts; 1st Michigan; 16th Michigan; 44th New York; 83rd Pennsylvania; 118th Pennsylvania |
| Second Division; BG Romeyn B. Ayres | 1st Brigade Col Edgar M. Gregory | 5th New York; 140th New York; 146th New York; 4th U.S. Infantry; Detachment, 10th U.S. Infantry; Detachment, 11th U.S. Infantry; 12th U.S. Infantry; 14th U.S. Infantry; 17th U.S. Infantry |
| Second Division; BG Romeyn B. Ayres | 2nd Brigade Col Nathan T. Dushane | 1st Maryland; 4th Maryland; 7th Maryland; 8th Maryland; Purnell (Maryland) Legion |
| Second Division; BG Romeyn B. Ayres | 3rd Brigade Col J. Howard Kitching | 6th New York Heavy Artillery; Battery M, 15th New York Heavy Artillery: Cpt William D. Dickey (w) |
| Third Division; BG Samuel W. Crawford | 1st Brigade Col Peter Lyle | 16th Maine; 13th Massachusetts; 39th Massachusetts; 104th New York; 90th Pennsylvania; 107th Pennsylvania |
| Third Division; BG Samuel W. Crawford | 2nd Brigade Col James L. Bates | 12th Massachusetts; 94th New York; 97th New York; 11th Pennsylvania; 88th Pennsylvania |
| Third Division; BG Samuel W. Crawford | 3rd Brigade Col James Carle | 190th Pennsylvania; 191st Pennsylvania |
| Fourth Division; BG Lysander Cutler | 1st Brigade (Iron Brigade) BG Edward S. Bragg | 7th Indiana; 19th Indiana; 24th Michigan: Ltc Albert M. Edwards (in command June 18th), Cpt George W. Burchell (in command June 17th, (w) June 18th); 1st Battalion, New York Sharpshooters; 6th Wisconsin: Ltc Rufus Dawes; 7th Wisconsin: Ltc Mark Finnicum |
| Fourth Division; BG Lysander Cutler | 2nd Brigade Col William Hofmann | 3rd Delaware; 4th Delaware; 76th New York; 95th New York; 147th New York; 56th Pennsylvania; 157th Pennsylvania |
| Fourth Division; BG Lysander Cutler | Artillery Brigade Col Charles S. Wainwright | 3rd Massachusetts Light; 5th Battery, Massachusetts Light; 9th Battery, Massachusetts Light; Battery B, 1st New York Light; Battery C, 1st New York Light; Battery D, 1st New York Light; Battery E & Battery L, 1st New York Light; Battery H, 1st New York Light; 5th Battery, New York Light; 15th Battery, New York Light; Battery B, 1st Pennsylvania Light; Battery B, 4th U.S. Artillery; Battery D, 5th U.S. Artillery |

==== VI Corps ====
MG Horatio G. Wright

- 8th Pennsylvania Cavalry, Company A

| Division | Brigade | Regiments and Others |
|---|---|---|
| First Division; BG David A. Russell | 1st Brigade Col William H. Penrose | 1st Delaware Dismounted Cavalry; 4th New Jersey; 10th New Jersey; 15th New Jersey |
| First Division; BG David A. Russell | 2nd Brigade BG Emory Upton | 2nd Connecticut Heavy Artillery; 5th Maine; 121st New York; 95th Pennsylvania; 96th Pennsylvania |
| First Division; BG David A. Russell | 3rd Brigade Col Gideon Clark | 6th Maine; 49th Pennsylvania; 119th Pennsylvania; 5th Wisconsin |
| First Division; BG David A. Russell | 4th Brigade Col Nelson Cross | 65th New York; 67th New York; 122nd New York; 23rd Pennsylvania; 82nd Pennsylvania |
| Second Division; BG Thomas H. Neill (attached to 2nd Division, XVIII Corps on June 18) | 1st Brigade BG Frank Wheaton | 62nd New York; 93rd Pennsylvania; 98th Pennsylvania; 102nd Pennsylvania; 139th Pennsylvania |
| Second Division; BG Thomas H. Neill (attached to 2nd Division, XVIII Corps on June 18) | 2nd Brigade (1st Vermont Brigade) BG Lewis A. Grant | 2nd Vermont; 3rd Vermont; 4th Vermont; 5th Vermont; 6th Vermont; 11th Vermont Heavy Artillery |
| Second Division; BG Thomas H. Neill (attached to 2nd Division, XVIII Corps on June 18) | 3rd Brigade Col Daniel D. Bidwell | 7th Maine; 43rd New York; 49th New York; 77th New York; 61st Pennsylvania |
| Second Division; BG Thomas H. Neill (attached to 2nd Division, XVIII Corps on June 18) | 4th Brigade Col Oliver Edwards | 7th Massachusetts; 10th Massachusetts; 37th Massachusetts; 2nd Rhode Island |
| Third Division; BG James B. Ricketts | 1st Brigade Col William S. Truex | 14th New Jersey; 106th New York; 151st New York; 87th Pennsylvania; 10th Vermont |
| Third Division; BG James B. Ricketts | 2nd Brigade Col Benjamin F. Smith | 6th Maryland; 9th New York Heavy Artillery; 110th Ohio; 122nd Ohio; 126th Ohio; 67th Pennsylvania; 138th Pennsylvania |
| Artillery Brigade Col Charles H. Tompkins | 4th Battery, Maine Light; 5th Battery, Maine Light; 1st Battery, Massachusetts Light; Battery A, 1st New Jersey Light; 1st Battery, New York Light; 3rd Battery, New York Light; 1st Battalion, 4th New York Heavy; Battery H, 1st Ohio Light; Battery C, 1st Rhode Island Light; Battery E, 1st Rhode Island Light; Battery G, 1st Rhode Island Light; Battery E, 5th U.S. Artillery; Battery M, 5th U.S. Artillery | |

==== IX Corps ====
MG Ambrose E. Burnside

- 8th United States

| Division | Brigade | Regiments and Others |
|---|---|---|
| First Division; BG James Ledlie | 1st Brigade Col Jacob P. Gould | 56th Massachusetts; 57th Massachusetts; 59th Massachusetts |
| First Division; BG James Ledlie | 2nd Brigade Col Ebenezer Peirce until 17 June; Ltc Joseph H. Barnes | 3rd Maryland; 21st Massachusetts; 29th Massachusetts; 179th New York; 100th Pennsylvania |
| First Division; BG James Ledlie | 3rd Brigade Col Elisha G. Marshall (w) June 17; Col Benjamin G. Barney | 14th New York Heavy Artillery; 2nd Pennsylvania Provisional Heavy Artillery |
| First Division; BG James Ledlie | Artillery Cpt John B. Eaton | 2nd Maine Light Battery; 14th Massachusetts Battery; 27th Battery, New York Artillery |
| Second Division; BG Robert B. Potter | 1st Brigade Col John I. Curtin (w) June 18; Ltc Henry Pleasants | 36th Massachusetts; 58th Massachusetts; 2nd New York Mounted Rifles; 45th Pennsylvania; 48th Pennsylvania; 7th Rhode Island |
| Second Division; BG Robert B. Potter | 2nd Brigade Col Simon Goodell Griffin | 2nd Maryland; 31st Maine; 32nd Maine; 6th New Hampshire; 9th New Hampshire; 11th New Hampshire; 17th Vermont |
| Second Division; BG Robert B. Potter | Artillery | 11th Massachusetts Battery; 19th New York Battery |
| Third Division; BG Orlando B. Willcox | 1st Brigade Col John F. Hartranft | 8th Michigan; 27th Michigan; 109th New York; 13th Ohio Cavalry (dismounted); 51st Pennsylvania; 37th Wisconsin; 38th Wisconsin |
| Third Division; BG Orlando B. Willcox | 2nd Brigade Col Benjamin C. Christ (w) June 17; Col William Raultson (w) June 18; Ltc George Travers (w) June 18; Col Walter C. Newberry | 1st Michigan Sharpshooters: Maj Levant C. Rhines (k), 1Lt Edward J. Buckbee (c), 1Lt Ira L. Evans; 2nd Michigan: Col William Humphrey; 20th Michigan: Maj George C. Barnes (mw), Cpt Claudius Grant; 24th New York Dismounted Cavalry; 60th Ohio; 50th Pennsylvania |
| Third Division; BG Orlando B. Willcox | Artillery | 7th Maine Battery; 34th New York Battery |
| Fourth Division; BG Edward Ferrero | 1st Brigade Col Joshua K. Sigfried | 27th U.S. Colored Troops; 30th U.S. Colored Troops; 39th U.S. Colored Troops; 43rd U.S. Colored Troops |
| Fourth Division; BG Edward Ferrero | 2nd Brigade Col Henry Goddard Thomas | 19th U.S. Colored Troops; 23rd U.S. Colored Troops; 31st U.S. Colored Troops |
| Fourth Division; BG Edward Ferrero | Artillery | Battery D, Pennsylvania Independent Light; 3rd Vermont Battery |

==== Cavalry Corps ====
MG Philip H. Sheridan

| Division | Brigade | Regiments and Others |
|---|---|---|
| First Division; BG Alfred T. A. Torbert | 1st Brigade (Wolverine Brigade) BG George A. Custer | 1st Michigan; 5th Michigan; 6th Michigan; 7th Michigan |
| First Division; BG Alfred T. A. Torbert | 2nd Brigade Col Thomas C. Devin | 4th New York; 6th New York; 9th New York; 17th Pennsylvania |
| First Division; BG Alfred T. A. Torbert | Reserve Brigade BG Wesley Merritt | 19th New York (1st Dragoon); 6th Pennsylvania; 1st United States; 2nd United States; 5th United States |
| Second Division; BG David McMurtrie Gregg | 1st Brigade BG Henry E. Davies, Jr. | 1st Massachusetts; 1st New Jersey; 10th New York; 6th Ohio; 1st Pennsylvania |
| Second Division; BG David McMurtrie Gregg | 2nd Brigade Col John Irvin Gregg | 1st Maine; 2nd Pennsylvania; 4th Pennsylvania; 8th Pennsylvania; 13th Pennsylvania; 16th Pennsylvania |
| Third Division; BG James H. Wilson | 1st Brigade Col John Baillie McIntosh | 1st Connecticut; 3rd New Jersey; 2nd New York; 5th New York; 2nd Ohio; 18th Pennsylvania |
| Third Division; BG James H. Wilson | 2nd Brigade Col George H. Chapman | 3rd Indiana; 8th New York; 1st Vermont |
| Horse Artillery | 1st Brigade Cpt James M. Robertson | 6th New York Battery; Battery B & L, 2nd U.S. Artillery; Battery D, 2nd U.S. Artillery; Battery M, 2nd U.S. Artillery; Battery C & E, 4th U.S. Artillery |
| Horse Artillery | 2nd Brigade Cpt Dunbar R. Ransom | Battery E & G, 1st U.S. Artillery; Battery H & I, 1st U.S. Artillery; Battery K, 1st U.S. Artillery; Battery A, 2nd U.S. Artillery |
