= John Willian =

John Willian, Jr. (1835 – April 25, 1869) was a Union Army colonel and assistant adjutant general during the American Civil War. He was mustered out of the volunteers on July 15, 1865. In 1866, he was nominated and confirmed for appointment as a brevet brigadier general, to rank from April 9, 1865.

Born in Lancashire, he was one of the few higher-ranked Civil War officers to be born in England. He served as a second lieutenant with the 4th New Jersey Militia during the time of the First Battle of Bull Run. He served as acting assistant inspector general for Brigadier General Gershom Mott and later for Major General Andrew A. Humphreys.

On January 13, 1866, President Andrew Johnson nominated Willian for appointment to the grade of brevet brigadier general of volunteers, to rank from April 9, 1865, and the United States Senate confirmed the appointment on March 12, 1866.

== See also ==
- List of American Civil War generals (Union)
