= Union Mills, Virginia =

Unincorporated community in Virginia, United States

Coordinates: 37°56′22″N 78°18′02″W

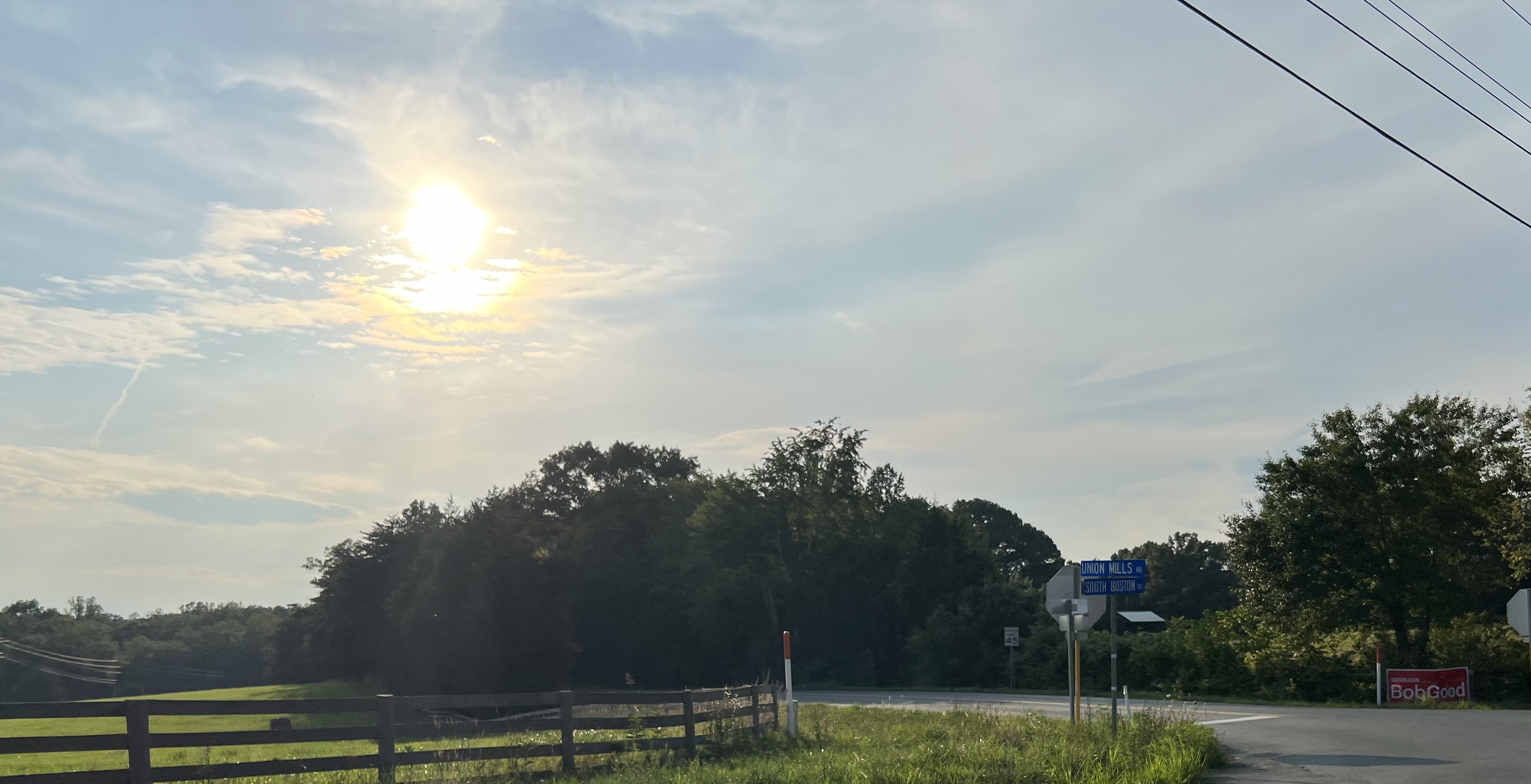
Union Mills, Virginia

Union Mills is an unincorporated community in Fluvanna County, in the U.S. state of Virginia.

In the mid-19th century, it was a point along the stagecoach route between Richmond and Staunton.
