= 11th Massachusetts Battery =

- Active: August 25, 1862 – May 29, 1863; January 2, 1864 – June 16, 1865
- Country: United States
- Branch: Union Army
- Type: Field artillery
- Size: Battery
- Part of: Second term: Artillery Brigade, IX Corps
- Engagements: American Civil War

Commanders
- Current commander: Captain Edward J. Jones

The 11th Massachusetts Battery (or 11th Battery Massachusetts Light Artillery) was an artillery battery that served in the Union Army during the American Civil War. It was formed in response to President Abraham Lincoln's August 1862 call for 300,000 men to serve for nine months. Several months after completing their first term of service, the battery was reorganized for a second term of three years (though the war ended before they could complete this term). It was recruited by Captain Edward J. Jones of Boston and consisted almost entirely of men from that city. The battery served a largely uneventful first term as garrison troops mostly in Centreville, Virginia. During their second term they were involved in heavy combat being part of the Army of the Potomac during Lieutenant General Ulysses S. Grant's Overland Campaign.

== First term of service ==
The 11th Massachusetts Battery trained for their nine-month term of service at Camp Meigs in Readville, Massachusetts in August 1862. The unit was mustered into federal service on August 25. It was the only Massachusetts unit of artillery mustered in under the nine-months call, the other 18 Massachusetts nine-months units being infantry regiments. The men were recruited in Boston and mostly came from that city and the immediate vicinity. The unit left Boston by train on October 3, 1862 and reported to Washington, D.C., on October 6. For their first two months of service, they served garrison duty as part of the defenses of Washington at Camp Barry and later at Hall's Hill in Arlington, Virginia. On November 28 they were transferred to the brigade commanded by Francis Randall garrisoned in Centreville, Virginia. During the winter and early spring of 1864, the unit was frequently used as cavalry, conducting picket and reconnaissance duty between Centreville and Union Mills, Virginia. In April the battery was transferred to the brigade commanded by Daniel Sickles and conducted garrison duty at Fort Ramsay in Arlington County, Virginia and Fort Buffalo, Virginia, both part of the defenses of Washington. At the close of their term of service, the unit departed Washington on May 23, 1863 and arrived in Boston on May 28. They were mustered out on May 29. The unit did not have any men killed in action or by disease during its first term.

== Second term of service ==
The battery was reorganized during December 1863 to serve a new term of three years. Reenlisted members of the 11th Massachusetts Battery formed the core of the new iteration. They were joined by new recruits to fill out the ranks. Capt. Edward Jones again served as commanding officer. The members of the battery were mustered in on January 2, 1864, trained at Camp Meigs, and departed Massachusetts on February 5. Reaching Washington, the battery was attached to the Second Division (commanded by Major General Robert B. Potter) of the IX Corps, assigned to the Army of the Potomac. The battery took part in the major battles of the Overland Campaign, though they were not heavily engaged until moved to the front lines on June 19 during the start of the Siege of Petersburg. On August 21 and 22, the battery took part in the Battle of Weldon Railroad while temporarily attached to the II Corps. The battery was in action at various points on the siege line at Petersburg during the fall and winter. On March 25, 1865, the battery played an important role during the Battle of Fort Stedman. As Confederate troops overtook Fort Stedman and temporarily broke through Union siege lines, the 11th Massachusetts Battery, posted in nearby Fort Friend, rendered key service in pushing back the assault. When the Confederates abandoned Petersburg and retreated towards Appomattox Court House, the 11th Massachusetts Battery joined other elements of the Army of the Potomac in pursuit. They were present for the surrender at Appomattox and were detailed with other artillery units to take charge of surrendered Confederate cannons.

== Mustering out ==
The 11th Massachusetts Battery took part in the Grand Review of the Armies in Washington after the close of the war. In June they were ordered home to Boston and were mustered out at Camp Meigs on June 16, 1865. The battery lost three men killed in action and twelve by disease.

== See also ==
- Massachusetts in the Civil War
- List of Massachusetts Civil War units
