= 14th Massachusetts Battery =

11th Massachusetts Battery
- Active: February 27, 1864 – June 24, 1865
- Country: United States
- Branch: Union Army
- Type: Field artillery
- Size: Battery
- Part of: Artillery Brigade, 1st Division, IX Corps
- Engagements: American Civil War

Commanders
- 1st: Captain Joseph W. B. Wright
- 2nd: 1st Lt. Emphraim B. Nye

The 14th Massachusetts Battery (or 14th Battery Massachusetts Light Artillery) was an artillery battery that served in the Union Army during the American Civil War. It was organized during the winter of 1863 - 1864 at Camp Meigs just outside of Boston. It was commanded by Captain Joseph W. B. Wright of Boston and consisted mostly of men from that city. The enlisted men were mustered into federal service on February 27, 1864. They departed Massachusetts on April 4, 1864, arrived at Annapolis and then moved to Camp Marshall in Washington, D.C. On April 22 and 24 they were outfitted with field guns and horses but had virtually no time to train in light artillery tactics before they were assigned to the IX Corps of the Army of the Potomac and joined Lieutenant General Ulysses S. Grant's Overland Campaign.

The battery did not participate in the opening battle of the campaign at the Wilderness but soon advanced to the front lines and fired their first shots at the enemy on May 10 during the Battle of Spotsylvania Court House. Over the next two days they were heavily engaged, nearly losing their guns on May 12 during a Confederate charge which they narrowly repulsed. On May 23 they were engaged in the Battle of North Anna. During the Battle of Totopotomoy Creek on June 1, the 14th Massachusetts Battery played an important role in repulsing a Confederate assault on their section of the lines. They were again engaged during the Battle of Cold Harbor from June 6 to June 12. It took an active part in the Siege of Petersburg being moved to the front lines and engaged with enemy artillery from June 21 to 24, July 10 to 17, August 5 to 21 and on October 11. On October 25, 1864 they moved to Fort Merriam in the defenses of City Point, Virginia and there went into winter quarters.

In March 1865, the battery returned to the IX Corps and was stationed on the siege lines in Battery X of Fort Stedman. On March 25, 1865, the Confederates attempted to break the Siege of Petersburg with a surprise night attack on Fort Stedman. The 14th Massachusetts Battery was overwhelmed and took serious casualties, including their commanding officer, Lt. Ephraim Nye who was killed in action. Later in the day, Fort Stedman, along with the guns of the 14th Massachusetts Battery, was retaken by Union troops and the 14th Massachusetts Battery re-manned their guns. From that time to the end of the Siege of Petersburg, the battery was almost constantly engaged, being located at the closest point between the two siege lines. They were very sharply engaged on April 1 and 2 during the Third Battle of Petersburg.

On April 3, 1865, the day after Confederate troops abandoned Petersburg and retreated westward, the 14th Massachusetts Battery was moved back to City Point. They remained there for a month then marched through Richmond on their way to Fairfax Seminary near Washington were they encamped for another month. On June 4 they received orders to return home. They reached Boston on June 6 and were mustered out on June 15. The battery lost ten men killed in action or mortally wounded nine by disease for a total of 19 dead.

== See also ==
- Massachusetts in the Civil War
- List of Massachusetts Civil War units
