= 34th Independent Battery New York Light Artillery =

34th Ind. Battery New York Light Artillery Battery L, 2nd New York Artillery
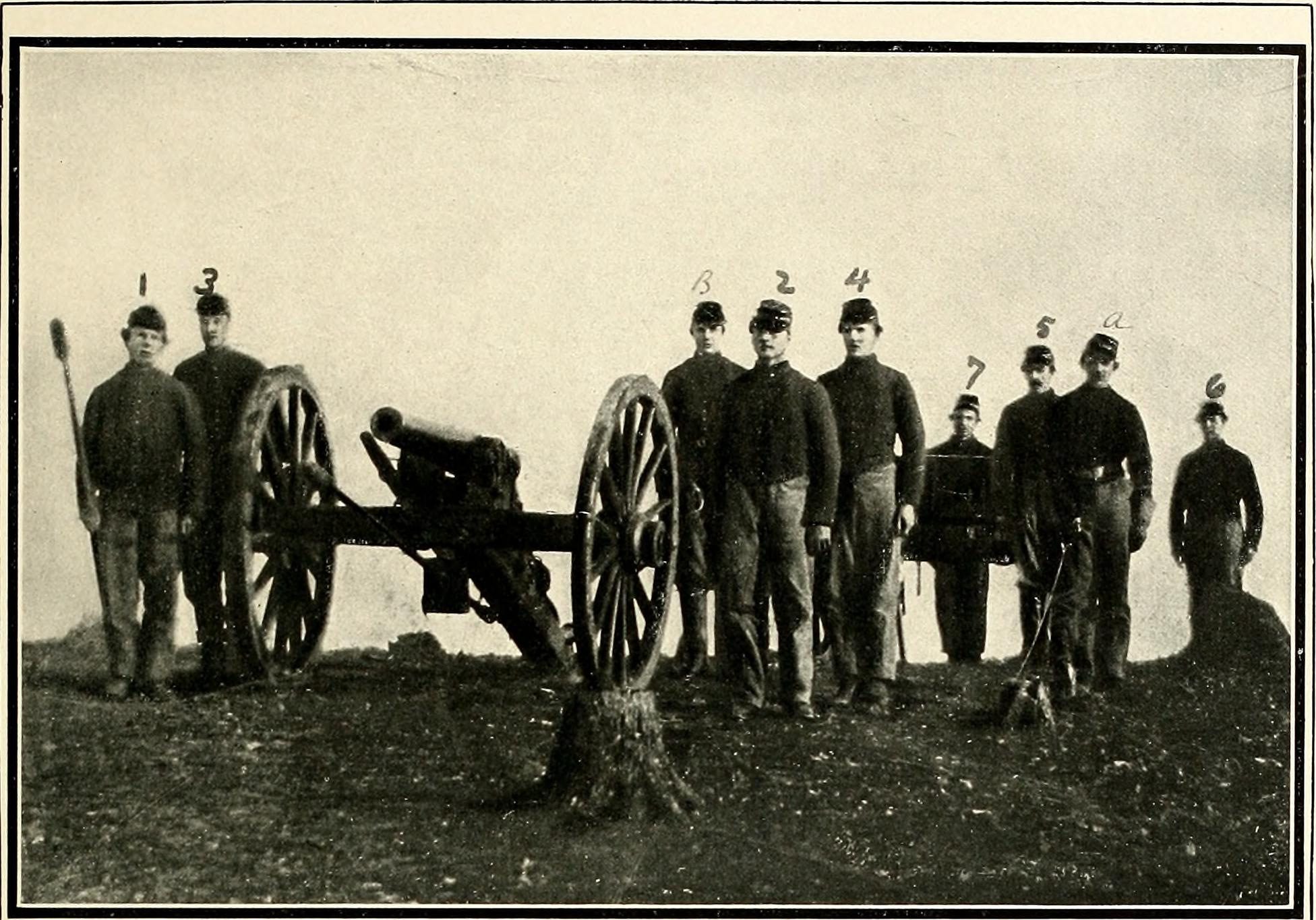
- Union gun crew poses with a 3-inch Ordnance rifle. These men belong to Cowan's 1st New York Battery and are numbered according to function.
- Active: 18 Nov. 1861 – 21 June 1865
- Country: United States
- Allegiance: (United States) Union; New York
- Branch: Union Army
- Type: Field Artillery
- Size: Artillery Battery
- Nickname: Flushing Battery
- Equipment: 6 x 3-inch Ordnance rifles
- Engagements: American Civil War; Battle of Cedar Mountain (1862); Second Battle of Bull Run (1862); Battle of Antietam (1862); Battle of Fredericksburg (1862); Siege of Vicksburg (1863); Jackson Expedition (1863); Knoxville campaign (1863); Battle of Blue Springs (1863); Battle of Campbell's Station (1863); Battle of Fort Sanders (1863); Battle of the Wilderness (1864); Battle of Spotsylvania (1864); Battle of North Anna (1864); Battle of Totopotomoy Creek (1864); Battle of Cold Harbor (1864); Siege of Petersburg (1864–65); Battle of Appomattox (1865)

Commanders
- Notable commanders: Jacob Roemer

The 34th Independent Battery New York Light Artillery was an artillery battery that served in the Union Army during the American Civil War. The unit was organized as Battery L, 2nd New York Heavy Artillery, but was soon detached as an independent light battery. The battery fought at Cedar Mountain, Second Bull Run, Antietam, and Fredericksburg in 1862. Battery L moved to the Western Theater where it served at Vicksburg, Jackson, and Knoxville in 1863. Now named the 34th Battery, it transferred back to the Eastern Theater where it fought at the Wilderness, Spotsylvania, North Anna, Totopotomoy, Cold Harbor, and Petersburg. The unit took part in the Appomattox campaign and the Grand Review of the Armies before being mustered out in June 1865.

== History ==
=== Organization ===
Originally organized as Battery "L," 2nd New York Heavy Artillery, and mustered in on November 18, 1861. Left State for Washington, D.C., December 2, 1861. Detached from Regiment March, 1862. Attached to Sturgis' Brigade, Military District of Washington, to June, 1862. Artillery, 2nd Army Corps, Pope's Army of Virginia, to August, 1862. 2nd Brigade, 3rd Division, 1st Army Corps, Army of Virginia, to September, 1862. Artillery, 1st Division, 9th Army Corps, Army of the Potomac, to October, 1862. Artillery, 2nd Division, 9th Army Corps, to December, 1862. Artillery, 3rd Division, 9th Army Corps, to February, 1863. Artillery, 2nd Division, 9th Army Corps, Army of the Potomac, to April, 1863, and Army of the Ohio to June, 1863. Artillery, 2nd Division, 9th Army Corps, Army of the Tennessee, to August, 1863. Artillery, 2nd Division, 9th Army Corps, Army of the Ohio, to September, 1863. Designated 34th Independent Battery November 19, 1863. Artillery, 1st Division, 9th Army Corps, Army of the Ohio, to April, 1864. Artillery, 3rd Division, 9th Army Corps, Army of the Potomac, to July, 1864. Artillery Brigade, 9th Army Corps, to June, 1865.

=== Service ===
Duty in the Defenses of Washington, D.C., until June, 1862. Battle of Cedar Mountain, Va., August 9. Pope's Campaign in Northern Virginia August 16-September 2. Fords of the Rappahannock August 20–23. Sulphur Springs August 23–24. Buckland's Bridge, Broad Run, August 27. Battles of Groveton August 29. Bull Run August 30. Duty in the Defenses of Washington and in Pleasant Valley, Md., until October 27. Movement to Falmouth, Va., October 27-November 19. Action at Jefferson November 11. Sulphur Springs November 13 and 15. Battle of Fredericksburg, Va., December 12–15. "Mud March" January 20–24, 1863. At Falmouth until February 19. Moved to Newport News, Va., February 19; thence to Paris, Ky., March 26-April 2. Duty at various points in Kentucky until June. Movement to Vicksburg, Miss., June 3–14. Siege of Vicksburg, Miss., June 14-July 4. Advance on Jackson, Miss., July 5–10. Siege of Jackson, Miss., July 10–17. At Milldale until August 6. Moved to Cincinnati, Ohio, August 6–14. March to Nicholasville, Ky., August 18–25, and to Crab Orchard September 9–11. March over Cumberland Mountains to Knoxville, Tenn., thence to Lenoir Station October 2–29. Action at Blue Springs October 10. Knoxville Campaign November 4-December 23. At Lenoir Station until November 14. Action at Lenoir Station November 14–15. Campbell's Station November 16. Siege of Knoxville November 17-December 4. Pursuit of Longstreet December 5–19. Operations in East Tennessee until March 20, 1864. Movement to Annapolis, Md., March 20-April 7. Campaign from the Rapidan to the James May 3-June 15. Battles of the Wilderness May 5–7; Spottsylvania May 8–12; Ny River May 10; Spottsylvania Court House May 12–21. Assault on the Salient (or "Bloody Angle") May 12. North Anna River May 23–26. Ox Ford May 23–24. On line of the Pamunkey May 26–28. Totopotomoy May 28–31. Cold Harbor June 1–12. Bethesda Church June 1–3. Before Petersburg June 16–18. Siege of Petersburg June 16, 1864, to April 2, 1865. Mine Explosion, Petersburg, July 30, 1864. Weldon Railroad August 18–21. Poplar Springs Church September 29-October 2. Boydton Plank Road, Hatcher's Run, October 27–28. Fort Stedman March 25, 1865. Assault and fall of Petersburg April 2. Pursuit of Lee April 3–9. Moved to Washington, D.C., April 21–27. Grand Review May 23. Mustered out June 21, 1865.

Battery lost during service 7 Enlisted men killed and mortally wounded and 14 Enlisted men by disease. Total 21.

== See also ==
- List of New York Civil War units
