= William Snyder Truex =

Union brigadier general in the American Civil War (1819-1889)

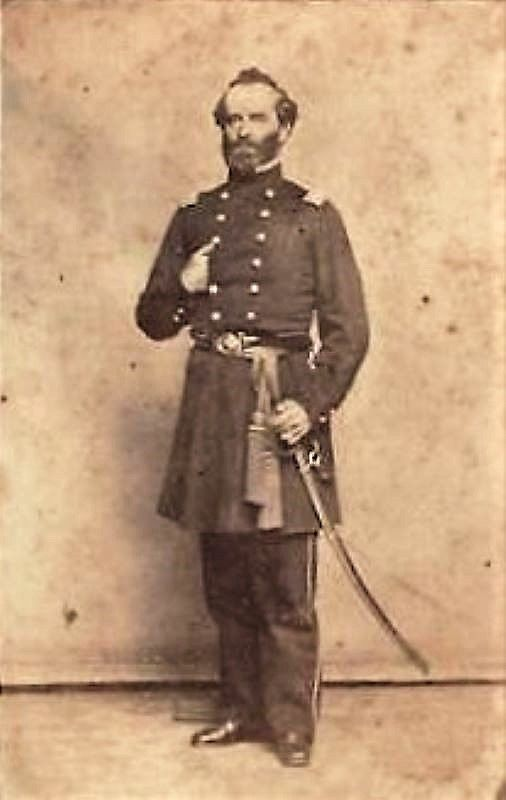
Full-length portrait of Truex, unknown date

William Snyder Truex (October 2, 1819 – September 5, 1889) was an American Union brevet brigadier general during the period of the American Civil War. He received his appointment as brevet brigadier general dated to April 2, 1865.

Truex also served in the Mexican–American War. During the American Civil War, he served as a major with the 5th New Jersey Volunteer Infantry, as a lieutenant colonel with the 10th New Jersey Volunteer Infantry, and a colonel with the 14th New Jersey Volunteer Infantry.
