= 93rd Pennsylvania Infantry Regiment =

Union Army infantry regiment

93rd Pennsylvania Volunteer Infantry
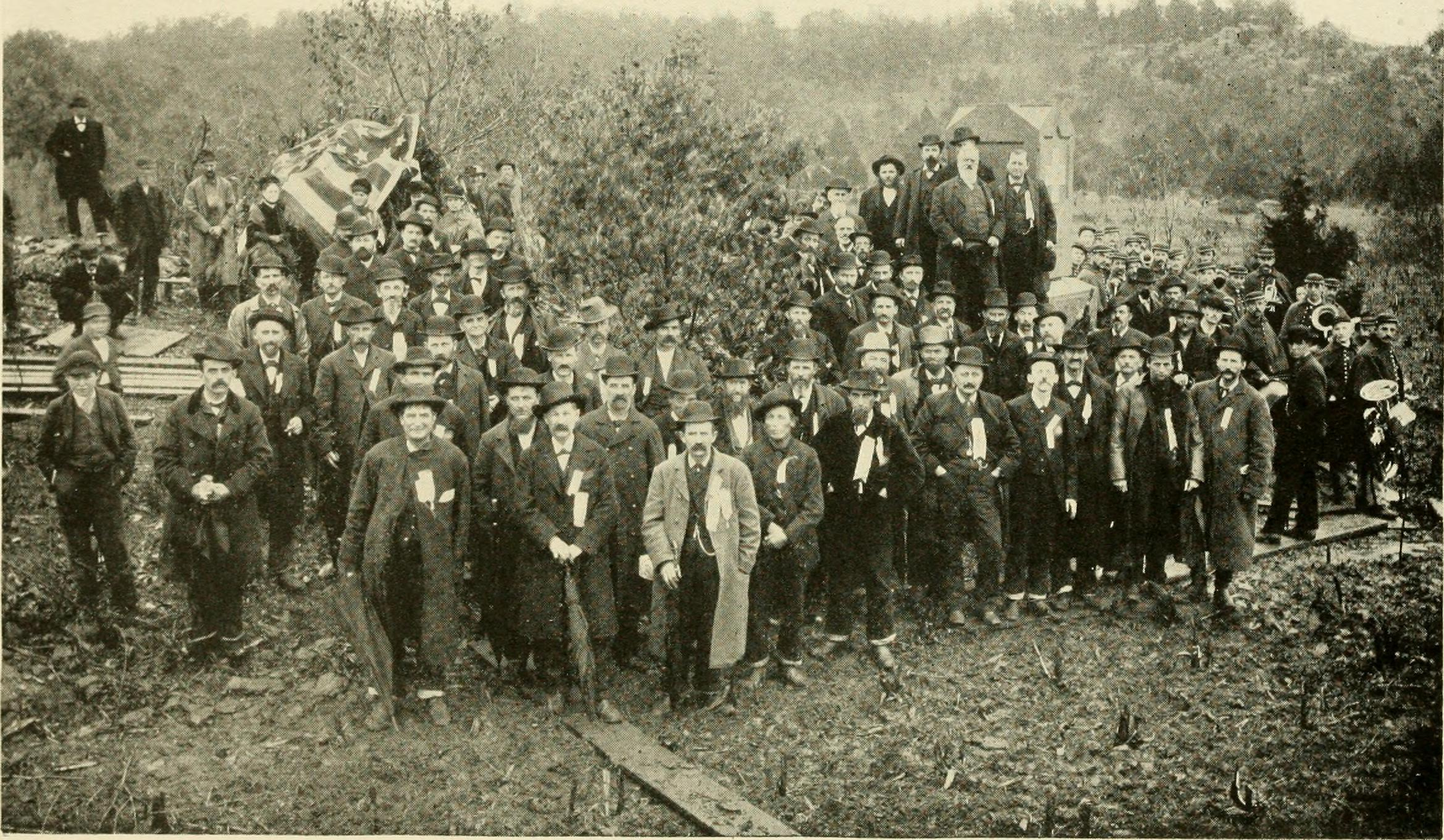
- 93rd Pennsylvania Infantry Regiment veterans at the dedication of their monument at Gettysburg, October 30, 1884.
- Active: September 21, 1861 to June 27, 1865
- Country: United States
- Allegiance: Union
- Branch: Infantry
- Size: 1,908
- Engagements: Siege of Yorktown; Battle of Williamsburg; Battle of Seven Pines; Seven Days Battles; Battle of Malvern Hill; Battle of Chantilly; Battle of Antietam; Battle of Fredericksburg; Battle of Chancellorsville; Battle of Gettysburg; Bristoe Campaign; Mine Run Campaign; Battle of the Wilderness; Battle of Spotsylvania Court House; Battle of Totopotomoy Creek; Battle of Cold Harbor; Siege of Petersburg; Battle of Jerusalem Plank Road; Battle of Fort Stevens; Third Battle of Winchester; Battle of Fisher's Hill; Battle of Cedar Creek; Battle of Fort Stedman; Battle of Hatcher's Run; Appomattox Campaign; Third Battle of Petersburg; Battle of Appomattox Court House

The 93rd Pennsylvania Volunteer Infantry was an infantry regiment that served in the Union Army during the American Civil War.

== Service ==
The 93rd Pennsylvania Infantry was organized at Lebanon, Pennsylvania from September 21 through October 28, 1861 and mustered in for a three-year enlistment under the command of Colonel James Mayland McCarter.

The regiment was attached to Peck's Brigade, Couch's Division, Army of the Potomac, to March 1862. 3rd Brigade, 1st Division, IV Corps, Army of the Potomac, to September 1862. 2nd Brigade, 3rd Division, VI Corps, Army of the Potomac, to November 1862. 3rd Brigade, 3rd Division, VI Corps, to January 1864. Wheaton's Brigade, Department of West Virginia, to March 1864. 1st Brigade, 2nd Division, VI Corps, Army of the Potomac, and Army of the Shenandoah, to June 1865.

The 93rd Pennsylvania Infantry mustered out of service June 27, 1865.

== Detailed service ==
1861

September 21 through October 28 - Regiment formed and mustered into service for a three-year enlistment, Lebanon Pa.

Nov 21 - Left Pennsylvania for Washington, D.C.

1862

Duty in the defenses of Washington until March 1862

March 10–15 - Advance on Manassas, Va.

March 25 - Moved to the Peninsula

April 5-May 4 - Siege of Yorktown

May 5 - Battle of Williamsburg

May 20–23 - Reconnaissance to the Chickahominy and Bottom's Bridge

May 31-June 1 - Battle of Seven Pines

June 25-July 1 - Seven Days before Richmond

June 27 - Seven Pines

July 1 - Malvern Hill

At Harrison's Landing until August 16

August 16–30 - Movement to Alexandria, then to Centreville

August 30-September 1 - Covered Pope's retreat to Fairfax Court House

September 1 - Chantilly

September 6–24 - Maryland Campaign

September 12–14 - Reconnaissance to Harpers Ferry and Sandy Hook

September 16–17 - Battle of Antietam (reserve)

September 23-October 20 - At Downsville, Md.

October 20-November 18 - Movement to Stafford Court House

December 5 - Movement to Belle Plains

December 12–15 - Battle of Fredericksburg

1863

January 20–24 - Burnside's second campaign, "Mud March"

At Falmouth until April

April 27-May 6 - Chancellorsville Campaign

April 29-May 2 - Operations at Franklin's Crossing, Fredericksburg

May 3 - Maryes Heights

May 3–4 - Salem Heights

May 4 - Banks' Ford

June 13-July 24 - Gettysburg Campaign

July 2–4 - Battle of Gettysburg

July 5–24 - Pursuit of Lee

Duty on the line of the Rappahannock until October

October 9–22 - Bristoe Campaign

November 7–8 - Advance to line of the Rappahannock

November 7 - Rappahannock Station

November 26-December 2 - Mine Run Campaign

1864

February 7, 1864 - Regiment reenlisted

Duty at Brandy Station until May

May 4-June 12 - Rapidan Campaign

May 5–7 - Battle of the Wilderness

May 8–21 - Spotsylvania

May 12 - Assault on the Salient

May 23–26 - North Anna River

May 26–28 - On line of the Pamunkey

May 28–31 - Totopotomoy

June 1–12 - Cold Harbor

Before Petersburg June 17–18

Siege of Petersburg until July 9

June 22–23 - Jerusalem Plank Road

July 9–11 - Moved to Washington. D.C.

July 11–12 - Defense of Washington against Early's attack

July 14–18 - Pursuit to Snicker's Gap

Sheridan's Shenandoah Valley Campaign August to December

August 21–22 - Charlestown

September 13 - Demonstration on Gilbert's Ford, Opequan Creek

September 19 - Battle of Opequan

September 21 - Strasburg

September 22 - Fisher's Hill

October 19 - Battle of Cedar Creek

Duty in the Shenandoah Valley until December

December 9–12 - Moved to Petersburg

Dec 1864-1865

Siege of Petersburg December 1864 to April 1865

February 5–7 - Dabney's Mills, Hatcher's Run

March 25 - Fort Stedman, Petersburg

March 28-April 9 - Appomattox Campaign

April 2 - Assault on and fall of Petersburg

April 3–9 - Pursuit of Lee

April 9 - Appomattox Court House

Surrender of Lee and his army

April 23–27 - Marched to Danville and duty there until May 23

May 23-June 3 - Moved to Richmond, Va., then to Washington. D.C.

June 8 - Corps review

June 27, 1865 - Regiment was mustered out of service

== Casualties ==
The regiment lost a total of 274 men during service; 11 officers and 161 enlisted men killed or mortally wounded, 1 officer and 111 enlisted men died of disease.

== Commanders ==
- Colonel James Mayland McCarter - discharged November 29, 1862; re-mustered April 1, 1863 and resigned August 21, 1863
- Colonel John M. Mark - commanded at the Battle of Fredericksburg while at the rank of lieutenant colonel; discharged May 21, 1863
- Colonel Charles W. Eckman
- Lieutenant Colonel David C. Keller - commanded at the Battle of Cedar Creek while still at the rank of captain; commanded at the Battle of Fort Stedman
- Major John I. Nevin - commanded at the Battle of Gettysburg
- Captain John S. Long - commanded at the Battle of Chancellorsville
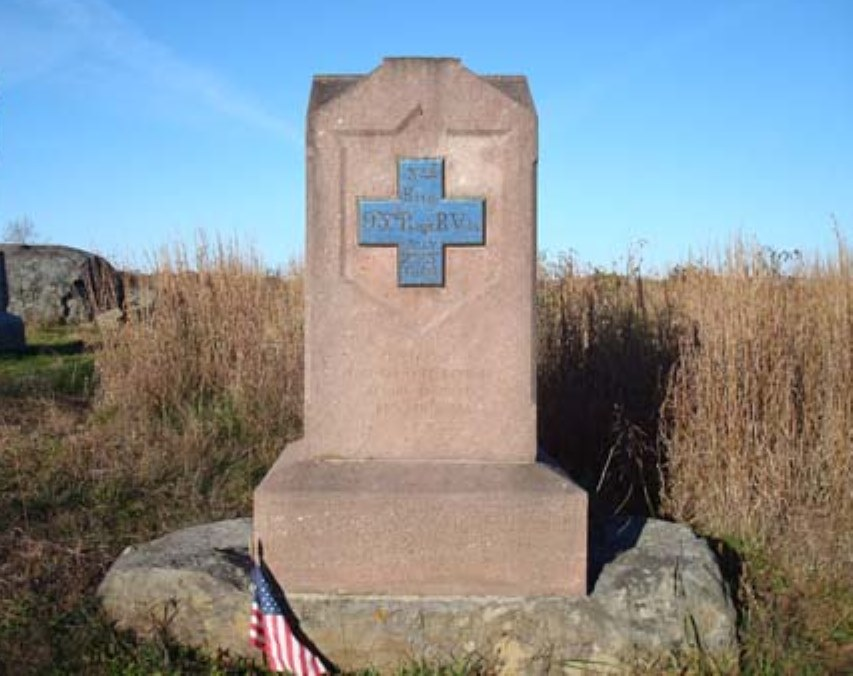
93rd Pennsylvania Infantry Monument (1884), Sedgwick Avenue, Gettysburg Battlefield

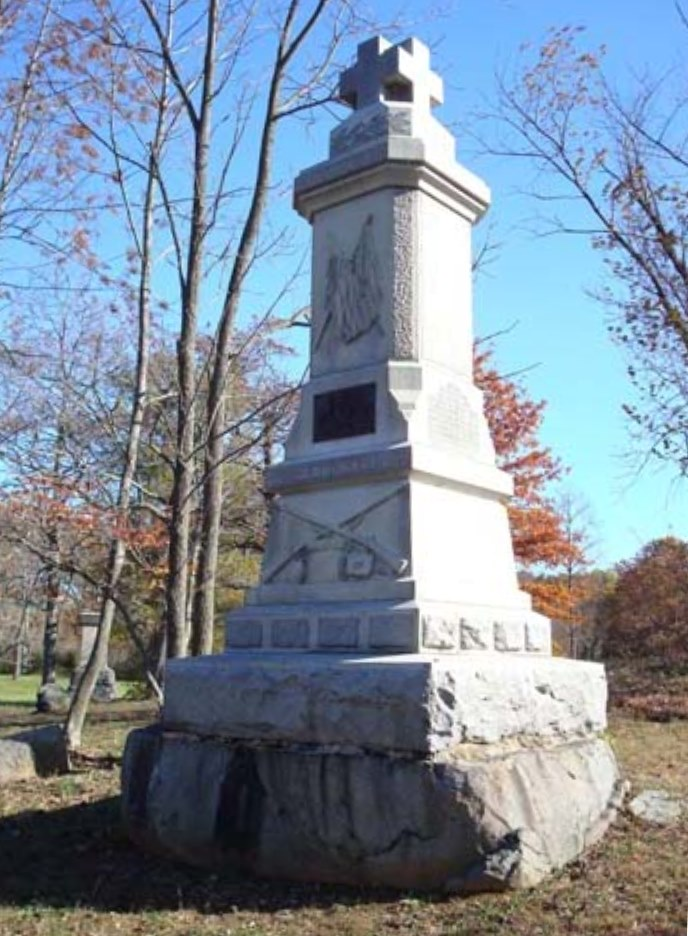
93rd Pennsylvania Infantry Monument (1888), Weikert Farm, Gettysburg Battlefield

== See also ==
- List of Pennsylvania Civil War Units
- Pennsylvania in the Civil War
