= 43rd United States Colored Infantry Regiment =

Union Army African American infantry regiment

43rd United States Colored Infantry
- Active: March 12, 1864 - November 30, 1865
- Country: United States
- Allegiance: Union
- Branch: Infantry
- Engagements: Siege of Petersburg; Battle of the Crater; Battle of Globe Tavern; Battle of Peebles's Farm; Battle of Hatcher's Run; Appomattox Campaign; Third Battle of Petersburg; Battle of Appomattox Court House

The 43rd United States Colored Infantry was an infantry regiment that served in the Union Army during the American Civil War. The regiment was composed of African American enlisted men commanded by white officers and was authorized by the Bureau of Colored Troops which was created by the United States War Department on May 22, 1863.

== Service ==
The 43rd U.S. Colored Infantry was organized in Philadelphia, Pennsylvania beginning March 12, 1864 for three-year service under the command of Colonel Stephen Bates Yeoman.

The regiment was attached to 1st Brigade, 4th Division, IX Corps, Army of the Potomac, to September 1864. 1st Brigade, 3rd Division, IX Corps, to December 1864. 3rd Brigade, 3rd Division, XXV Corps, to January 1865. 3rd Brigade, 1st Division, XXV Corps and Department of Texas, to October 1865.

At the Battle of the Crater, the 43rd not only captured a Confederate battle flag, but also re-captured a US flag "National Colors" previously captured from another Union regiment as well.

The 43rd U.S. Colored Infantry mustered out of service October 20, 1865 and was discharged at Philadelphia on November 30, 1865.

== Detailed service ==
Moved to Annapolis, Md., April 18. Campaign from the Rapidan River to the James River, Va., May–June 1864. Guarded supply trains of the Army of the Potomac through the Wilderness and to Petersburg. Before Petersburg June 15–19. Siege operations against Petersburg and Richmond June 16, 1864 to April 2, 1865. Mine Explosion, Petersburg, July 30, 1864. Weldon Railroad August 18–21. Poplar Grove Church September 29–30 and October 1. Boydton Plank Road, Hatcher's Run, October 27–28. On the Bermuda Hundred front and before Richmond until March 1865. Moved to Hatcher's Run March 27–28. Appomattox Campaign March 28-April 9. Hatcher's Run March 29–31. Fall of Petersburg April 2. Pursuit of Lee April 3–9. Appomattox Court House April 9. Surrender of Lee and his army. Duty at Petersburg and City Point until May 30. Moved to Texas May 30-June 10. Duty on the Rio Grande opposite Matamoros, Mexico, until October.

== Casualties ==
The regiment lost a total of 239 men during service; 3 officers and 48 enlisted men killed or mortally wounded, 188 enlisted men died of disease.

== Commanders ==
- Colonel Stephen Bates Yeoman - promoted to brevet brigadier general of volunteers on March 15, 1865
- Captain Jesse Wilkinson - commanded at the Battle of the Crater

== See also ==
- List of United States Colored Troops Civil War Units
- United States Colored Troops

== Bibliography ==
- Dyer, Frederick H. A Compendium of the War of the Rebellion (Des Moines, IA: Dyer Pub. Co.), 1908.
- Hall, Henry Seymour. Personal Experience of a Staff Officer at Mine Run and Albemarle County Raid, and as Commander of the 43rd Regiment U.S. Colored Troops, Through the Wilderness Campaign, and at the Mine Before Petersburg, Virginia: From November 7, 1863, to July 30, 1864: A Paper Prepared and Read Before the Kansas Commandery of the Military Order of the Loyal Legion of the United States, October 3, 1894 (Leavenworth, KS: s.n.), 1894.
- Mickley, Jeremiah Marion. The Forty-Third Regiment United States Colored Troops (Gettysburg, PA: J. E. Wible, Printer), 1866.

Attribution
