= 95th New York Infantry Regiment =

- State flag from 1778 to 1901
- Active: November 1861 to July 16, 1865
- Country: United States
- Allegiance: Union
- Branch: Infantry
- Nickname: Warren Rifles
- Engagements: Battle of Gainesville; Second Battle of Bull Run; Battle of South Mountain; Battle of Antietam; Battle of Fredericksburg; Battle of Chancellorsville; Battle of Gettysburg; Bristoe Campaign; Mine Run Campaign; Battle of the Wilderness; Battle of Spotsylvania Court House; Battle of North Anna; Battle of Cold Harbor; Siege of Petersburg; Battle of Globe Tavern; Battle of Peebles' Farm; Battle of Boydton Plank Road; Battle of Hatcher's Run; Appomattox Campaign; Battle of Five Forks; Battle of Appomattox Court House

Commanders
- Colonel: George H. Biddle
- Colonel: Edward Pye
- Colonel: James Creney

Insignia
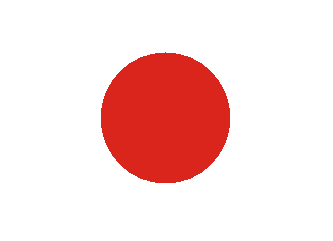
- 1st Division, I Corps

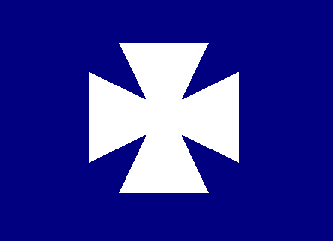
- 2nd Division, V Corps

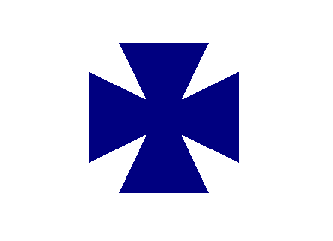
- 3rd Division, V Corps

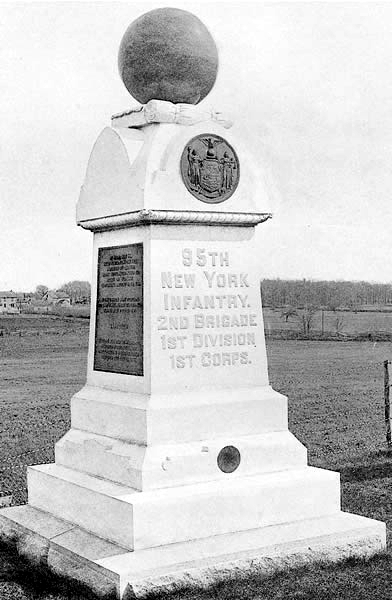
Monument to the 95th New York Volunteer at Gettysburg

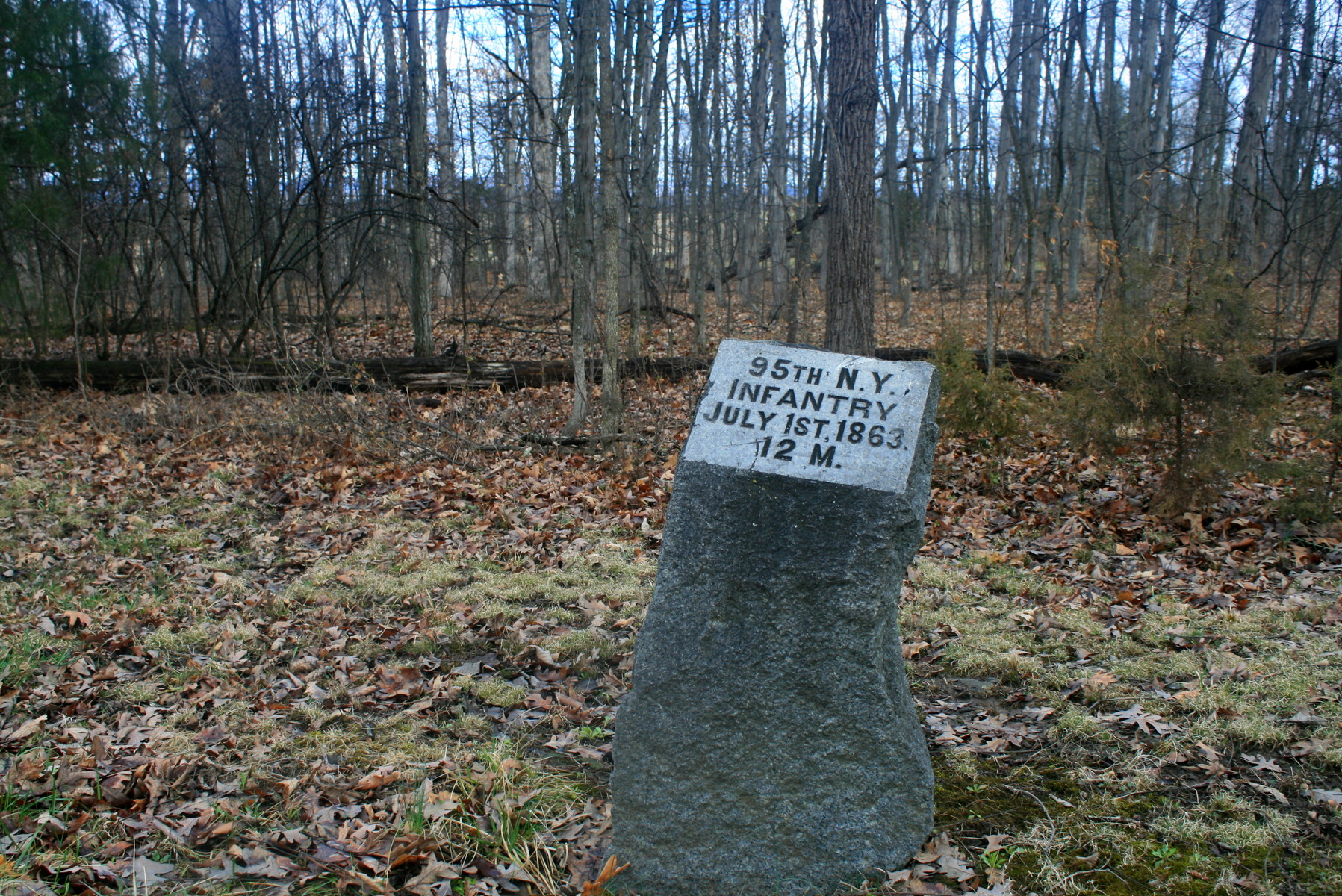
95th Gettysburg's position marker as of July 1, 1863

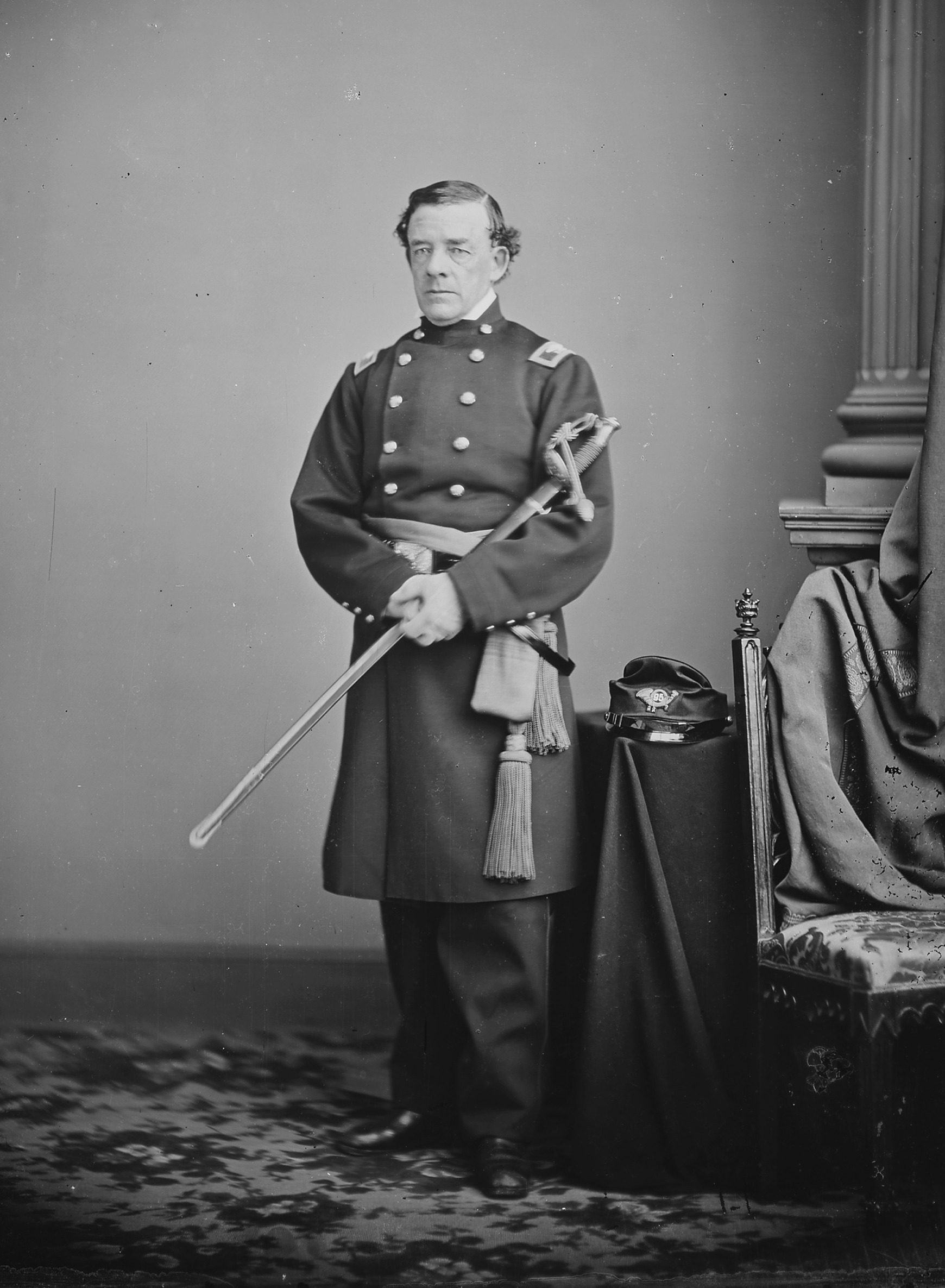
Col. George H. Biddle, 95th N.Y.

The 95th New York Infantry Regiment ("Warren Rifles") was an infantry regiment in the Union Army during the American Civil War.

== Service ==
The 95th New York Infantry was organized at New York City, New York beginning in November 1861 and mustered in for three years service on March 6, 1862 under the command of Colonel George H. Biddle. The companies were recruited principally: A, B, C, D, G and H in New York City; E in Brooklyn and New York City; F at Haverstraw; I at Sing Sing; and K at Carmel, Peekskill, Sing Sing and White Plains.

The regiment was attached to Wadsworth's Command, Military District of Washington, D.C., to May 1862. Doubleday's Brigade, Department of the Rappahannock, to June 1862. 2nd Brigade, 1st Division, III Corps, Army of Virginia, to September 1862. 2nd Brigade, 1st Division, I Corps, Army of the Potomac, to March 1864. 2nd Brigade, 4th Division, V Corps, to August 1864. 3rd Brigade, 2nd Division, V Corps, to September 1864. 3rd Brigade, 3rd Division, V Corps, to July 1865.

The 95th New York Infantry mustered out of service on July 16, 1865.

== Detailed service ==
Left New York for Washington, D.C., March 18, 1862. Duty in the defenses of Washington, D, C., until May 1862, and at Aquia Creek, Va., until June. Duty at and near Fredericksburg until August. Pope's Campaign in northern Virginia August 16-September 2. Fords of the Rappahannock August 21–23. Sulphur Springs August 26. Battles of Gainesville August 28; Groveton August 29; Bull Run August 30. Maryland Campaign September 6–22. Battles of South Mountain September 14; Antietam September 16–17. Duty at Sharpsburg, Md., until October 30. Movement to Falmouth, Va., October 30-November 19. Union November 2–3. Battle of Fredericksburg, Va., December 12–15. At Falmouth and Belle Plains until April 27, 1863. "Mud March" January 20–24. Chancellorsville Campaign April 27-May 6. Operations at Fitzhugh's Crossing April 29-May 2. Battle of Chancellorsville May 1–5. Gettysburg Campaign June 11-July 24. Battle of Gettysburg, July 1–3. Pursuit of Lee to Manassas Gap, Va., July 5–24. Duty on line of the Rappahannock and Rapidan to October. Bristoe Campaign October 9–22. Advance to line of the Rappahannock November 7–8. Mine Run Campaign November 26-December 2. Demonstration on the Rapidan February 6–7, 1864. Campaign from the Rapidan to the James May 3-June 15. Battles of the Wilderness May 5–7; Laurel Hill May 8; Spotsylvania May 8–12; Spotsylvania Court House May 12–21. Assault on the Salient May 12. North Anna River May 23–26. Jericho Ford May 23. On line of the Pamunkey May 26–28. Totopotomoy May 28–31. Cold Harbor June 1–12. Bethesda Church June 1–3. Before Petersburg June 16–18. Siege of Petersburg June 16, 1864 to April 2, 1865. Mine Explosion, Petersburg, July 30, 1864 (reserve). Weldon Railroad August 18–21. Poplar Springs Church September 29-October 2. Boydton Plank Road, Hatcher's Run, October 27–28. Warren's Raid on Weldon Railroad December 7–12. Dabney's Mills, Hatcher's Run, February 5–7, 1865. Appomattox Campaign March 28-April 9. Lewis Farm, near Gravelly Run, March 29. White Oak Road March 31. Five Forks April 1. Fall of Petersburg April 2. Pursuit of Lee April 3–9. Appomattox Court House April 9. Surrender of Lee and his army. Moved to Washington, D.C., May 1–12. Grand Review of the Armies May 23. Duty at Washington until July.

== Casualties ==
The regiment lost a total of 256 men during service; 5 officers and 114 enlisted men killed or mortally wounded, 1 officer and 136 enlisted men died of disease.

== Commanders ==
- Colonel George H. Biddle
- Colonel Edward Pye - commanded at the Battle of Gettysburg while still at the rank of major after Col. Biddle was wounded on July 1; mortally wounded at the Battle of Cold Harbor, June 2
- Colonel James Creney
- Lieutenant Colonel James B. Post - commanded at the Second Battle of Bull Run
- Major Robert W. Bard - commanded the regiment at the Battle of Cold Harbor after Col. Pye was mortally wounded

== See also ==
- List of New York Civil War regiments
- New York in the Civil War
