= 104th New York Infantry Regiment =

- Active: October 1861 to July 17, 1865
- Country: United States
- Allegiance: Union
- Branch: Infantry
- Engagements: Battle of Cedar Mountain; Second Battle of Bull Run; Battle of Chantilly; Battle of South Mountain; Battle of Antietam; Battle of Fredericksburg; Battle of Chancellorsville; Battle of Gettysburg; Bristoe Campaign; Mine Run Campaign; Battle of the Wilderness; Battle of Spotsylvania Court House; Battle of North Anna; Battle of Totopotomoy Creek; Battle of Cold Harbor; Siege of Petersburg; Battle of Globe Tavern; Battle of Hatcher's Run; Appomattox Campaign; Battle of Five Forks; Third Battle of Petersburg; Battle of Appomattox Court House

The 104th New York Infantry Regiment ("Wadsworth Guards" or "Livingston County Regiment") was an infantry regiment in the Union Army during the American Civil War.

== Service ==
The 104th New York Infantry was organized at Geneseo, New York beginning in October 1861 and mustered in for three years service on March 4, 1862 under the command of Colonel John Rohrbach.

The regiment was attached to Wadsworth's Command, Military District of Washington, to May 1862. 2nd Brigade, 2nd Division, Department of the Rappahannock, to June 1862. 1st Brigade, 2nd Division, III Corps, Army of Virginia, to September 1862. 1st Brigade, 2nd Division, I Corps, Army of the Potomac, to March 1864. 1st Brigade, 2nd Division, V Corps, to June 1864. 1st Brigade, 3rd Division, V Corps, to August 1864. 2nd Brigade, 3rd Division, V Corps, to September 1864. Provost Guard, V Corps, to May 1865. 2nd Brigade, 3rd Division, V Corps, to July 1865.

The 104th New York Infantry mustered out of service on July 17, 1865.

== Detailed service ==
- Left New York for Washington, D.C., March 22, 1862. Duty in the defenses of Washington, D.C., until May.
- Expedition to Front Royal, Va., to intercept Jackson, May 28-June 1. Picket duty on the Shenandoah and at Front Royal until June 10.
- Duty at Catlett's Station, Warrenton and Waterloo, Va., until August.
- Battle of Cedar Mountain August 9.
- Pope's Campaign in northern Virginia August 16-September 2. Fords of the Rappahannock August 21–23. Thoroughfare Gap August 28. Groveton August 29. Bull Run August 30. Chantilly September 1.
- Maryland Campaign September 6–22. Battles of South Mountain September 14; Antietam September 16–17.
- Duty near Sharpsburg until October 30.
- Movement to Falmouth, Va., October 30-November 19.
- Battle of Fredericksburg, December 12–15.
- At Falmouth and Belle Plains until April 27, 1863. "Mud March" January 20–24. Chancellorsville Campaign April 27-May 6.
- Operations at Fitzhugh's Crossing April 29-May 2.
- Battle of Chancellorsville May 2–5.
- Gettysburg Campaign June 11-July 24. Battle of Gettysburg, July 1–3. Pursuit of Lee July 5–24.
- Duty on line of the Rappahannock and Rapidan until October.
- Bristoe Campaign October 9–22. Advance to line of the Rappahannock November 7–8.
- Mine Run Campaign November 26-December 2.
- Demonstration on the Rapidan February 6–7, 1864.
- Campaign from the Rapidan to the James May 3-June 15. Battles of the Wilderness May 5–7; Laurel Hill May 8; Spotsylvania May 8–12; Spotsylvania Court House May 12–21. Assault on the Salient May 12. North Anna River May 23–26. Jericho Ford May 23. On line of the Pamunkey May 26–28. Totopotomoy May 28–31. Cold Harbor June 1–12. Bethesda Church June 1–3. White Oak Swamp June 13. Before Petersburg June 16–18. Siege of Petersburg June 16, 1864 to April 2, 1865. Mine Explosion, Petersburg, July 30, 1864 (reserve).
- Weldon Railroad August 18–21.
- Reconnaissance toward Dinwiddie Court House September 15.
- Warren's Raid on Weldon Railroad December 7–12.
- Dabney's Mills, Hatcher's Run, February 5–7, 1865.
- Appomattox Campaign March 28-April 9. Lewis Farm, near Gravelly Run, March 29. White Oak Road March 31. Five Forks April 1. Fall of Petersburg April 2. Pursuit of Lee April 3–9.
- Appomattox Court House April 9. Surrender of Lee and his army.
- Moved to Washington, D.C., May 1–12. Grand Review of the Armies May 23. Duty at Washington until July.

== Casualties ==
The regiment lost a total of 233 men during service; 5 officers and 81 enlisted men killed or mortally wounded, 2 officers and 145 enlisted men died of disease.

== Commanders ==
- Colonel John Rohrbach - discharged October 21, 1862 due to disability
- Colonel Lewis C. Skinner
- Colonel Gilbert G. Prey
- Colonel John R. Strang
- Major Lewis C. Skinner - commanded at the Battle of Antietam

== Flags ==
The regiment carried 2 flags during its service, one of the flags was a National flag with the motto: "Wadsworth Guards." The other was a regimental flag with a blue field with the coat of arms of the state in the middle. Above it is a scroll bearing the name and number of the regiment, right below the coat of arms is another scroll with the state motto. The inscription "Wadsworth Guards," is placed right above the top scroll. The flag was made by the Tiffany Co. and given to General James S. Wadsworth in the spring of 1862.

== See also ==
- List of New York Civil War regiments
- New York in the Civil War
