= 66th New York Infantry Regiment =

- Active: November 4, 1861, to August 30, 1865
- Country: United States
- Allegiance: Union
- Branch: Infantry
- Type: Infantry
- Size: 775 (Note: As reported back to Adjutant General Hillhouse upon departure from New York on November 16, 1861)
- Nickname: Governor's Guard
- Equipment: Fusil d'Infanterie Mle 1842 (18mm/.69 caliber, rifled), Lorenz Model 1854 (.54 caliber, rifled)
- Engagements: American Civil War: Siege of Yorktown; Battle of Seven Pines Seven Days Battles; Battle of Antietam; Battle of Fredericksburg; Battle of Chancellorsville; Battle of Gettysburg; Bristoe Campaign; Mine Run Campaign; Battle of the Wilderness; Battle of Spotsylvania Court House; Battle of Cold Harbor; Siege of Petersburg; Second Battle of Petersburg; Battle of Jerusalem Plank Road; First Battle of Deep Bottom; Second Battle of Deep Bottom; Second Battle of Ream's Station; Appomattox Campaign; Battle of White Oak Road; Third Battle of Petersburg; Battle of Sutherland's Station; Battle of Sailor's Creek; Battle of High Bridge; Battle of Appomattox Court House

Commanders
- Colonel: Joseph C Pinckney
- Colonel: Orlando H. Morris
- Colonel: John S. Hammell

Insignia
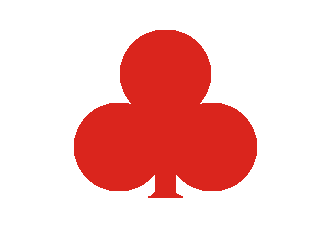
- 1st Division, II Corps

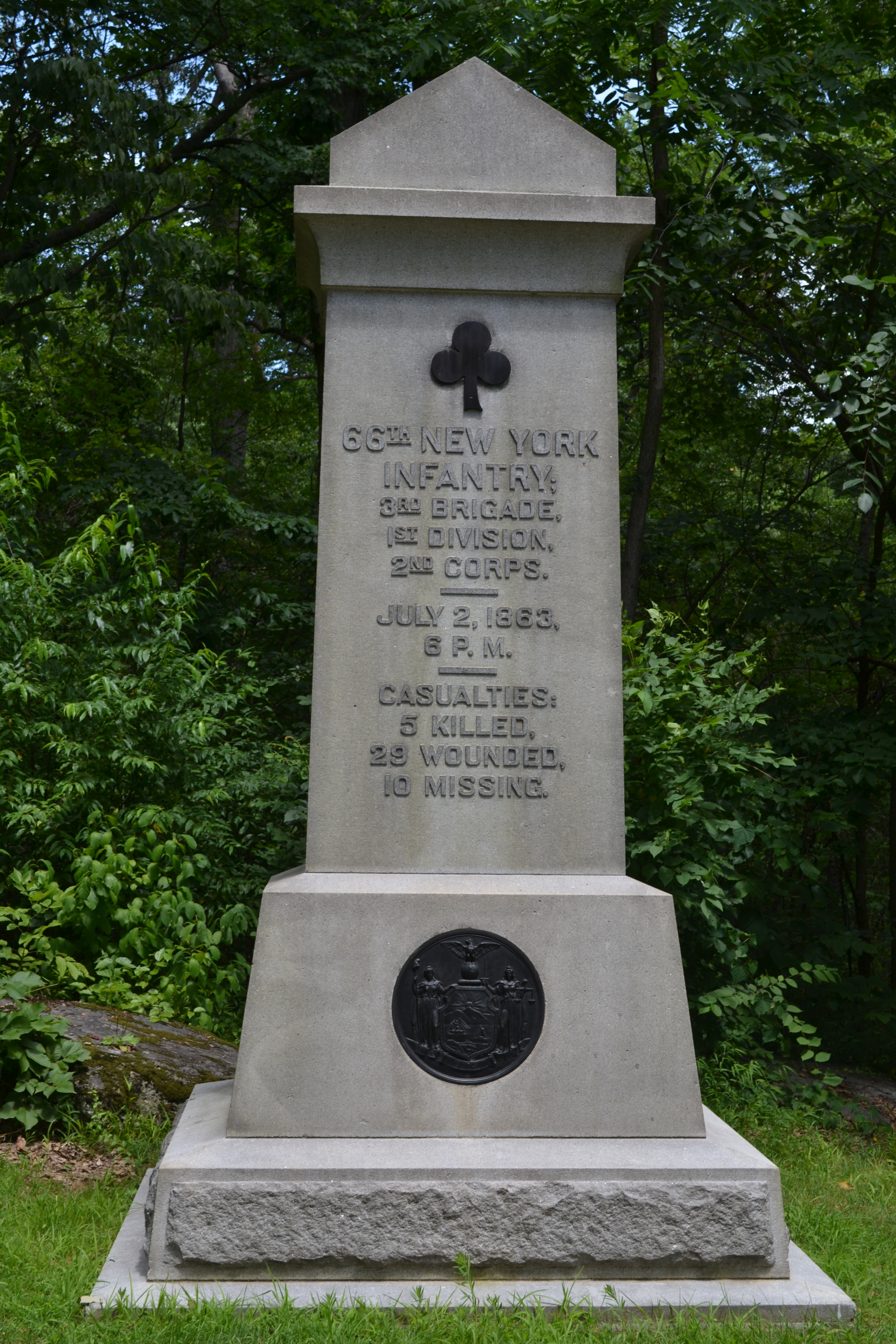
Monument to the 66th New York Volunteer Infantry at Gettysburg

The 66th New York Infantry Regiment (or National Guard Rifles) was an infantry regiment in the Union Army during the American Civil War.

== Service ==
The 66th New York Infantry was organized at New York City, New York and mustered in for three years service on November 4, 1861, under the command of Colonel Joseph C. Pinckney.

The regiment was attached to Graham's Brigade, Buell's Division, Army of the Potomac, to January 1862. French's Brigade, Sumner's Division, Army of the Potomac, to March 1862. 3rd Brigade, 1st Division, II Corps, to March 1864. 4th Brigade, 1st Division, II Corps, to May 1865. Fort Richardson, New York, to August 1865.

The 66th New York Infantry mustered out of service August 30, 1865.

== Detailed service ==
The 66th, the "Governor's Guard," was the outgrowth of the 6th Militia, recruited mainly in New York City, and was mustered into the U. S. service at New York, November 4, 1861, for a three-year term. It left New York for Washington, November 16, 1861, was assigned to Graham's Brigade, Buell's Division, until January 1862, when it became a part of French's Brigade, Sumner's Division, which became in March, the 3rd Brigade, 1st Division, II Corps, Army of the Potomac. It reached the Peninsula in time to be present during the latter part of the siege of Yorktown; was active at Fair Oaks and during the Seven Days Battles, but suffered its most severe loss at Antietam, where 103 were killed, wounded, or captured, among them Chaplain Dwight, who was in the midst of the fight. The 66th proceeded through Charlestown, West Virginia, and Snicker's Gap, to Fredericksburg, where it lost 75 in killed, wounded, and missing out of 238 engaged. It was then in the 3rd (Zook's) Brigade of Hancock's division, which also suffered severely at Chancellorsville, the loss of the 66th being 70 men. II Corps continued to see arduous service through the hard-fought field of Gettysburg and the actions at Auburn and Bristoe Station, the last being a II Corps engagement. After the Mine Run movement the regiment went into winter quarters with the Army of the Potomac and when the spring campaign opened, was assigned to the 4th Brigade of its old division. In Grant's campaign in the Wilderness the heaviest losses of the 66th were suffered during the first week, but it continued in active service through Cold Harbor, where Col. Morris, commanding the brigade was killed, and the Siege of Petersburg, losing heavily in the first assault on the fortifications. In the autumn of 1864 the original members not reenlisted were mustered out and the reenlisted men and recruits remained at the front as a veteran organization. After the fall of Petersburg the regiment was ordered to Fort Richmond, New York Harbor, and there remained until August 30.

== Casualties ==
The regiment lost a total of 221 men during service; 9 officers and 88 enlisted men killed or mortally wounded, 4 officers and 120 enlisted men died of disease.

== Armament ==
The State of New York issued the 66th 774 imported .69* caliber Fusil d'Infanterie Mle 1842 rifle-muskets. A year later, the regiment reported that they had turned in these arms and held 700 short Austrian rifled muskets. (Note: These were actually most likely M1854 Jäger rifle (Bavaria) which were frequently imported through Austrian exporters in the Adriatic. This percussion weapon combines French and German features with a browned barrel and a rear sight with windage adjustment. It is 50.25 inches (1,276 mm) long, with a .69 caliber 35.75-inch (908 mm) barrel. This is among the last military designs prior to adopting the Minie type ammunition) As the service continued, the 1842 muskets were gradually replaced by imported French Fusil d'Infanterie Mle 1842 rifle muskets. By the end of the first full year of hard campaigning, the regimented reported possession of 344 Enfield P1853s, 424 Mle 1842, and 62 Prussian Potsdam smoothbore percussion muskets (.71 caliber).

=== Rifle-muskets ===
Issued weapons

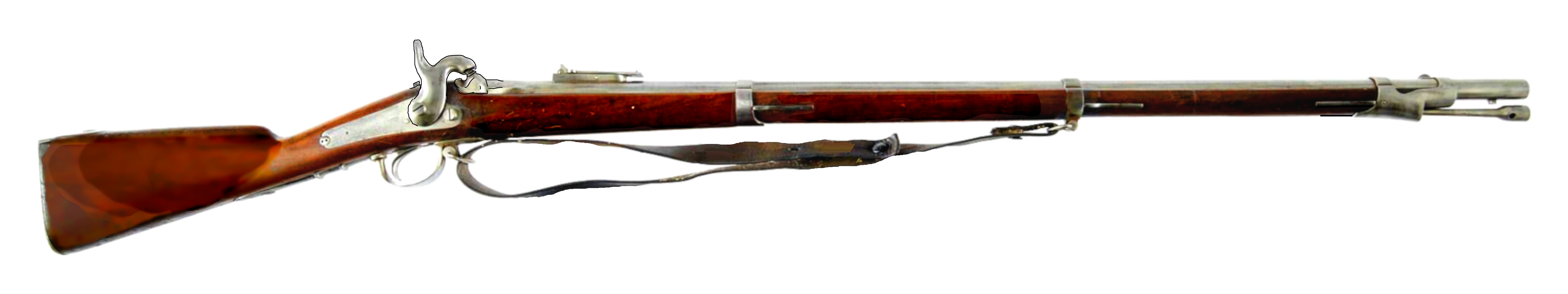
French .69 Cal Model 1842

== Commanders ==
- Colonel Joseph C. Pinckney
- Colonel Orlando H. Morris - wounded in action at the Battle of Gettysburg, July 2; killed in action at the Battle of Cold Harbor while leading 4th Brigade, First Division, II Corps
- Colonel John S. Hammell - commanded at the Battle of Gettysburg as lieutenant colonel after Col Morris was wounded; also wounded on July 2
- Major Peter A. Nelson - commanded at the Battle of Gettysburg after Ltc Hammell was wounded
- Captain Julius Wehle - commanded at the Battle of Antietam
- Captain Nathaniel P. Lane - commanded at the First Battle of Deep Bottom

== In popular culture ==
- In the 2017 film The Beguiled, the film's protagonist, Corporal John McBurney (played by actor Colin Farrell), is a member of the 66th Regiment who finds refuge in a woman's boarding school in Virginia.

== See also ==
- List of New York Civil War regiments
- New York in the Civil War
