= Battle of Gettysburg order of battle: Union =

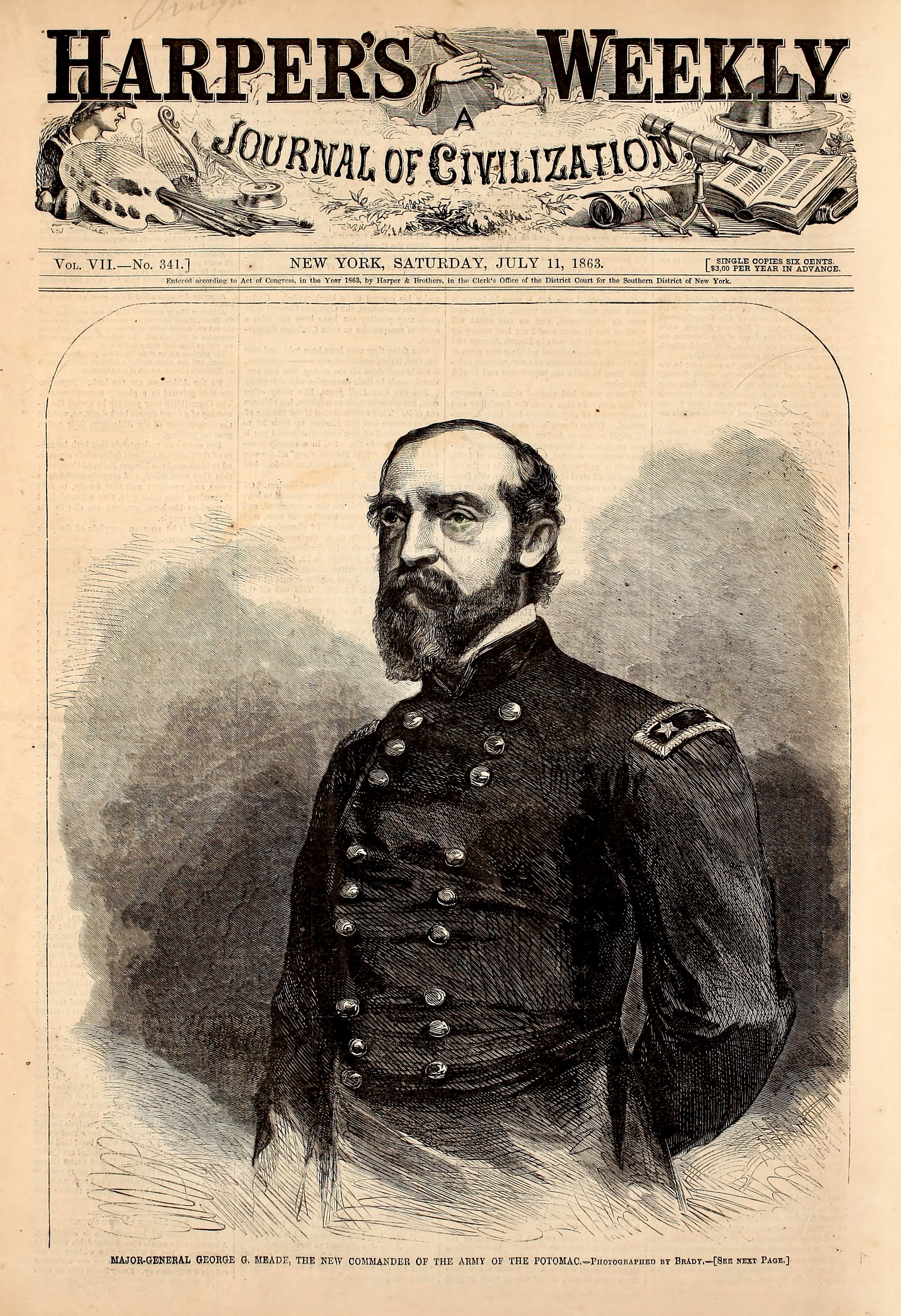
Harper's Weekly cover, July 11, 1863: "Major-General George G. Meade, the New Commander of the Army of the Potomac — Photographed by Brady"

The Union order of battle during the Battle of Gettysburg includes the American Civil War officers and men of the Army of the Potomac (multiple commander names indicate succession of command during the three-day battle (July 1–3, 1863)). Order of battle compiled from the army organization during the battle, the casualty returns and the reports.

== Abbreviations used ==
=== Military rank ===
- MG = Major General
- BG = Brigadier General
- Col = Colonel
- Ltc = Lieutenant Colonel
- Maj = Major
- Cpt = Captain
- Lt = Lieutenant
- Sgt = Sergeant

=== Other ===
- w = wounded
- mw = mortally wounded
- k = killed
- c = captured
- m = missing

== Army of the Potomac ==
MG George G. Meade, Commanding

=== General Staff and Headquarters ===
General Staff:

- Chief of Staff: MG Daniel Butterfield (w)
- Assistant Adjutant General: BG Seth Williams
- Assistant Inspector General: Col Edmund Schriver
- Chief Quartermaster: BG Rufus Ingalls
- Commissaries and subsistence: Col Henry F. Clarke
- Chief of Artillery: BG Henry J. Hunt (w)
- Chief Ordnance Officer: Cpt Daniel W. Flagler
- Chief Signal Officer: Cpt Lemuel B. Norton
- Medical Director: Maj Jonathan Letterman
- Chief of Engineers: BG Gouverneur K. Warren (w)
- Bureau of Military Information: Col George H. Sharpe

General Headquarters:
Command of the Provost Marshal General: BG Marsena R. Patrick

- 93rd New York: Col John S. Crocker
- 8th United States (8 companies): Cpt Edwin W. H. Read
- 2nd Pennsylvania Cavalry: Col Richard Butler Price
- 6th Pennsylvania Cavalry (Companies E & I): Cpt James Starr
- Regular cavalry

Guards and Orderlies:

- Oneida (New York) Cavalry: Cpt Daniel P. Mann

Engineer Brigade: BG Henry W. Benham

- 15th New York Engineers (3 companies): Maj Walter L. Cassin
- 50th New York Engineers: Col William H. Pettes
- U.S. Battalion: Cpt George H. Mendell

=== I Corps ===
MG John F. Reynolds (k)
MG Abner Doubleday
MG John Newton
General Headquarters:

- 1st Maine Cavalry, Company L: Cpt Constantine Taylor

Division	Brigade	Regiments and Others
First Division BG James S. Wadsworth	1st Brigade BG Solomon Meredith (w); Col William W. Robinson	19th Indiana: Col Samuel J. Williams (w), Ltc William W. Dudley (w), Maj John M. Lindley (w); 24th Michigan: Col Henry A. Morrow (w&c), Ltc Mark Flanigan (w), Maj Edwin B. Wight (w), Cpt Albert M. Edwards; 2nd Wisconsin: Col Lucius Fairchild (w&c), Ltc George H. Stevens (mw), Maj John Mansfield (w), Cpt George H. Otis; 6th Wisconsin: Ltc Rufus Dawes, Maj John F. Hauser; 7th Wisconsin: Col William W. Robinson, Ltc John B. Callis (w&c), Maj Mark Finnicum (w)
First Division BG James S. Wadsworth	2nd Brigade BG Lysander Cutler	7th Indiana: Col Ira G. Grover; 76th New York: Maj Andrew J. Grover (k, July 1), Cpt John E. Cook (w); 84th New York (14th Militia): Col Edward B. Fowler (w) Ltc R. B. Jordan (w); 95th New York: Col George H. Biddle (w, July 1), Maj Edward Pye; 147th New York: Ltc Francis C. Miller (w), Maj George Harney; 56th Pennsylvania (9 companies): Col William Hofmann
Second Division BG John C. Robinson	1st Brigade BG Gabriel R. Paul (w); Col Samuel H. Leonard (w); Col Adrian R. Root (w&c); Col Richard Coulter (w); Col Peter Lyle; Col Richard Coulter	16th Maine: Col Charles W. Tilden (c), Cpt Daniel Marston; 13th Massachusetts: Col Samuel H. Leonard, Ltc Nathaniel W. Batchelder; 94th New York: Col Adrian R. Root (w/c, July 1), Maj Samuel A. Moffett; 104th New York: Col Gilbert G. Prey, Ltc Henry Tuthill (w); 107th Pennsylvania: Ltc James McThomson (w, July 1), Cpt Emanuel D. Roath
Second Division BG John C. Robinson	2nd Brigade BG Henry Baxter	12th Massachusetts: Col James L. Bates (w), Ltc David Allen, Jr.; 83rd New York (9th Militia): Ltc Joseph A. Moesch; 97th New York: Col Charles Wheelock (w & c, July 1), Ltc John P. Spofford (c) Maj Charles B. Northrup; 11th Pennsylvania: Col Richard Coulter, Cpt Benjamin F. Haines (w), Cpt John B. Overmyer; 88th Pennsylvania: Maj Benezet F. Foust (w, July 1), Cpt Edmund A. Mass (c), Cpt Henry Whiteside; 90th Pennsylvania: Col Peter Lyle, Maj Alfred J. Sellers
Third Division MG Abner Doubleday; BG Thomas A. Rowley	1st Brigade Col Chapman Biddle (w); BG Thomas A. Rowley (w)	80th New York (20th Militia): Col Theodore B. Gates, Maj Walter A. Van Rensselaer (w); 121st Pennsylvania: Col Chapman Biddle, Maj Alexander Biddle; 142nd Pennsylvania: Col Robert P. Cummins (mw), Ltc Alfred B. McCalmont, Maj Horatio N. Warren; 151st Pennsylvania: Ltc George F. McFarland (w), Cpt Walter L. Owens, Col Harrison Allen
Third Division MG Abner Doubleday; BG Thomas A. Rowley	2nd Brigade Col Roy Stone (w); Col Langhorne Wister (w); Col Edmund L. Dana	143rd Pennsylvania: Col Edmund L. Dana, Ltc John D. Musser (w); 149th Pennsylvania: Ltc Walton Dwight (w), Cpt James Glenn; 150th Pennsylvania: Col Langhorne Wister, Ltc Henry S. Huidekoper (w), Maj Thomas Chamberlin (w), Cpt Cornelius C. Widdis (c), Cpt George W. Jones
Third Division MG Abner Doubleday; BG Thomas A. Rowley	3rd Brigade BG George J. Stannard (w); Col Francis V. Randall	13th Vermont: Col Francis V. Randall, Ltc William D. Munson (w), Maj Joseph J. Boynton; 14th Vermont: Col William T. Nichols, Ltc Charles W. Rose; 16th Vermont: Col Wheelock G. Veazey, Maj William Rounds
	Artillery Brigade Col Charles S. Wainwright	Maine Light, 2nd Battery (B): Cpt James A. Hall; Maine Light, 5th Battery (E): Cpt Greenlief T. Stevens (w), Lt Edward N. Whittier; 1st New York Light, Battery E & Battery L: Cpt Gilbert H. Reynolds (w, July 1), Lt George Breck; 1st Pennsylvania Light, Battery B: Cpt James H. Cooper; 4th United States, Battery B: Lt James Stewart (w), Lt James Davison (w)

=== II Corps ===
MG Winfield S. Hancock (w)
BG John Gibbon
BG William Hays
General Headquarters:

- 6th New York Cavalry, Companies D and K: Cpt Riley Johnson (Escort)
- 53rd Pennsylvania Infantry, Companies A, B and K: Maj Octavus Bull (Provost Marshal 2nd Corps)

Division	Brigade	Regiments and Others
First Division BG John C. Caldwell	1st Brigade Col Edward E. Cross (mw); Col H. Boyd McKeen	5th New Hampshire: Ltc Charles E. Hapgood, Maj Richard E. Cross; 61st New York: Ltc K. Oscar Broady; 81st Pennsylvania: Col Henry Boyd McKeen, Ltc Amos Stroh; 148th Pennsylvania: Col H. Boyd McKeen, Ltc Robert McFarlane, Maj Robert H. Foster
First Division BG John C. Caldwell	2nd Brigade Col Patrick Kelly	28th Massachusetts: Col Richard Byrnes; 63rd New York Infantry (2 companies): Ltc Richard C. Bentley (w), Cpt Thomas Touhy; 69th New York (2 companies): Cpt Richard Moroney (w), Lt James J. Smith; 88th New York Infantry (2 companies): Cpt Denis F. Burke; 116th Pennsylvania (4 companies): Maj St. Clair A. Mulholland
First Division BG John C. Caldwell	3rd Brigade BG Samuel K. Zook (mw July 2); Ltc Charles G. Freudenberg (w July 2); Col Richard P. Roberts (k); Ltc John Fraser	52nd New York: Ltc Charles G. Freudenberg (w July 2), Maj Edward Venuti (k), Cpt William Scherrer; 57th New York: Ltc Alford B. Chapman; 66th New York: Col Orlando H. Morris (w), Ltc John S. Hammell (w), Maj Peter A. Nelson; 140th Pennsylvania: Col Richard P. Roberts, Ltc John Fraser, Maj Thomas Rodgers
First Division BG John C. Caldwell	4th Brigade Col John R. Brooke (w)	27th Connecticut (2 companies): Ltc Henry C. Merwin (k), Maj James H. Coburn; 2nd Delaware: Col William P. Bailey (w July 2), Ltc David L. Stricker (w July 2), Cpt Charles H. Christman; 64th New York: Col Daniel G. Bingham (w), Maj Leman W. Bradley (w); 53rd Pennsylvania: Ltc Richards McMichael; 145th Pennsylvania (7 companies): Col Hiram Loomis Brown (w July 2), Cpt John W. Reynolds (w July 2), Cpt Moses W. Oliver
Second Division BG John Gibbon (w); BG William Harrow	1st Brigade BG William Harrow; Col Francis E. Heath (w)	19th Maine: Col Francis E. Heath, Ltc Henry W. Cunningham; 15th Massachusetts: Col George H. Ward (mw), Ltc George C. Joslin, Maj Isaac H. Hooper; 1st Minnesota: Col William Colvill, Jr. (w), Cpt Nathan S. Messick (k), Cpt Henry C. Coates; 82nd New York (2nd Militia): Ltc James Huston (mw), Maj Thomas W. Baird (w), Cpt John Darrow
Second Division BG John Gibbon (w); BG William Harrow	2nd Brigade BG Alexander S. Webb (w)	69th Pennsylvania: Col Dennis O'Kane (mw), Ltc Martin Tschudy (k), Maj James M. Duffy (w), Cpt William Davis; 71st Pennsylvania: Col Richard P. Smith, Ltc Charles Kochersperger; 72nd Pennsylvania: Col De Witt C. Baxter (w), Ltc Theodore Hesser, Maj Samuel Roberts; 106th Pennsylvania: Ltc William L. Curry, Maj John H. Stover
Second Division BG John Gibbon (w); BG William Harrow	3rd Brigade Col Norman J. Hall	19th Massachusetts: Col Arthur F. Devereux, Ltc Ansel D. Wass (w), Maj Edmund Rice (w); 20th Massachusetts: Col Paul Joseph Revere (mw), Ltc George N. Macy (w), Cpt Henry L. Abbott; 7th Michigan: Ltc Amos E. Steele (k), Maj Sylvanus W. Curtiss; 42nd New York: Col James E. Mallon; 59th New York (4 companies): Ltc Max A. Thoman (mw), Cpt William McFadden
Second Division BG John Gibbon (w); BG William Harrow	unattached	Massachusetts Sharpshooters, 1st Company: Cpt William Plumer, Lt Emerson L. Bicknell
Third Division BG Alexander Hays	1st Brigade Col Samuel S. Carroll	14th Indiana: Col John Coons, Ltc Elijah H. C. Cavins, Maj William Houghton; 4th Ohio: Ltc Leonard W. Carpenter, Maj Gordon A. Stewart; 8th Ohio: Ltc Franklin Sawyer (w); 7th West Virginia: Ltc Jonathan H. Lockwood (w)
Third Division BG Alexander Hays	2nd Brigade Col Thomas A. Smyth (w); Ltc Francis E. Pierce	14th Connecticut: Maj Theodore G. Ellis; 1st Delaware: Ltc Edward P. Harris, Cpt Thomas B. Hizar (w), Lt William Smith (k), Lt John T. Dent; 12th New Jersey: Maj John T. Hill; 10th New York (battalion): Maj George F. Hopper; 108th New York: Ltc Francis E. Pierce
Third Division BG Alexander Hays	3rd Brigade Col George L. Willard (k); Col Eliakim Sherrill; Ltc James M. Bull; Col Clinton D. MacDougall (w); Col Eliakim Sherrill (mw, July 3)	39th New York (4 companies): Maj Hugo Hildebrandt (w); 111th New York: Col Clinton D. MacDougall, Ltc Isaac M. Lusk (w), Cpt Aaron P. Seeley; 125th New York: Ltc Levin Crandell; 126th New York: Col Eliakim Sherrill, Ltc James M. Bull
	Artillery Brigade Cpt John G. Hazard	1st New York Light, Battery B: Cpt James M. Rorty (k), Lt Albert S. Sheldon (w), Lt Robert E. Rogers; 1st Rhode Island Light, Battery A: Cpt William A. Arnold; 1st Rhode Island Light, Battery B: Lt Thomas F. Brown (w), Lt William S. Perrin; 1st United States, Battery I: Lt George A. Woodruff (mw), Lt Tully McCrea; 4th United States, Battery A: Lt Alonzo H. Cushing (k), Lt Samuel Canby (w), Lt Joseph S. Milne (k), Sgt Frederick Füger

=== III Corps ===
MG Daniel E. Sickles (w)
MG David B. Birney (w)

Division	Brigade	Regiments and Others
First Division MG David B. Birney; BG J. H. Hobart Ward (w)	1st Brigade BG Charles K. Graham (w&c); Col Andrew H. Tippin; Col Henry J. Madill	57th Pennsylvania (8 companies): Col Peter Sides (w, July 2), Maj William B. Neeper (w&c), Cpt Alanson H. Nelson (w); 63rd Pennsylvania: Maj John A. Danks; 68th Pennsylvania: Col Andrew H. Tippin, Ltc Anthony H. Reynolds (w), Maj Robert E. Winslow (w), Cpt Milton S. Davis; 105th Pennsylvania: Col Calvin A. Craig; 114th Pennsylvania: Ltc Frederick F. Cavada (c), Cpt Edward R. Bowen; 141st Pennsylvania: Col Henry J. Madill, Maj Israel P. Spaulding (mw&c)
First Division MG David B. Birney; BG J. H. Hobart Ward (w)	2nd Brigade BG J. H. Hobart Ward; Col Hiram Berdan	20th Indiana: Col John Wheeler (k), Ltc William C. L. Taylor (w); 3rd Maine: Col Moses B. Lakeman, Maj Samuel P. Lee (w); 4th Maine: Col Elijah Walker (w), Maj Ebenezer Whitcomb (mw), Cpt Edwin Libby; 86th New York: Ltc Benjamin L. Higgins (w, July 2), Maj Jacob H. Lansing; 124th New York: Col Augustus van H. Ellis (k), Ltc Francis M. Cummins (w), Maj James Cromwell (k); 99th Pennsylvania: Maj John W. Moore (w), Cpt Peter Fritz, Jr.; 1st United States Sharpshooters: Col Hiram Berdan, Ltc Casper Trepp; 2nd United States Sharpshooters (8 companies): Maj Homer R. Stoughton
First Division MG David B. Birney; BG J. H. Hobart Ward (w)	3rd Brigade Col P. Régis de Trobriand	17th Maine: Ltc Charles B. Merrill, Maj George W. West; 3rd Michigan: Col Byron R. Pierce (w), Ltc Edwin S. Pierce, Maj Moses B. Houghton; 5th Michigan: Ltc John Pulford (w), Maj Salmon S. Matthews (w); 40th New York: Col Thomas W. Egan (w), Ltc Augustus J. Warner (w); 110th Pennsylvania (6 companies): Ltc David M. Jones (w July 2), Maj Isaac Rogers
Second Division BG Andrew A. Humphreys	1st Brigade BG Joseph B. Carr (w)	1st Massachusetts: Ltc Clark B. Baldwin (w), Maj Gardner Walker (w); 11th Massachusetts: Ltc Porter D. Tripp, Maj Andrew N. McDonald (w); 16th Massachusetts: Ltc Waldo Merriam (w, July 2), Cpt Matthew Donovan; 12th New Hampshire: Cpt John F. Langley (w), Cpt Thomas E. Barker; 11th New Jersey: Col Robert McAllister (w), Maj Philip J. Kearny (mw), Cpt Luther Martin (k), Lt John Schoonover (w), Cpt William H. Lloyd (w), Cpt Samuel T. Sleeper, Lt John Schoonover; 26th Pennsylvania: Maj Robert L. Bodine (w); 84th Pennsylvania: Ltc Milton Opp
Second Division BG Andrew A. Humphreys	2nd Brigade Col William R. Brewster	70th New York: Col John E. Farnum; 71st New York: Col Henry L. Potter (w); 72nd New York: Col John S. Austin (w), Ltc John Leonard, Maj Caspar K. Abell; 73rd New York: Maj Michael W. Burns; 74th New York: Ltc Thomas Holt; 120th New York: Ltc Cornelius D. Westbrook (w, July 2), Maj John R. Tappen
Second Division BG Andrew A. Humphreys	3rd Brigade Col George C. Burling	2nd New Hampshire: Col Edward L. Bailey (w), Ltc James W. Carr (w); 5th New Jersey: Col William J. Sewell (w), Cpt Thomas C. Godfrey, Cpt Henry H. Woolsey (w); 6th New Jersey: Ltc Stephen R. Gilkyson; 7th New Jersey: Col Louis R. Francine (mw), Ltc Francis Price (w), Maj Frederick Cooper; 8th New Jersey: Col John Ramsey (w, July 2), Cpt John Langton; 115th Pennsylvania: Maj John P. Dunne
	Artillery Brigade Cpt George E. Randolph (w); Cpt A. Judson Clark	1st New Jersey Light, Battery B: Cpt A. Judson Clark, Lt Robert Sims; 1st New York Light, Battery D: Cpt George B. Winslow; New York Light, 4th Battery: Cpt James E. Smith; 1st Rhode Island Light, Battery E: Lt John K. Bucklyn (w), Lt Benjamin Freeborn (w); 4th United States, Battery K: Lt Francis W. Seeley (w, July 2), Lt Robert James

=== V Corps ===
MG George Sykes

General Headquarters:

- 12th New York Infantry (Companies D and E): Cpt Henry W. Ryder
- 17th Pennsylvania Cavalry, Companies D and H: Cpt William Thompson

Division	Brigade	Regiments and Others
First Division BG James Barnes (w)	1st Brigade Col William S. Tilton	18th Massachusetts: Col Joseph Hayes (w); 22nd Massachusetts: Ltc Thomas Sherwin, Jr.; 1st Michigan: Col Ira C. Abbott (w), Ltc William A. Throop (w); 118th Pennsylvania: Ltc James Gwyn, Maj Charles P. Herring
First Division BG James Barnes (w)	2nd Brigade Col Jacob B. Sweitzer	9th Massachusetts: Col Patrick R. Guiney; 32nd Massachusetts: Col George Lincoln Prescott (w), Ltc Luther Stephenson, Jr. (w), Maj James A. Cunningham; 4th Michigan: Col Harrison H. Jeffords (mw), Ltc George W. Lumbard; 62nd Pennsylvania: Ltc James C. Hull
First Division BG James Barnes (w)	3rd Brigade Col Strong Vincent (mw); Col James C. Rice	20th Maine: Col Joshua L. Chamberlain (w); 16th Michigan: Ltc Norval E. Welch; 44th New York: Col James C. Rice, Ltc Freeman Conner, Maj Edward B. Knox; 83rd Pennsylvania: Cpt Orpheus S. Woodward
Second Division BG Romeyn B. Ayres	1st Brigade Col Hannibal Day	3rd United States (Companies B, C, E, G, I and K): Cpt Henry W. Freedley (w), Cpt Richard G. Lay; 4th United States (Companies C, F, H and K): Cpt Julius W. Adams, Jr.; 6th United States (Companies D, F, G, H and I): Cpt Levi C. Bootes (w); 12th United States (Companies A, B, C, D and G, 1st Battalion and Companies A, C and D, 2nd Battalion): Cpt Thomas S. Dunn; 14th United States (Companies A, B, D, E, F and G, 1st Battalion and Companies F and G, 2nd Battalion): Maj Grotius R. Giddings
Second Division BG Romeyn B. Ayres	2nd Brigade Col Sidney Burbank	2nd United States (Companies B, C, F, H, I and K): Maj Arthur T. Lee (w), Cpt Samuel A. McKee; 7th United States (Companies A, B, E and I): Cpt David P. Hancock; 10th United States (Companies D, G and H): Cpt William Clinton; 11th United States (Companies B, C, D, E, F and G): Maj DeLancey Floyd-Jones; 17th United States (Companies A, C, D, G and H, 1st Battalion and Companies A and B, 2nd Battalion): Ltc James D. Greene
Second Division BG Romeyn B. Ayres	3rd Brigade BG Stephen H. Weed (k); Col Kenner Garrard	140th New York: Col Patrick O'Rorke (k), Ltc Louis Ernst, Maj Isaiah Force; 146th New York: Col Kenner Garrard, Ltc David T. Jenkins; 91st Pennsylvania: Ltc Joseph H. Sinex; 155th Pennsylvania: Ltc John H. Cain
Third Division BG Samuel W. Crawford	1st Brigade Col William McCandless	1st Pennsylvania Reserves (9 companies): Col William C. Talley (w); 2nd Pennsylvania Reserves: Ltc George A. Woodward; 6th Pennsylvania Reserves: Ltc Wellington H. Ent; 13th Pennsylvania Reserves: Col Charles F. Taylor (k), Ltc Alanson E. Niles (w) Maj William R. Hartshorne
Third Division BG Samuel W. Crawford	3rd Brigade Col Joseph W. Fisher	5th Pennsylvania Reserves: Ltc George Dare, Maj James H. Larrimer; 9th Pennsylvania Reserves: Ltc James M. Snodgrass; 10th Pennsylvania Reserves: Col Adoniram J. Warner (w), Ltc James B. Knox; 11th Pennsylvania Reserves: Col Samuel M. Jackson, Ltc Daniel Porter (w); 12th Pennsylvania Reserves (9 companies): Col Martin Davis Hardin
	Artillery Brigade Cpt Augustus P. Martin	Massachusetts Light, 3rd Battery: Lt Aaron F. Walcott; 1st New York Light, Battery C: Cpt Almont Barnes; 1st Ohio Light, Battery L: Cpt Frank C. Gibbs; 5th United States, Battery D: Lt Charles E. Hazlett (k), Lt Benjamin F. Rittenhouse; 5th United States, Battery I: Lt Malbone F. Watson (w), Lt Charles C. MacConnell

=== VI Corps ===
MG John Sedgwick

General Headquarters:

- 1st New Jersey Cavalry, Company L and 1st Pennsylvania Cavalry, Company H: Cpt William S. Craft

Division	Brigade	Regiments and Others
First Division BG Horatio G. Wright	1st Brigade BG Alfred T. A. Torbert	1st New Jersey: Ltc William Henry, Jr.; 2nd New Jersey: Ltc Charles Wiebecke; 3rd New Jersey: Col Henry W. Brown, Ltc Edward L. Campbell; 15th New Jersey: Col William H. Penrose
First Division BG Horatio G. Wright	2nd Brigade BG Joseph J. Bartlett; Col Emory Upton	5th Maine: Col Clark S. Edwards; 121st New York: Col Emory Upton; 95th Pennsylvania: Ltc Edward Carroll; 96th Pennsylvania: Maj William H. Lessig
First Division BG Horatio G. Wright	3rd Brigade BG David A. Russell	6th Maine: Col Hiram Burnham; 49th Pennsylvania (4 companies): Ltc Thomas M. Hulings; 119th Pennsylvania: Col Peter C. Ellmaker; 5th Wisconsin: Col Thomas S. Allen
First Division BG Horatio G. Wright	Provost Guard	4th New Jersey (3 companies): Cpt William R. Maxwell
Second Division BG Albion P. Howe	2nd Brigade Col Lewis A. Grant	2nd Vermont: Col James H. Walbridge; 3rd Vermont: Col Thomas O. Seaver; 4th Vermont: Col Charles B. Stoughton; 5th Vermont: Ltc John R. Lewis; 6th Vermont: Col Elisha L. Barney
Second Division BG Albion P. Howe	3rd Brigade BG Thomas H. Neill	7th Maine (6 companies): Ltc Seldon Connor; 33rd New York (detachment): Cpt Henry J. Gifford; 43rd New York: Ltc John Wilson; 49th New York: Col Daniel D. Bidwell; 77th New York: Ltc Winsor B. French; 61st Pennsylvania: Ltc George F. Smith
Third Division MG John Newton; BG Frank Wheaton	1st Brigade BG Alexander Shaler	65th New York: Col Joseph E. Hamblin; 67th New York: Col Nelson Cross; 122nd New York: Col Silas Titus; 23rd Pennsylvania: Ltc John F. Glenn; 82nd Pennsylvania: Col Isaac C. Bassett
Third Division MG John Newton; BG Frank Wheaton	2nd Brigade Col Henry L. Eustis	7th Massachusetts: Ltc Franklin P. Harlow; 10th Massachusetts: Ltc Joseph B. Parsons; 37th Massachusetts: Col Oliver Edwards; 2nd Rhode Island: Col Horatio Rogers, Jr.
Third Division MG John Newton; BG Frank Wheaton	3rd Brigade BG Frank Wheaton; Col David J. Nevin	62nd New York: Col David J. Nevin, Ltc Theodore B. Hamilton; 93rd Pennsylvania: Maj John I. Nevin; 98th Pennsylvania: Maj John B. Kohler; 139th Pennsylvania: Col Frederick H. Collier (w), Ltc William H. Moody
	Artillery Brigade Col Charles H. Tompkins	Massachusetts Light, 1st Battery (A): Cpt William H. McCartney; New York Light, 1st Battery: Cpt Andrew Cowan; New York Light, 3rd Battery: Cpt William A. Harn; 1st Rhode Island Light, Battery C: Cpt Richard Waterman; 1st Rhode Island Light, Battery G: Cpt George W. Adams; 2nd United States, Battery D: Lt Edward B. Williston; 2nd United States, Battery G: Lt John H. Butler; 5th United States, Battery F: Lt Leonard Martin

=== XI Corps ===
MG Oliver O. Howard
MG Carl Schurz

General Headquarters:

- 1st Indiana Cavalry, Companies I and K: Cpt Abram Sharra
- 8th New York Infantry (1 company): Lt Hermann Foerster

Division	Brigade	Regiments and Others
First Division BG Francis C. Barlow (w&c); BG Adelbert Ames	1st Brigade; Col Leopold von Gilsa	41st New York (9 companies): Ltc Detler von Einsiedel; 54th New York: Maj Stephen Kovacs (c), Lt Ernst Both; 68th New York: Col Gotthilf Bourry; 153rd Pennsylvania: Maj John F. Frueauff
First Division BG Francis C. Barlow (w&c); BG Adelbert Ames	2nd Brigade BG Adelbert Ames; Col Andrew L. Harris	17th Connecticut: Ltc Douglas Fowler (k July 1), Maj Allen G. Brady (w July 2); 25th Ohio: Ltc Jeremiah Williams (c), Cpt Nathaniel J. Manning (w), Lt William Maloney (w), Lt Israel White; 75th Ohio: Col Andrew L. Harris, Cpt George B. Fox; 107th Ohio: Col Seraphim Meyer (w), Cpt John M. Lutz
Second Division BG Adolph von Steinwehr	1st Brigade Col Charles R. Coster	134th New York: Ltc Allan H. Jackson (c), Maj George W. B. Seeley; 154th New York: Ltc Daniel B. Allen, Maj Lewis D. Warner; 27th Pennsylvania: Ltc Lorenz Cantador; 73rd Pennsylvania: Cpt Daniel F. Kelley
Second Division BG Adolph von Steinwehr	2nd Brigade Col Orland Smith	33rd Massachusetts: Col Adin B. Underwood; 136th New York: Col James Wood; 55th Ohio: Col Charles B. Gambee; 73rd Ohio: Ltc Richard Long
Third Division MG Carl Schurz; BG Alexander Schimmelfennig; MG Carl Schurz	1st Brigade BG Alexander Schimmelfennig; Col George von Amsberg	82nd Illinois: Ltc Edward S. Salomon; 45th New York: Col George von Amsberg, Ltc Adolphus Dobke (w); 157th New York: Col Philip P. Brown, Jr. (w), Ltc George Arrowsmith (k); 61st Ohio: Col Stephen J. McGroarty, Ltc William H. H. Brown; 74th Pennsylvania: Col Adolph von Hartung (w), Ltc Alexander von Mitzel (c), Cpt Henry Krauseneck
Third Division MG Carl Schurz; BG Alexander Schimmelfennig; MG Carl Schurz	2nd Brigade Col Wladimir Krzyzanowski	58th New York: Ltc August Otto (w), Cpt Emil Koenig; 119th New York: Col John T. Lockman (w), Ltc Edward F. Lloyd; 82nd Ohio: Col James S. Robinson (w), Ltc David Thomson; 75th Pennsylvania: Col Francis Mahler (mw), Maj August Ledig; 26th Wisconsin: Ltc Hans Boebel (w), Maj Henry Baetz (w), Cpt John W. Fuchs
	Artillery Brigade Maj Thomas W. Osborn	1st New York Light, Battery I: Cpt Michael Wiedrich; New York Light, 13th Battery: Lt William Wheeler; 1st Ohio Light, Battery I: Cpt Hubert Dilger; 1st Ohio Light, Battery K: Cpt Lewis Heckman; 4th United States, Battery G: Lt Bayard Wilkeson (mw), Lt Eugene A. Bancroft

=== XII Corps ===
MG Henry W. Slocum
BG Alpheus S. Williams

Provost Guard:

- 10th Maine Battalion (3 companies): Cpt John D. Beardsley

Division	Brigade	Regiments and Others
First Division BG Alpheus S. Williams; BG Thomas H. Ruger	1st Brigade Col Archibald L. McDougall	5th Connecticut: Col Warren W. Packer; 20th Connecticut: Ltc William B. Wooster, Maj Philo B. Buckingham; 3rd Maryland: Col Joseph M. Sudsburg, Ltc Gilbert P. Robinson; 123rd New York: Ltc James C. Rogers, Cpt Adolphus H. Tanner; 145th New York: Col Edward L. Price; 46th Pennsylvania: Col James L. Selfridge
First Division BG Alpheus S. Williams; BG Thomas H. Ruger	3rd Brigade BG Thomas H. Ruger; Col Silas Colgrove	27th Indiana: Col Silas Colgrove, Ltc John R. Fesler, Maj Theodore F. Colgrove; 2nd Massachusetts: Ltc Charles R. Mudge (k), Maj Charles F. Morse; 13th New Jersey: Col Ezra A. Carman; 107th New York: Col Nirom M. Crane; 3rd Wisconsin: Col William Hawley, Ltc Martin Flood
Second Division BG John W. Geary	1st Brigade Col Charles Candy	5th Ohio: Col John H. Patrick; 7th Ohio: Col William R. Creighton, Ltc O. J. Crane; 29th Ohio: Cpt Wilbur F. Stevens (w), Cpt Edward Hayes; 66th Ohio: Ltc Eugene Powell, Maj Joshua G. Palmer (mw); 28th Pennsylvania: Cpt John H. Flynn (w); 147th Pennsylvania (8 companies): Ltc Ario Pardee, Jr., Maj George Harney
Second Division BG John W. Geary	2nd Brigade Col George A. Cobham, Jr. BG Thomas L. Kane	29th Pennsylvania: Col William Rickards, Jr., Ltc Samuel M. Zulick; 109th Pennsylvania: Cpt Frederick L. Gimber; 111th Pennsylvania: Ltc Thomas M. Walker
Second Division BG John W. Geary	3rd Brigade BG George S. Greene (w)	60th New York: Col Abel Godard, Ltc John C. O. Redington; 78th New York: Ltc Herbert von Hammerstein, Maj William H. Randall (w); 102nd New York: Col James C. Lane (w, July 2), Cpt Lewis R. Stegman; 137th New York: Col David Ireland, Ltc Koert S. Van Voorhees (w); 149th New York: Ltc Charles B. Randall (w)
Reporting directly	Lockwood's Brigade BG Henry H. Lockwood	1st Maryland, Potomac Home Brigade: Col William P. Maulsby; 1st Maryland, Eastern Shore: Col James Wallace; 150th New York: Col John H. Ketcham, Ltc Charles G. Bartlett, Maj Alfred Baker Smith
	Artillery Brigade Lt Edward D. Muhlenberg	1st New York Light, Battery M: Lt Charles E. Winegar; Pennsylvania Light, Battery E: Lt Charles A. Atwell; 4th United States, Battery F: Lt Sylvanus T. Rugg; 5th United States, Battery K: Lt David H. Kinzie

=== Cavalry Corps ===
MG Alfred Pleasonton

Headquarter Guards:

- 1st Ohio Cavalry, Company A: Cpt Noah Jones (Second Division)
- 1st Ohio Cavalry, Company C: Cpt Samuel N. Stanford (Third Division)

Division	Brigade	Regiments and Others
First Division BG John Buford	1st Brigade Col William Gamble	3rd Indiana Cavalry (6 companies): Col George H. Chapman; 8th Illinois Cavalry: Maj John L. Beveridge; 8th New York Cavalry: Ltc William L. Markell; 12th Illinois Cavalry (4 companies): Maj Charles Lemmon (mw)
First Division BG John Buford	2nd Brigade Col Thomas Devin	6th New York Cavalry (6 companies): Maj William E. Beardsley; 9th New York Cavalry: Col William Sackett; 17th Pennsylvania Cavalry: Col Josiah H. Kellogg; 3rd West Virginia Cavalry, Companies A and C: Cpt Seymour B. Conger
First Division BG John Buford	Reserve Brigade BG Wesley Merritt	6th Pennsylvania Cavalry: Maj James H. Haseltine; 1st United States Cavalry: Cpt Richard S. C. Lord; 2nd United States Cavalry: Cpt Theophilus F. Rodenbough; 5th United States Cavalry: Cpt Julius W. Mason; 6th United States Cavalry: Maj Samuel H. Starr (w), Lt Louis H. Carpenter, Lt Nicholas M. Nolan, Cpt Ira W. Claflin (w)
Second Division BG David McMurtrie Gregg	1st Brigade Col John B. McIntosh	1st Maryland Cavalry (11 companies): Ltc James M. Deems; Purnell (Maryland) Cavalry Legion, Company A: Cpt Robert E. Duvall; 1st Massachusetts Cavalry: Ltc Greely S. Curtis; 1st New Jersey Cavalry: Maj Myron H. Beaumont; 1st Pennsylvania Cavalry: Col John P. Taylor; 3rd Pennsylvania Cavalry: Ltc Edward S. Jones; 3rd Pennsylvania Heavy Artillery, Section, Battery H: Cpt William D. Rank
Second Division BG David McMurtrie Gregg	3rd Brigade Col John Irvin Gregg	1st Maine Cavalry (10 companies): Ltc Charles H. Smith; 10th New York Cavalry: Maj Mathew Henry Avery; 4th Pennsylvania Cavalry: Ltc William E. Doster; 16th Pennsylvania Cavalry: Ltc John K. Robison
Third Division BG Judson Kilpatrick	1st Brigade BG Elon J. Farnsworth (k); Col Nathaniel P. Richmond	5th New York Cavalry: Maj John Hammond; 18th Pennsylvania Cavalry: Ltc William P. Brinton; 1st Vermont Cavalry: Col Addison W. Preston; 1st West Virginia Cavalry (10 companies): Col Nathaniel P. Richmond, Maj Charles E. Capehart
Third Division BG Judson Kilpatrick	2nd Brigade BG George A. Custer	1st Michigan Cavalry: Col Charles H. Town, Ltc Peter Stagg (w); 5th Michigan Cavalry: Col Russell A. Alger, Ltc Ebenezer Gould (w), Maj Noah H. Ferry (k); 6th Michigan Cavalry: Col George Gray; 7th Michigan Cavalry: (10 companies): Col William D. Mann
Horse Artillery	1st Brigade Cpt James M. Robertson	9th Michigan Battery: Cpt Jabez J. Daniels; 6th New York Battery: Cpt Joseph W. Martin; 2nd United States, Batteries B and L: Lt Edward Heaton; 2nd United States, Battery M: Lt Alexander C. M. Pennington, Jr.; 4th United States, Battery E: Lt Samuel S. Elder
Horse Artillery	2nd Brigade Cpt John C. Tidball	1st United States, Batteries E and G: Cpt Alanson M. Randol; 1st United States, Battery K: Cpt William M. Graham, Jr.; 2nd United States, Battery A: Lt John H. Calef

=== Artillery Reserve ===
BG Robert O. Tyler
Cpt James M. Robertson

Headquarter Guard:

- 32nd Massachusetts Infantry, Company C: Cpt Josiah C. Fuller

Brigade	Batteries
1st Regular Brigade Cpt Dunbar R. Ransom (w)	1st United States, Battery H: Lt Chandler P. Eakin (w), Lt Philip D. Mason; 3rd United States, Batteries F and K: Lt John G. Turnbull; 4th United States, Battery C: Lt Evan Thomas; 5th United States, Battery C: Lt Gulian V. Weir (w)
1st Volunteer Brigade Ltc Freeman McGilvery	Massachusetts Light, 5th Battery (E): Cpt Charles A. Phillips; Massachusetts Light, 9th Battery: Cpt John Bigelow (w), Lt Richard S. Milton; New York Light, 15th Battery: Cpt Patrick Hart (w), Lt Andrew R. McMahon; Pennsylvania Light, Battery C and Battery F: Cpt James Thompson (w)
2nd Volunteer Brigade Cpt Elijah D. Taft	1st Connecticut Heavy, Battery B: Cpt Albert F. Brooker; 1st Connecticut Heavy, Battery M: Cpt Franklin A. Pratt; Connecticut Light, 2nd Battery: Cpt John W. Sterling; New York Light, 5th Battery: Cpt Elijah D. Taft
3rd Volunteer Brigade Cpt James F. Huntington	New Hampshire Light, 1st Battery: Cpt Frederick M. Edgell; 1st Ohio Light, Battery H: Lt George W. Norton; 1st Pennsylvania Light, Batteries F and G: Cpt R. Bruce Ricketts; West Virginia Light, Battery C: Cpt Wallace Hill
4th Volunteer Brigade Cpt Robert H. Fitzhugh	Maine Light, 6th Battery (F): Lt Edwin B. Dow; Maryland Light, Battery A: Cpt James H. Rigby; New Jersey Light, 1st Battery: Lt Augustine N. Parsons; 1st New York Light, Battery G: Cpt Nelson Ames; 1st New York Light, Battery K: Cpt Robert H. Fitzhugh
Train Guard	4th New Jersey Infantry (7 companies): Maj Charles Ewing
