= Ira W. Claflin =

United States Army officer (1834–1867)

Ira Wallace Claflin
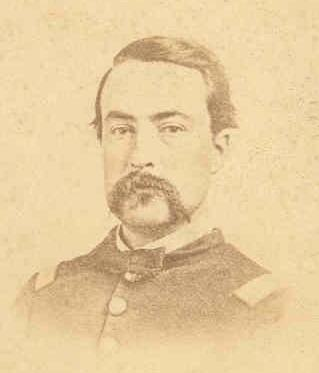
- Captain Ira W. Claflin
- Born: June 21, 1834; Rochester, Vermont
- Died: November 18, 1867 (aged 33); Mount Pleasant, Texas
- Burial place: Alexandria National Cemetery, Louisiana
- Military career
- Allegiance: United States of America
- Branch: United States Army
- Service years: 1857–1867
- Rank: Brevet Major
- Commands: 6th U.S. Cavalry Regiment
- Conflicts: American Civil War: 10 major campaigns (1861–1865)

Ira Wallace Claflin (June 21, 1834 – November 18, 1867) was a United States Army West Point regular officer who took command of the 6th US Cavalry during the critical days of July 1863 during the Gettysburg campaign. He was an instructor of Union cavalry tactics for West Virginia and later taught at West Point.

== Family ==
Ira Wallace Claflin was the eldest son, of eight children, of Ira Claflin, Sr (1808–1891) and Hannah Wells Richardson (1814–1907), born in Rochester, Vermont. Ira W. married Jane Cooper Stuck on April 21, 1863, at Hagerstown, Maryland. They had two children, Mary Cooper Claflin (1864–?) and a son, Morris Fairfax Claflin (1867–?). Claflin's father, Ira W. Claflin Sr., helped raise his two children and assisted his widow. They were noted as in Iowa in the 1870 United States Census.

== Military service ==
=== Pre-Civil War ===
Claflin was appointed from Iowa to the United States Military Academy at West Point in 1853. He graduated on July 1, 1857, 27th in his class. He was assigned to the Regiment of Mounted Riflemen as a second lieutenant. From October 3, 1857, to May 13, 1858, he served as an assistant instructor of cavalry. On June 14, 1858, Claflin reported to his regiment in Albuquerque, New Mexico, and served at Fort Union. He saw minor action against the Tuni-cha Navajos in 1859.

=== American Civil War ===
When the American Civil War started, Claflin received orders to report to the newly formed 3rd United States Cavalry that was created on May 14, 1861, but re-designated the 6th US Cavalry on August 3, 1861.

His reporting date was delayed probably due to the "needs of the service" because he is noted as serving with distinction, and with "gallant and meritorious services" at the Battle of Val Verde on February 21, 1862, earning a brevet promotion to captain. He is noted at the Battle of Glorieta Pass on March 18, 1862, commanding the artillery unit. He also fought at Peralta, New Mexico, on April 15, 1862, before joining the "Fighting 6th Regiment", then on the Peninsula campaign.

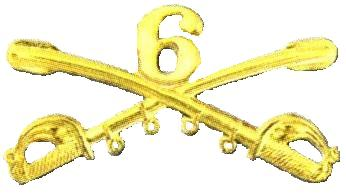
6th Regiment United States Cavalry insignia

=== Peninsula Campaign ===
Claflin, now a first lieutenant, had been trained as an infantry soldier who was capable of riding a horse to the battlefield and as a mounted scout. As a "horse soldier" or "mounted rifleman," Claflin had years of experience on the frontier serving as a regular. His job as a professional soldier from West Point was to set an example to his men and adapt to the different type of war in the east. The horse soldier needed to become cavalry, but this had a steep learning curve that proved difficult and frustrating during the first few years of the war. The 6th Cavalry had chased the audacious Jeb Stuart's Cavalry that went completely around the Union Army (June 13–15, 1862). This caused great psychological concerns to the Union cavalry commanders and men. The "horse soldiers" were a far second best compared to the dashing Confederate cavalry.

Rapid expansion of the Union Cavalry in the East was chaotic. At the beginning of the Civil War, officers were elected by the men or appointed politically. This resulted in many misguided and inept commanders. The tools and techniques of pre-war cavalry often seemed inadequate, resulting in a steep learning curve that was costly in men and supplies. Slowly out the chaos came the tactics and leaders who proved worthy of the challenge. Union "horse soldiers" became cavalry troopers under this tough regimen and proved adept, dismounted and mounted on horseback, with their carbines, pistols, sabers and confident under their battle-proven leaders. Claflin had a head start due to his frontier service and West Point service that helped the regiment adapt. He was at Yorktown from June to August 1862. But was noted at the Seven Days Battles (June 25 to July 1, 1862), then served as the regimental commissary officer from August 27 to September 5, 1862. He was assigned to several company commands starting in September where his focus was training, manning and supplying those companies to fight as cavalry. In April 1863, he was assigned to command Company H of the 6th, where he remained for the rest of his service, except for when he was a staff officer of the regiment.

==== Gettysburg Campaign ====
The Gettysburg campaign was a series of engagements before and after the Battle of Gettysburg. To better understand Claflin's role within the military organization, the following brief is provided. For more details, see Gettysburg Union order of battle.

- The Army of the Potomac was initially under Major General Joseph Hooker then under Major General George G. Meade on June 28, 1863.
- The Cavalry Corps was commanded by Major General Alfred Pleasonton, with divisions commanded by Brigadier Generals John Buford, David McM. Gregg, and H. Judson Kilpatrick.

Division	Brigade	Regiments and Others
First Division: BG John Buford (2,748)
First Division: BG John Buford (2,748)	Reserve Brigade: BG Wesley Merritt	6th Pennsylvania Cavalry: Maj James H. Haseltine; 1st US: Capt Richard S. C. Lord; 2nd US: Capt Theophilus F. Rodenbough; 5th US: Capt Julius W. Mason; 6th US: Maj Samuel H. Starr, Lt Louis H. Carpenter, Lt Nicholas Nolan, Capt Ira W. Claflin

The following list is the 6th US Cavalry Regiment's documented battles and engagements of June and July 1863 which Claflin participated. These battles were pivotal for Claflin as a company commander and as a regimental commissary until July 3. Then he assumed command of his regiment after that date. Lt. Louis H. Carpenter served as his executive officer.

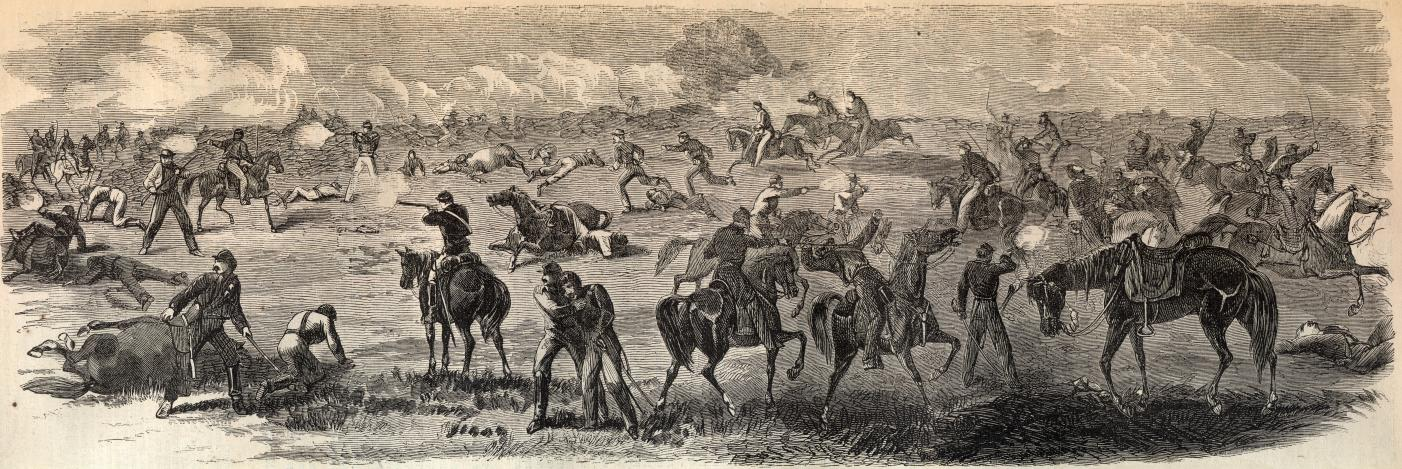
The Battle of Upperville: Harper's Weekly, issue date July 18, 1863.

- Beverly Ford, Virginia, June 9, at the Battle of Brandy Station. The 6th was under Buford's right wing.
- Benton's Mill, Virginia, June 17, an engagement near Middleburg.
- Middleburg, Virginia, June 21, at the Battle of Middleburg.
- Upperville, Virginia, June 21, at the Battle of Upperville.
- Fairfield, Pennsylvania, July 3, at the Battle of Fairfield.
- Williamsport, Maryland, July 6, an engagement.
- Funkstown, Maryland, July 7, a small engagement.
- Boonesboro, Maryland, July 8 and 9, at the Battle of Boonesboro.
- Funkstown, Maryland, July 10, at the Battle of Funkstown.

===== Battle of Brandy Station =====
On June 9, 1863, opposing cavalry forces met at Brandy Station, near Culpeper, Virginia. The 9,500 Confederate cavalrymen under Major General J.E.B. Stuart were surprised at dawn by Major General Alfred Pleasonton's combined arms force of two cavalry divisions of some 8,000 cavalry troops (including the 6th U.S. Cavalry Regiment with Claflin), and his assistant Carpenter, commanding Company H and some 3,000 infantry. Stuart barely repulsed the Union attack and required more time to reorganize and rearm. This inconclusive battle was the largest predominantly cavalry engagement of the Civil War to that time. This battle proved for the first time that the Union horse soldiers, like Claflin, were equal to their Southern counterparts.

===== Battle of Fairfield =====
On July 3, 1863, reports of a slow moving Confederate wagon train in the vicinity of Fairfield, Pennsylvania, attracted the attention of newly commissioned Union Brigadier General Wesley Merritt of the Reserve Brigade, First Division, Cavalry Corps. He ordered the 6th U.S. Cavalry under Major Samuel H. Starr to scout Fairfield and locate the wagons, resulting in the Battle of Fairfield. Claflin was at the Cavalry headquarters as the regimental commissary officer at that time. The following events would lead to his commanding of the regiment.

Major Starr, the regimental commander, on July 3, 1863, was east of Fairfield when he made contact with the enemy. Starr had his 400 troopers dismount in a field and an orchard on both sides of the road. Union troopers directed by their officers took up hasty defensive positions on this slight ridge. Under the command of Major Starr Carpenter with H troop Nolan on a flanking move with Company C and the others threw back a mounted charge of the 7th Virginia Cavalry, just as the Confederate Chew's Battery unlimbered and opened fire on the Federal cavalrymen. Supported by the 6th Virginia Cavalry, the 7th Virginia charged again, clearing Starr's force off the ridge and inflicting heavy losses. General "Grumble" Jones, outnumbering the Union forces by more than 2 to 1, pursued the retreating Federals for three miles to the Fairfield Gap, but was unable to eliminate his quarry. Major Starr, who was wounded in the first attack, was unable to escape and was captured. Small groups of the 6th Cavalry "... reformed several miles from the field of action by Lt. Louis H. Carpenter", harassed the Virginia troopers, giving the impression of the vanguard of a much larger force. Carpenter then became the acting executive officer of the regiment, with Captain Claflin as commanding officer.

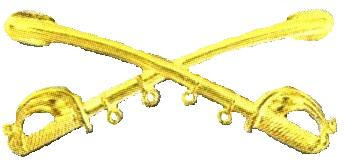
United States Cavalry branch insignia

The 6th Cavalry's stand at Fairfield stood against two of the crack brigades of Stuart's cavalry. was considered one of the most gallant in its history and helped influence the outcome the battles being fought around Gettysburg. While the 6th Cavalry regiment was cut to pieces, it fought so well that its squadrons were regarded as the advance of a large body of troops. The senior officer of those Confederate brigades was later criticized severely for being delayed by such an inferior force. Had the 6th Cavalry regiment not made their stand, the two brigades of Virginians could have caused serious problems to the Union rear areas. The decimated regiment of only about 200 troopers with only three officers was now commanded by Captain Claflin.

===== Funkstown, Maryland =====
On July 7, 1863 there was a small engagement at Funkstown, Maryland. Captain Claflin was seriously wounded in the shoulder and had to be carried off the field. He would not return to his regiment until September. Claflin was brevetted as a Major effective July 7, 1863 for "gallant and meritorious service during the Gettysburg Campaign. His executive officer, Louis H. Carpenter assumed temporary command until his return.

==== Overland Campaign ====
The Fighting 6th Regiment became an escort unit, under the command of Claflin, for Major General Philip Sheridan who was appointed to command the Cavalry Corps of the Army of the Potomac under the newly promoted general-in-chief Lieutenant General Ulysses S. Grant on April 5, 1864. Calfin's assistant, Carpenter, was semi-attached to Sheridan as a field & staff (F&S) officer to the Cavalry Corps. It is unknown how much of an influence Claflin and Carpenter had on Sheridan on the concept of deploying Union cavalry to become more effective and independent in roles such as long-range raids. Carpenter's treatise on "The Battle of Yellow Tavern" suggests that he had some influence on what was later called the Richmond or Sheridan's Raid.

On May 8, 1864, at the beginning of the Overland Campaign, Sheridan went over his immediate superior, Major General Meade's head and told Grant that if his Cavalry Corps were let loose to operate as an independent unit, he could defeat Confederate Major General J.E.B. Stuart. "Jeb" Stuart was the most prominent and able cavalry officer of the south. Grant was intrigued and convinced Meade of the value of Sheridan's request.

The May 1864 Battle of Yellow Tavern was the first of four major so called strategic raids. The others being the Trevilian in June 1864, the Wilson-Kautz in late June, and the First Deep Bottom in July 1864. Of all of these, only the Battle of Yellow Tavern can be considered a clear Union victory. The defeat and resulting death of "Jeb" Stuart made this clear during the first raid. At best, the follow-up raids diverted Confederate forces required to deal with them from where they were needed elsewhere. Despite what Carpenter and other supporters of Sheridan have written, further raids of this caliber were less than successful. And these raids may have even hindered the Union effort by the lack of reconnaissance and intelligence Sheridan could have otherwise provided.

On November 11, 1864, Brevett Major Claflin was appointed as a special instructor of cavalry to teach such cavalry tactics in the Department of West Virginia until July 21, 1865.

=== End of the Civil War ===
Through the course of the Civil War, Claflin served in at least 10 campaigns and over 100 battles related to them from the 1861 Peninsula Campaign, the 1862 Maryland Campaign, Campaign at Fredericksburg, the 1863 Gettysburg campaign and the Chancellorsville.

=== Post Civil War and death ===
Claflin served as an assistant instructor at West Point for geography, history and ethics until October 6, 1865. At his request, he was transferred to his regiment serving occupation duty in Texas.

In Austin, Texas, Captain Claflin, resuming his regular army rank, took command of H Troop. In June 1866 he took his troop on an inspection of frontier posts manned by his regiment and others. This took three months and covered almost 1,400 miles until he returned to Austin.

On January 20, 1866, Claflin and Troop H were sent to Mount Pleasant, Texas. During a yellow fever epidemic, Captain Claflin became ill and succumbed to the disease on November 18, 1867. He was only 33 years of age. He left a wife, Jane Cooper (Stuck) Claflin, and two children, a daughter, Mary Cooper Claflin, age 3 ½ years and a son, Morris Fairfax Claflin, age 6 months. Claflin's father, Ira W. Claflin Sr., helped raise his two children and assisted his widow. They were listed in Iowa in the 1870 United States Census.

Ira W. Claflin, Captain, US Army is buried in the Alexandria National Cemetery in Louisiana in section A, site 1003.

== Honors and awards ==
During his military career, Claflin received brevet promotions for bravery and was mentioned in dispatches several times during the Civil War both out west and in the east. Claflin received a series of brevet promotions for gallantry and or meritorious service and regular army promotions;

Major	Captain	First Lieutenant	2nd lieutenant (Note: Until December 1917, a U.S. Army 2nd lieutenant did not wear an insignia of rank. Ranks shown are modern representatives of U.S. Army officer ranks.)
O-4	O-3	O-2	O-1

(Note: During the American Civil War, the Union Army used brevet promotions. Soldiers and officers could be brevetted to fill officer positions as a reward for gallantry or meritorious service. Typically, the brevetted officer would be given the insignia of the brevetted rank, but not the pay or formal authority. It was not unheard of for an officer to have several different ranks simultaneously, such as being a brevet major general of volunteers, an actual brigadier general of volunteers, a brevet lieutenant colonel in the Regular Army, and an actual Regular Army rank of captain (e.g. Ranald S. Mackenzie). The practice of brevetting disappeared from the (regular) U.S. military at the end of the 19th century; instead, honors were bestowed with a series of medals. However, a similar practice of frocking continues in all five branches of the U.S. armed forces.)

A monument dedicated to the regulars of the United States Army who fought at Gettysburg includes Claflin.
United States Cavalry Reserve Brigade Brig. – General Wesley Merritt
1st. Regiment Captain Richard S.C. Lord Commanding
2nd. Regiment Captain Theophilus F. Rodenbough Commanding
5th. Regiment Captain Julius W. Mason Commanding
6th. Regiment Major Samuel H. Starr, Lieut. Louis H. Carpenter
Lieut. Nicholas Nolan, Captain Ira W. Claflin Commanding

== See also ==
- List of people from Vermont
