= Alexandria National Cemetery =

Alexandria National Cemetery is the name of two US National Cemeteries:

- Alexandria National Cemetery (Virginia)
- Alexandria National Cemetery (Louisiana)
