= Samuel H. Starr =

United States Army officer (1810–1891)

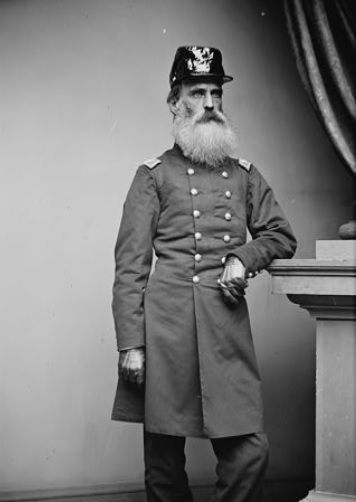
- Colonel Samuel H. Starr
- Born: July 31, 1810; Leyden, New York, US
- Died: November 23, 1891 (aged 81); Philadelphia, Pennsylvania, US
- Burial place: Arlington National Cemetery, Washington, District of Columbia
- Military career
- Allegiance: United States of America
- Branch: Department of War–Army
- Service years: 1832–1837; 1846–1870
- Rank: Colonel
- Nicknames: Paddy, Old-Paddy, Old Nose Bag
- Commands: 5th New Jersey Infantry; 3rd Brigade, Hooker’s Division, AoP; 6th U.S. Cavalry
- Conflicts: Mexican–American War: Battle of Tampico; Battle of Vera Cruz; Battle of Contreras; Battle of Molino del Rey; American Civil War: Battle of Williamsburg; Battle of Seven Pines; Gettysburg campaign (POW); Indian Wars

Samuel Henry Starr (July 31, 1810 – November 23, 1891) was a career United States Army officer, regimental commander and prisoner of war. A collection of his letters provide a rare view of military life, the War with Mexico, Indian conflicts, the Civil War, his fall from grace, recovery and post Civil War service. Despite his rough demeanor he was a religious man and reflective of the times he served.

He was known for his discipline and blistering tongue-lashings directed at friend and foe who performed unsuitably in his eyes. In the later part of 1862, he saber-slapped (hit with the flat edge of his saber) an inattentive camp guard and loudly declared the soldier an "SOB." Because of his "abuse of the guard," he resigned his rank of colonel, his command and subjected himself to a rigorous religious revival then an active recruiting effort.

Forgiven by the press and apparently by the Army, he rejoined the active military as a major in command of a cavalry regiment. He commanded the Cavalry Reserve Brigade briefly, but was denied the promotion and command when another officer his junior took command. He is noted for his July 1863 actions at the Battle of Fairfield where his small cavalry regiment took on two crack Confederate Cavalry Regiments reinforced with light artillery. He was severely wounded in the melee and his right arm had to be amputated while he was a prisoner of war. "Old Paddy" was exchanged on parole in September of that year.

After a period of recovery he resumed his career to command the Cavalry Remount Camp in Maryland. Later he was a Special Inspector of Cavalry for the armies of the Potomac and the James where his insistence of doing things right contributed to a higher degree of quality and professionalism. During the post war period he served in Texas then retired as a full colonel on December 15, 1870.

== Early years ==
Samuel Starr was born July 31, 1810, in Leyden, New York. He was the son of Benjamin John or Henry Starr (1779–1852) and Achsah Maria Ely (1787–1864). Samuel had eights siblings. Starr married Eliza Kurtz (1822–1900) from Philadelphia, Pennsylvania on July 21, 1841, in Leyden Township, Lewis County, New York and had several children.

- Achsah Catharine (Kate) Starr (about 1843–?) in New York state.
- Kurtz Henry Starr (1846–1847) in New York.
- Annie Martha Starr (about 1849–?) in Austin, Texas.
- Jo Ursula Starr (about 1851–?) in Fort Graham, Texas.
- Samuel Benjamin Starr (1857–?) in Burlington, New Jersey.

== Military service ==
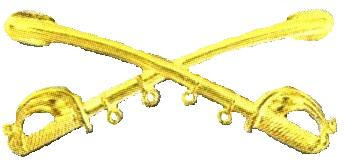
United States Cavalry branch insignia

Samuel Starr enlisted in the United States Army as a private on October 27, 1832, in Company G, 4th United States Artillery to October 26, 1837. On June 23, 1846, he enlisted with Company A, an engineer battalion during the Mexican War reaching the rank of sergeant and given a brevet promotion to second lieutenant on June 28, 1848, and he was discharged on July 13, 1848. He sent letters to his wife's home from Matamoros, Mexico in 1846. Other letters were sent from Victoria, Mexico dated January 12, 1847, and two from Tampico dated February 9 and 22, 1847. His nickname was "Paddy" reflective of his Irish ancestry.

In one letter dated March 14, 1847, from an engineer camp near the city of Veracruz, he mentions some skirmishing near San Juan. His letter of March 30, mentions the surrender of Veracruz to American forces. Another letter dated April 22, 1847, describes following Mexican General Santa Anna to Xalapa. The letter was written from the "Castle of Perote."

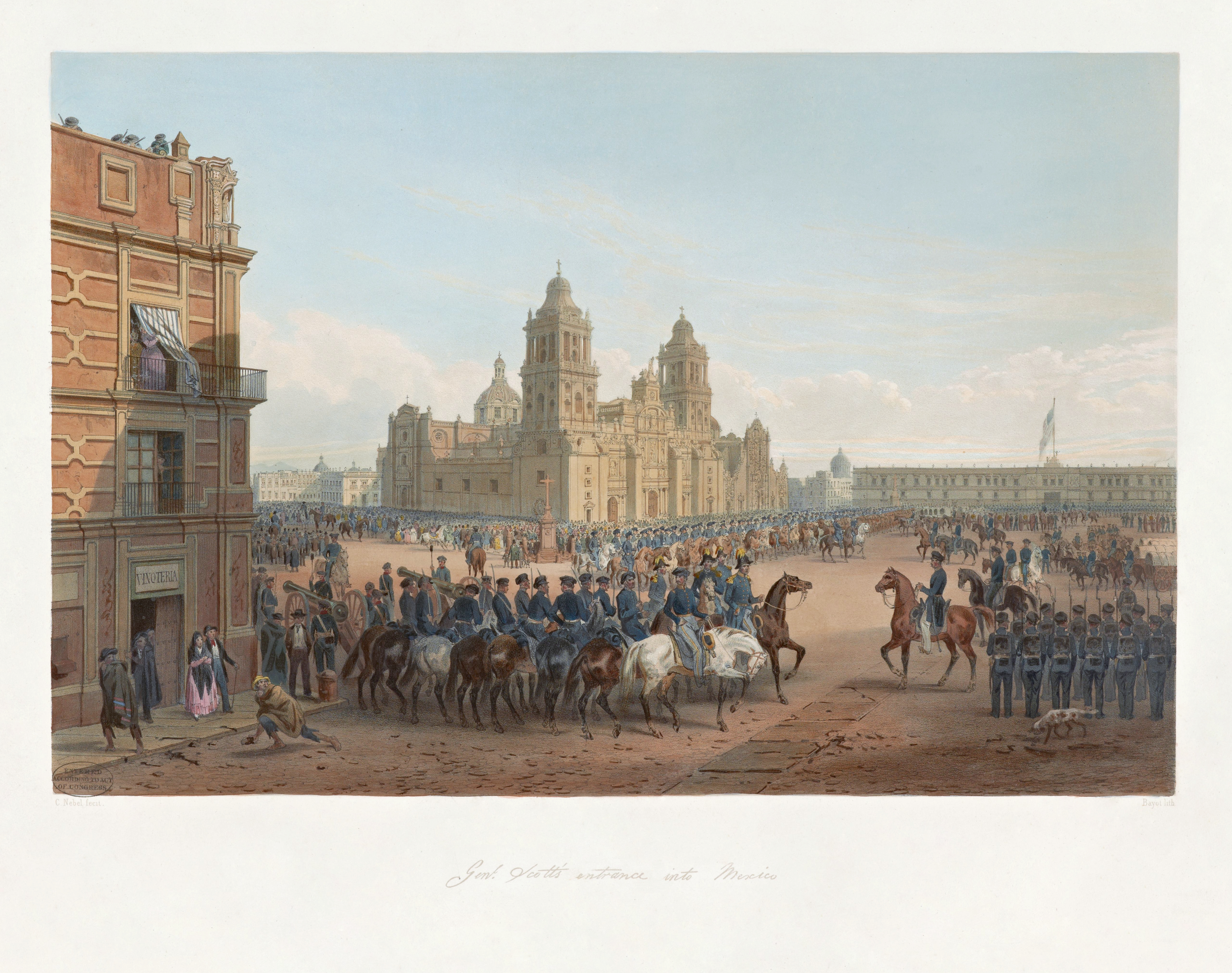
American soldiers and cavalry parade during the occupation of Mexico City

Other letters describe disease in the army (July 7), skirmishes during the approach to Mexico City and the Battle of Contreras (August 30). From the Halls of Montezuma (September 23) he provides a description of the Battle of Molino del Rey and the suffering of the casualties after that action. In many letters he paints a brief portrait of his life, the hardships of his men, the civilians and the defeated Mexican forces. In his last letter from "The City of Mexico" or Mexico City, his wife Eliza now resides in Rome, New York (May 8, 1848).

He was appointed brevet second lieutenant, 2nd Dragoons, in June 1848. On July 13, 1848, he is commissioned a second lieutenant in the Regular Army. He sends a letter to his wife from West Point, Texas, in Fayette County on June 25, 1848, where he mentions his promotion as a passing comment. From a camp at Towash Village (April 2, 1849), San Antonio May 20) he encourages his wife to consider coming to Texas. On November 10, 1851, he is promoted to first lieutenant. By January 18, 1852, his wife is at Fort Gates, Texas, while he is at Fort Mason.

Then there is a strange letter (August 2, 1853) that is regarding the limits of Starr's arrest from Thomas J. Wood at Fort Mason, Texas. This is frustrating because it provides no clue to why he is on house arrest! The July 31 letter it refers to was not copied for the author. Several letters are then exchanged including a tender letter to his daughter Kate on September 22, 1853, and no mention of his "arrest."

On March 4, 1854, he is at Fort McKavitt where he describes the needs of his wife for family to his daughter Kate. Starr served in Texas from 1848 to 1854 and this time was hard for his wife.

In 1855 he was in Fort Riley, Kansas. On July 20, 1855, he is at Fort Kearney, Nebraska Territory while his wife is in Burlington, New Jersey and the envelope indicates he is now a captain. He talks about his participation in chasing Native Americans on the plains and their way of life. Other letters mention the Sioux and Utah expeditions in 1855–1856 when he was at Fort Leavenworth, Kansas. Over the years he writes many letters home, mostly to his daughters.

On May 19, 1856, while at Old Fort Cedar, Captain Augustus Pleasonton writes from the headquarters of the Sioux Expedition at Fort Pierre orders to return to Pittsburgh, Pennsylvania for recruiting duty. Starr is there by July 17 and in a letter dated April 11, 1857, from the assistant adjutant general, L. Thomas, he is sent back West. In a June 26, 1857, letter he describes to his daughter Kate where he is and how things are going at the post.

Then there is a letter (September 13, 1857) regarding an investigation into Starr's conduct to the Inspector General, Colonel J. K. F. Mansfield regarding irregularities of recruiting accounts. There is a series of letters to and from the Auditor's Office in the Treasury Department until at least August 1859. Apparently this is resolved because he is promoted to captain on June 14, 1858, and continues with the 2nd U.S. Cavalry until August 3, 1861. In 1861 he leaves the Western territories for the East. On May 16, he is in Washington, D.C., and his wife is now residing in Burlington, New Jersey.

== Civil War ==
During the Civil War, Starr held a number of positions. He served as aide de camp to Brigadier General Joseph Mansfield, who was in command of the Department of Washington. On August 16, 1861, Starr accepts his appointment as a colonel of the 5th New Jersey Volunteer Infantry from Governor C. S. Olden in Trenton, New Jersey. It is effective on August 24, 1861. On September 25, 1861, the Officers of the 5th New Jersey Infantry write to Brigadier General William R. Montgomery regarding of Starr's excess discipline and mistreatment of his men.

By December 14, 1861, he was commander of the 3rd Brigade, Hooker’s Division, Army of the Potomac. His October 15 letter from Alexandria, Virginia to Eliza shows pride in his men. On May 4, 1862, he is breveted to major, Regular Army for gallant and meritorious service during the battle of Williamsburg, Virginia. He still held his volunteer rank of colonel.

He writes a letter to wife Eliza only 22 miles from the Confederate Capital in Richmond, Virginia, on May 17, 1862. He provides a good description and some detail of his experiences during the Battle of Williamsburg. On May 27 he writes from Bottom's Bridge in Virginia.

From the camp of "Seven Pines," six miles before Richmond, Virginia comes a report (June 5, 1862) of the killed and wounded from the 5th New Jersey Infantry during the Battle of Seven Pines in Virginia acknowledged by Colonel Starr. Then there is a printed commendation from George McClellan to the soldiers of the Army of the Potomac in a letter dated July 1, from Governor Olden in Trenton to Starr praising his men. "The regiment was brave, and I have reason to congratulate myself in having command of as gallant a regiment as any in the service."

=== Fall from grace and redemption ===
Starr had always been a strict taskmaster and disciplinarian typical of a pre-war army sergeant with a mouth that matched. To those who admired him, he earned the nickname of "Old Paddy" and to those that didn't "Old Nose Bag." The latter term comes from an old company punishment for transgression that required the offender mount astride a fence rail, with his arms secured behind him and with his feet tied together. The crowning came with a horse feed bag (the nose bag) placed over the face of the individual. Other forms of company punishment included being strapped to a wagon wheel or being forced to walk a post for hours in full uniform and gear. The harsh discipline was maintained for both officers and enlisted men. Starr had been warned after the September 25, 1861, letter of complaint from his officers. The volunteers would not put up with the harsh discipline of the pre-war regulars.

Due to a slapping incident, reticent of the future strict disciplinarian and vulgar lashing tongue of General George S. Patton, where Starr "saber slapped" an inattentive guard on the head, Starr resigned his commission in the volunteer service. A letter dated October 4, 1862, was forwarded General L. Thomas, Adjutant General in Washington, D.C., which was accepted on October 20. Starr at Camp Kearney, Virginia sends a telegram to Governor C. S. Olden regarding his resignation on October 22 and in reply Starr is encouraged to participate in recruiting efforts.

In a letter dated January 16, 1863, he shows remorse for his actions and a desire for forgiveness to his wife. On February 20, 1863, Starr writes to General L. Thomas, Adjutant General in Washington, D.C., regarding charges against him for improper recruiting. After a period of remorse and religious inner-inspection he returned to the 2nd U.S. Cavalry (formerly the 2nd Dragoons) as a captain. On April 25, 1863, Starr is promoted to major, Regular Army, with the 6th U.S. Cavalry Regiment.

He was breveted lieutenant colonel for gallant and meritorious service in action at Upperville, Virginia on June 21, 1863. Starr commanded the Cavalry Reserve Brigade briefly. He assumed he would be promoted, but his older age and reputation denied him continued command. Many felt his old school discipline, attitude and the rapidly changing venue of the Union cavalry was beyond him. Remarkably he held his tongue while fuming in outrage but soldiered on. Then for gallant and meritorious service in the Gettysburg Campaign he was breveted to colonel. However his new commander quickly makes a mistake that would be costly to Starr and the 6th Cavalry.

=== Gettysburg Campaign ===
The Gettysburg Campaign was a series of engagements before and after the Battle of Gettysburg. To better understand Starr's role within the military organization, the following brief is provided. For more details, see Gettysburg Union order of battle.

- The Army of the Potomac was initially under Major General Joseph Hooker then under Major General George G. Meade on June 28, 1863.
- The Cavalry Corps was commanded by Major General Alfred Pleasonton, with divisions commanded by Brigadier Generals John Buford, David McM. Gregg, and H. Judson Kilpatrick.

Division	Brigade	Regiments and Others
First Division: BG John Buford (2,748)
First Division: BG John Buford (2,748)	Reserve Brigade: BG Wesley Merritt	6th Pennsylvania Cavalry: Maj James H. Haseltine; 1st US: Capt Richard S. C. Lord; 2nd US: Capt Theophilus F. Rodenbough; 5th US: Capt Julius W. Mason; 6th US: Maj Samuel H. Starr, Lt Louis H. Carpenter, Lt Nicholas Nolan, Capt Ira W. Claflin

The following list is the 6th US Cavalry Regiment's documented battles and engagements of June and July 1863.

- Beverly Ford, Virginia, June 9, at the Battle of Brandy Station. The 6th was under Buford's right wing.

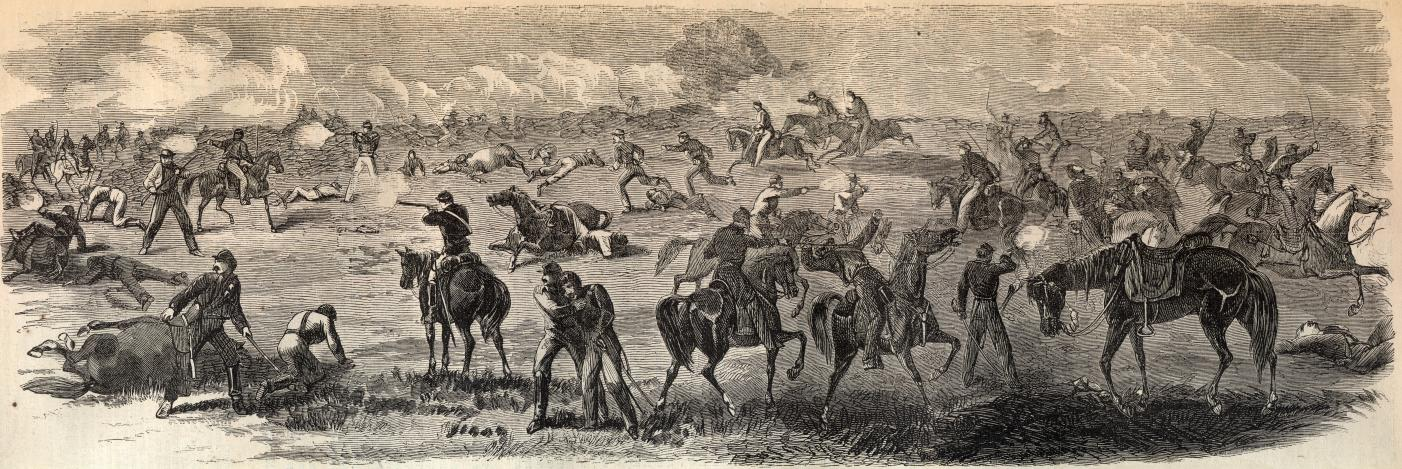
The Battle of Upperville: Harper's Weekly, issue date July 18, 1863.

- Benton's Mill, Virginia, June 17, an engagement near Middleburg.
- Middleburg, Virginia, June 21, at the Battle of Middleburg.
- Upperville, Virginia, June 21, at the Battle of Upperville
- Fairfield, Pennsylvania, July 3, at the Battle of Fairfield – This is where Starr was wounded and taken prisoner.
- Williamsport, Maryland, July 6, an engagement.
- Funkstown, Maryland, July 7, a small engagement.
- Boonesboro, Maryland, July 8 and 9, at the Battle of Boonsboro.
- Funkstown, Maryland, July 10, at the Battle of Funkstown.

=== Battle of Fairfield ===
On July 3, 1863, reports of a slow moving Confederate wagon train were reported in the vicinity of Fairfield, Pennsylvania, and attracted the attention of newly commissioned Union Brigadier General Wesley Merritt of the Reserve Brigade, First Division, Cavalry Corps. He ordered the 6th U.S. Cavalry under (Brevet Colonel) Major Starr to scout Fairfield and locate the wagons, resulting in the Battle of Fairfield. Starr dashed forward under orders after the Confederate supply train. His scouts spotted the wagons and Starr charged forward. When his forward units under Lieutenant Christian Balder encountered Virginia cavalry and came racing back, Starr decided to fight. He deployed his men in a defensive posture with a portion of them mounted ready for offensive action on the road.

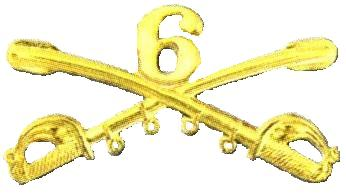
6th Regiment United States Cavalry insignia

Unknown to Starr his small cavalry regiment was facing two crack Confederate Cavalry Regiments reinforced with light artillery. Starr had his 400 troopers dismount perpendicular to the road in the adjoining fields and an orchard on a slight ridge near Fairfield, Pennsylvania. Union troopers directed by their officers took up hasty defensive positions along a fence and a row of trees.

Starr's 6th Regiment halted a charge of the 7th Virginia Cavalry. Starr, probably believing the Confederates were retreating charged forward with his mounted troopers. Confederate Chew's Battery unlimbered and opened fire on the Federal cavalrymen. The 7th quickly regrouped and supported by the 6th Virginia Cavalry, the 7th Virginia charged again.

It was a cavalryman's worst nightmare of a roiling twisted fight with pistols and blades by an overwhelming mounted force. In the violent melee Starr was struck by a saber in the head then hit in the arm by a pistol ball. He fell from his horse severely wounded. The Virginia cavalry cleared Starr's forces off the ridge inflicting heavy casualties and taking many prisoners. The 6th Cavalry had 6 men listed as killed in action, 5 officers and 23 men wounded and 203 officers and men missing out of 400.

General "Grumble" Jones, outnumbering the Union forces by more than 2 to 1, pursued the retreating Federals for three miles to the Fairfield Gap, but was unable to eliminate his quarry. Small groups of the Starr's 6th Cavalry," ... reformed several miles from the field of action by Lt. Louis H. Carpenter," harassed the Virginia troopers giving the impression of the vanguard of a much larger force. Another of Starr's lieutenants, named Nolan, though wounded, assisted with the wounded not captured.

The 6th Cavalry's stand was considered one of the most gallant in its history and helped influence the outcome the battles being fought around Gettysburg. While the 6th Cavalry regiment was cut to pieces, it fought so well that its squadrons were regarded as the advance of a large body of troops. The Confederate senior officer of those brigades was later criticized severely for being delayed by such an inferior force. Private George Crawford Platt, later Sergeant, an Irish immigrant serving in Carpenter's Troop H, was awarded the Medal of Honor on July 12, 1895, for his actions that day at Fairfield. His citation reads, "Seized the regimental flag upon the death of the standard bearer in a hand-to-hand fight and prevented it from falling into the hands of the enemy." His "commander" was an eyewitness and documented Private Platt's "beyond the call of duty" behavior that day. (Note: Bixby, William K. – Kodner, Molly Samuel H. Starr Papers, 1846–1904 In folder 72 in a letter dated January 9, 1868 is a copy of a letter from "George Stoneman, Petersburgh, Virginia, to Secretary of War, Washington, D.C., regarding actions of George C. Cram in the engagement at Fairfield, Pennsylvania, on July 3, 1863." Former Major Cram claimed credit for rallying the 6th Cavalry after the melee and the effort thereafter. Cram wished to be recognized for his actions. The Army dutifully conducted an investigation writing to those who survived the war. Starr reported that Cram "was not there."; Jones, Jim in 'Cross Sabers' reports a letter dated February 17, 1868 citing a letter from Major Samuel H. Starr, 6th Cavalry, from the "Post of Mount Pleasant, Tex." that it was Lt. Louis H. Carpenter who rallied the troops and that former Major Cram was not with the 6th for several days before the Battle of Fairfield." Cram's efforts for recognition and award were denied by the Army.; EHistory archive on page 8 has a listing of the primary officers present during the Gettysburg campaign. Under the Cavalry Corps, Reserve Brigade, 6th U.S. we find "Maj. Samuel H. Starr (wounded and exchanged), Lieut. Louis H. Carpenter, Lieutenant Nicholas Nolan, Captain Ira W. Claflin." We find no Major Cram.)

As a prisoner of war, Starr was taken into Fairfield by the Confederates. He had his wounds attended to and unfortunately his right arm had to be amputated. He spent a few days in Fairfield until he recovered enough to be transported south. "Old Paddy" was later exchanged in the following September (not November).

== Post P.O.W. service ==
On September 3, 1863, after returning home to Philadelphia, Starr wrote General Lorenzo Thomas, the U.S. Adjutant General, regarding his parole of honor and where he could be reached. On September 19, Starr received a letter from W. T. Hartz, Office of the Commissary General of Prisoners, informing him that his parole was invalid. By December 22, 1863, Starr was on light duty in Columbus, Ohio as a mustering officer. In September 1864 Starr was ordered to join Sheridan’s army in the Shenandoah Valley, arriving at Martinsburg, Virginia on October 19.

In November 1864, Starr was assigned as chief mustering and disbursing officer for the state of Ohio. He held this position until January 1865. On April 12, 1865, Starr wrote to the editor of the "Richmond Whig" and included the "proper lyrics" to a Union song.

Starr then served as special inspector of cavalry for the Armies of the Potomac and the James from January to August 1865.

Starr was then reassigned back to the 6th Cavalry in Maryland. In October 1865, he received a brevet commission to lieutenant colonel in the regular army for his outstanding service. In the later part of October, he was ordered with his regiment to Texas where he took part in the occupation. The 6th was headquartered in Austin, Texas and he brought his family there. Samuel Starr's daughter Kate married William D. Price of Austin, Texas, in 1866. Price had served as a captain of the 1st Texas Cavalry Regiment (Union) during the Civil War. Following the war, he became a prominent lawyer and judge in Austin. Price died in 1877.

Starr and the 6th participated in various Indian Campaigns from 1867 to 1869 in Texas. His daughter Jo apparently stayed in Philadelphia as evidenced by a series of letters from January 1866 to January 1870. He described various incidents and events he believed she would find interesting. His last letter in the Missouri Historical collection to his daughter Jo dated August 15, 1870, is reflective of his service. During this period of relative quiet, Colonel Starr retired from the army in December 1870.

== Retirement and legacy ==
Returning home to Philadelphia, he participated in the G.A.R. The Grand Army of the Republic was a fraternal organization composed of veterans of the Union Army who had served in the American Civil War. Apparently he was concerned about the loss of his arm and had made an insert for his uniform jacket. To the casual passerby, it appeared as if his arm and hand was present, but limp at his side. His 1870 retirement picture in Philadelphia reflects this. Colonel Samuel H. Starr, U.S.Army retired, died on November 23, 1891, in Philadelphia, Pennsylvania. He was buried at Arlington National Cemetery, Arlington, Virginia.

Samuel Starr left a legacy of many letters, correspondence, military papers regarding his service with various military units. This includes notes and comments from his daughters, especially Kate Price. They are part of the Samuel H. Starr Papers, 1846–1904 at the Missouri Historical Society Archives in St. Louis, Missouri.

The collection is arranged into eight series: Personal Correspondence from Samuel Starr to Family, Personal Correspondence to Samuel Starr (includes letters from veterans regarding reunions and veterans' organizations), Military Correspondence of Samuel Starr (Mexican War, the Civil War, and the Sioux Indian expedition), Military Papers of Samuel Starr (includes forms for quartermaster stores, charges against Starr, and lists of casualties. The series also includes three folders of General and Special Orders.), Papers of Other Members of the Starr Family, Papers of William D. Price, Papers of Other Members of the Price Family, and Miscellaneous.
