= Martin Schwenk =

American Civil War fighter and Medal of Honor recipient

Martin Schwenk (George Martin)
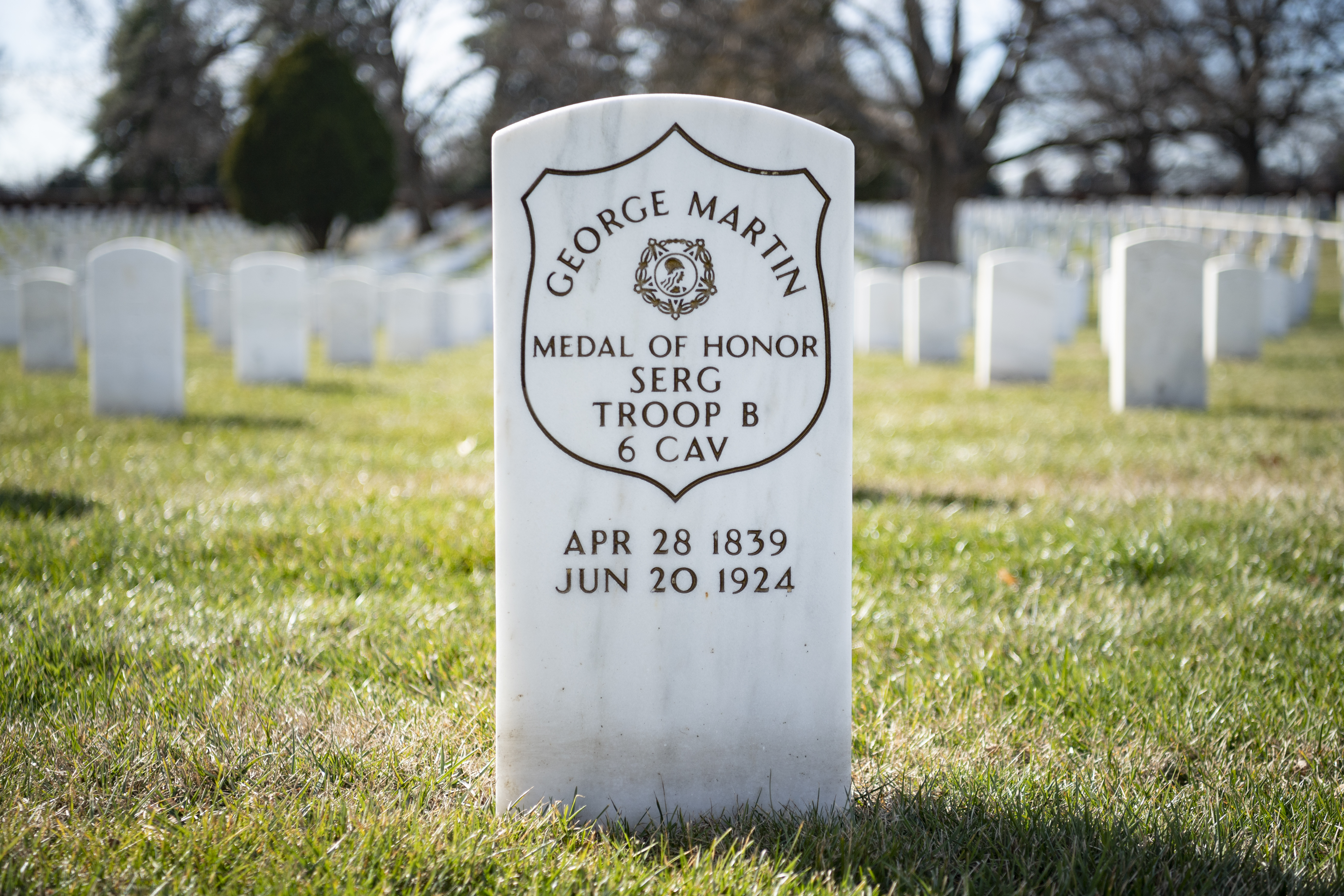
- Grave of George Martin at Arlington National Cemetery
- Born: April 28, 1839; Kingdom of Württemberg
- Died: June 20, 1924 (aged 85); Washington, D.C.CITEREFWashington_Star,_George_Martin_DeadJune_21,_1924
- Burial place: Arlington National Cemetery
- Military career
- Allegiance: United States of America
- Branch: United States Army
- Rank: Sergeant
- Units: (United States) Company B, 6th U.S. Cavalry Regiment
- Conflicts: American Civil War: Battle of Gettysburg
- Awards: Medal of Honor

Martin Schwenk (also known as George Martin, April 28, 1839 – June 20, 1924) was a German-American soldier who fought in the American Civil War. He received his country's highest award for bravery during combat, the Medal of Honor. The medal was awarded for bravery during the Battle of Gettysburg in Pennsylvania on 3 July 1863, in the Battle of Fairfield. He was honored with the award on April 23, 1889.

Schwenk was born in Baden in Germany. After emigrating to the United States, he entered service in Boston. He was buried at Arlington National Cemetery.

== Medal of Honor citation ==
The President of the United States of America, in the name of Congress, takes pleasure in presenting the Medal of Honor to Sergeant Martin Schwenk, United States Army, for extraordinary heroism on 3 July 1863, while serving with Company B, 6th U.S. Cavalry, in action at Millerstown (Gettysburg Battle), Pennsylvania, for bravery in an attempt to carry a communication through the enemy's lines. Sergeant Schwenk also rescued an officer from the hands of the enemy.

== Personal life ==
The Medal of Honor was presented to Martin Schwenk more than 25 years after his actions in the Battle of Fairfield under the command of Nicholas M. Nolan. His Medal of Honor file at the National Archives and Records Administration documents his efforts to credit the award to George Martin, his real name. His efforts were unsuccessful; War Department policy required that the citation be issued in the soldier's name as it appeared in department records at the time of service.

Martin had lived in Washington, D.C., for more than 50 years at the time of his death at Providence Hospital on June 20, 1924. His Medal of Honor recipient gravestone in Section 17 of Arlington National Cemetery reads George Martin.

== See also ==
- List of Medal of Honor recipients for the Battle of Gettysburg
- List of American Civil War Medal of Honor recipients: Q–S
