= Adrian R. Root =

American military officer (1832–1899)

- Born: May 6, 1832; Buffalo, New York
- Died: June 4, 1899 (aged 67); Buffalo, New York
- Burial place: Forest Lawn Cemetery, Buffalo, New York
- Military career
- Allegiance: United States of America
- Branch: United States Army; Union Army
- Service years: 1861–1865
- Rank: Colonel; Brevet Major General
- Unit: 21st New York Infantry Regiment
- Commands: 94th New York Infantry Regiment; 1st Brigade, 2nd Division, I Corps; Camp Parole
- Conflicts: American Civil War: Battle of Cedar Mountain; Second Battle of Bull Run; Battle of Fredericksburg; Battle of Chancellorsville; Battle of Gettysburg
- Other work: Warehouse executive, newspaper editor

Adrian Rowe Root (May 6, 1832 – June 4, 1899) was an American commission merchant, warehouse executive, newspaper editor and military officer in the Union Army during the American Civil War. He served as brigade commander for much of the war but his highest actual substantive grade was colonel. His March 2, 1865 nomination for appointment as brevet brigadier general of volunteers to rank from March 2, 1865, was confirmed by the United States Senate on March 9, 1865. His January 13, 1866 nomination for appointment as a brevet major general of volunteers, to rank from March 13, 1865, was confirmed by the U.S. Senate on March 12, 1866.

== Background ==
Adrian Root was born in Buffalo, New York, on May 6, 1832. Root was a commission merchant before the Civil War.

== American Civil War ==
Root enlisted in the Union Army at the beginning of the war and, on May 20, 1861, he was appointed lieutenant colonel of the 21st New York Volunteer Infantry, nicknamed the "1st Buffalo Regiment" because it was the first regiment mustered into the Union Army from Buffalo, New York. The 21st New York Infantry Regiment served in northern Virginia but engaged in no major actions during Root's service with that regiment.

On May 2, 1862, Root was commissioned colonel of the 94th New York Volunteer Infantry Regiment. Root fought with his regiment at the Battle of Cedar Mountain on August 9, 1862, and fought and was wounded at the Second Battle of Bull Run on August 30, 1862. On November 15, 1862, he returned to duty to command the 1st Brigade, 2nd Division, I Corps of the Army of the Potomac until May 11, 1863, when he resumed command of his regiment. As brigade commander, he commanded the brigade at the Battle of Fredericksburg and the Battle of Chancellorsville.

Root returned to command the brigade on July 1, 1863, the first day of the Battle of Gettysburg, after two other brigade commanders were wounded. Root also was soon wounded and captured. He was exchanged at Annapolis, Maryland, in 1864. Thereafter he was appointed commander of Camp Parole at Annapolis.

On March 2, 1865, President Abraham Lincoln nominated Root for appointment to the grade of brevet brigadier general of volunteers, to rank from March 2, 1865, and the United States Senate confirmed the appointment on March 9, 1865.

== Post–war ==
After the close of hostilities, from May 13, 1865, to June 23, 1865, Root commanded the 3rd Brigade, 3rd Division, V Corps of the Army of the Potomac. Root was mustered out of the U.S. volunteers on July 18, 1865.

On January 13, 1866, President Andrew Johnson nominated Root for appointment to the grade of brevet major general of volunteers, for faithful and meritorious service during the war, to rank from March 13, 1865, and the U. S. Senate confirmed the appointment on March 12, 1866.

After the war, Root was a warehouse executive and newspaper editor at Buffalo, New York. Adrian R. Root died at Buffalo, New York, on June 4, 1899. He is buried at Forest Lawn Cemetery, Buffalo, New York.
