= 5th New Jersey Infantry Regiment =

- Active: July 24, 1861, to May 1865
- Country: United States of America
- Allegiance: Union
- Branch: Union Army
- Type: Infantry
- Engagements: Siege of Yorktown (1862), Battle of Williamsburg, Battle of Fair Oaks & Darbytown Road, Battle of Seven Pines, Battle of Savage's Station, Battle of Glendale, Battle of Malvern Hill, Battle of Bristoe Station, Second Battle of Bull Run, Battle of Chantilly, Battle of Fredericksburg, Battle of Chancellorsville, Battle of Gettysburg, Battle of Manassas Gap, Battle of McLean's Ford, Battle of Mine Run, Battle of the Wilderness, Battle of Spotsylvania, Battle of North Anna, Battle of Totopotomoy Creek, Battle of Cold Harbor, Siege of Petersburg, First Battle of Deep Bottom, Battle of the Crater (mine explosion), Second Battle of Deep Bottom, Battle of Fort Sedgwick (Sept 10, 1864), Battle of Peebles' Farm, Battle of Boydton Plank Road

The 5th New Jersey Infantry Regiment was one of four regiments formed by Governor Charles Olden upon requisition of President Abraham Lincoln on July 24, 1861. The regiment departed for Washington, DC on August 24, 1861, and camped at Meridian Hill.

== History ==
The 5th New Jersey Infantry Regiment was ordered to Budd's Ferry in Charles County, Maryland, where they would join Brigadier General Joseph Hooker's Third Brigade and fall under the immediate command of Colonel Samuel H. Starr. The regiment would soon become part of the New Jersey Second Brigade and be commanded by Colonel William J. Sewell.

The 5th New Jersey Infantry Regiment lost 12 officers and 126 enlisted men killed and mortally wounded and 85 enlisted men to disease during the Civil War. It is honored by a monument at Gettysburg.
