= Alexandria National Cemetery (Louisiana) =

Historic veterans cemetery in Rapides Parish, Louisiana

- U.S. National Register of Historic Places
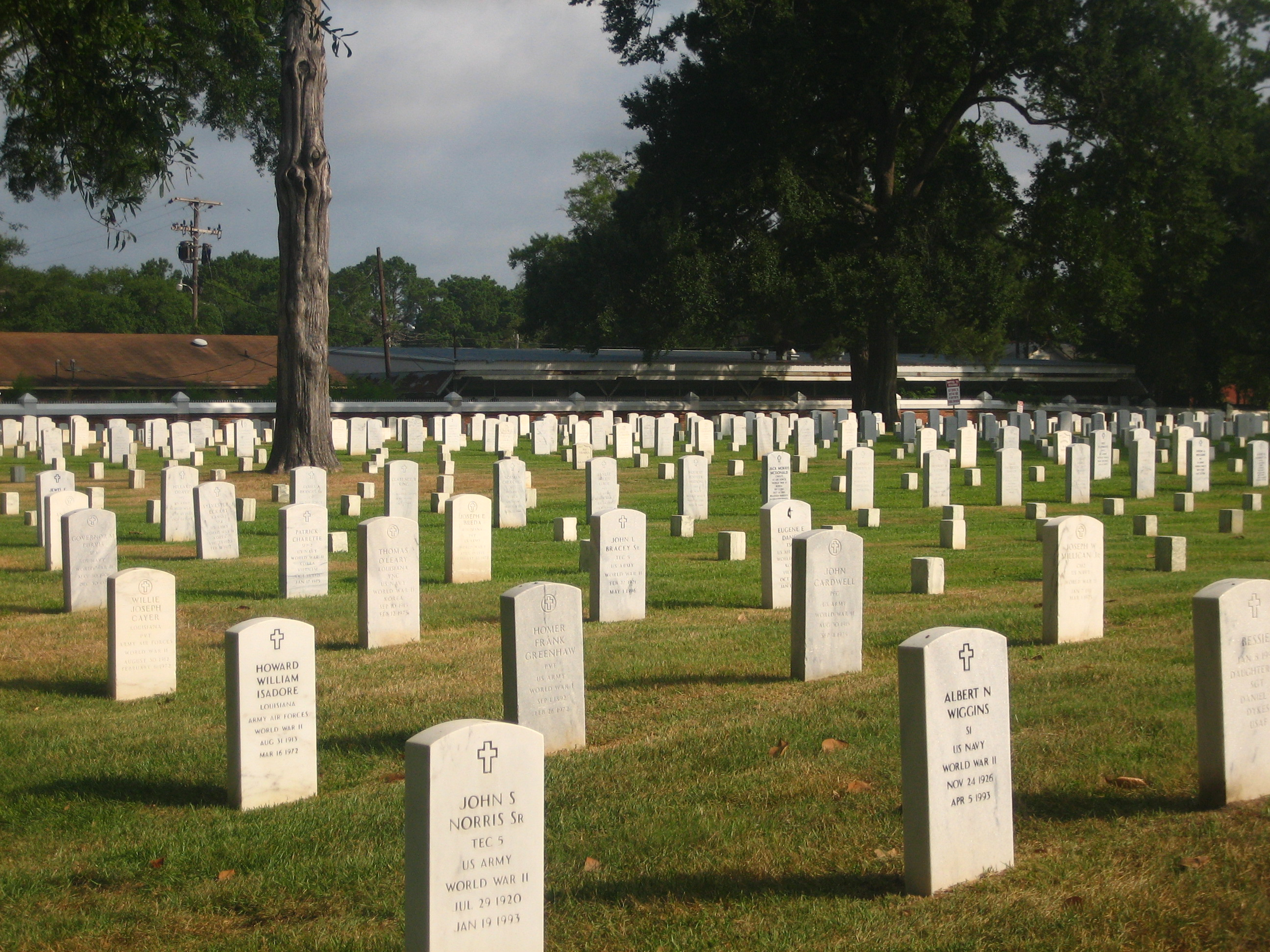

- Location within Louisiana Location within the United States
- Location: 209 Shamrock Ave., Pineville, Louisiana
- Coordinates: 31°19′21″N 92°25′56″W
- Area: 8.2 acres (3.3 ha)
- Built: 1867
- Architectural style: Colonial Revival
- MPS: Civil War Era National Cemeteries MPS
- NRHP reference No.: 97000767
- Added to NRHP: July 9, 1997

Alexandria National Cemetery is a United States National Cemetery located in the city of Pineville, in Rapides Parish, Louisiana. It occupies approximately 8 acres (3.2 ha), and is site to over 10,000 interments as of the end of 2020.

== New interments ==
The cemetery is closed to new interments. Exceptions to this include subsequent interments for veterans or eligible family members in an existing gravesite. Cemetery policy allows for first-come, first-served waitlist to eligible veterans if burial space becomes available due to a canceled reservation or when a disinterment has been completed.

== See also ==
- United States Department of Veterans Affairs
