= 13th New Hampshire Infantry Regiment =

- Active: September 20, 1862, to June 22, 1865
- Country: United States
- Allegiance: Union
- Branch: Infantry
- Engagements: Battle of Fredericksburg; Battle of Swift Creek; Battle of Drewry's Bluff; Bermuda Hundred Campaign; Battle of Cold Harbor; Siege of Petersburg; Second Battle of Petersburg; Battle of the Crater (reserve)* Battle of Chaffin's Farm; Battle of Fair Oaks & Darbytown Road

The 13th New Hampshire Infantry Regiment was an infantry regiment that served in the Union Army during the American Civil War. This regiment had the distinction of having the first U.S. flags in the city of Richmond, Virginia, on April 3, 1865.

== Service ==
The 13th New Hampshire Infantry was organized in Concord, New Hampshire, and mustered in for a three-year enlistment on September 20, 1862, under the command of Colonel Aaron Fletcher Stevens.

The regiment was attached to Casey's Division, Military District of Washington, to December 1862. 1st Brigade, 3rd Division, IX Corps, Army of the Potomac, to January 1863. 3rd Brigade, 3rd Division, IX Corps, to April 1863. 3rd Brigade, 2nd Division, VII Corps, Department of Virginia, to July 1863. 3rd Brigade, Getty's Division, United States forces, Norfolk and Portsmouth, Department of Virginia and North Carolina, to April 1864. 2nd Brigade, 1st Division, XVIII Corps, Army of the James, to July 1864. 1st Brigade, 1st Division, XVIII Corps, to December 1864. 1st Brigade, 3rd Division, XXIV Corps, Department of Virginia, to June 1865.

The 13th New Hampshire Infantry mustered out of service June 22, 1865. Veterans and recruits were transferred to the 2nd New Hampshire Infantry.

== Detailed service ==
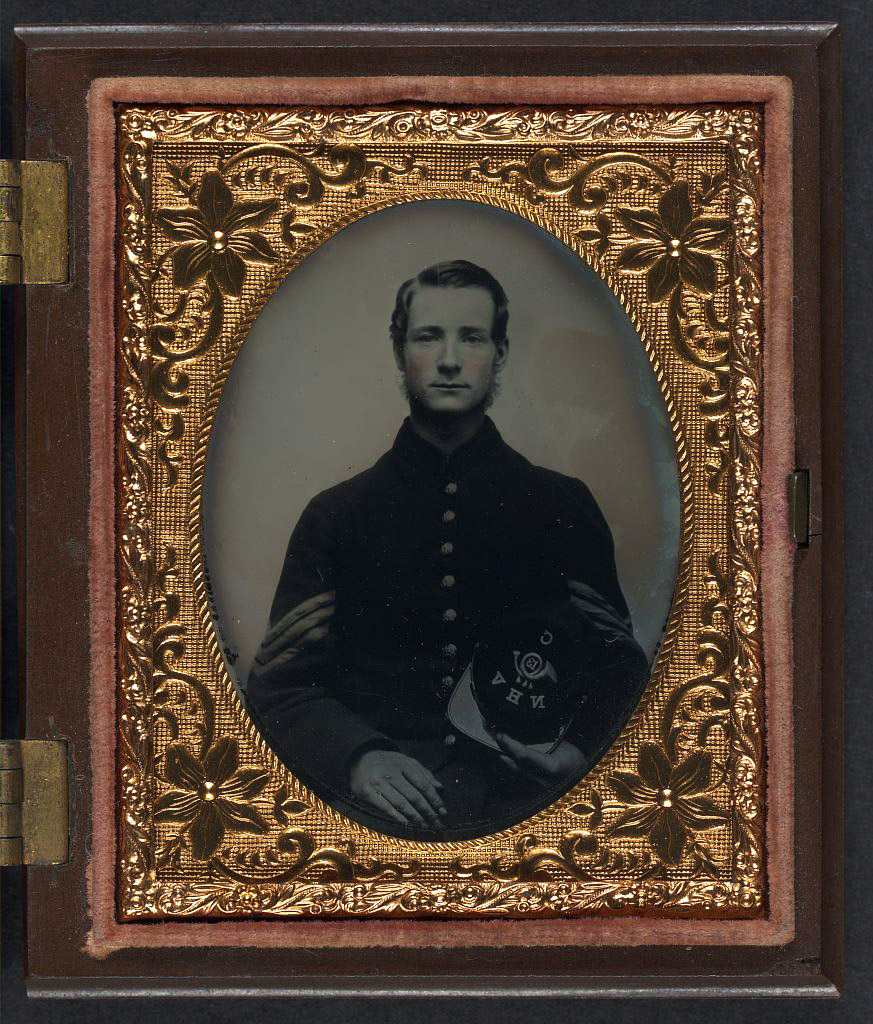
An unidentified sergeant with Company C of 13th New Hampshire

Left New Hampshire for Washington, D.C., October 5, 1862. Duty near Fort Albany, defenses of Washington, until December 4, 1862. March to Falmouth, Va., December 5–9. Battle of Fredericksburg December 12–15.

Burnside's Second Campaign "Mud March" January 20–24, 1863. Moved to Newport News, Va., February 9, then to Suffolk March 13. Siege of Suffolk April 12-May 4. Providence Church Road, Nansemond River, May 3. Reconnaissance across the Nansemond May 4. Moved to Portsmouth May 13, then to Yorktown. Dix's Peninsula Campaign June 24-July 7. Expedition from White House to South Anna River July 1–7. Moved to Portsmouth July 8–14; then to Julian Creek July 30, and duty there until March 19, 1864.

Moved to Yorktown March 19. Butler's operations on south side of James River and against Petersburg and Richmond May 4–28. Port Walthall Junction, Chester Station, May 6–7. Swift Creek (or Arrowfield Church) May 9–10. Operations against Fort Darling May 12–16. Battle of Drewry's Bluff May 14–16. Bermuda Hundred May 17–27. Moved to White House, then to Cold Harbor, May 27–31. Battles about Cold Harbor June 1–12. Before Petersburg June 15–19. Siege of Petersburg and Richmond June 16, 1864, to April 2, 1865. In trenches before Petersburg until August 27, 1864. Mine Explosion Petersburg July 30 (reserve). Duty on the Bermuda Front until September 26. Battle of Chaffin's Farm, New Market Heights, Fort Harrison, September 28–30. Assigned to duty as garrison at Fort Harrison. Battle of Fair Oaks October 27–28.

Duty in works before Richmond until April 1865. Occupation of Richmond April 3. Provost duty at Manchester until June. Mustered out June 22, 1865. Veterans and recruits transferred to 2nd New Hampshire.

== Casualties ==
The regiment lost a total of 181 men during service; 5 officers and 84 enlisted men killed or mortally wounded, 92 enlisted men died of disease.

== Commanders ==
- Colonel Aaron Fletcher Stevens
- Lieutenant Colonel George Bowers - resigned March 30, 1863
- Lieutenant Colonel Jacob J. Storer
- Major Nathan D Stoodley

== Notable members ==
- Colonel Aaron Fletcher Stevens - U.S. Representative from New Hampshire, 1867-1871

== See also ==
- List of New Hampshire Civil War units
- New Hampshire in the American Civil War
