= Boutwell =

Boutwell may refer to:

- Boutwell Creek, a stream in Minnesota
- USCGC Boutwell, two cutters operated by the United States Coast Guard
- USRC Boutwell (1873), a Revenue Cutter of the United States Revenue Cutter Service
- George S. Boutwell (1818–1905), American statesman
- John W. Boutwell (1845–1920), recipient of the Medal of Honor for valor
- Lo Boutwell (1892–1969), American football player
- Tommy Boutwell (born 1946), American football player
