= 10th New Hampshire Infantry Regiment =

- Active: September 4, 1862 – June 21, 1865
- Disbanded: June 21, 1865
- Country: United States
- Type: Infantry
- Size: Regiment
- Engagements: American Civil War: Battle of Fredericksburg; Battle of Swift Creek; Battle of Drewry's Bluff; Bermuda Hundred Campaign; Battle of Cold Harbor; Siege of Petersburg; Battle of Chaffin's Farm; Battle of Fair Oaks

Commanders
- Colonel: Michael Thomas Donohoe

The 10th New Hampshire Infantry Regiment was an infantry regiment that served in the Union Army during the American Civil War.

== Service ==
The 10th New Hampshire was organized in Manchester, New Hampshire, and mustered in for a three-year enlistment on September 4, 1862.

The regiment was attached to 1st Brigade, 3rd Division, IX Corps, Army of the Potomac, to April 1863. 1st Brigade, 2nd Division, VII Corps, Department of Virginia, to July 1863. 3rd Brigade, Getty's Division, United States Forces, Norfolk and Portsmouth, Department of Virginia and North Carolina, to April 1864. 2nd Brigade, 1st Division, XVIII Corps, Department of Virginia and North Carolina, to December 1864. 2nd Brigade, 3rd Division, XXIV Corps, Department of Virginia, to June 1865.

The 10th New Hampshire Infantry mustered out of service June 21, 1865. Veterans and recruits were transferred to the 2nd New Hampshire Infantry.

== Detailed service ==
Left New Hampshire and moved to Washington, D.C., September 22–25, 1862; then to Frederick, Md., September 30; to Sandy Hook, Md., October 4, and to Pleasant Valley October 6. Duty at Pleasant Valley, Md., until October 27, 1862. Movement to Falmouth, Va., October 27-November 19. Battle of Fredericksburg, December 12–15.

Burnside's Second Campaign ("Mud March") January 20–24, 1863. Moved to Newport News, Va., February 9, then to Norfolk and Suffolk March 14. Siege of Suffolk April 12-May 4. Battery Huger, Hill's Point, April 19. Reconnaissance across Nansemond River May 4. Moved to Portsmouth May 13, thence to Yorktown, Va. Dix's Peninsula Campaign June 24-July 7. Expedition from White House to South Anna River July 1–7. Moved to Portsmouth July 8–14, and to Julien Creek July 30. Duty there until March 19, 1864.

Ballahock, on Bear Quarter Road, and Deep Creek, February 29-March 1, 1864. Moved to Great Bridge March 19, then to Yorktown April 19. Butler's operations on south side of the James River against Petersburg and Richmond May 4–28. Port Walthal Junction May 7. Chester Station May 7. Swift Creek (or Arrowfield Church) May 9–10. Operations against Fort Darling May 12–16. Battle of Drewry's Bluff May 14–16. Bermuda Hundred May 17–27. Moved to White House, then to Cold Harbor May 27–31. Cold Harbor June 1–12. Before Petersburg June 15–19. Siege of Petersburg and Richmond June 15, 1864, to April 2, 1865. Chaffin's Farm, New Market Heights, Fort Harrison, September 28–30, 1864. Battle of Fair Oaks October 27–28. Duty in lines north of James River before Richmond until April 1865. Occupation of Richmond April 3. Provost duty at Manchester until June 21.

== Casualties ==
The regiment lost a total of 195 men during service; 7 officers and 54 enlisted men killed or mortally wounded, 1 officer and 133 enlisted men died of disease.

== Commanders ==
- Colonel Michael Thomas Donohoe.

== Notable members ==
- Lieutenant Colonel John Coughlin - Medal of Honor recipient for action at Swifts Creek, Virginia, May 9, 1864.

== See also ==
- List of New Hampshire Civil War units
- New Hampshire in the American Civil War
