= Battle of Proctor's Creek =

Battle of the American Civil War

Coordinates: 37.3935°N 77.4277°W

- Part of the American Civil War
| Date | May 12, 1864 – May 16, 1864 |
| Location | Chesterfield County, Virginia |
| Result | Confederate victory |

Belligerents
| United States (Union) | (Confederate States of America) CSA (Confederacy) |

Commanders and leaders
| Benjamin F. Butler | P. G. T. Beauregard |

Strength
| 30,000 | 18,000 |

Casualties and losses
| 4,160 | 2,506 |

The Battle of Proctor's Creek – also referred to as Drewry's Bluff or Fort Darling – was fought from May 12 to May 16, 1864, in Chesterfield County, Virginia, during the Bermuda Hundred Campaign of the American Civil War. Proctor's Creek was named for Charles Proctor, who lived and farmed on the land surrounding most of the creek.

== Battle ==
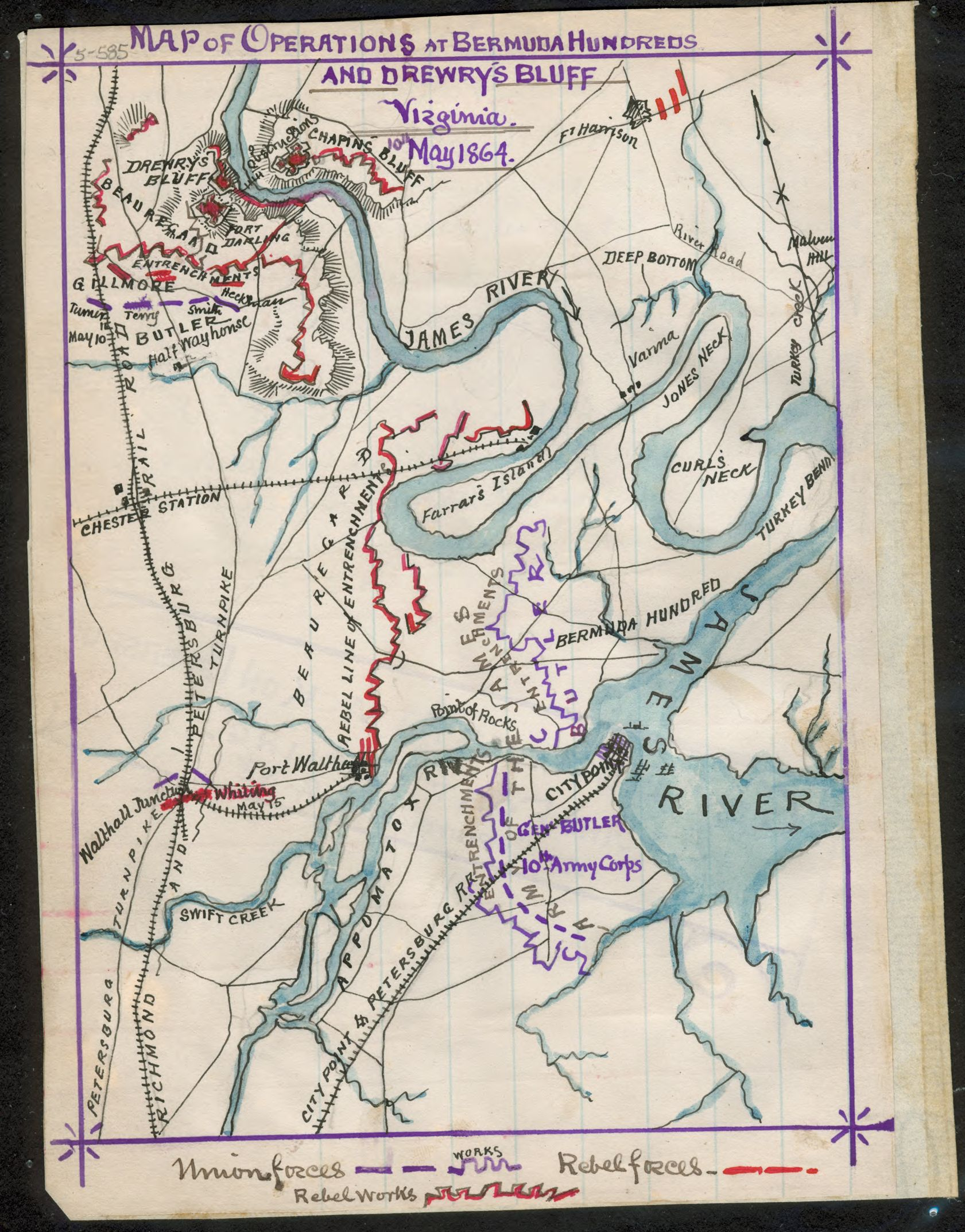
Map of operations at Bermuda Hundred and Drewry's Bluff, VA, May, 1864, by Edward K. Sneden.

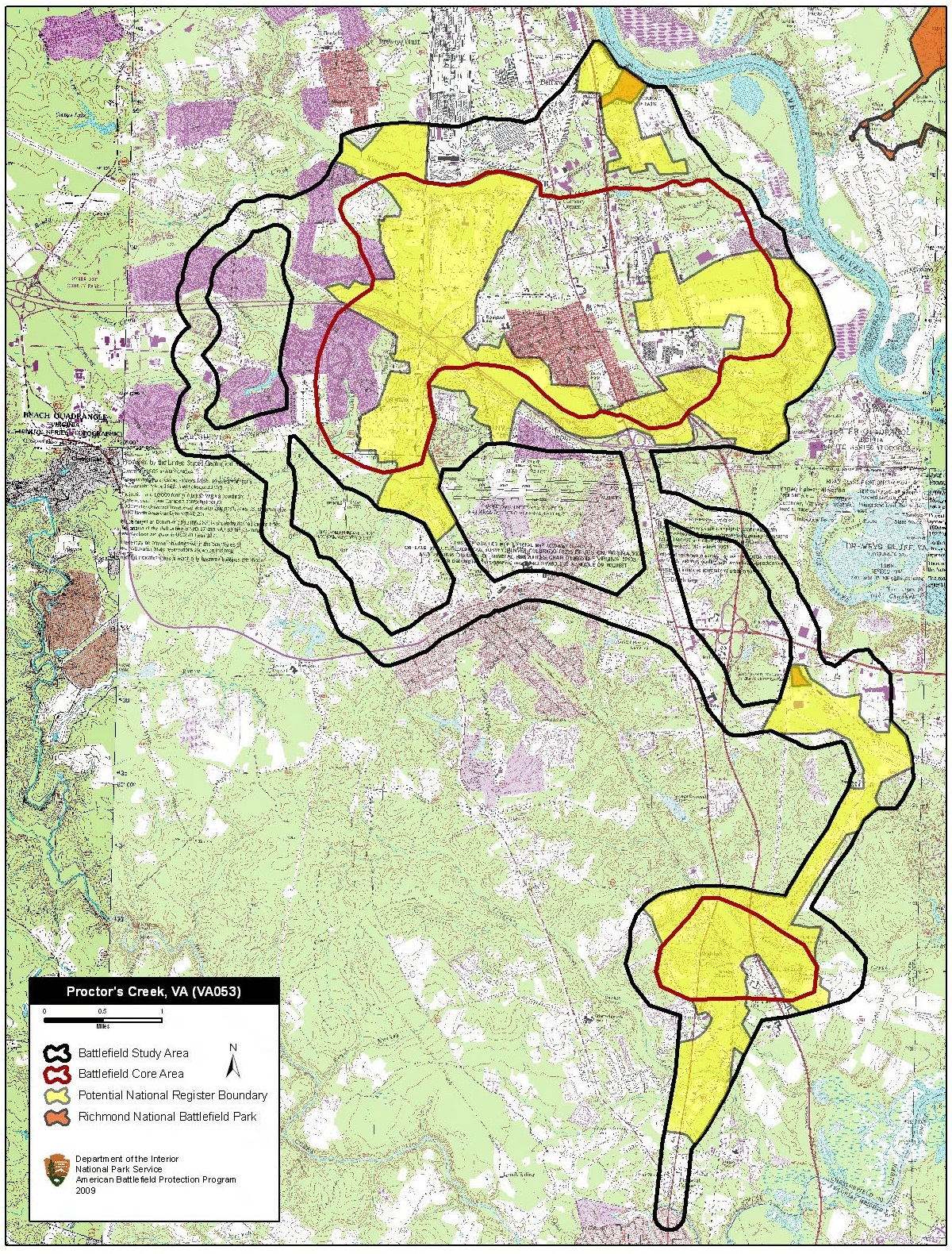
Map of Proctor's Creek Battlefield core and study areas by the American Battlefield Protection Program.

After his repulse at Swift Creek and Fort Clifton on May 9, Union Maj. Gen. Benjamin Butler withdrew into his entrenchments at Bermuda Hundred. A Confederate army of 18,000 was patched together under command of Gen. P. G. T. Beauregard to confront Butler's 30,000. On May 12, Butler moved north against the Confederate line at Drewry's Bluff, but again adopted a defensive posture when his attack was not supported by gunboats. On May 13, a Union column struck the right flank of the Confederate line at the Wooldridge House, carrying a line of works. Butler remained cautious, however, giving Beauregard time to concentrate his forces. On May 16 at dawn, Maj. Gen. Robert Ransom's Confederate division opened an attack on Butler's right flank, routing many units. Subsequent attacks lost direction in the fog, but the Federals were disorganized and demoralized. After severe fighting, Butler extricated himself from battle, withdrawing again to his Bermuda Hundred Line.

== Aftermath ==
There were approximately 6,600 total casualties. This battle stopped Butler's offensive against Richmond. The battlefield is now part of the Richmond National Battlefield Park.
