= 4th New Hampshire Infantry Regiment =

- Active: September 18, 1861, to August 23, 1865
- Country: United States
- Allegiance: Union
- Branch: Infantry
- Engagements: Battle of Port Royal; Skirmish of the Brick Church; Second Battle of Charleston Harbor; Bermuda Hundred Campaign; Battle of Cold Harbor; Siege of Petersburg; Battle of the Crater; Second Battle of Deep Bottom; Battle of Chaffin's Farm; Battle of Fair Oaks & Darbytown Road; First Battle of Fort Fisher; Second Battle of Fort Fisher; Carolinas campaign; Battle of Wilmington

The 4th New Hampshire Infantry Regiment was an infantry regiment that served in the Union Army during the American Civil War.

== Service ==
The 4th New Hampshire Infantry was organized in Manchester, New Hampshire, and mustered in for a three-year enlistment on September 18, 1861.

The regiment was attached to Casey's Provisional Brigade, Army of the Potomac, October 1861. Wright's 3rd Brigade, Sherman's South Carolina Expeditionary Corps to March 1862. District of Florida, Department of the South, to September 1862. Brannan's Brigade, District of Beaufort, South Carolina, X Corps, Department of the South, to April 1863. United States Forces, Folly Island, South Carolina, X Corps to June 1863. 1st Brigade, United States Forces, Folly Island, South Carolina, to July 1863. 1st Brigade, 1st Division, Morris Island, South Carolina, X Corps, July 1863. 1st Brigade, Morris Island, South Carolina, to January 1864. District of Beaufort, South Carolina, to February 1864. Foster's Brigade, Dodge's Division, District of Florida, February 1864. District of Beaufort, South Carolina, to April 1864. 1st Brigade, 3rd Division, X Corps, Army of the James, Department of Virginia and North Carolina, to May 1864. 3rd Brigade, 3rd Division, XVIII Corps, Army of the Potomac, to June 1864. 3rd Brigade, 2nd Division, X Corps, to December 1864. 3rd Brigade, 2nd Division, XXIV Corps, to March 1865. 3rd Brigade, 2nd Division, X Corps, Department of North Carolina, to August 1865.

The 4th New Hampshire Infantry mustered out of service August 23, 1865.

== Detailed service ==
Moved to Washington, D.C., September 27–30; then to Annapolis, Md., October 9. Expedition to Port Royal, S.C., October 21-November 7, 1861. Capture of Forts Walker and Beauregard, Port Royal Harbor, November 7. Duty at Hilton Head, S.C., until January 21, 1862. Expedition to Florida January 21-March 2. Occupation of Fernandina, Fla., March 5. Occupation of Jacksonville, Fla., March 12 to April 8 (Companies E and F, provost duty at Fernandina until April). Regiment moved from Jacksonville to St. Augustine, Fla., April 9, and garrison duty there until September 6. (Companies B, H, and K moved to James Island, S.C., June 8. Action on James Island June 10. Moved to Beaufort, S.C., June 12, and duty there until April 1863.) Regiment moved from St., Augustine, Fla., to Beaufort, S.C., September 6, 1862, and duty there until April 1863. Expedition to Pocotaligo, S.C., October 21–23, 1862. Action at Caston and Frampton's Plantations, Pocotaligo, October 22. Expedition against Charleston April 4–11, 1863. Expedition to North Edisto River April 17–28. Moved to Folly Island, S.C., April 29, and siege operations against Morris Island until July. Expedition to James Island July 9–16. Secessionville July 16. Siege operations against Forts Wagner and Gregg, Morris Island, S.C., and against Fort Sumter and Charleston until January 1864. Capture of Forts Wagner and Gregg September 7, 1863. Moved to Beaufort, S.C., January 17. Expedition to Whitmarsh Island February 20–22, 1864. Moved to Jacksonville, Fla., February 23, and return to Beaufort, S.C., February 26. Veterans on furlough March–April. Non-veterans at Beaufort until April 12, then ordered to Gloucester Point, Va. Butler's operations on south side of James River and against Petersburg and Richmond May 4–27. Capture of Bermuda Hundred and City Point May 5. Chester Station May 6–7. Swift Creek (or Arrowfield Church) May 9–10. Operations against Fort Darling May 12–16. Drewry's Bluff May 14–16. Bermuda Hundred May 16–27. Moved to White House Landing, then to Cold Harbor May 27-June 1. Battles of Cold Harbor June 1–12. Before Petersburg June 15–19. Siege of Petersburg June 16 to December 7. Duty in trenches before Petersburg June 23 to July 30. Mine Explosion July 30. Demonstration north of James River August 13–20. Strawberry Plains August 14–18. Bermuda Hundred August 24–25. Duty in trenches before Petersburg until September 25. (Non-veterans mustered out September 18, 1864.) New Market Heights, Chaffin's Farm, September 28–30. Duty on north side of the James, operating against Richmond, until December 7. Fair Oaks October 27–28. Expedition to Fort Fisher, N.C., December 7–27. 2nd Expedition to Fort Fisher January 7–15, 1865. Assault and capture of Fort Fisher January 15. Sugar Loaf Battery February 11. Fort Anderson February 18. Capture of Wilmington February 22. Advance on Kinston and Goldsboro March 6–21. Guard railroad from Little Washington to Goldsboro until August.

== Casualties ==
The regiment lost a total of 234 men during service; 3 officers and 82 enlisted men killed or mortally wounded, 5 officers and 194 enlisted men died of disease.

== Commanders ==
- Colonel Louis Bell
- Captain Frank W. Parker - commanded at the Battle of the Crater

== Notable members ==
- Major Josiah Eastman, regimental surgeon - New Hampshire state representative (1847-1850) and state senator (1853-1854)
- Lieutenant Colonel Francis "Frank" Wayland Parker - pioneer of the progressive school movement

== See also ==
- List of New Hampshire Civil War units
- New Hampshire in the American Civil War
