= 12th New Hampshire Infantry Regiment =

- Active: September 10, 1862, to June 21, 1865
- Country: United States
- Allegiance: Union
- Branch: Infantry
- Size: 1,450
- Engagements: Battle of Fredericksburg; Battle of Chancellorsville; Battle of Gettysburg; Battle of Swift Creek; Battle of Drewry's Bluff; Bermuda Hundred Campaign; Battle of Cold Harbor; Siege of Petersburg; Second Battle of Petersburg; Battle of the Crater (reserve)

The 12th New Hampshire Infantry Regiment was an infantry regiment that served in the Union Army during the American Civil War. It was also a unit that existed for a time following the Revolutionary War (see the History of Fitzwilliam, NH (Norton), p. 351-353).

== Service ==
The 12th New Hampshire Infantry was organized in Concord, New Hampshire, and mustered in for a three-year enlistment on September 10, 1862, under the command of Colonel Joseph Haydn Potter.

The regiment was attached to Casey's Division, Military District of Washington, to December 1862. 2nd Brigade, 3rd Division, III Corps, Army of the Potomac, to June 1863. 1st Brigade, 2nd Division, III Corps, Army of the Potomac, to July 1863. Marston's Command, Point Lookout, Maryland, District of St. Mary's, to April 1864. 2nd Brigade, 2nd Division, XVIII Corps, Department of Virginia and North Carolina, to December 1864. 2nd Brigade, 3rd Division, XXIV Corps, Department of Virginia, to June 1865.

The 12th New Hampshire Infantry mustered out of service June 21, 1865.

== Detailed service ==
Dates	Actions/Events
1862
September 27	Left New Hampshire for Washington, D.C.
Until October	Duty in the defenses of Washington
October 18	Moved to Point of Rocks, Md.
October 19	Then moved to Pleasant Valley
October 24-November 16	Moved to Warrenton, Va.
November 18–24	Moved to Falmouth
December 12–15	Battle of Fredericksburg
1863
January 20–24	Burnside's 2nd Campaign ("Mud March")
Until April	Duty at Falmouth
April 27-May 6	Chancellorsville Campaign
May 1–5	Battle of Chancellorsville
June 11-July 24	Gettysburg Campaign
July 1–3	Battle of Gettysburg
July 26	Ordered to Point Lookout, Md. with duty there guarding prisoners until April 7, 1864.
1864
April 7	Moved to Yorktown then to Williamsburg
May 4–28	Butler's operations on south side of the James River and against Petersburg and Richmond
May 9–10	Swift Creek (or Arrowfield Church)
May 12–16	Operations against Fort Darling
May 14–16	Battle of Drewry's Bluff
May 16–27	Bermuda Hundred
May 27–31	Moved to White House, then to Cold Harbor
June 1–12	Battles about Cold Harbor
June 15–19	Before Petersburg
June 16 to April 2, 1865	Siege of Petersburg and Richmond
July 30, 1864	Mine Explosion, Petersburg (Reserve)
August 26 to December	Duty on the Bermuda Front
1865
April 1865	In trenches before Richmond
April 3	Occupation of Richmond
Until June	Guard and provost duty at Manchester

== Service at Gettysburg ==
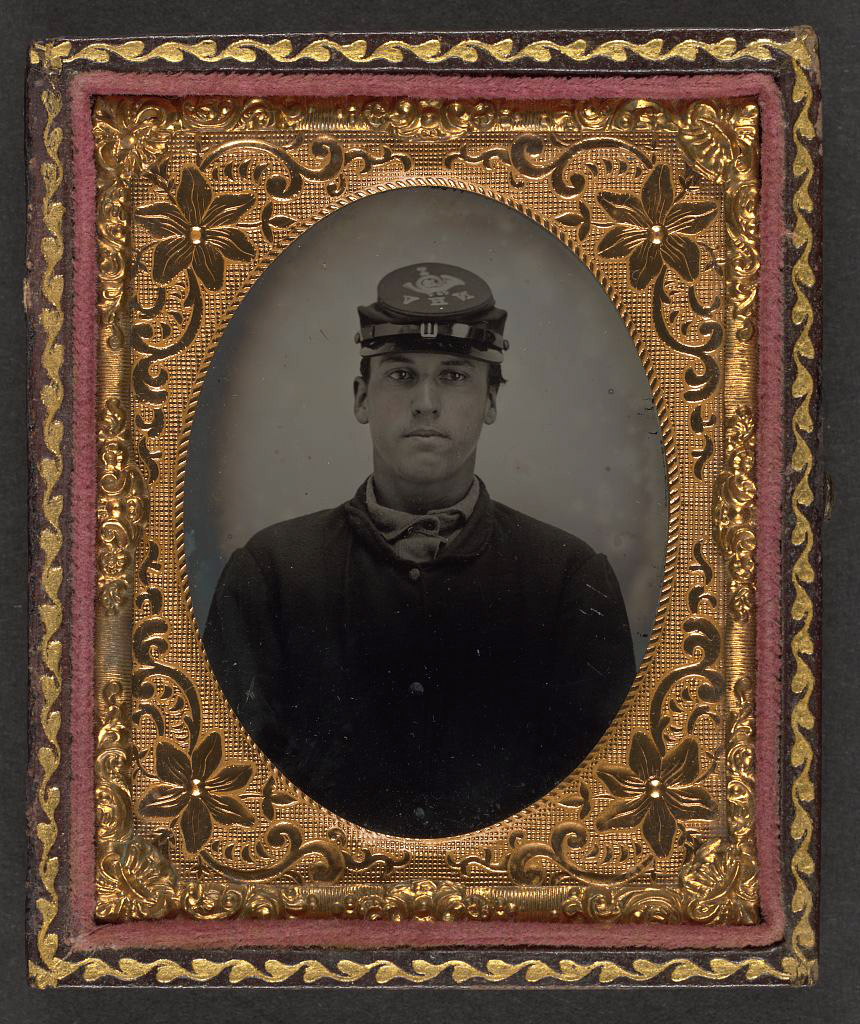
Lorenzo Hawkins of Company I, 12th New Hampshire

On July 2, 1863, the 12th New Hampshire was heavily engaged north of the Klingel Farm, facing attack by Wilcox's Alabama brigade. The regiment had 224 men on the field that day, of whom 26 were killed and 73 were wounded (an additional six men would die of their wounds). Captain John F. Langley (Company F) was in command, and was wounded when the regiment was ordered to withdraw. Lieutenant William H. H. Fernel (Company I) took command and was able to rescue some 50 Union soldiers who were captured during the withdrawal. The following day, only 50 men were fit for duty under the command of Captain Thomas E. Barker (Company B). Placed near the center of the Union line, they helped repulse Pickett's charge.

== Casualties ==
The regiment lost a total of 320 men during service; 11 officers and 170 enlisted men killed or mortally wounded, 1 officer and 138 enlisted men died of disease.

== Commanders ==
- Colonel Joseph Haydn Potter
- Colonel Thomas E. Barker
- Lieutenant Colonel John F. Marsh
- Lieutenant Colonel George D. Savage
- Captain John F. Langley - commanded at the battle of Gettysburg, July 2, 1863; wounded in action
- Captain Thomas E. Barker - commanded at the battle of Gettysburg, July 3, 1863

== See also ==
- List of New Hampshire Civil War units
- New Hampshire in the American Civil War
