= 9th New Hampshire Infantry Regiment =

- Active: August 15, 1862, to June 10, 1865
- Country: United States
- Allegiance: Union
- Branch: Infantry
- Engagements: Battle of South Mountain; Battle of Antietam; Battle of Fredericksburg; Siege of Vicksburg; Battle of the Wilderness; Battle of Spotsylvania Court House; Battle of Totopotomoy Creek; Battle of Cold Harbor; Siege of Petersburg; Second Battle of Petersburg; Battle of the Crater; Battle of Boydton Plank Road; Appomattox Campaign; Third Battle of Petersburg

The 9th New Hampshire Infantry Regiment was an infantry regiment that served in the Union Army during the American Civil War.

== Service ==
The 9th New Hampshire Infantry was organized in Concord, New Hampshire and mustered in for a three-year enlistment on August 15, 1862.

The regiment was attached to 1st Brigade, 2nd Division, IX Corps, Army of the Potomac, to March 1863. 1st Brigade, 2nd Division, IX Corps, Department of the Ohio, to June 1863. 1st Brigade, 2nd Division, IX Corps, Army of the Tennessee, to September, 1863. District of North Central Kentucky, 1st Division, XXIII Corps, Department of the Ohio, to February 1864. 1st Brigade, 2nd Division, IX Corps, Army of the Ohio, to April 1864. 2nd Brigade, 2nd Division, IX Corps, Army of the Potomac, to June 1865.

The 9th New Hampshire Infantry mustered out of service June 10, 1865. Recruits whose enlistments had not expired were transferred to the 6th New Hampshire Infantry.

== Detailed service ==
Left New Hampshire for Washington, D.C., August 25, 1862. At Arlington Heights, Va., until September 6. March to Monocacy River to join army September 6–13. Battle of South Mountain, Md., September 14, 1862. Battle of Antietam, September 16–17. Duty in Pleasant Valley, Md., until October 27, 1862. Movement to Falmouth, Va., October 27-November 19. Waterloo Bridge November 9–10. Battle of Fredericksburg, December 12–15.

Burnside's Second Campaign, "Mud March," January 20–24, 1863. Moved to Newport News, Va., February 11; then to Lexington, Ky., March 25–31. Duty in central Kentucky until June. Moved to Vicksburg, Miss., June 3–14. Siege of Vicksburg, Miss., June 14-July 4. Advance on Jackson, Miss., July 4–10. Siege of Jackson, Miss., July 10–17. At Milldale, Miss., until August 10. Moved to Covington, Ky., August 10–21; then to Camp Nelson, Ky., August 25. Duty guarding railroad between Cincinnati, Ohio, and Camp Nelson, Ky., until January 1864.

Moved to Camp Burnside January 15, 1864. March to Knoxville, Tenn., February 19-March 17. March across Cumberland Mountains to Camp Burnside and Nicholasville, Ky., March 21–31. Moved to Annapolis, Md., April 2–5. Campaign from the Rapidan to the James River, Va., May 3-June 15. Battles of the Wilderness May 5–7; Spotsylvania May 8–12; Spotsylvania Court House May 12–21. Assault on the Salient at Spotsylvania Court House May 12. North Anna River May 23–26. On line of the Pamunkey May 26–28. Totopotomoy May 28–31. Cold Harbor June 1–12. Bethesda Church June 1–3. Before Petersburg June 16–19. Siege of Petersburg June 16, 1864, to April 2, 1865. Mine Explosion, Petersburg, July 30, 1864. Weldon Railroad August 18–21. Poplar Springs Church September 29-October 2. Boydton Plank Road, October 27–28. Garrison, Fort Alexander Hays, until April 1865.

Appomattox Campaign March 28-April 9, 1865. Assault on and fall of Petersburg April 2. Occupation of Petersburg April 3. Pursuit of Lee April 3–6. Detached to guard Ewell's Army April 6. Moved to Alexandria April 20–27 and duty there until June. Grand Review of the Armies May 23.

== Casualties ==
The regiment lost a total of 409 men during service; 10 officers and 145 enlisted men killed or mortally wounded, 3 officers and 251 enlisted men died of disease.

== Commanders ==
- Colonel Enoch Q. Fellows
- Colonel Herbert Bradwell Titus
- Lieutenant Colonel John W. Babbitt - commanded at the battles of Fredericksburg and the Wilderness
- Captain John B. Cooper - commanded at the battle of the Crater

== See also ==
- List of New Hampshire Civil War units
- New Hampshire in the American Civil War
