= Joab N. Patterson =

American Civil War officer (1835–1923)

Joab Nelson Patterson
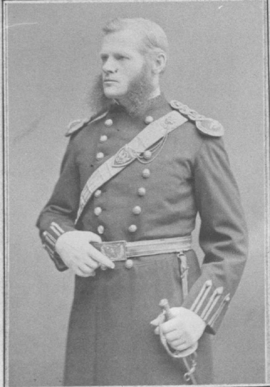
- Born: January 2, 1835; Hopkinton, New Hampshire, U.S.
- Died: July 18, 1923 (aged 88); Concord, New Hampshire, U.S.
- Burial place: Blossom Hill and Calvary Cemeteries, Concord, New Hampshire
- Alma mater: Dartmouth College
- Spouse: Sarah Cilley Bouton (m. 1867–1911)
- Children: 3
- Military career
- Allegiance: United States (Union)
- Branch: United States Army (Union Army)
- Service years: 1861–1865; 1898
- Rank: Colonel; Bvt. Brigadier General
- Commands: 2nd New Hampshire Infantry Regiment
- Conflicts: American Civil War: Gettysburg campaign; Battle of Gettysburg; Siege of Petersburg; Battle of Fair Oaks & Darbytown Road; Appomattox campaign; Spanish–American War

Joab Nelson Patterson (1835–1923) was an American brevet brigadier general and politician who commanded the 2nd New Hampshire Infantry Regiment across several battles of the American Civil War, as well as the commander of the Third Brigade of the First Division of the XVIII Corps. He also held several offices after the war as well as a captain during the Spanish–American War.

== Biography ==
=== Before the war ===
Joab was born on January 2, 1835, in Hopkinton, New Hampshire. He was educated at Contoocook Academy in Hopkinton and at Dartmouth College, graduating in 1860. Prior to the outbreak of the Civil War, he was a teacher in New Hampshire and Massachusetts.

=== American Civil War ===
In 1861, Patterson opened a recruitment office at Contoocook and managed to enlist enough men to form a company of the 2nd New Hampshire Infantry Regiment. Patterson was made 1st Lieutenant of Company H. He was promoted to captain on May 23, 1862, but was wounded during the Battle of Gettysburg a year later. Around this time, Patterson was given command of the Third Brigade of the First Division of the XVIII Corps and went on to participate at the Battle of Fair Oaks & Darbytown Road. He was promoted to lieutenant colonel on June 21, 1864. Patterson was promoted to full colonel on January 10, 1865, and brevetted brigadier general on March 3, 1865, before being honorably mustered out in December 1865.

=== Later years ===
Patterson was a member of the New Hampshire House of Representatives from 1867 to 1886, the U.S. Marshal for the state from 1867 to 1886, and was the Second Auditor of the United States Department of the Treasury from 1889 to 1893. During this time, Patterson moved to Washington, D.C., to continue his political career. He married Sarah Cilley Bouton in 1867 and proceeded to have three children with her. In 1898, Patterson re-enlisted in the United States Army due to the outbreak of the Spanish–American War and briefly became a captain. After the war, Patterson stayed in Havana as the Superintendent of Public Buildings. A Republican, Patterson was a member of the Sons of the American Revolution, the Wonalancet Club, the Grand Army of the Republic, and the Knights Templar. Patterson died at his home in Concord, New Hampshire, on July 18, 1923, and was buried at the Blossom Hill and Calvary Cemeteries.

== See also ==
- List of American Civil War brevet generals (Union)
