= Joseph Messer Clough =

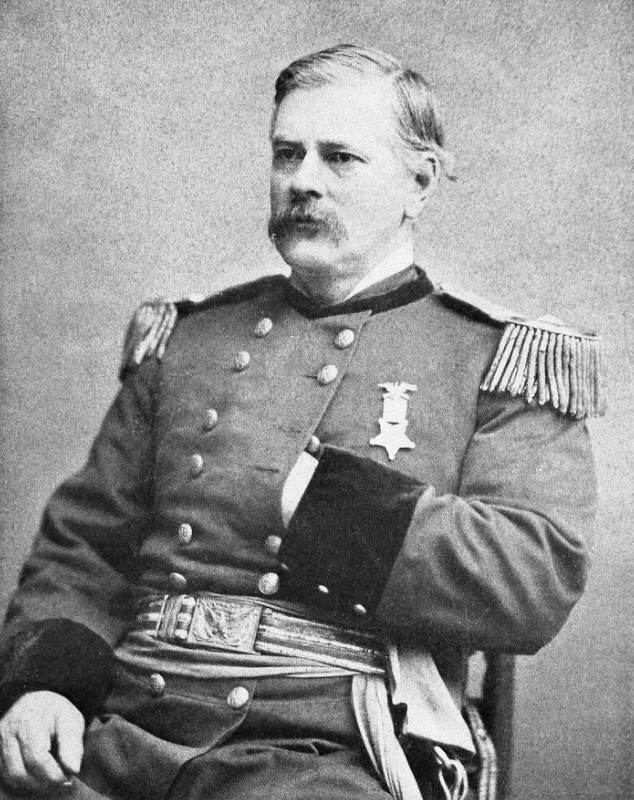
- Born: June 15, 1828; Sunapee, New Hampshire, US
- Died: May 7, 1919 (aged 90); New London, New Hampshire, US
- Occupation: Military officer
- Spouses: Abiah Bucklin (m. 1849; died 1873) Cornelia Goss Chase (m. 1874)

Joseph Messer Clough (June 15, 1828 – May 7, 1919) was a Union Army lieutenant colonel during the American Civil War, who was appointed and confirmed to the grade of brevet brigadier general of volunteers in 1866.

== Biography ==
Clough was born June 15, 1828, in Sunapee, New Hampshire. He attended Norwich University in Vermont for six months. Clough led the City Guard of Manchester, New Hampshire, and was a member of the City Guard at Lowell, Massachusetts. He was a machinist and mill operator before the Civil War.

On April 26, 1861, he enlisted in the Union Army as a private with the 1st New Hampshire Volunteer Infantry, a 90-day regiment, and was soon appointed a lieutenant. The regiment was mustered out in August, 1861. On September 18, 1861, Clough was appointed captain in the 4th New Hampshire Volunteer Infantry Regiment. On July 30, 1864, he was wounded in the mine explosion at Petersburg, Virginia. On October 18, 1864, Clough became a lieutenant colonel with the 10th New Hampshire Volunteer Infantry Regiment. In March 1865, he was wounded at Fort Stedman. Clough was mustered out of the volunteers on July 29, 1865.

On July 9, 1866, President Andrew Johnson nominated Clough for appointment to the grade of brevet brigadier general of volunteers, to rank from March 13, 1865, and the United States Senate confirmed the appointment on July 23, 1866. In 1909, Clough was appointed to the rank of major general in the state militia by New Hampshire Governor Henry B. Quinby.

After the Civil War Clough was a farmer and railroad mail agent.

== Personal life ==
Clough married Abiah Bucklin on September 7, 1849. She died on December 17, 1873, and he remarried to Cornelia Goss Chase on September 13, 1874.

Joseph Messer Clough died in New London, New Hampshire, on May 7, 1919. He was buried in Montcalm Cemetery, Enfield Center, New Hampshire.

== See also ==
- List of American Civil War brevet generals (Union)
