= List of New Hampshire units in the American Civil War =

List of military units raised by the state of New Hampshire during the American Civil War.

== Infantry ==
- 1st New Hampshire Volunteer Infantry Regiment
- 2nd New Hampshire Volunteer Infantry Regiment
- 3rd New Hampshire Volunteer Infantry Regiment
- 4th New Hampshire Volunteer Infantry Regiment
- 5th New Hampshire Volunteer Infantry Regiment
- 6th New Hampshire Volunteer Infantry Regiment
- 7th New Hampshire Volunteer Infantry Regiment
- 8th New Hampshire Volunteer Infantry Regiment
- 9th New Hampshire Volunteer Infantry Regiment
- 10th New Hampshire Volunteer Infantry Regiment
- 11th New Hampshire Volunteer Infantry Regiment
- 12th New Hampshire Volunteer Infantry Regiment
- 13th New Hampshire Volunteer Infantry Regiment
- 14th New Hampshire Volunteer Infantry Regiment
- 15th New Hampshire Volunteer Infantry Regiment
- 16th New Hampshire Volunteer Infantry Regiment
- 18th New Hampshire Volunteer Infantry Regiment

Note: 17th New Hampshire failed to complete organization; its two companies were transferred to 2nd New Hampshire.

== Cavalry ==
- 1st New Hampshire Volunteer Cavalry Regiment
- 2nd New Hampshire Volunteer Cavalry Regiment

== Artillery ==
- 1st New Hampshire Heavy Artillery Volunteer Regiment
- 1st New Hampshire Light Battery

== Sharpshooters ==
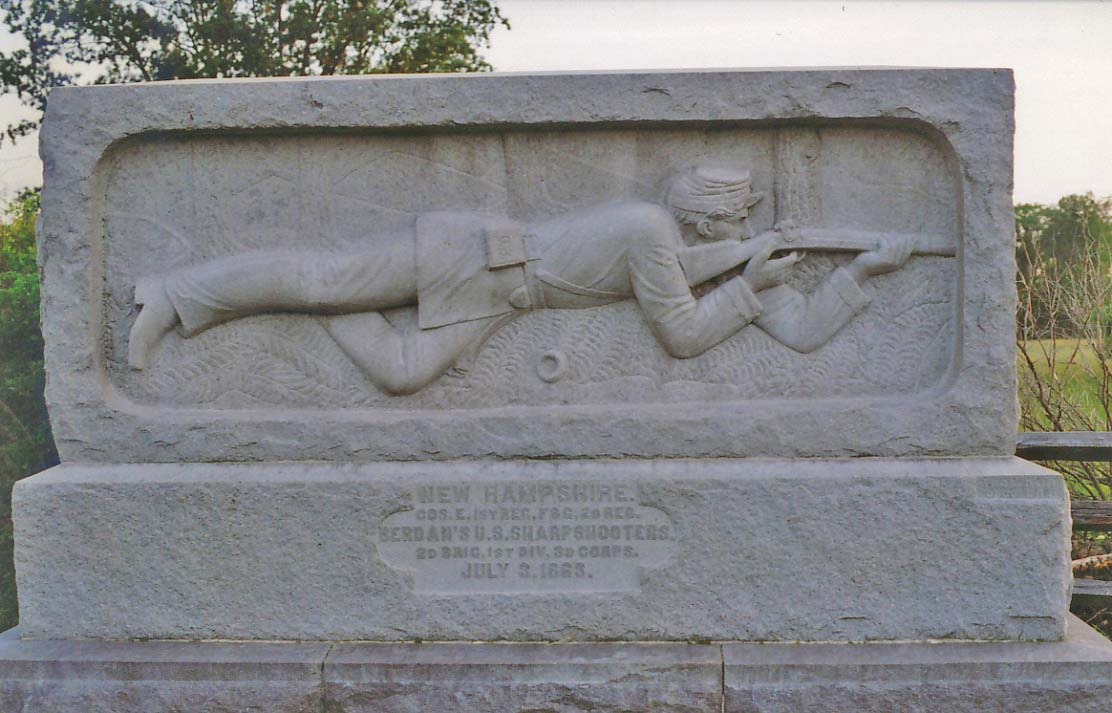
New Hampshire Sharpshooters Monument at Gettysburg

- 1st Company New Hampshire Sharpshooters [assigned as Company E, 1st United States Volunteer Sharpshooter Regiment]
- 2nd Company New Hampshire Sharpshooters [assigned as Company F, 2nd United States Volunteer Sharpshooter Regiment]
- 3rd Company New Hampshire Sharpshooters [assigned as Company G, 2nd United States Volunteer Sharpshooter Regiment]

== See also ==
- New Hampshire in the American Civil War
- New Hampshire Historical Marker No. 236: Concord's Civil War Mustering Camps
- Lists of American Civil War Regiments by State
