= 8th New Hampshire Infantry Regiment =

- Active: December 23, 1861 to December 1863 as 8th Infantry; December 1863 to November 9, 1865 as 2nd Cavalry
- Country: United States
- Allegiance: Union
- Branch: Infantry
- Engagements: Battle of Georgia Landing; Bayou Teche Campaign; Battle of Fort Bisland; Battle of Irish Bend; Battle of Port Hudson; Sabine Pass Expedition

The 8th New Hampshire Infantry Regiment was an infantry regiment that served in the Union Army during the American Civil War.

== Service ==
The 8th New Hampshire Infantry was organized at Camp Currier, in Manchester, New Hampshire, and mustered in for a three-year enlistment on December 23, 1861, under the command of Colonel Hawkes Fearing, Jr..

The regiment was attached to Butler's New Orleans Expedition to March 1862. 1st Brigade, Department of the Gulf (DoG), to November 1862. Independent Command, DoG, to January 1863. 2nd Brigade, 3rd Division, XIX Corps, DoG, to September 1863.

The 8th New Hampshire Infantry ceased to exist in December 1863 when its designation was changed to the 2nd New Hampshire Cavalry.

It was next attached to 4th Brigade, Cavalry Division, DoG, to June, 1864. It served in the defenses of New Orleans, DoG, to September, 1864. It moved north to the District of Natchez, Department of Mississippi, to January, 1865. That month it transferred to District of Vidalia, Department of Mississippi, where it served until March, when it returned to Natchez, remaining there until October 1865. Ordered to Vicksburg, the regiment mustered out of Federal service October 29, 1865. The men left for Concord that day, embarking on a steamer for Cairo, IL. At Cairo, the regiment began a 1,500 miles (2,400 km) railroad journey for home. Passing through Indianapolis, the men saw their first snowstorm since their departure from home. At 10:00 p.m., Tuesday, November 7, the regiment arrived back in Concord. After processing, pay, and equipment return, the regiment was discharged in the state capital, Thursday, November 9, 1865.

== Detailed service ==
Left New Hampshire for Boston, Massachusetts, January 24, 1862; then sailed for Ship Island, Mississippi, February 15, arriving there March 15. Duty at Ship Island until April 1862. Occupation of Forts Wood and Pike, Lake Pontchartrain, May 5. Moved to New Orleans and duty at Camp Parapet until October. Expedition to Lake Pontchartrain July 23 – August 2. Operations in District of LaFourche October 24 – November 6. Occupation of Donaldsonville October 25. Action at Georgia Landing, near Labadieville, October 27, and at Thibodeauxville October 27. Duty in the District of Lafourche until March 1863. Expedition to Bayou Teche January 12–14, 1863. Aboard the steamer Cotton January 14. Operations on Bayou Plaquemine and the Black and Atchafalaya rivers February 12–28. Operations against Port Hudson March 7–27. Teche Campaign April 11–20. Fort Bisland, near Centreville, April 12–13. Irish Bend April 14. Expedition from Opelousas to Chicotsville and Bayou Boeuff May 1. Expedition to Alexandria on Red River May 5–17. Movement from Alexandria to Port Hudson May 17–24. Siege of Port Hudson May 24 – July 8. Assault on Port Hudson June 14. Expedition to Niblett's Bluff May 26–29. Surrender of Port Hudson July 9. Moved to Baton Rouge, August 22. Sabine Pass Expedition September 4–11. Moved to Camp Bisland September 15 and duty there until October. Moved to Opelousas, then to Franklin, December 1863.

As 2nd Cavalry, duty at Franklin, La., till January, 1864. Re-enlisted January 4, 1864. Ordered to New Orleans, and duty there till March. Red River Campaign March 10-May 22. Advance from Franklin to Alexandria March 14–26. Action at Natchitoches March 31. Crump's Hill April 2. Wilson's Farm April 7. Bayou de Paul Carroll's Mill April 8. Battle of Pleasant Hill April 9. Natchitoches April 19 and 22. Monett's Bluff and Cane River Crossing April 23. Retreat to lexandria April 24–30. Alexandria May 1–8. Retreat to Morganza May 10–20. Mansura May 16. Near Moreauville May 17. Yellow Bayou May 18. Expedition from Morganza to the Atchafalaya May 30-June 6. Ordered to New Orleans, La., July 11. Veterans absent on furlough July 11 to August 31. Non-Veterans on duty at Camp Parapet. Regiment ordered to Natchez, Miss., September, and duty there till January 9, 1865. Operating against guerrillas, picket and garrison duty. Non-Veterans ordered home December 23, 1864, and mustered out January 18, 1865. Veterans consolidated to a Battalion of 3 Companies and ordered to Vidalia. Garrison, guard and patrol duty there till March 6, 1865. Provost duty at Natchez till October. Ordered to Vicksburg, Miss., and there mustered out October 29, 1865. Moved to Concord, N. H., October 29-November 6, and discharged November 9, 1865.

== Casualties ==
The regiment lost a total of 360 men during service; 8 officers and 94 enlisted men killed or mortally wounded, 2 officers and 256 enlisted men died of disease. (Note: This figure includes all casualties, even after the regiment was changed to the 2nd New Hampshire Cavalry.)

== Commanders ==
- Colonel Hawkes Fearing, Jr.

== See also ==
- List of New Hampshire Civil War units
- New Hampshire in the American Civil War
