= 18th New Hampshire Infantry Regiment =

- Active: July 19, 1864 — July 29, 1865
- Allegiance: Union
- Branch: Infantry
- Engagements: American Civil War: Appomattox Campaign; Third Battle of Petersburg

The 18th New Hampshire Infantry Regiment was an infantry regiment that served in the Union Army during the American Civil War.

== Service ==
The 18th New Hampshire Infantry was organized in Concord, New Hampshire, under the command of Colonel Thomas Leonard Livermore. Six companies were recruited beginning July 19, 1864, and mustered in September 13, 1864. Four additional companies were recruited beginning December 21, 1864. Companies G, H, and I joined the regiment in February, March, and April 1865.

Six companies were ordered to City Point, Virginia, September 1864 and attached to Benham's Engineer Brigade to December 1864. Clough's Provisional Brigade, Ferrero's Division, Defenses of Bermuda Hundred, Virginia, to March 1865. 3rd Brigade, 1st Division, IX Corps, Army of the Potomac, to May 1865. Garrison duty at Washington, D.C., until July 1865.

Duty in the fortifications at City Point, Virginia, until December 10, 1864. At front near Petersburg December 10–13. Reported to Gen. Ferrero, and duty in the defenses of Bermuda Hundred December 18–30. Duty at City Point until March 19, 1865. Reported to Gen. Parke, Commanding IX Corps, before Petersburg, March 19. Repulse of attack on Fort Stedman March 25. Duty at Fort Stedman until April 2. Appomattox Campaign March 28-April 9. Assault on and fall of Petersburg April 2. Occupation of Petersburg April 3. Moved to South Side Railroad and duty at Ford's Station until April 20. Moved to Washington, D.C., April 20–26. Camp at Alexandria and provost duty at Georgetown until July. Guard duty in Washington during trial of President Lincoln's assassins. Six original companies muster out June 10, 1865. Balance of Regiment muster out July 29, 1865.

Company K served its entire term of service at Galloupe's Island in Boston Harbor and mustered out May 6, 1865. The six original companies of the 18th New Hampshire Infantry mustered out of service June 10, 1865. Other companies mustered out July 29, 1865.

== Casualties ==
The regiment lost a total of 41 men during service; 1 officer and 4 enlisted men killed or mortally wounded, 36 enlisted men died of disease.

== Commanders ==
- Colonel Thomas Leonard Livermore

== See also ==
- List of New Hampshire Civil War units
- New Hampshire in the American Civil War
