= Herbert Bradwell Titus =

American military officer (1833–1905)

Herbert B. Titus
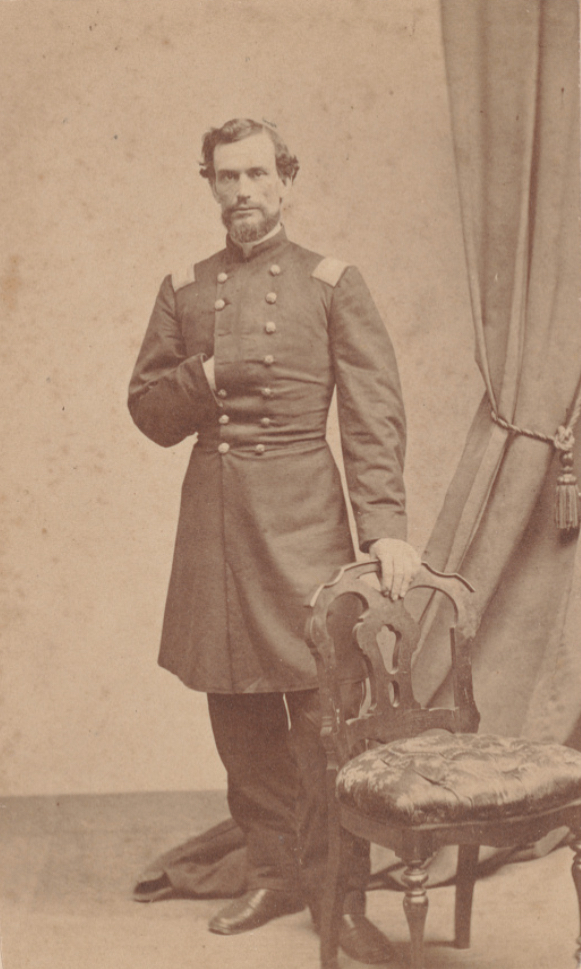
- Portrait of Titus by James Wallace Black
- Born: Herbert Bradwell Titus; December 11, 1833
- Died: June 1, 1905 (aged 71)
- Military career
- Allegiance: United States
- Branch: Union Army
- Rank: Colonel; Brevet Brigadier General
- Unit: 2nd New Hampshire Volunteer Infantry
- Commands: 9th New Hampshire Volunteer Infantry
- Conflicts: American Civil War; Battle of Antietam; Siege of Vicksburg

Herbert Bradwell Titus (December 11, 1833 – June 1, 1905) was an American Army officer. He was a Union brevet brigadier general during the period of the American Civil War. He received his appointment as brevet brigadier general dated to March 13, 1865. During much of the war, Titus served as a colonel with the 9th New Hampshire Volunteer Infantry.

Titus' father teacher Ezra Titus. He also became a teacher at age 14. In 1854, he began attending Yale College until his generous benefactor died. On June 4, 1861, he was commissioned as a second lieutenant in the 2nd New Hampshire Volunteer Infantry and was promoted to major of the 9th New Hampshire Volunteer Infantry later that month. On November 22, 1862, he became the regiment's colonel. Titus was disabled and away from combat for five months after he was wounded at the Battle of Antietam.

When Lee surrendered at Appomattox on April 9, 1865, Titus was in command of a brigade of ten regiments. After the war, he purchased land in Virginia and worked as a farmer and later worked in New York City as a lawyer.

== See also ==
- List of American Civil War brevet generals
