= John Coughlin (soldier) =

US Army officer and Medal of Honor recipient (1837–1912)

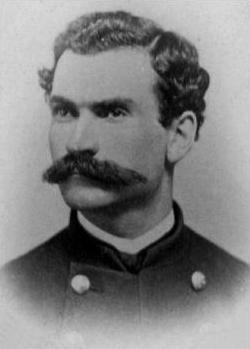
- Born: 1837; Williamstown, Vermont
- Died: May 20, 1912 (aged 74–75); Manchester, New Hampshire
- Burial place: Arlington National Cemetery
- Military career
- Allegiance: United States of America
- Branch: United States Army; Union Army
- Service years: 1862–1865
- Rank: Lieutenant Colonel; Brevet Brigadier General
- Unit: 10th New Hampshire Volunteer Infantry
- Conflicts: Battle of Swift Creek
- Awards: Medal of Honor

John Coughlin (1837 to May 20, 1912) was an American soldier who fought in the American Civil War. Coughlin received the country's highest award for bravery during combat, the Medal of Honor, for his action at Swifts Creek in Virginia on 9 May 1864. He was honored with the award on 31 August 1893.

== Biography ==
Coughlin was born in Williamstown, Vermont, in 1837. He was appointed as Lieutenant Colonel of the 10th New Hampshire Volunteer Infantry in September 1862, and mustered out with the regiment in June 1865. He received a brevet (honorary promotion) to brigadier general dated 9 April 1865 for "gallant conduct in the field".

John Coughlin Medal of Honor gravestone at Arlington National Cemetery

He died on 27 May 1912, and his remains are interred at the Arlington National Cemetery in Virginia.

== Medal of Honor citation ==
During a sudden night attack upon Burnham's Brigade, resulting in much confusion, this officer, without waiting for orders, led his regiment forward and interposed a line of battle between the advancing enemy and Hunt's Battery, repulsing the attack and saving the guns.

== See also ==
- List of American Civil War Medal of Honor recipients: A–F
