= 1st New Hampshire Cavalry Regiment =

- Active: January 7, 1864, to July 1865
- Country: United States
- Allegiance: Union
- Branch: Cavalry
- Engagements: Battle of Opequon; Battle of Fisher's Hill; Battle of Cedar Creek; Battle of Waynesboro, Virginia

The 1st New Hampshire Cavalry Regiment was a cavalry regiment that served in the Union Army during the American Civil War.

== Service ==
Four companies of cavalry were organized in Concord, New Hampshire, October 24-December 21, 1861, as a battalion and attached to the 1st New England Cavalry as Companies I, K, L, and M. (For the service of these companies, see the history of the 1st Rhode Island Cavalry.) The regiment did not reach full strength of twelve companies until July 1864.

The battalion was detached on January 7, 1864, and officially designated the 1st New Hampshire Volunteer Cavalry. The regiment was attached to the 2nd Brigade, 3rd Division, Cavalry Corps, Army of the Potomac and Army of the Shenandoah, Middle Military Division, to February 1865. Cavalry, Department of the Shenandoah, to July 1865.

The 1st New Hampshire Cavalry mustered out of service in July 1865.

== Detailed service ==
Moved to New Hampshire and on veteran furlough and organizing regiment, February to April 1864. Seven companies organized and ordered to Washington, D.C., April 23, 1864. At Camp Stoneman, Washington, D.C., until May 17, 1864. Moved to Belle Plains, Virginia. Guarded Aquia Creek and Fredericksburg S. R., and at Belle Plains until June 6, then moved to White House. (A part of the regiment was at Hanover Court House and Cold Harbor June 1–12.) Long Bridge June 12. Riddle's Shop and White Oak Swamp June 13. Smith's Store June 15. Wilson's Raid on Southside & Danville Railroad June 22–30. Ream's Station June 22. Nottaway Court House and Black and White Station June 23. Staunton Bridge (or Roanoke Station) June 25. Sappony Church (or Stony Creek) June 28–29. Ream's Station June 29. On picket duty at Light House Point and City Point June 30-August 8. Sheridan's Shenandoah Valley Campaign August to December. Winchester August 17. Summit Station August 20–21. Berryville August 21. Kearneysville August 25. Darkesville September 3. Near Brucetown and Winchester September 7. Abrams Creek September 13. Battle of Opequon, Winchester, September 19. Near Cedarville September 20. Front Royal September 21. Fisher's Hill September 22. Milford September 22. Waynesboro September 29 and October 2. Mt. Crawford October 2. Near Columbia Furnace October 7. Tom's Brook ("Woodstock Races") October 8–9. Battle of Cedar Creek October 19. Near Kernstown November 10. Newtown and Cedar Creek November 12. Rude's Hill, near Mt. Jackson, November 22. Expedition from Kernstown to Lacy Springs December 19–22. Lacy Springs December 20–21. Duty at Winchester until February 1865. Sheridan's Raid into Virginia February 27-March 3. Waynesboro March 2. Regiment led charge on enemy's works, capturing with the sabre 1,500 prisoners, all their artillery and the flag of every regiment engaged. Detached from division, to guard prisoners back to Winchester, Mt. Jackson March 4. Mt. Sidney March 5. Lacy Springs March 5. New Market March 6. Duty at and in the vicinity of Winchester, and in the Department of the Shenandoah, also at Poolesville, Maryland, July 1865. Five companies completed organization July 1864, and ordered to Washington, D.C. Guard and patrol duty and operations against Mosby's guerrillas in the Defenses of Washington March 1865. Joined regiment in the Shenandoah Valley.

== Casualties ==
The regiment lost a total of 147 men during service; 5 officers and 28 enlisted men killed or mortally wounded, 2 officers and 112 enlisted men died of disease.

== Commanders ==
- Colonel John Leverett Thompson

== See also ==
- List of New Hampshire Civil War units
- New Hampshire in the American Civil War
