= 16th New Hampshire Infantry Regiment =

- Active: October 24, 1862 – August 20, 1863
- Disbanded: August 20, 1863
- Country: United States
- Allegiance: Union
- Branch: Infantry
- Size: Regiment
- Engagements: Siege of Port Hudson

Commanders
- Notable commanders: Colonel James Pike

The 16th New Hampshire Infantry Regiment was an infantry regiment that served in the Union Army during the American Civil War.

== Service ==
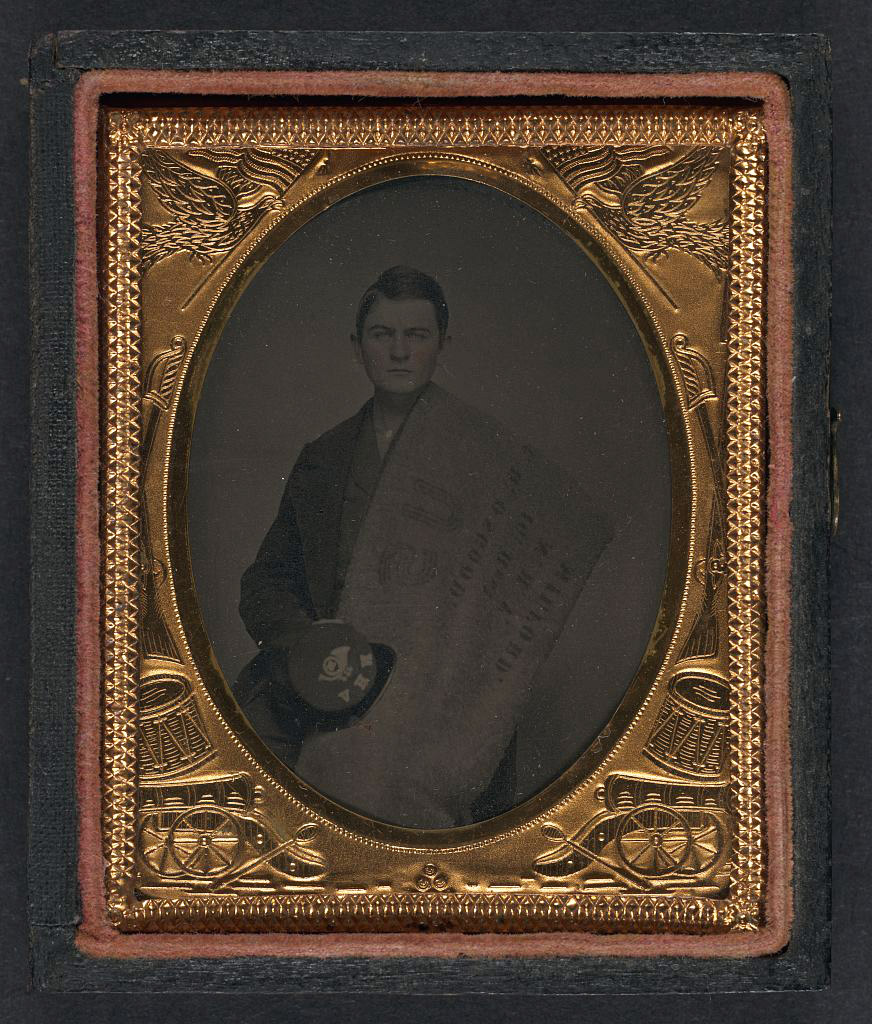
Private Charles H. Osgood of Company C, 16th New Hampshire

The 16th New Hampshire Infantry was organized in Concord, New Hampshire, and mustered into Federal service on October 24, 1862, for nine months' service under the command of Colonel James Pike.

The regiment left New Hampshire for New York November and joined Banks' Expeditionary Corps. Sailed for New Orleans, Louisiana, December 6, arriving December 20. Attached to Sherman's Division, Department of the Gulf, to January 1863. 1st Brigade, 3rd Division, XIX Corps, Army of the Gulf, to May 1863. 1st Brigade, 2nd Division, XIX Corps, to August, 1863.

Duty at Carrollton and in the defenses of New Orleans, La., until April 1863. Operations on Bayou Plaquemine and the Black and Atchafalaya rivers February 12–28. Operations against Port Hudson, Louisiana, March 7–27. Fort Burton, Butte a la Rose, April 19. At Fort Burton until May 30. Ordered to Port Hudson May 30, and assigned as guard at arsenal of Banks' Army at Springfield Landing June 3 to July 9. Surrender of Port Hudson July 9. Occupation of works until August 1. Moved to Concord, New Hampshire, August 1–14.

The 16th New Hampshire Infantry mustered out of service August 20, 1863, at Concord, New Hampshire.

== Casualties ==
The regiment lost a total of 221 men during service; 5 officers and 216 enlisted men died of disease.

== Commanders ==
- Colonel James Pike

== Notable members ==
- Colonel James Pike - U.S. Representative from New Hampshire, 1855–1859.
- Ralza M. Manly, chaplain.

== See also ==
- List of New Hampshire Civil War units
- New Hampshire in the American Civil War
