= George W. Kittredge =

American politician (1805–1881)

George Washington Kittredge
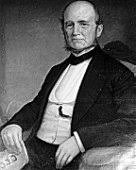
- 1870 portrait by U. D. Tenney. New Hampshire State Library.

Member of the U.S. House of Representatives from New Hampshire's 1st district
- In office March 4, 1853 – March 3, 1855
- Preceded by: Amos Tuck
- Succeeded by: James Pike

Member of the New Hampshire House of Representatives
- In office 1835, 1847–1848, 1852

Personal details
- Born: January 31, 1805 Epping, New Hampshire, U.S.
- Died: March 6, 1881 (aged 76) (Note: Kittredge's date of death is listed as March 6, 1881, per the Biographical Directory of the United States Congress. However, his death was reported in the Boston Evening Transcript of March 8, 1880, and was subsequently mentioned in The Boston Post of June 8, 1880.) Newmarket, New Hampshire, U.S.
- Resting place: Forest Hills Cemetery; Boston, Massachusetts, U.S.
- Party: Democratic
- Other political affiliations: Anti-Nebraska movement
- Profession: Physician

George Washington Kittredge (January 31, 1805 – March 6, 1881) was a U.S. representative from New Hampshire.

Born in Epping, New Hampshire, Kittredge received a liberal schooling. He attended the medical department of Harvard University and engaged in the practice of medicine in Newmarket, New Hampshire, in 1835.

Kittredge served as member of the New Hampshire House of Representatives in 1835, 1847, 1848, and 1852, and served as Speaker in the last-named year. He was a director of the Boston and Maine Railroad, 1836–1856. He served as president of the Newmarket Savings Bank for 40 years.

Kittredge was elected as an Anti-Nebraska Democrat to the 33rd United States Congress (March 1853 – March 1855). He served as chairman of the Committee on Expenditures in the Department of War. He was an unsuccessful candidate for reelection in 1854 to the 34th United States Congress and for election in 1856 to the 35th United States Congress.

Following his time in Washington, Kittredge resumed the practice of medicine. In late January 1878, The Boston Post reported he had suffered an attack of apoplexy, and "his recovery is doubtful." Kittredge died in Newmarket, New Hampshire, on March 6, 1881. He was interred in Forest Hills Cemetery in Boston.

== Notes ==
U.S. House of Representatives
Preceded by Amos Tuck	Member of the U.S. House of Representatives from New Hampshire's 1st congressional district March 4, 1853–March 3, 1855	Succeeded by James Pike
Political offices
Preceded by Nathaniel B. Baker	Speaker of the New Hampshire House of Representatives; 1852	Succeeded by Jonathan Everett Sargent
