= Gilman Marston =

United States Army general, politician

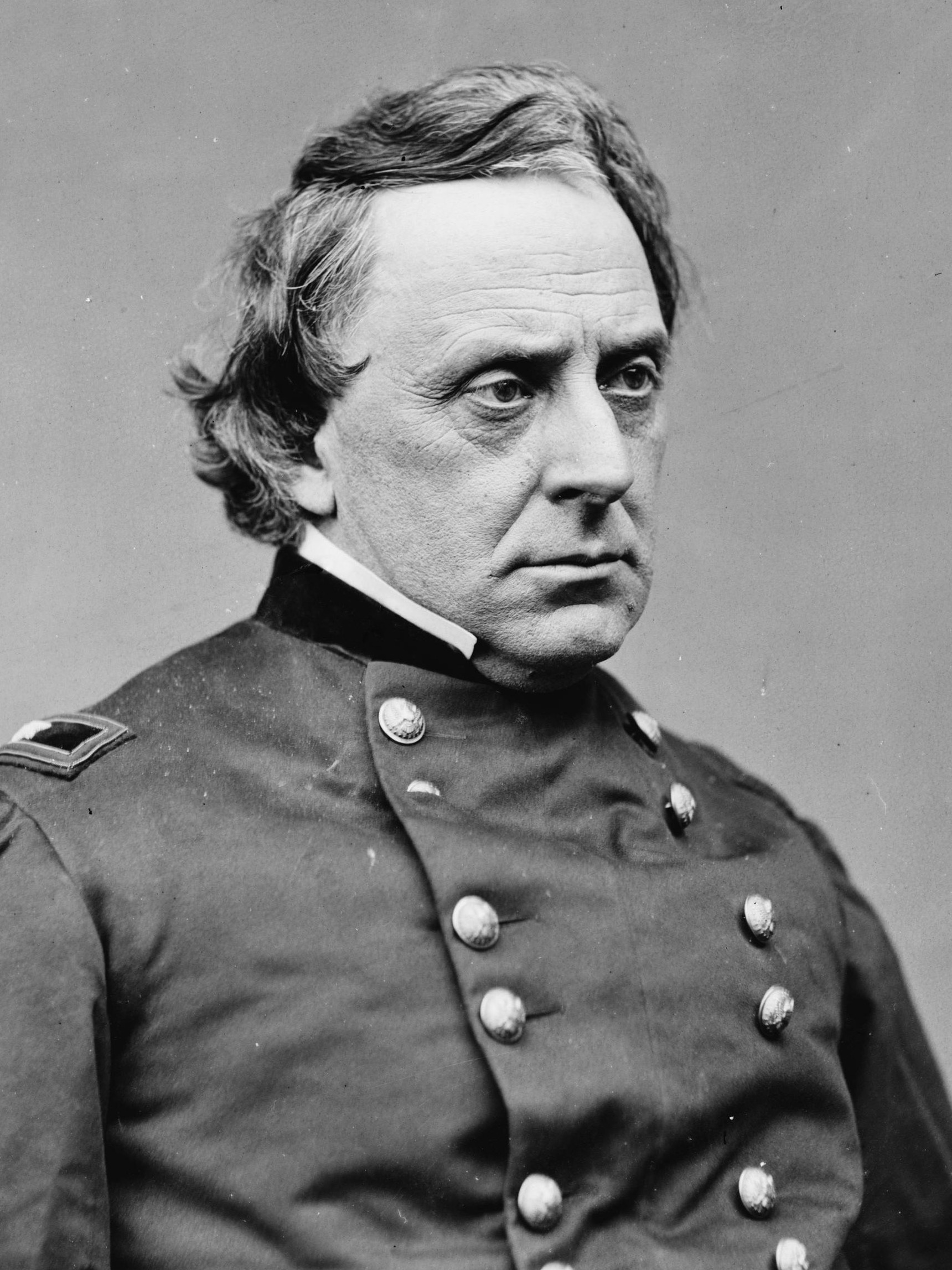

United States Senator from New Hampshire
- In office March 4, 1889 – June 18, 1889
- Appointed by: Charles H. Sawyer
- Preceded by: William E. Chandler
- Succeeded by: William E. Chandler

Member of the U.S. House of Representatives from New Hampshire's 1st district
- In office March 4, 1865 – March 3, 1867
- Preceded by: Daniel Marcy
- Succeeded by: Jacob Hart Ela
- In office March 4, 1859 – March 3, 1863
- Preceded by: James Pike
- Succeeded by: Daniel Marcy

Member of the New Hampshire House of Representatives
- In office 1845–1849; 1872–1873; 1876–1878

Personal details
- Born: August 20, 1811 Orford, New Hampshire
- Died: July 3, 1890 (aged 78) Exeter, New Hampshire
- Party: Republican
- Education: Dartmouth College; Harvard University
- Occupation: Soldier, politician

Military service
- Allegiance: United States of America; Union
- Branch/service: United States Army; Union Army
- Years of service: 1861 - 1865
- Rank: Brigadier general
- Commands: 2nd New Hampshire Volunteer Infantry
- Battles/wars: American Civil War

Gilman Marston (August 20, 1811 – July 3, 1890) was a United States representative, Senator, and United States Army general from New Hampshire.

== Early life ==
Marston was born in Orford, New Hampshire. He graduated from Dartmouth College in 1837 and from the law department of Harvard University in 1840. He was admitted to the bar and commenced practice in Exeter, New Hampshire, in 1841 and was a member of the New Hampshire House of Representatives from 1845 to 1849. He was a delegate to the State constitutional convention of 1850.

Marston was elected as a Republican to the Thirty-sixth and Thirty-seventh Congresses (March 4, 1859 – March 3, 1863). He was a strong supporter of President Abraham Lincoln and the war effort.

== Civil War ==
Marston served in the Union Army during the Civil War. He first saw combat as colonel of the 2nd New Hampshire Volunteer Infantry during the First Battle of Bull Run in July 1861. His arm was shattered, but he refused an amputation. After he recovered, he fought in the Peninsula Campaign, Second Battle of Bull Run, and Battle of Fredericksburg.

Marston was promoted to brigadier general of U.S. volunteers, effective November 29, 1862. Prior to the Chancellorsville campaign, he was relieved from duty with the Army of the Potomac and assigned to the defenses of Washington where he returned to his seat in Congress. After Gettysburg, Marston was directed to establish a prison camp in Maryland, which later became known as Point Lookout. The area was designated the District of Saint Mary's under the overall command of Maj. Gen. Benjamin Butler. In 1864, he commanded a brigade in Maj. Gen. W.F. "Baldy" Smith's XVIII Corps during the Bermuda Hundred Campaign. He took part in a disastrous assault on Cold Harbor, where his brigade suffered heavy casualties. During the Union assaults on Petersburg, Gilman assumed command of the 1st Division in the XVIII Corps on the last day of battle. Thereafter he commanded the Union troops on the north side of the James River with his headquarters located at Fort Pocahontas. Occasionally he returned to command of the 1st Division, including a brief stint during the Second Battle of Fair Oaks. Having been re-elected to Congress he resigned 1865, whereupon he received the thanks of the state of New Hampshire.

== U.S. Congress ==
Marston was elected to the Thirty-ninth Congress (March 4, 1865–March 3, 1867) and in 1870 declined the Governorship of Idaho Territory. In 1872, 1873, and 1876 to 1878, he was again a member of the State house of representatives. He was an unsuccessful candidate for election in 1876 to the Forty-fifth Congress and was a delegate to the State constitutional convention of 1876.

On March 4, 1889, Marston was appointed to the U.S. Senate to fill the vacancy in the term commencing on that date and served until June 18, 1889, when a successor was elected. He died in Exeter in 1890; interment was in Exeter Cemetery.

== See also ==
- List of American Civil War generals (Union)

U.S. Senate
Preceded by William E. Chandler	U.S. senator (Class 2) from New Hampshire; 1889; Served alongside: Henry W. Blair	Succeeded by William E. Chandler
U.S. House of Representatives
Preceded by James Pike	U.S. Representative for the 1st District of New Hampshire; March 4, 1859 – March 3, 1863	Succeeded by Daniel Marcy
Preceded by Daniel Marcy	U.S. Representative for the 1st District of New Hampshire; March 4, 1865 – March 3, 1867	Succeeded by Jacob Hart Ela
