= 1st New Hampshire Light Artillery Battery =

1st New Hampshire Light Artillery
- Active: September 21, 1861, to June 9, 1865
- Country: United States
- Allegiance: Union
- Branch: Artillery
- Equipment: 4 3 inch caliber ordnance rifles
- Engagements: Battle of Groveton; Second Battle of Bull Run; Battle of Antietam; Battle of Fredericksburg; Battle of Chancellorsville; Battle of Gettysburg; Bristoe Campaign; Mine Run Campaign; Battle of the Wilderness; Battle of Spotsylvania Court House; Battle of Totopotomoy Creek; Battle of Cold Harbor; Siege of Petersburg; Battle of Jerusalem Plank Road; First Battle of Deep Bottom; Battle of the Crater (reserve); Second Battle of Deep Bottom; Appomattox Campaign; Battle of White Oak Road; Third Battle of Petersburg; Battle of Sayler's Creek; Battle of High Bridge; Battle of Appomattox

1st New Hampshire Light Artillery was an artillery battery that served in the Union Army during the American Civil War.

== Service ==
The 1st New Hampshire Artillery was organized in Manchester, New Hampshire and mustered in on September 21, 1861, for three years service under Captain George A. Gerrish.

The battery was attached to McDowell's Division, Army of the Potomac, to March 1862. 3rd Division, I Corps, Army of the Potomac, to April 1862. Artillery, King's Division, Department of the Rappahannock, to June 1862. Artillery, 1st Division, III Corps, Army of Virginia, to September 1862. Artillery, 1st Division, I Corps, Army of the Potomac, to May 1863. 3rd Volunteer Brigade, Artillery Reserve, Army of the Potomac, to October 1863. Artillery Brigade, III Corps, Army of the Potomac, to March 1864. Artillery Brigade, II Corps, Army of the Potomac, to June 1865.

The 1st New Hampshire Artillery mustered out of service June 9, 1865.

== Detailed service ==
Left New Hampshire for Washington, D.C., November 1, 1861. Duty at Munson's Hill, defenses of Washington, D.C., until March 1862. Advance on Manassas, Va., March 10–15. Camp at Upton's Hill until April 9. Advance on Falmouth, Va., April 9–18. Occupation of Fredericksburg April 18 and duty there until May 25. McDowell's advance on Richmond May 25–29. Operations against Jackson June 1–21. Duty at Falmouth until July 28, and at Fredericksburg until August 5. Expedition to Fredericks Hall and Spotsylvania Court House August 5–8. Thornburg Mills August 5–6. Pope's Campaign in northern Virginia August 16-September 2. Fords of the Rappahannock August 21–23. Rappahannock Station August 22. Sulphur Springs August 26. Battle of Groveton August 29. Battle of Bull Run August 30. Maryland Campaign September–October. Battle of Antietam, September 16–17. Movement to Falmouth, Va., October 30-November 19. Union November 2–3. Battle of Fredericksburg, Va., December 11–15.

"Mud March" January 20–24, 1863. At Belle Plains until April. Chancellorsville Campaign April 27-May 6. Operations at Pollock's Mill Creek April 29-May 2. Fitzhugh's Crossing April 29–30. Battle of Chancellorsville May 1–5. Battle of Gettysburg, July 2–4. Funkstown, Md., July 12–18. Bristoe Campaign October 9–22. Advance to line of the Rappahannock November 7–8. Kelly's Ford November 7. Brandy Station November 8. Mine Run Campaign November 26-December 2. Payne's Farm November 27.

At Brandy Station until April 1864. Demonstration on the Rapidan February 6–7. Campaign from the Rapidan to the James River May 3-June 12. Battles of the Wilderness May 5–7; Spotsylvania May 8–12; Po River May 10; Spotsylvania Court House May 12–21. Assault on the Salient, "Bloody Angle," May 12. North Anna River May 23–26. Totopotomoy May 28–31. Cold Harbor June 1–12. Before Petersburg June 16–19. Siege of Petersburg June 16, 1864, to April 2, 1865. Jerusalem Plank Road June 22–23. Deep Bottom July 27–28. Mine Explosion, Petersburg, July 30 (reserve). Demonstration north of the James August 13–20. Strawberry Plains, Deep Bottom, August 14–18. Duty in the trenches before Petersburg August 20–30. At Fort Hill until September 7. At Battery 18 until October 22. Non-veterans mustered out September 28, 1864. Battery attached to 1st New Hampshire Heavy Artillery as Company M November 5, 1864, but remained detached as a light battery in the field.

Duty in the trenches before Petersburg until March 1865. Appomattox Campaign March 28-April 9. White Oak Road March 30–31. Sutherland Station and fall of Petersburg April 2. Sayler's Creek April 6. Farmville and High Bridge April 7. Appomattox Court House April 9. Surrender of Lee and his army. Moved to Washington, D.C., May 1–12. Grand Review of the Armies May 23.

== Casualties ==
The battery lost a total of 12 men during service; 6 enlisted men killed or mortally wounded, 6 enlisted men died of disease.

== Commanders ==
- Captain George A. Gerrish 1st Commander Co A
- Captain Frederick M. Edgell 2nd Commander Co A till enlistment ran out
- Captain George K. Dakin Final Commander Co M Reinlistment

== See also ==
- List of New Hampshire Civil War units
- New Hampshire in the American Civil War
