= Joseph H. Potter =

American soldier and general

Joseph Haydn Potter
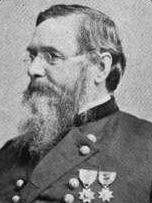
- Joseph Haydn Potter
- Born: October 12, 1822; Concord, New Hampshire, US
- Died: December 1, 1892 (aged 70); Columbus, Ohio, US
- Burial place: Green Lawn Cemetery, Columbus, Ohio
- Military career
- Allegiance: United States; Union
- Branch: United States Army; Union Army
- Service years: 1843–1886
- Rank: Brigadier General
- Unit: Army of the James
- Commands: brigades in the XVIII and XXIV corps
- Conflicts: Mexican-American War; American Civil War: Maryland Campaign; Battle of Fredericksburg; Battle of Chancellorsville; Battle of Chaffin's Farm; Siege of Petersburg

Joseph Haydn Potter (October 12, 1822 – December 1, 1892) was a career soldier from the state of New Hampshire who served as a general in the Union Army during the American Civil War. He was twice a prisoner of war and was cited for gallantry on multiple occasions.

== Early life and career ==
Potter born in Concord, New Hampshire, on October 12, 1822. He was appointed to the United States Military Academy in 1839. He graduated in 1843, ranking just beneath classmate Ulysses S. Grant. For the next two years, as a second lieutenant, Potter was engaged in garrison duty. He participated in the military occupation of Texas and the Mexican War. He helped in the defense of Fort Brown and was wounded in the Battle of Monterey.

Subsequently he performed recruiting duty back in the East. Potter was promoted to first lieutenant in the 7th U.S. Infantry on October 30, 1847, and served on garrison duty until 1856, becoming a captain on January 9 of that year. Potter accompanied the Utah expedition in 1858-60 and was subsequently sent back to Texas on outpost duty.

== Civil War service ==
When war erupted in early 1861, Potter was still stationed in Texas. He was captured by Confederates at St. Augustine Springs on July 27, 1861, and was held as a prisoner of war for more than a year. He was finally exchanged on August 2, 1862. He returned to active duty and was assigned command of the 12th New Hampshire Infantry as a colonel in the volunteer Union Army while retaining his rank of captain in the Regular Army.

Potter took part in the Maryland Campaign with the Army of the Potomac and subsequently participated in the Rappahannock Campaign that led to the Battle of Fredericksburg. During the 1863 Battle of Chancellorsville, he was wounded and captured again. His services in these two battles earned him brevet ranks of lieutenant colonel and colonel respectively in the Regular Army. While still a prisoner of war, he was also promoted to the full rank of major in the regular army on July 4, 1863.

He was exchanged in October 1863, and was then the assistant provost marshal general of Ohio until September 1864, when he was assigned a brigade in the XVIII Corps of the Army of the James. He commanded the Bermuda Hundred front during the attack on Fort Harrison.

Afterward, Potter assumed command of a brigade in the XXIV Corps and led it during the Siege of Petersburg. He continued at the front as chief of staff of the XXIV Corps from January 1865, until the surrender of General Robert E. Lee. He received the brevet of brigadier general in the United States Army on March 13, 1865, and promotion to brigadier general of volunteers on May 1, 1865.

== Postbellum career ==
Potter was mustered out of the volunteer service on January 15, 1866, and appointed as the lieutenant colonel of the 30th Infantry Regiment on July 28 that same year. After holding various posts in the West, he was promoted to the full rank of colonel on December 11, 1873, commanding the 24th Infantry Regiment .

From July 1, 1877, to July 1, 1881, Potter was the governor of the soldiers' home in Washington, D. C. He then returned to his regiment. On April 1, 1886, he was made brigadier general in the Regular Army. He then had command of the Department of the Missouri until his retirement on October 12, 1886.

Potter was a member of both the Aztec Club of 1847 and the Military Order of the Loyal Legion of the United States.

Potter retired to Columbus, Ohio, where he died in 1892.

In 1903 Battery Potter at Fort Hancock, New Jersey was named for him.

== See also ==
- List of American Civil War generals (Union)
