= John W. Boutwell =

American soldier who received the Medal of Honor

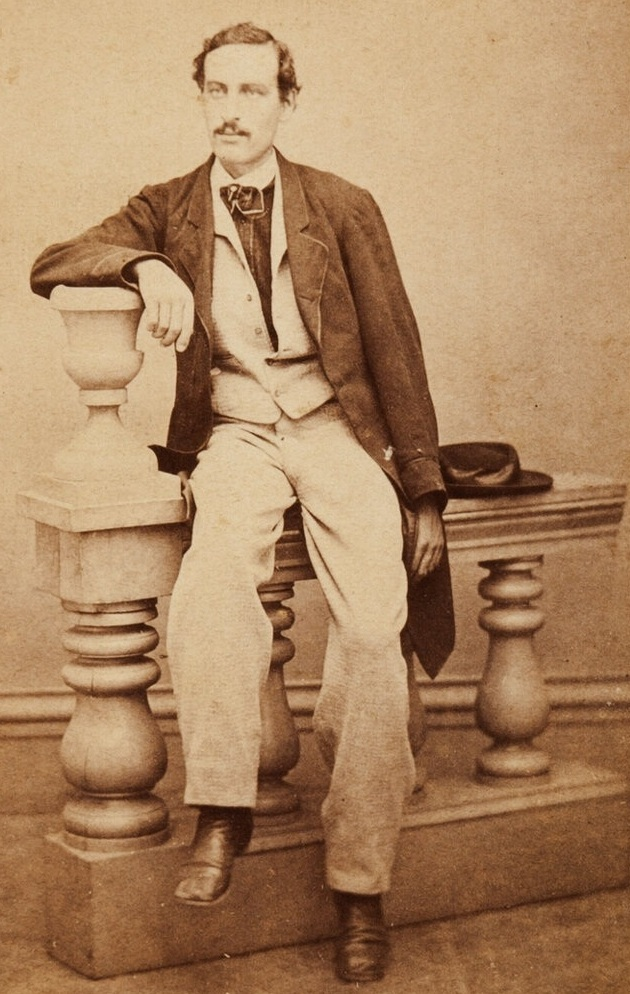
- Carte-de-visite photo of Boutwell in 1865. H. O. Bly (Hanover, New Hampshire), photographer
- Born: August 3, 1845; Hanover, New Hampshire, US
- Died: December 11, 1920 (aged 75); Newark, New Jersey, US
- Burial place: Arlington National Cemetery
- Military career
- Allegiance: Union (American Civil War)
- Branch: Union Army
- Rank: Private
- Unit: 18th Regiment New Hampshire Volunteer Infantry
- Conflicts: Third Battle of Petersburg
- Awards: Medal of Honor

John W. Boutwell (August 3, 1845 – December 11, 1920) was an American soldier who received the Medal of Honor for valor during the American Civil War.

== Biography ==
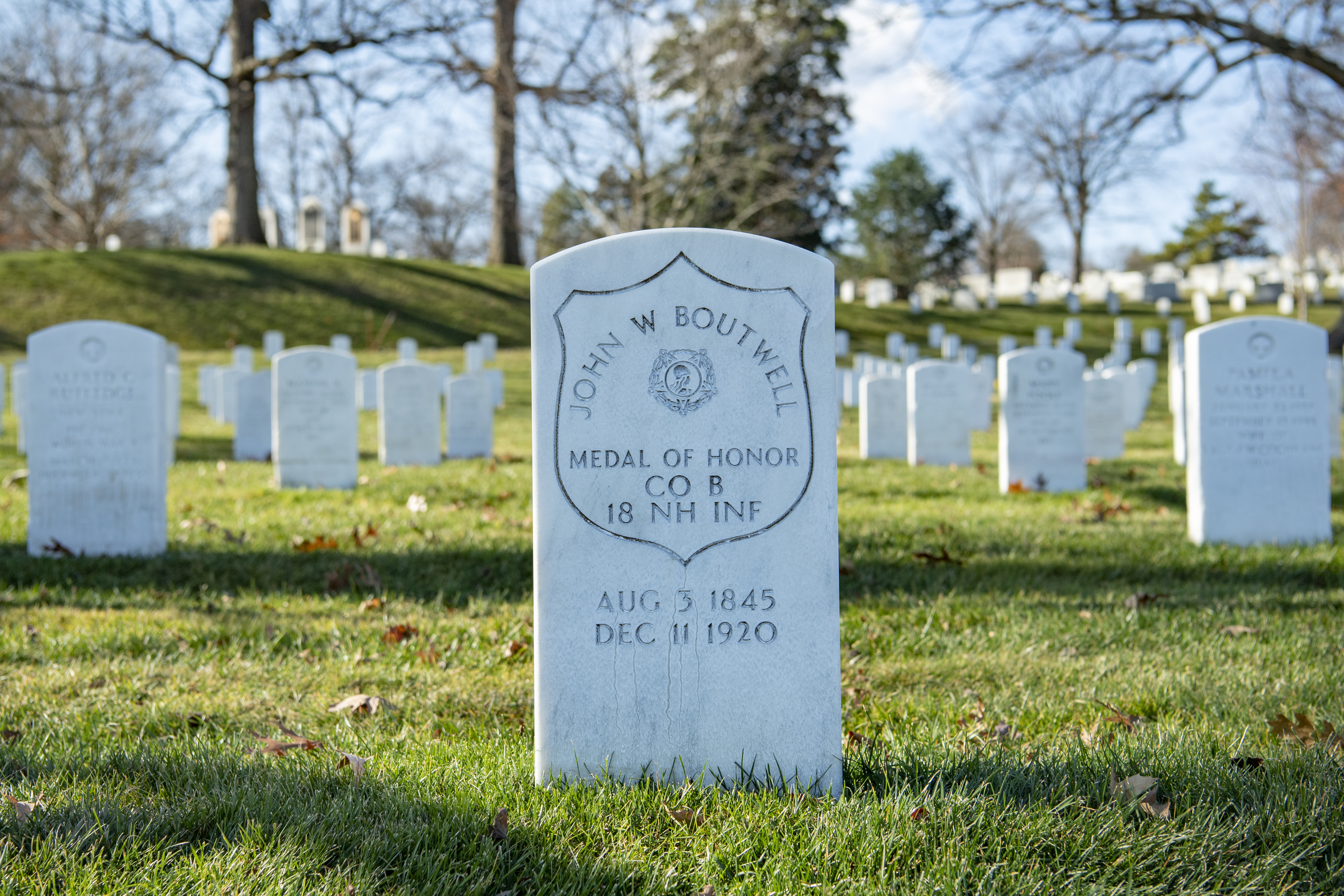
Boutwell's gravestone at Arlington National Cemetery

Boutwell served in the Union Army in the 18th New Hampshire Infantry Regiment. He received the Medal of Honor on April 2, 1865, for his actions at the Third Battle of Petersburg.

== Medal of Honor citation ==
Citation:

Brought off from the picket line, under heavy fire, a comrade who had been shot through both legs.

== See also ==
- List of American Civil War Medal of Honor recipients: A-F
