= James Pike (politician) =

American politician (1818–1895)

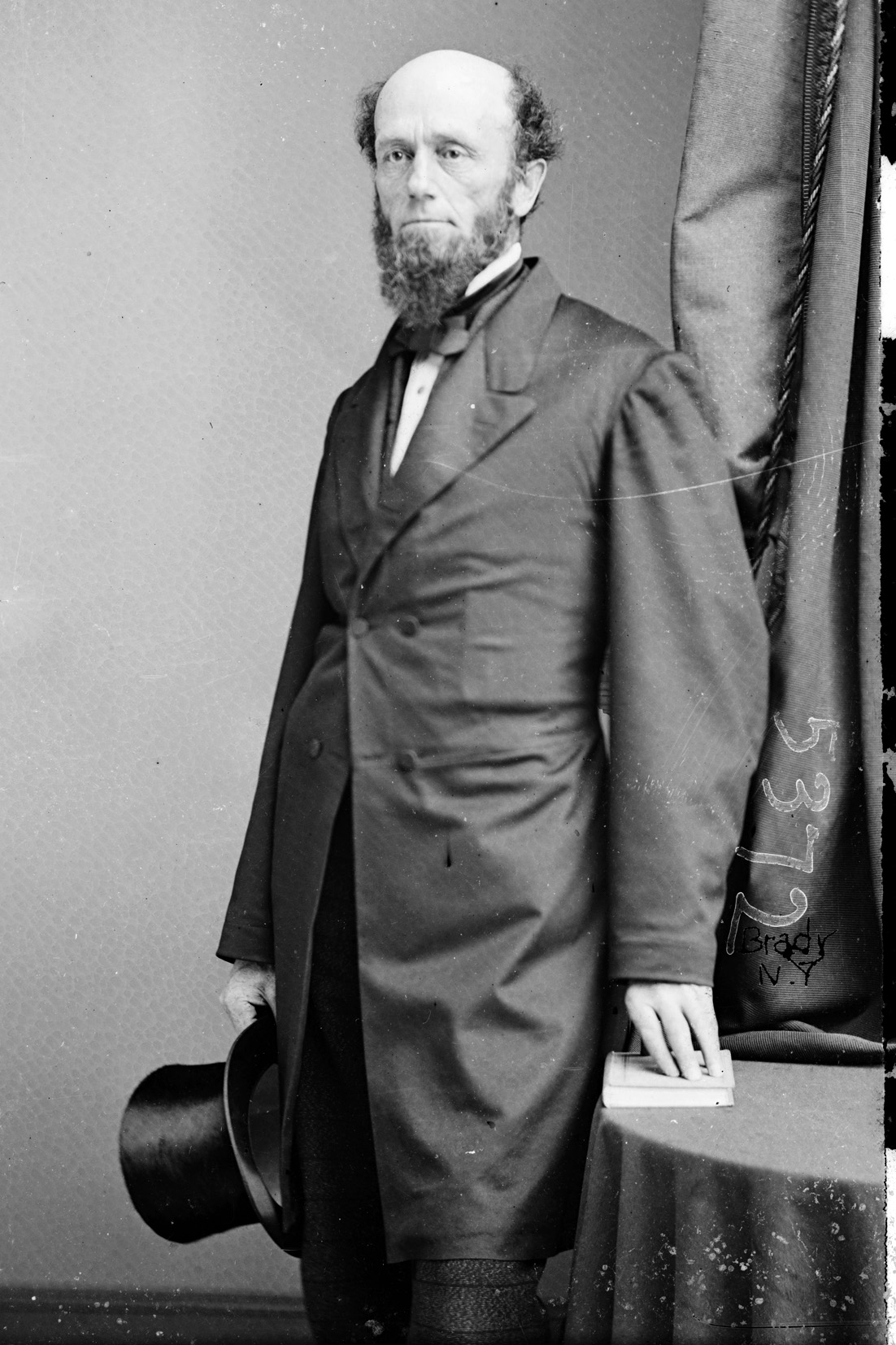

Member of the U.S. House of Representatives from New Hampshire's 1st district
- In office March 4, 1855 – March 3, 1859
- Preceded by: George W. Kittredge
- Succeeded by: Gilman Marston

Personal details
- Born: November 10, 1818 Salisbury, Massachusetts
- Died: July 26, 1895 (aged 76) Newfields, New Hampshire
- Resting place: Locust Cemetery
- Party: Know Nothing
- Other political affiliations: Republican
- Education: Wesleyan University

Military service
- Allegiance: United States of America; Union
- Branch/service: United States Army; Union Army
- Years of service: November 1, 1862 – August 20, 1863
- Rank: Colonel
- Unit: 16th New Hampshire Volunteer Infantry
- Battles/wars: American Civil War

James Pike (November 10, 1818 – July 26, 1895) was a U.S. representative from New Hampshire and served with the Union Army during the American Civil War.

== Biography ==
Born in Salisbury, Massachusetts, Pike pursued classical studies, then studied theology at Wesleyan University in Connecticut from 1837 to 1839. He served as a minister from 1841 to 1854. He moved to Pembroke, New Hampshire, in 1854. Pike was elected as an American Party candidate to the Thirty-fourth Congress and reelected as a Republican to the Thirty-fifth Congress (March 4, 1855 - March 3, 1859). He was not a candidate for renomination in 1858. During the Civil War, Pike served as colonel of the 16th New Hampshire Volunteer Infantry, from November 1, 1862, to August 20, 1863. He fought in the Siege of Port Hudson in 1863. He was an unsuccessful candidate for governor of New Hampshire in 1871. He resumed preaching and became presiding elder of the Dover district. He discontinued active duties in 1886 and lived in retirement until his death in Newfields, New Hampshire, July 26, 1895. He was interred in Locust Cemetery.

Party political offices
Preceded by Onslow Stearns	Republican nominee for Governor of New Hampshire; 1871	Succeeded by Ezekiel A. Straw
U.S. House of Representatives
Preceded by George W. Kittredge	Member of the U.S. House of Representatives from New Hampshire's 1st congressional district March 4, 1853 – March 3, 1859	Succeeded by Gilman Marston
