= Daniel Marcy =

American politician from New Hampshire

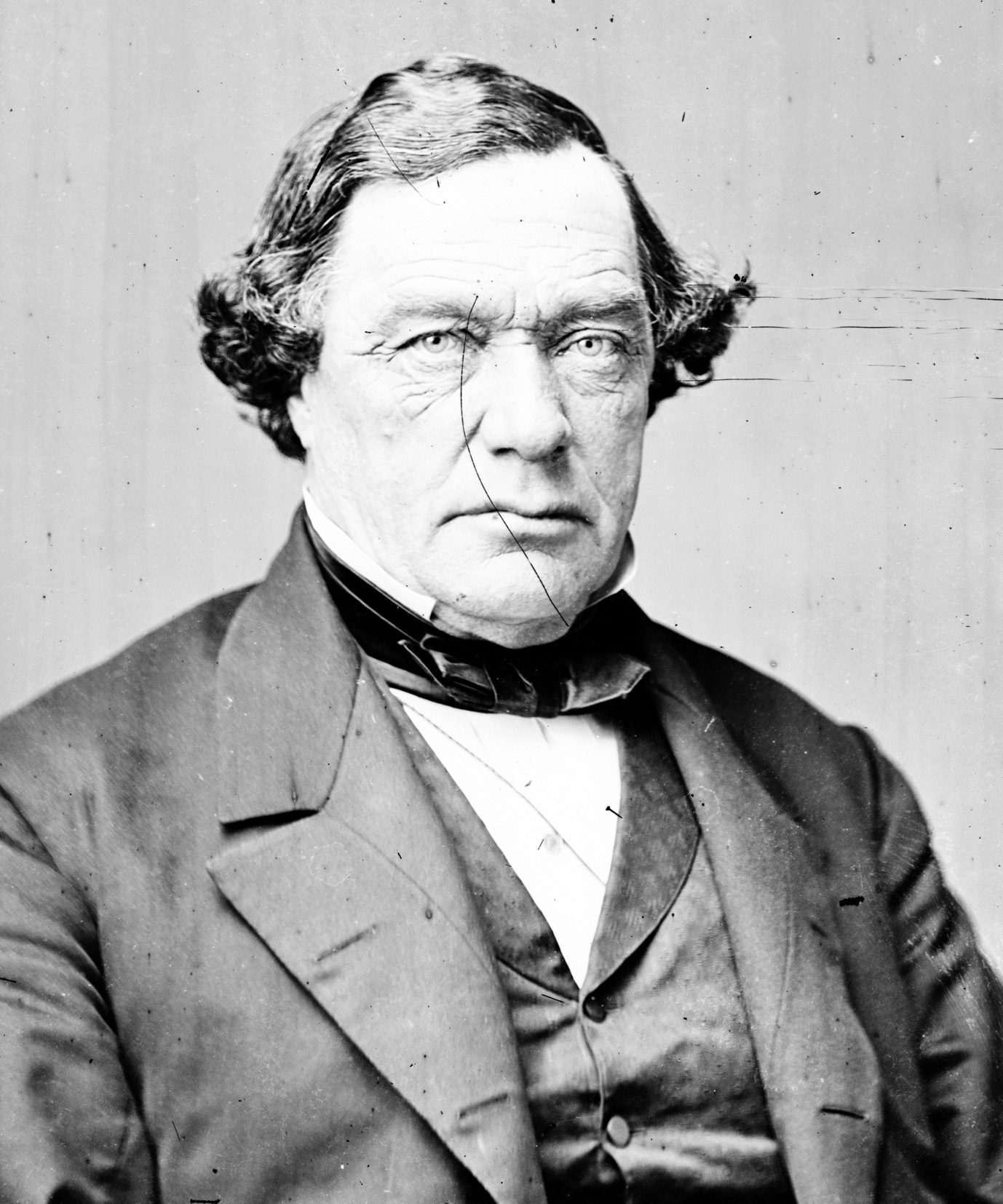
- Marcy in 1850

Member of the U.S. House of Representatives from New Hampshire's 1st district
- In office March 4, 1863 – March 3, 1865
- Preceded by: Gilman Marston
- Succeeded by: Gilman Marston

Member of the New Hampshire Senate
- In office 1857-1858

Member of the New Hampshire House of Representatives
- In office 1854-1857

Personal details
- Born: November 7, 1809 Portsmouth, New Hampshire, U.S.
- Died: November 3, 1893 (aged 83) Portsmouth, New Hampshire, U.S.
- Party: Democratic

Daniel Marcy (November 7, 1809 – November 3, 1893) was a United States representative from New Hampshire. He was born in Portsmouth, New Hampshire where he attended the common schools. Becoming a sailor, he followed the sea and later engaged in shipbuilding.

Marcy was a member of the New Hampshire House of Representatives 1854–1857. He also served in the New Hampshire Senate in 1857 and 1858. He was an unsuccessful candidate for election to the Thirty-sixth Congress in 1858 and to the Thirty-seventh Congress in 1860. However, he was elected as a Democrat to the Thirty-eighth Congress (March 4, 1863 – March 3, 1865). He was an unsuccessful candidate for reelection in 1864 to the Thirty-ninth Congress. After leaving Congress, he again served in the New Hampshire Senate in 1871 and 1872. He died in Portsmouth in 1893 and was buried in the Proprietors’ Burying Ground.

Party political offices
Preceded by Hiram R. Roberts	Democratic nominee for Governor of New Hampshire; 1876, 1877	Succeeded by Frank A. McKean
U.S. House of Representatives
Preceded by Gilman Marston	Member of the U.S. House of Representatives from New Hampshire's 1st congressional district March 4, 1863 – March 3, 1865	Succeeded by Gilman Marston
