= Skirmish of the Brick Church =

Battle of the American Civil War

Battle of the Brick Church
- Part of the American Civil War
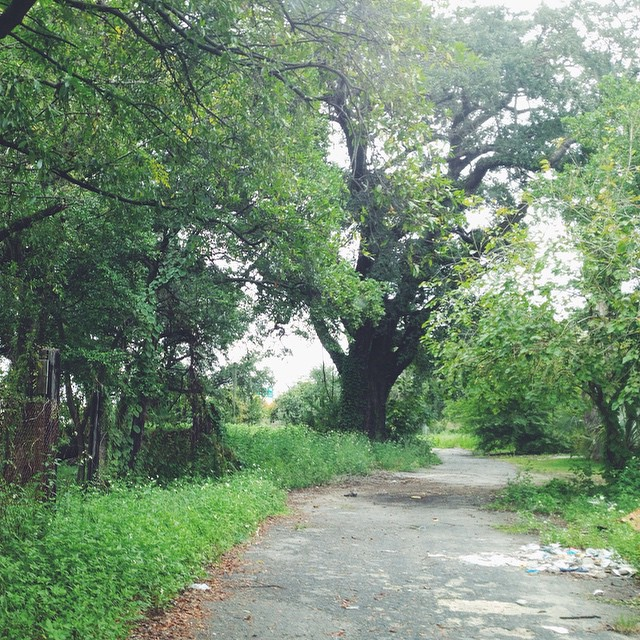
- The location where the brick church once stood
Date	March 24, 1862
Location	Duval County, Florida now in Jacksonville 30°19′57″N 81°40′31″W
Result	Confederate tactical victory

Belligerents
United States (Union)	(Confederate States of America) CSA (Confederacy)

Commanders and leaders
Colonel Louis Bell	Colonel W. S. Dilworth Lieutenant Strange †

Strength
7	30

Casualties and losses
7 (4 killed 3 captured/missing)	3 (1killed 2 captured)

The Skirmish of the Brick Church was the first land engagement in Northeast Florida between the Union Army and Confederate Army of the American Civil War. It was fought on March 24, 1862 and resulted in the first Confederate victory in Florida.

== Background ==
In early 1862 the coastal defenses of Florida were abandoned. At this point several warships of the Union Navy sailed down the St. Johns River to Jacksonville, Florida.

== Skirmish ==
When Confederates heard the Federal forces landed in Jacksonville Colonel Davis sent a detachment of cavalry to Camp Langford near Jacksonville. Confederate scouts reported that Federals established a strong picket outpost at a brick church. Colonel W. S. Dilworth was conducting raids and attacking Union pickets to annoy the enemy. One attack on a Union picket erupted into a battle at a brick church. Lieutenant Strange of the Third Florida at the brick church was ordered to capture the Federals and if possible with no bloodshed. Thirty Confederates encountered five Federals in the vicinity of the brick church. The Federals were behind tombstones, trees and in the church yard shooting at the advancing Confederate force. The five Federals were forced to retreat inside the church only to have the Confederates storm the church. Two Federals in the church were killed and the remaining three surrendered.

Further Confederate advance was halted by return fire from the 4th New Hampshire Volunteer Infantry with one Confederate killed and two taken prisoner.

Lacking forces to engage the Union forces directly, Colonel Dilworth continued hit-and-run raids.

== Aftermath ==
After the Federals retreated to their ships they decided to torch the city. Any trace of the brick church has been lost but the church cemetery still remains. The battle, though small, had a number of firsts for the civil war. It was the first Confederate victory in Florida and it was where the first Confederate officer was killed in Florida.
