= Fort Clifton (Virginia) =

Archaeological site in Virginia, United States

- Fort Clifton Archeological Site
- U.S. National Register of Historic Places
- Virginia Landmarks Register
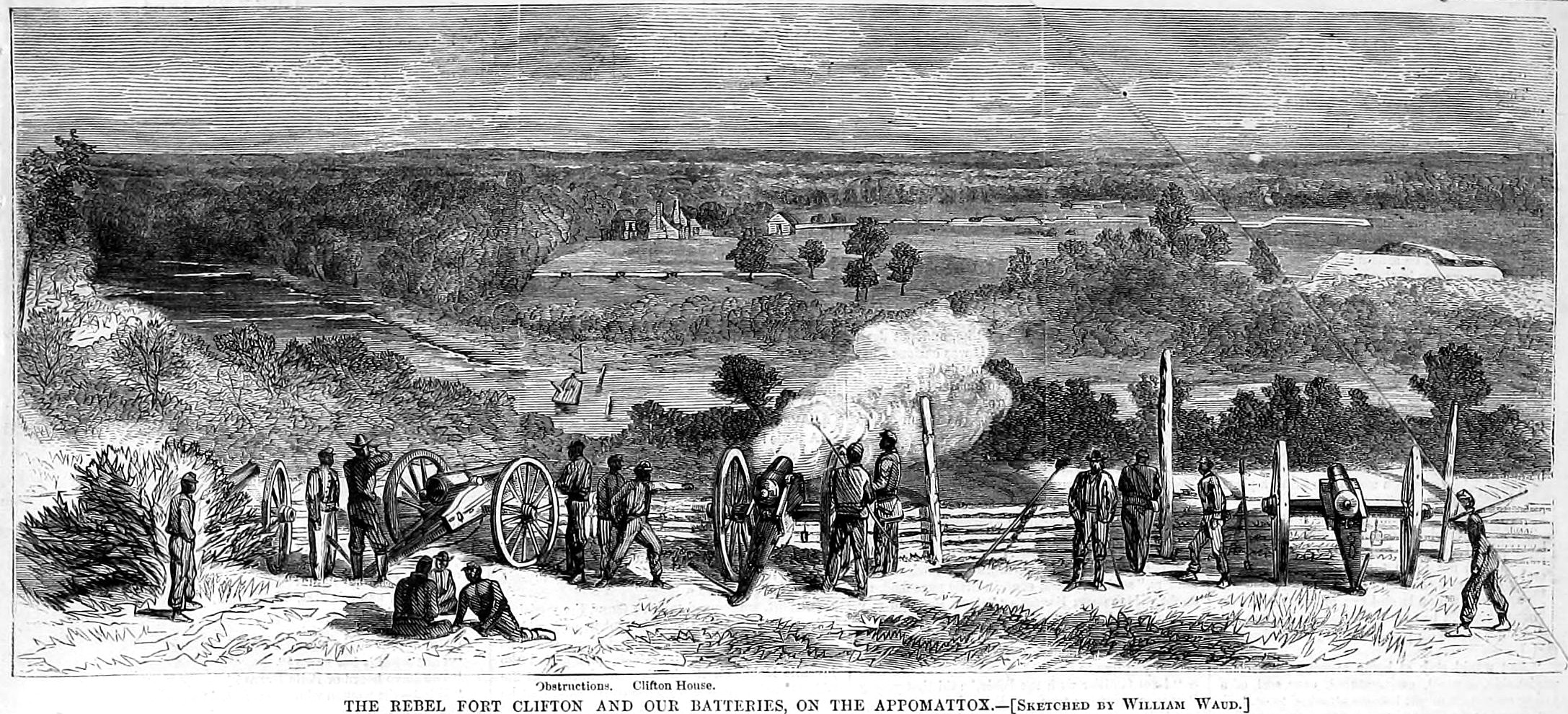
- Fort Clifton (background) as viewed from an opposing Union battery (foreground)

- Location within Virginia Location within the United States
- Location: 100 Brockwell Lane, Colonial Heights, Virginia
- Coordinates: 37°16′54″N 77°21′58″W
- Area: 7.4 acres (3.0 ha)
- Built: 1864
- NRHP reference No.: 81000639
- VLR No.: 106-0005

Significant dates
- Added to NRHP: February 3, 1981
- Designated VLR: October 21, 1980

Fort Clifton Archeological Site is a historic American Civil War fort archaeological site located at Fort Clifton Park, Colonial Heights, Virginia. The park is the site of Fort Clifton on the Appomattox River where five Union ships sailed on Confederate troops on June 11, 1864. The Confederate Battery, with cannon emplacements, remained in Confederate hands as the cannons drove the Union attackers away. The park has earthworks that criss-cross the property. Fort Clifton Park has hiking trails and Civil War campaign signage on site.

It was listed on the National Register of Historic Places in 1981.
