= USCGC Boutwell =

USCGC Boutwell may refer to the following ships of the United States Coast Guard:

- USCGC Boutwell (WSC-130), was an Active-class patrol boat operated by the United States Coast Guard
- USCGC Boutwell (WHEC-719), was a Hamilton-class cutter operated from 1968 to 2016.

== See also ==
- USRC Boutwell (1873), was an iron-hulled revenue cutter of the United States Revenue Cutter Service operated from 1873 to 1907.
