= Boutwell Creek =

Stream in Clearwater County, Minnesota, U.S.

Coordinates: 47°12′27″N 95°13′12″W

Boutwell Creek is a stream in Clearwater County, Minnesota, in the United States.

Boutwell Creek was named for William Thurston Boutwell, a minister who accompanied explorer Henry Schoolcraft on one of his expeditions.

== See also ==
- List of rivers of Minnesota
