= Blossom Hill and Calvary Cemeteries =

- U.S. National Register of Historic Places
- U.S. Historic district
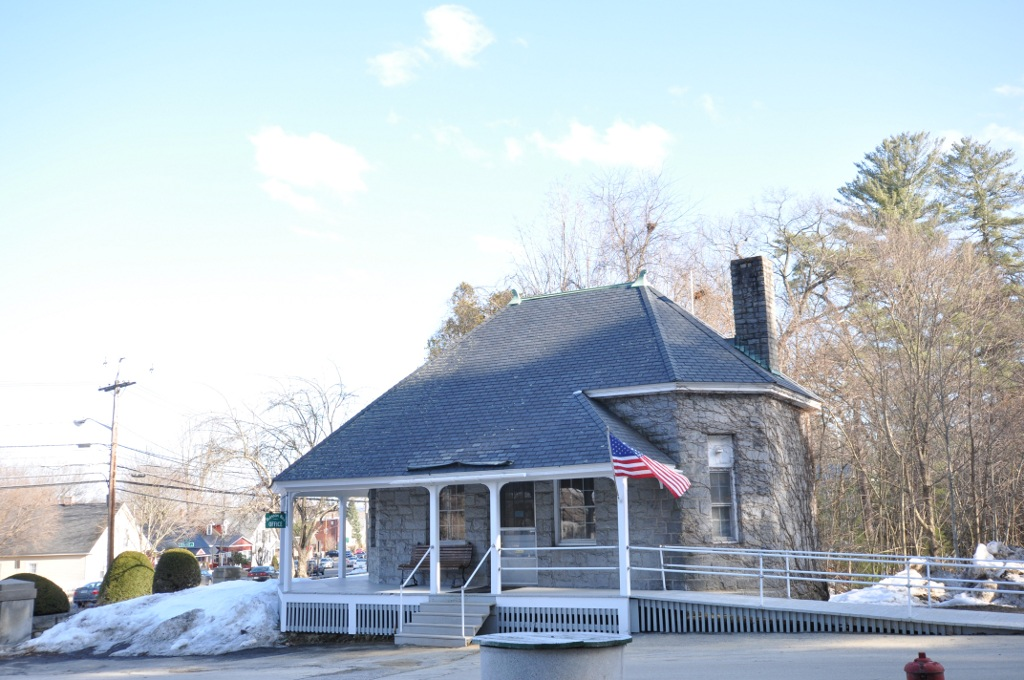
- Entry house

- Location within New Hampshire Location within the United States
- Location: North State Street, Concord, New Hampshire
- Coordinates: 43°13′19″N 71°33′13″W
- Area: 75 acres (30 ha)
- Built: 1860; 1875
- Architect: Briggs, John C.
- Architectural style: Rural cemetery
- NRHP reference No.: 10000891
- Added to NRHP: December 15, 2010

The Blossom Hill and Calvary Cemeteries are a pair of adjacent municipally owned cemeteries on North State Street in Concord, New Hampshire. Blossom Hill, a 19th-century cemetery designed in the then-fashionable rural cemetery tradition, was always a municipal cemetery; the Calvary Cemetery was established by the Roman Catholic Diocese of Manchester, whose oversight area includes all of New Hampshire. The Calvary Cemetery was taken over by the city in 1996; its earliest marked grave dates to 1857. The cemeteries were listed on the National Register of Historic Places in 2010.

== Blossom Hill Cemetery ==
Blossom Hill Cemetery is about 61 acres (25 ha) in size, with a roughly trapezoidal shape on the west side of North State Street, about 0.2 miles (0.32 km) north of the commercial downtown area of the city. There are two entrances, one near the southern end and one near the northern end. The terrain generally slopes upward toward the west, with the oldest developed portions of the cemetery at its highest points. The circulating pattern consists of winding paved and gravel roads, laid out to follow contours of the terrain, and grassy paths between the rows of gravesites. Special areas of the cemetery include the Beth Jacob Cemetery, laid out in 1948 for Jewish interments, and a section containing a memorial to the Grand Army of the Republic, honoring the city's Civil War dead.

The cemetery was founded in 1860 and was the city's second, after the Old North Cemetery. It was designed by John C. Briggs, who died at the age of 41 and is buried here. The cemetery is the final resting place of city and state leaders, including four governors.

== Calvary Cemetery ==
Calvary Cemetery occupies 14.4 acres (5.8 ha), immediately adjacent to and north of Blossom Hill. The two cemeteries now have integrated landscaping, Calvary having been managed and maintained by the city since its founding. It was established in 1875, a decade after the founding of St. John the Evangelist Church. Its burials include the first Catholic priest to serve Concord, Rev. John O'Reilly, who died in 1855 and whose remains were moved here from Manchester in the 1890s, and Rev. John Barry, under whose auspices the cemetery was established.

== See also ==
- National Register of Historic Places listings in Merrimack County, New Hampshire
