= 2nd New Hampshire Infantry Regiment =

- Active: 1861 - August 1864
- Country: United States of America
- Allegiance: New Hampshire & Union
- Type: volunteer infantry
- Size: 1,013
- Engagements: Bull Run; Williamsburg; Fair Oaks; Second Bull Run; Malvern Hill; Fredericksburg; Gettysburg; Cold Harbor

Commanders
- Notable commanders: Colonel Gilman Marston

2nd New Hampshire Infantry Regiment was the longest-serving volunteer regiment of the State of New Hampshire in the American Civil War.

== Service ==
The 2nd New Hampshire was organized in early 1861 and mustered on June 4, 1861. The 2nd NH fought from First Bull Run until the occupation of Richmond approximately four years later. The regiment was led by Colonel Gilman Marston, a future United States congressman who represented the state in the 51st Congress (1889-1891).

The 2nd New Hampshire initially wore gray uniforms with "spiketail" dress coats trimmed in red cord, and "jaunty forage caps" with "2NH" on the crown.

Of the 900 who fought in the regiment's first battle at the First Bull Run, seven were killed, 56 wounded (seven mortally), and 46 missing (many of them wounded and all of them captured by Confederates). Marston had his arm shattered and refused amputation. He went on to recover and lead the 2nd New Hampshire at the battles of Williamsburg.

The 2nd New Hampshire is notable for being the only Union infantry regiment which made extensive use of the Gardiner exploding bullets, being issued these rounds in June 1863 for their Sharps rifles. These bullets were designed to explode one to three seconds after firing, and while primarily used to destroy wagons and other equipment they could have gruesome effect when used against other soldiers. Between July 1 and October 1 the regiment fired 4,000 Gardiner rounds in target practice and 10,000 in battle.

At Gettysburg, the 2nd New Hampshire entered battle with 353 soldiers. In under three hours, 47 were killed, 136 wounded and 36 men went missing; of the 24 officers, only three were not killed or wounded. Due to their high losses, the 2nd New Hampshire was assigned to guard duty at Point Lookout, Maryland, with the 5th and 12th New Hampshire Volunteer Regiments. The 2nd New Hampshire returned to battle in time for the Battle of Cold Harbor where it suffered heavy casualties of nineteen killed and 54 wounded.

Shortly after Cold Harbor, 223 had completed their enlistments and returned home. Of the original members, 70 reenlisted and with recruits, continued to be the 2nd New Hampshire. However, many who returned home enlisted in other units. During the Civil War the regiment had 178 men killed or mortally wounded in action and another 172 deaths by disease, accidents, or as a result of being prisoners of war.

== Notable members ==
- Gilman Marston (1811–1890), congressman, senator, and US Army general
- Harriet Patience Dame (1815–1900), volunteer army nurse from April 1861 until after the war's end. She was honored as a state hero, and for her service she received a pension and an official portrait in the New Hampshire State House.
- Joab N. Patterson (1835–1922), congressman, treasurer and commander of the regiment during the Siege of Petersburg

== Flag ==
The regimental flag was made in California similar to the 1st and was presented to the regiment on April 22, 1862. The flag was dubbed the: "California Flag."

== See also ==
- List of New Hampshire Civil War Units
- Hartshorn Memorial Cannon (South Lyndeborough, New Hampshire)
