= White House, Virginia =

Settlement in New Kent County, Virginia, United States

Coordinates: 37°34′20″N 77°2′30″W

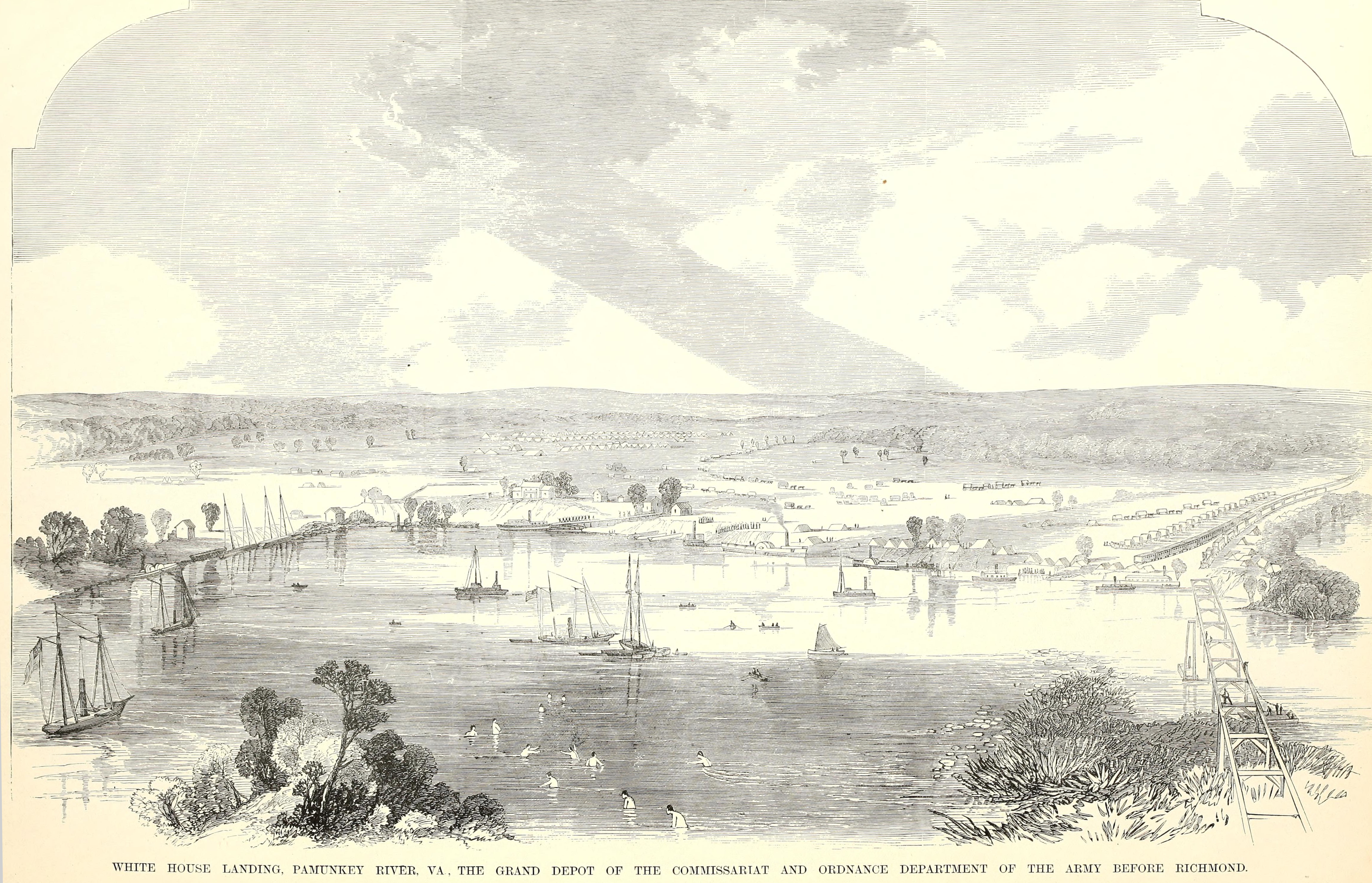
White House, Virginia in 1861, Frank Leslie. White House Plantation is pictured on the far shore, left of center (above the docked steamboat).

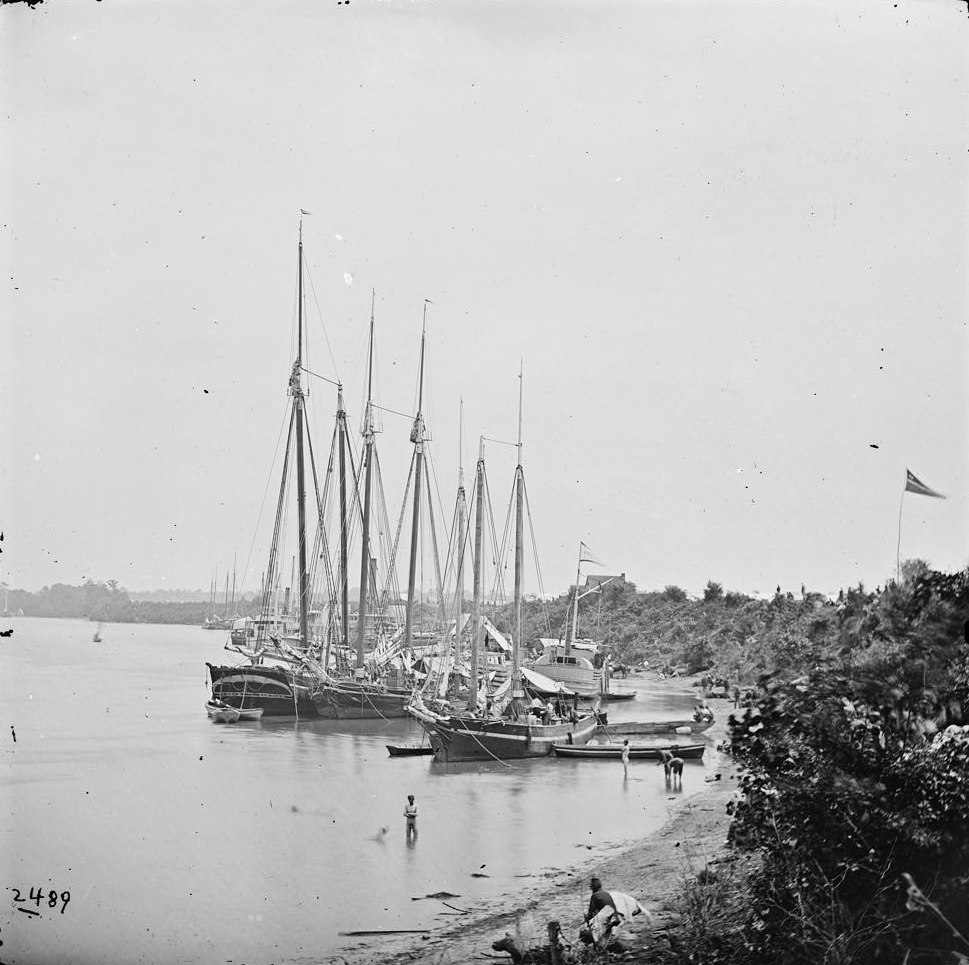
White House Landing, 1862

White House is an unincorporated community in New Kent County, Virginia, United States, on the south shore of the Pamunkey River.

In the 18th century, White House Plantation, for which the area is named, was the home of Martha Dandridge Custis, the widow of Daniel Parke Custis. Colonel George Washington courted his future wife here, and they were married in the parlor of the plantation house in 1759.

During the Civil War, nearby White House Landing on the river was the site of a major Union Army supply base in 1862 during the Peninsula Campaign, and again in 1864 during the Overland Campaign.

At White House, the Richmond and York River Railroad, which was completed in 1861 between Richmond and West Point, crossed the Pamunkey River. The railroad is now part of the Norfolk Southern rail system.
