= Battle of Swift Creek =

Battle of the American Civil War

- Part of American Civil War
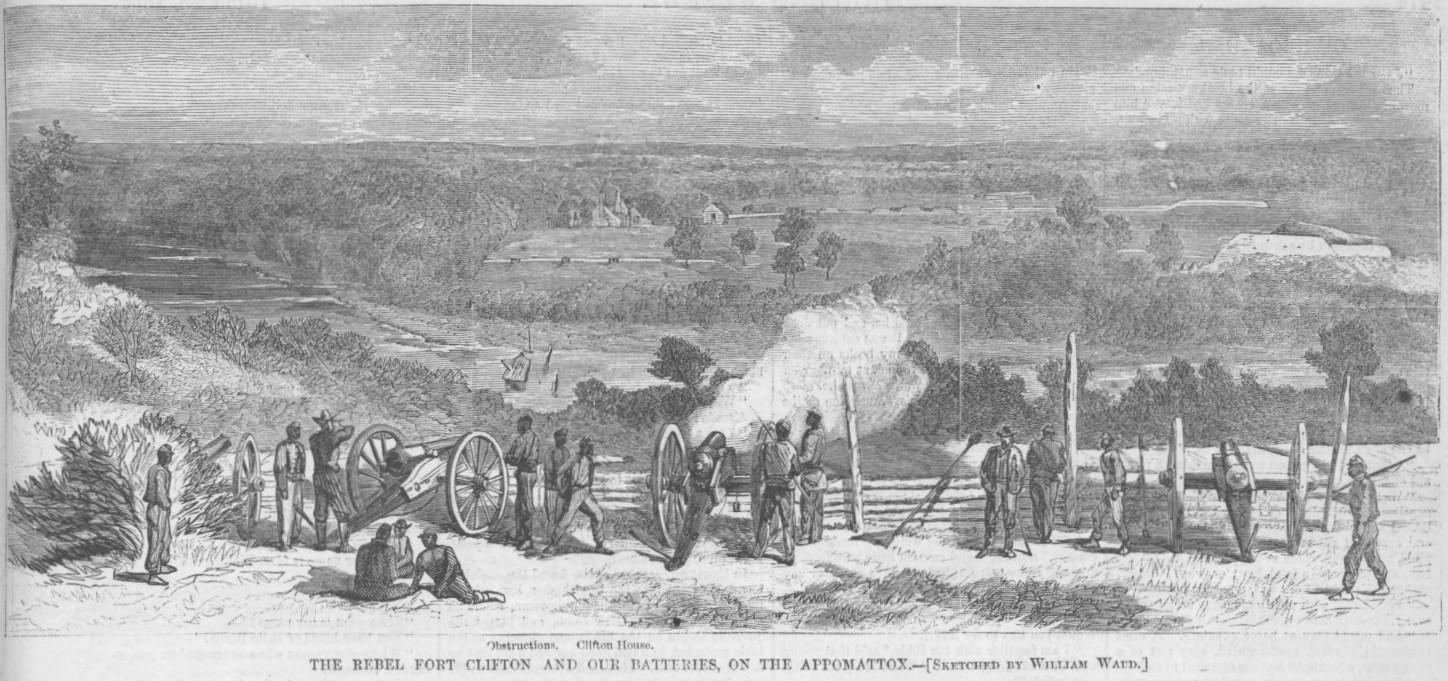
- The Rebel Fort Clifton and our batteries on the Appomattox (illustration by W. Waud in Harper's Weekly, 1864)
Date	May 9, 1864
Location	Chesterfield County, Virginia 37°17′10″N 77°24′43″W
Result	Inconclusive

Belligerents
United States (Union)	(Confederate States of America) CSA (Confederacy)

Commanders and leaders
Benjamin Butler	P. G. T. Beauregard

Strength
5 gunboats 14,000	4,200

Casualties and losses
- 990
- Location within Virginia

The Battle of Swift Creek or Arrowfield Church was fought on May 9, 1864, between Union and Confederate forces during the American Civil War. Union forces were only partially successful: they inflicted damage on the local railroad, but further advance was halted.

== Description ==
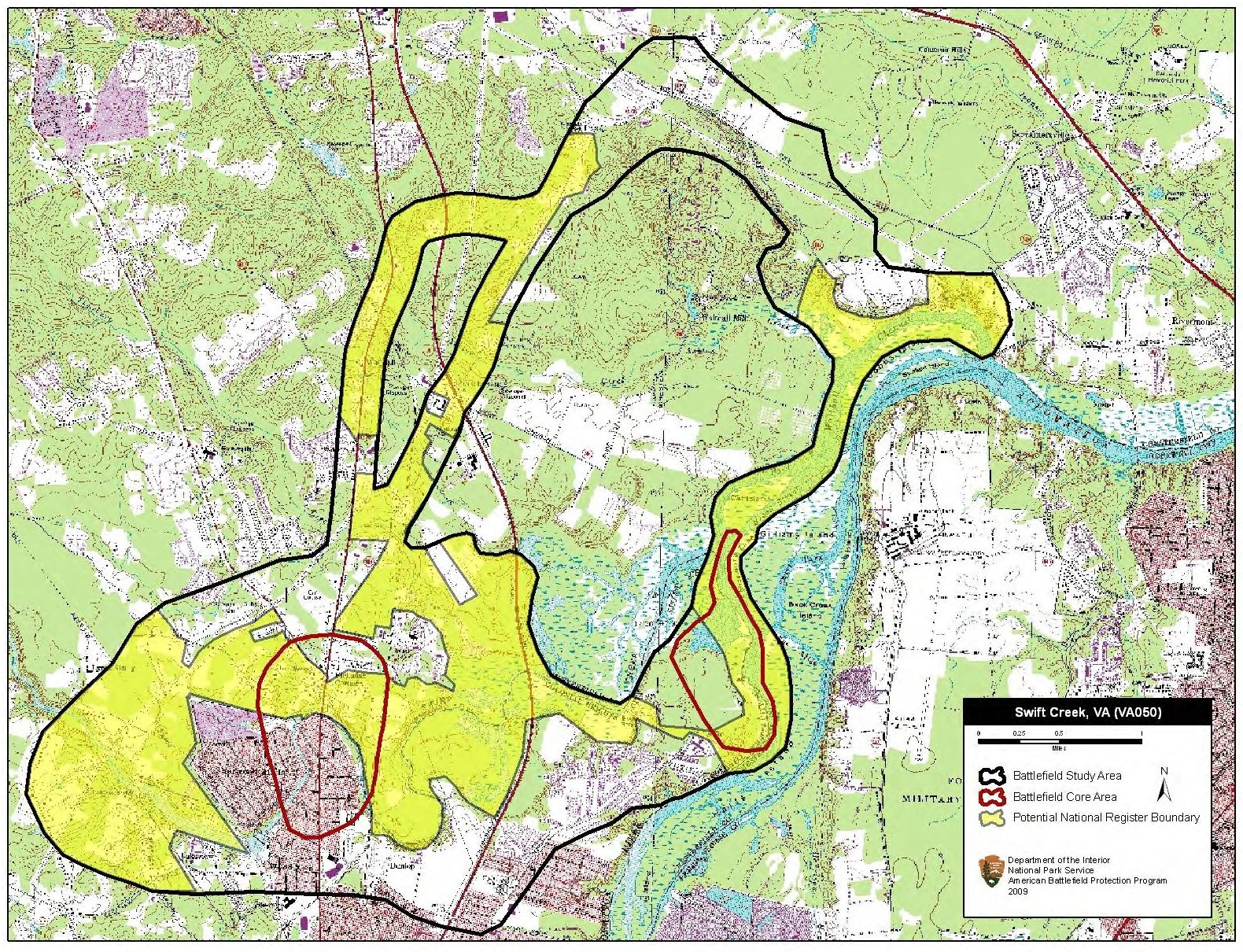
Map of Swift Creek Battlefield core and study areas by the American Battlefield Protection Program.

On May 9, Maj. Gen. Benjamin Butler made a thrust toward Petersburg and was met by Bushrod Johnson's Division at Swift Creek. A premature Confederate attack at Arrowfield Church was driven back with heavy losses, but Union forces did not follow up. After skirmishing, Butler seemed content to tear up the railroad tracks and did not press the defenders. In conjunction with the advance to Swift Creek, five Federal gunboats steamed up the Appomattox River to bombard Fort Clifton, while Edward W. Hincks's U.S. Colored Troops infantry division struggled through marshy ground from the land side. The gunboats were quickly driven off, and the infantry attack was abandoned.

== Sources ==
- National Park Service Battle Summary
- CWSAC Report Update
- City of Colonial Heights, Virginia
- E-History
