= New Hampshire in the American Civil War =

New Hampshire was a member of the Union during the American Civil War.

The state gave soldiers, money, and supplies to the Union Army. It sent 31,657 enlisted men and 836 officers, of whom about 20% were killed in action or died from disease or accident.

== Soldiers ==
In January 1861, as news arrived of secession of states from the Union, top officials were secretly meeting with Governor John A. Andrew of Massachusetts to coordinate plans in case the war came. Plans were made to rush militia units to Washington in an emergency.

New Hampshire fielded 31,657 enlisted men and 836 officers. The state provided eighteen volunteer infantry regiments (thirteen of which were raised in 1861 in response to Lincoln's call to arms), three rifle regiments (who served in the 1st United States Sharpshooters and 2nd United States Sharpshooters), one cavalry battalion (the 1st New Hampshire Volunteer Cavalry, which was attached to the 1st New England Volunteer Cavalry), and two artillery units (the 1st New Hampshire Light Battery and 1st New Hampshire Heavy Artillery), as well as 3000 men for the Navy and Marine Corps.

Among the most celebrated of New Hampshire's units was the 5th New Hampshire Volunteer Infantry, commanded by Colonel Edward Ephraim Cross. Called the "Fighting Fifth" in newspaper accounts, the regiment was considered among the Union's best both during the war (Major General Winfield Scott called the regiment "refined gold" in 1863) and by historians afterward. The Civil War veteran and early Civil War historian William F. Fox determined that this regiment had the highest number of battle-related deaths of any Union regiment. The 20th-century historian Bruce Catton said that the Fifth New Hampshire was "one of the best combat units in the army" and that Cross was "an uncommonly talented regimental commander."

The critical post of state Adjutant General was held during 1861–1864 by elderly politician Anthony C. Colby (1792–1873) and his son Daniel E. Colby (1816–1891). They were patriotic, but were overwhelmed with the complexity of their duties. The state had no track of men who enlisted after 1861; no personnel records or information on volunteers, substitutes, or draftees. There was no inventory of weaponry and supplies. Nathaniel Head (1828–1883) took over in 1864, obtained an adequate budget and office staff, and reconstructed the missing paperwork. As a result, widows, orphans, and disabled veterans received the postwar payments they had earned.

== Politics ==
New Hampshire's governor for the first two months of the Civil War was Ichabod Goodwin. A former New Hampshire legislator, Goodwin raised ten regiments in response to Lincoln's call for troops.

Nathaniel S. Berry defeated Goodwin for the Republican Party nomination for governor in the 1861 New Hampshire gubernatorial election and served from June 1861 until June 1863.

Serving during the American Civil War, Berry was a strong supporter of the Union. During his governorship, New Hampshire provided to the Union Army fifteen infantry regiments, three companies of sharpshooters, four companies of cavalry and one company of heavy artillery.

In June 1862, Abraham Lincoln desired to issue a call for more recruits to join the Union Army, but hesitated because he wanted to demonstrate that the war effort still had popular support, following a perceived ebb in Union state morale as the result of several battlefield reverses. Berry was one of the organizers of an effort to send Lincoln a letter from the state governors to inform him that the states would respond positively if he issued a call for additional troops. Now able to demonstrate popular support for continuing the war effort, Lincoln requested the states to provide additional soldiers.

Berry was also an active participant in the September 1862 War Governors' Conference. During this meeting, Union state governors indicated their continued support for Lincoln's wartime policies, including the Emancipation Proclamation Lincoln indicated he intended to issue at an opportune moment.

Joseph A. Gilmore was elected governor after Berry declined to run for reelection in 1863. He served from June 1863 to June 1865.

== See also ==
- List of New Hampshire Civil War units
- History of New Hampshire
- Category:People of New Hampshire in the American Civil War
