= Battle of Mine Run order of battle: Union =

The following units and commanders fought in the Mine Run campaign of the American Civil War on the Union side. The Confederate order of battle is shown separately.

== Military rank abbreviations used ==
- MG = Major General
- BG = Brigadier General
- Col = Colonel
- Ltc = Lieutenant Colonel
- Maj = Major
- Cpt = Captain
- Lt = Lieutenant
- Sgt = Sergeant

== Army of the Potomac ==
MG George G. Meade, Commanding

=== General staff and headquarters ===
- Chief of Staff: MG Andrew A. Humphreys
- Chief of Artillery: BG Henry J. Hunt
- Assistant Adjutant General: BG Seth Williams
- Chief Quartermaster: BG Rufus Ingalls
- Provost Marshal General: BG Marsena R. Patrick
  - 1st Maryland Cavalry : Maj Charles H. Russell
  - 80th New York (20th Militia): Ltc Jacob B. Hardenbergh
  - 93rd New York: Ltc Benjamin C. Butler
  - 1st US Cavalry (squadron): Cpt Isaac R. Dunkelberger
- Engineer Brigade: BG Henry W. Benham
  - 15th New York (battalion): Maj William A. Ketchum
  - 50th New York: Col William H. Pettes
  - U.S. Battalion: Cpt George H. Mendell
- Ordnance Detachment: Lt Morris Schaff
- Guards and Orderlies
  - Oneida (New York) Cavalry: Cpt Daniel P. Mann
- Signal Corps: Cpt Lemuel B. Norton

=== I Corps ===
- MG John Newton
- Escort: 4th and 16th Pennsylvania Cavalry (detachments): Cpt Robert A. Robinson

Division	Brigade	Regiments and others
First Division: BG Lysander Cutler	1st Brigade ("Iron Brigade"): Col William W. Robinson	19th Indiana: Col Samuel J. Williams; 24th Michigan: Cpt Albert M. Edwards; 1st New York Sharpshooters (battalion): Cpt Joseph S. Arnold; 2nd Wisconsin: Ltc John Mansfield; 6th Wisconsin: Col Edward S. Bragg; 7th Wisconsin: Maj Mark Finnicum
First Division: BG Lysander Cutler	2nd Brigade: BG James C. Rice	7th Indiana: Col Ira G. Grover; 76th New York: Ltc John E. Cook; 84th New York ("14th Brooklyn Militia"): Col Edward B. Fowler; 95th New York: Maj Edward Pye; 147th New York: Maj George Harney; 56th Pennsylvania: Col John William Hofmann
Second Division: BG John C. Robinson	1st Brigade: Col Samuel H. Leonard	16th Maine: Ltc Augustus B. Farnham; 13th Massachusetts: Ltc N. Walter Batchelder; 39th Massachusetts: Col Phineas Stearns Davis; 94th New York: Maj Samuel A. Moffett; 104th New York: Col Gilbert G. Prey; 107th Pennsylvania: Col Thomas F. McCoy
Second Division: BG John C. Robinson	2nd Brigade: BG Henry Baxter	12th Massachusetts: Maj Benjamin F. Cook; 83rd New York (9th Militia): Col Joseph A. Moesch; 97th New York: Maj Charles B. Northrup; 11th Pennsylvania: Col Richard Coulter; 88th Pennsylvania: Cpt John S. Steeple; 90th Pennsylvania: Maj Alfred J. Sellers
Third Division: BG John R. Kenly	1st Brigade: Col Chapman Biddle	121st Pennsylvania: Ltc Alexander Biddle; 142nd Pennsylvania: Ltc Alfred. B. McCalmont
Third Division: BG John R. Kenly	2nd Brigade: Col Langhorne Wister	143rd Pennsylvania: Col Edmund L. Dana; 149th Pennsylvania: Ltc Walton Dwight; 150th Pennsylvania: Maj Thomas Chamberlain
Third Division: BG John R. Kenly	3rd Brigade: Col Nathan T. Dushane	1st Maryland: Ltc John W. Wilson; 4th Maryland: Col Richard N. Bowerman; 7th Maryland: Ltc Charles E. Phelps; 8th Maryland: Col Andrew W. Denison
	Artillery Brigade: Col Charles S. Wainwright	5th Maine Light: Cpt Greenlief T. Stevens; Maryland Light, Battery A: Cpt James H. Rigby; 1st New York Light, Batteries H: Cpt Charles E. Mink; 1st New York Light, Battery E & Battery L: Cpt Gilbert H. Reynolds; 1st Pennsylvania Light, Battery B: Cpt James H. Cooper; 4th US, Battery B: Lt James Stewart

=== II Corps ===
- MG Gouverneur K. Warren
- Escort: 10th New York Cavalry, Company M and 13th Pennsylvania Cavalry, Company G: Lt Robert Brown

Division	Brigade	Regiments and others
First Division: BG John C. Caldwell	1st Brigade: Col Nelson A. Miles	26th Michigan: Col Judson S. Farrar; 61st New York: Ltc K. Oscar Broady; 81st Pennsylvania: Col H. Boyd McKeen; 140th Pennsylvania: Col John Fraser
First Division: BG John C. Caldwell	2nd Brigade ("Irish Brigade"): Col Patrick Kelly	28th Massachusetts: Col Richard Byrnes; 63rd New York: Cpt Thomas Touhy; 69th New York: Cpt Richard Moroney; 88th New York: Cpt Denis F. Burke; 116th Pennsylvania: Cpt Garrett Nowlen
First Division: BG John C. Caldwell	3rd Brigade: Col James A. Beaver	52nd New York: Ltc Charles G. Freudenberg; 57th New York: Ltc Alford B. Chapman; 66th New York: Ltc John S. Hammell; 148th Pennsylvania: Ltc George A. Fairlamb
First Division: BG John C. Caldwell	4th Brigade: Col John R. Brooke	2nd Delaware: Col William P. Bailey; 64th New York: Maj Leman W. Bradley; 53rd Pennsylvania: Cpt Archibald F. Jones; 145th Pennsylvania: Col Hiram L. Brown
Second Division: BG Alexander S. Webb	1st Brigade: Col De Witt C. Baxter	19th Maine: Ltc Henry W. Cunningham; 15th Massachusetts: Ltc George C. Joslin; 1st Minnesota: Maj Mark W. Downie; 82nd New York (2nd Militia): Col Henry W. Hudson; 152nd New York: Maj Timothy O'Brien
Second Division: BG Alexander S. Webb	2nd Brigade "Philadelphia Brigade": Col Arthur F. Devereux	69th Pennsylvania: Maj James Duffie; 71st Pennsylvania: Col Richard PennSmith; 72nd Pennsylvania: Ltc Theodore Hesser; 106th Pennsylvania: Ltc William L. Curry
Second Division: BG Alexander S. Webb	3rd Brigade: Col Turner G. Morehead	19th Massachusetts: Maj Edmund Rice; 20th Massachusetts: Ltc George N. Macy; 7th Michigan: Col Norman J. Hall; 42nd New York: Ltc William A. Lynch; 59th New York: Cpt Horace P. Rugg; 1st Company Massachusetts Sharpshooters: Lt Samuel G. Gilbreth
Third Division: BG Alexander Hays	1st Brigade ("Gibraltar Brigade"): Col Samuel S. Carroll	14th Indiana: Col John Coons; 4th Ohio: Maj Gordon A. Stewart; 8th Ohio: Ltc Franklin Sawyer; 7th West Virginia (battalion): Ltc Jonathan H. Lockwood
Third Division: BG Alexander Hays	2nd Brigade: Col Thomas A. Smyth	14th Connecticut: Col Theodore G. Ellis; 1st Delaware: Ltc Daniel Woodall; 12th New Jersey: Col J. Howard Willets; 10th New York (battalion): Maj George F. Hopper; 108th New York: Col Charles J. Powers
Third Division: BG Alexander Hays	3rd Brigade: BG Joshua T. Owen	39th New York: Maj Hugo Hildebrandt; 111th New York: Col Clinton D. MacDougall; 125th New York: Col Levin Crandell; 126th New York: Col James M. Bull
	Artillery Brigade: Ltc J. Albert Monroe	1st New York Light, Battery G: Cpt Nelson Ames; Pennsylvania Light, Battery C: Cpt James Thompson; Pennsylvania Light, Battery F: Lt James Stephenson; 1st Pennsylvania Light, Batteries F and G: Lt Beldin Spence; 1st Rhode Island Light, Battery A: Cpt William A. Arnold; 1st Rhode Island Light, Battery B: Cpt Thomas Frederick Brown; 5th U.S., Battery C: Lt Richard Metcalf

=== III Corps ===
- MG William H. French

Division	Brigade	Regiments and others
First Division: MG David B. Birney	1st Brigade: Col Charles H. T. Collis	57th Pennsylvania: Col Peter Sides; 63rd Pennsylvania: Maj John A. Danks; 105th Pennsylvania: Col Calvin A. Craig; 110th Pennsylvania: Maj Levi B. Duff; 114th Pennsylvania: Maj Edward R. Bowen; 141st Pennsylvania: Col Henry J. Madill
First Division: MG David B. Birney	2nd Brigade: BG John H. H. Ward	3rd Maine: Col Moses B. Lakeman; 4th Maine: Col Elijah Walker; 20th Indiana: Col William C. L. Taylor; 86th New York: Maj Michael B. Stafford; 124th New York: Ltc Francis M. Cummins; 99th Pennsylvania: Col Asher S. Leidy; 2nd US Sharpshooters: Ltc Homer R. Stoughton
First Division: MG David B. Birney	3rd Brigade: Col P. Régis de Trobriand	17th Maine: Col George W. West; 3rd Michigan: Col Byron R. Pierce; 5th Michigan: Ltc John Pulford; 40th New York: Ltc Augustus J. Warner; 68th Pennsylvania: Ltc Jacob W. Greenawalt; 1st US Sharpshooters: Ltc Casper Trepp
Second Division: BG Henry Prince	1st Brigade: Col William E. Blaisdell	1st Massachusetts: Col Napoleon B. McLaughlen; 11th Massachusetts: Ltc Porter D. Tripp; 16th Massachusetts: Ltc Waldo Merriam; 11th New Jersey: Col Robert McAllister; 26th Pennsylvania: Ltc Robert L. Bodine; 84th Pennsylvania: Ltc Milton Opp
Second Division: BG Henry Prince	2nd Brigade ("Excelsior Brigade"): Col William R. Brewster	70th New York: Col J. Egbert Farnum; 71st New York: Col Henry L. Potter; 72nd New York: Ltc John Leonard; 73rd New York: Ltc Michael W. Burns; 74th New York: Maj Henry M. Alles; 120th New York: Maj John R. Tappen
Second Division: BG Henry Prince	3rd Brigade: BG Gershom Mott	5th New Jersey: Col William J. Sewell; 6th New Jersey: Col George C. Burling; 7th New Jersey: Maj Frederick Cooper; 8th New Jersey: Col John Ramsey; 115th Pennsylvania: Ltc John P. Dunne
Third Division: BG Joseph B. Carr	1st Brigade: BG William H. Morris	14th New Jersey: Col William Snyder Truex; 151st New York: Ltc Erwin A. Bowen; 10th Vermont: Col Albert B. Jewett
Third Division: BG Joseph B. Carr	2nd Brigade: Col Joseph W. Keifer	6th Maryland: Col John Watt Horn; 110th Ohio: Ltc William N. Foster; 122nd Ohio: Col William H. Ball; 138th Pennsylvania: Col Matthew R. McClennan (w)
Third Division: BG Joseph B. Carr	3rd Brigade: Col Benjamin F. Smith	106th New York: Ltc Charles Townsend; 126th Ohio: Maj Aaron W. Ebright; 67th Pennsylvania: Col J. F. Staunton; 87th Pennsylvania: Ltc James A. Stahle
	Artillery Brigade: Cpt George E. Randolph	4th Battery Maine Light: Cpt O'Neil W. Robinson, Jr.; 10th Massachusetts Light Battery: Cpt J. Henry Slepper; 1st Battery New Hampshire Light: Cpt Frederick M. Edgell; 1st New Jersey Light, Battery B: Cpt A. Judson Clark; 1st New York Light, Battery D: Cpt George B. Winslow; 12th Battery New York Light: Lt George K. Dauchy; 1st Rhode Island Light, Battery E: Lt John K. Bucklyn; 4th US, Battery K: Lt John W. Roder

=== V Corps ===
- MG George Sykes
- Provost Guard: 12th New York (Companies D and E): Cpt Henry W. Ryder

Division	Brigade	Regiments and others
First Division: BG Joseph J. Bartlett	1st Brigade: Col William S. Tilton	18th Massachusetts: Ltc William B. White; 22nd Massachusetts: Ltc Thomas Sherwin, Jr; 1st Michigan: Ltc William A. Throop; 118th Pennsylvania: Maj Henry O'Neill
First Division: BG Joseph J. Bartlett	2nd Brigade: Col Jacob B. Sweitzer	9th Massachusetts: Col Patrick R. Guiney; 32nd Massachusetts: Col George L. Prescott; 4th Michigan: Ltc George W. Lumbard; 62nd Pennsylvania: Ltc James C. Hull
First Division: BG Joseph J. Bartlett	3rd Brigade: Col Joseph Hayes	20th Maine: Maj Ellis Spear; 16th Michigan: Cpt George H. Swan; 44th New York: Ltc Freeman Conner; 83rd Pennsylvania: Maj William H. Lamont
Second Division: BG Romeyn B. Ayres	1st Brigade: Col Sidney Burbank	2nd U.S. (6 companies): Cpt Samuel A. McKee; 3rd U.S. (6 companies): Cpt Richard G Lay; 11th U.S.: Maj Jonathan W. Gordon; 12th U.S.: Maj Luther B. Bruen; 14th U.S.: Cpt Edward Mck. Hudson; 17th U.S.: Ltc James D. Greene
Second Division: BG Romeyn B. Ayres	3rd Brigade: BG Kenner Garrard	140th New York: Col George Ryan; 146th New York (Zouaves): Col David T. Jenkins; 91st Pennsylvania: Col Edgar M. Gregory; 155th Pennsylvania: Ltc Alfred L. Pearson
Third Division: BG Samuel W. Crawford	1st Brigade: Col William McCandless	1st Pennsylvania Reserves: Col William C. Talley; 2nd Pennsylvania Reserves: Ltc Patrick C. Donough; 6th Pennsylvania Reserves: Col Wellington H. Ent; 13th Pennsylvania Reserves: Maj William R. Hartshorne
Third Division: BG Samuel W. Crawford	3rd Brigade: Col Martin D. Hardin	5th Pennsylvania Reserves: Ltc George Dare; 9th Pennsylvania Reserves: Maj Charles Barnes; 10th Pennsylvania Reserves: Ltc James B. Knox; 11th Pennsylvania Reserves: Col Samuel M. Jackson; 12th Pennsylvania Reserves: Ltc Richard Gustin
	Artillery Brigade: Cpt Augustus Pearl Martin	3rd Battery Massachusetts Light: Lt Aaron F. Walcott; 5th Battery Massachusetts Light: Cpt Charles A. Phillips; 1st New York Light, Battery C: Cpt Almont Barnes; 1st Ohio Light, Battery L: Cpt Frank C. Gibbs; 3rd US, Batteries F and K: Lt George F. Barstow; 5th US, Battery D: Lt Benjamin F. Rittenhouse

=== VI Corps ===
- MG John Sedgwick
- Escort: 1st Vermont Cavalry (detachment): Cpt Andrew J. Grover

Division	Brigade	Regiments and others
First Division: BG Horatio G. Wright	1st Brigade (First New Jersey Brigade): BG Alfred T. A. Torbert	1st New Jersey: Ltc William Henry, Jr.; 2nd New Jersey: Col Samuel L. Buck; 3rd New Jersey: Col Henry W. Brown; 4th New Jersey: Ltc Edward L. Campbell; 15th New Jersey: Col William H. Penrose
First Division: BG Horatio G. Wright	2nd Brigade: Col Emory Upton	5th Maine: Col Clark S. Edwards; 121st New York: Maj Andrew E. Mather; 95th Pennsylvania: Ltc Edward Carroll; 96th Pennsylvania: Cpt James Russell
First Division: BG Horatio G. Wright	3rd Brigade: Col Peter C. Ellmaker	6th Maine: Maj George Fuller; 49th Pennsylvania: Ltc Thomas M. Hulings; 119th Pennsylvania: Ltc Gideon Clark; 5th Wisconsin: Ltc Theodore B. Catlin
Second Division: BG Albion P. Howe	2nd Brigade ("Vermont Brigade"): Col Lewis A. Grant	2nd Vermont: Col James H. Walbridge; 3rd Vermont: Col Thomas O. Seaver; 4th Vermont: Ltc George P. Foster; 5th Vermont: Maj Charles P. Dudley; 6th Vermont: Col Elisha L. Barney
Second Division: BG Albion P. Howe	3rd Brigade: BG Thomas H. Neill	7th Maine: Col Edwin C. Mason; 43rd New York: Col Benjamin F. Baker; 49th New York: Col Daniel D. Bidwell; 77th New York: Ltc Winsor B. French; 61st Pennsylvania: Ltc George F. Smith
Third Division: BG Henry D. Terry	1st Brigade: BG Alexander Shaler	65th New York: Col Joseph E. Hamblin; 67th New York: Col Nelson Cross; 122nd New York: Ltc Augustus Wade Dwight; 23rd Pennsylvania: Col John Ely; 82nd Pennsylvania: Col Isaac C. Bassett
Third Division: BG Henry D. Terry	2nd Brigade: BG Henry L. Eustis	7th Massachusetts: Col Thomas D. Johns; 10th Massachusetts: Ltc Joseph B. Parsons; 37th Massachusetts: Col Oliver Edwards; 2nd Rhode Island: Col Horatio Rogers, Jr
Third Division: BG Henry D. Terry	3rd Brigade: BG Frank Wheaton	62nd New York: Col David J. Nevin; 93rd Pennsylvania: Maj John I. Nevin; 98th Pennsylvania: Col John F. Ballier; 102nd Pennsylvania: Col John W. Patterson; 139th Pennsylvania: Ltc William H. Moody
	Artillery Brigade: Col Charles H. Tompkins	1st Massachusetts Light, Battery A: Cpt William H. McCartney; 1st Battery New York Light: Cpt Andrew Cowan; 3rd Battery New York Light: Cpt William A. Harn; 1st Rhode Island Light, Battery C: Cpt Richard Waterman; 1st Rhode Island Light, Battery G: Cpt George W. Adams; 4th US, Battery C: Lt Charles L. Fitzhugh; 5th US, Battery F: Lt Leonard Martin; 5th US, Battery M: Cpt James McKnight

=== Cavalry Corps ===
- MG Alfred Pleasonton
- Headquarters Guard: 6th US: Maj Robert M. Morris

Division	Brigade	Regiments and others
First Division: BG John Buford	1st Brigade: Col George H. Chapman	8th Illinois: Maj John L. Beveridge; 3rd Indiana: Maj William S. McClure; 8th New York: Maj William H. Benjamin
First Division: BG John Buford	2nd Brigade: Col Thomas Devin	4th New York: Ltc Augustus Pruyn; 6th New York: Maj William E. Beardsley; 9th New York: Ltc George S. Nichols; 17th Pennsylvania: Col Josiah H. Kellogg; 3rd West Virginia (Companies A&C): Maj Seymour B. Conger
First Division: BG John Buford	Reserve Brigade: BG Wesley Merritt	19th New York (1st Dragoons): Maj Rufus Scott; 6th Pennsylvania: Maj Henry C. Whelam; 1st US: Cpt Marcus A. Reno; 2nd US: Cpt George A. Gordon; 5th US: Cpt Abraham K. Arnold
Second Division: BG David McM. Gregg	1st Brigade: Col John P. Taylor	1st Massachusetts: Col Horace B. Sargent; 1st New Jersey: Col Percy Wyndham; 6th Ohio: Ltc William Stedman; 1st Pennsylvania: Ltc David Gardner; 3rd Pennsylvania: Col John B. McIntosh; 1st Rhode Island: Ltc John L. Thompson
Second Division: BG David McM. Gregg	2nd Brigade: Col John Irvin Gregg	1st Maine: Col Charles H. Smith; 10th New York: Maj Theodore H. Weed; 2nd Pennsylvania: Ltc Joseph P. Brinton; 4th Pennsylvania: Maj George H. Covode; 8th Pennsylvania: Col Pennock Huey; 13th Pennsylvania: Maj Michael Kerwin; 16th Pennsylvania: Maj Seth T. Kennedy
Third Division: BG George A. Custer	1st Brigade: BG Henry E. Davies, Jr.	2nd New York: Ltc Otto Harhaus; 5th New York: Maj John Hammond; 18th Pennsylvania: Col Timothy M. Bryan jr.; 1st West Virginia (10 companies): Maj Harvey Farabee
Third Division: BG George A. Custer	2nd Brigade ("Michigan Brigade"): Col Charles H. Town	1st Michigan: Maj Melvin Brewer; 5th Michigan: Cpt Stephen P. Purdy; 6th Michigan: Ltc Henry E. Thompson; 7th Michigan: Ltc Allyne C. Litchfield; 1st Vermont: Col Edward B. Sawyer
Third Division: BG George A. Custer	Headquarters Guard	1st Ohio (Companies A&C): Cpt Noah Jones
Horse Artillery	1st Brigade: Cpt James M. Robertson	6th Battery New York Light: Cpt Joseph W. Martin; 2nd US, Batteries B and L: Lt Edward Heaton; 2nd US, Battery D: Lt Edward B. Williston; 2nd US, Battery M: Lt Alexander C. M. Pennington, Jr.; 4th US, Battery A: Lt Rufus King, Jr.; 4th US, Battery E: Lt Edward Field
Horse Artillery	2nd Brigade: Cpt William M. Graham	1st US, Batteries E & G: Lt Egbert W. Olcott; 1st US, Battery I: Cpt Alanson Merwin Randol; 1st US, Battery K: Lt John Egan; 2nd US, Battery A: Lt Robert Clarke; 2nd US, Battery G: Lt William Neil Dennison; 3rd US, Battery C: Cpt Dunbar R. Ransom

=== Artillery reserve ===
- BG Robert O. Tyler

Brigade	Batteries
1st Volunteer Brigade: Ltc Freeman McGilvery	6th Maine Light: Cpt Edwin B. Dow; 9th Battery Massachusetts Light : Cpt John Bigelow; 4th Battery New York Light : Lt William T. McLean; 1st Ohio Light, Battery H: Lt George W. Norton
2nd Volunteer Brigade: Cpt Elijah D. Taft	1st Connecticut Heavy, Battery B: Cpt Albert F. Brooker; 1st Connecticut Heavy, Battery M: Cpt Franklin A. Pratt; 1st New York Light, Battery B: Cpt Albert S. Sheldon; 5th Battery New York Light: Cpt Elijah D. Taft; 1st West Virginia Light, Battery C: Cpt Wallace Hill
3rd Volunteer Brigade: Maj Robert H. Fitzhugh	1st New Jersey Light, Battery A: Cpt William Hexamer; 1st New York Light, Battery K (11th Battery New York Light attached): Lt Edward L. Bailey; 15th Battery New York Light: Cpt Patrick Hart; 1st U.S., Battery H: Lt Philip D. Mason
Ammunition Guard	6th New York Heavy Artillery: Col J. Howard Kitching
