= Faugh A Ballagh =

Irish-language battle cry

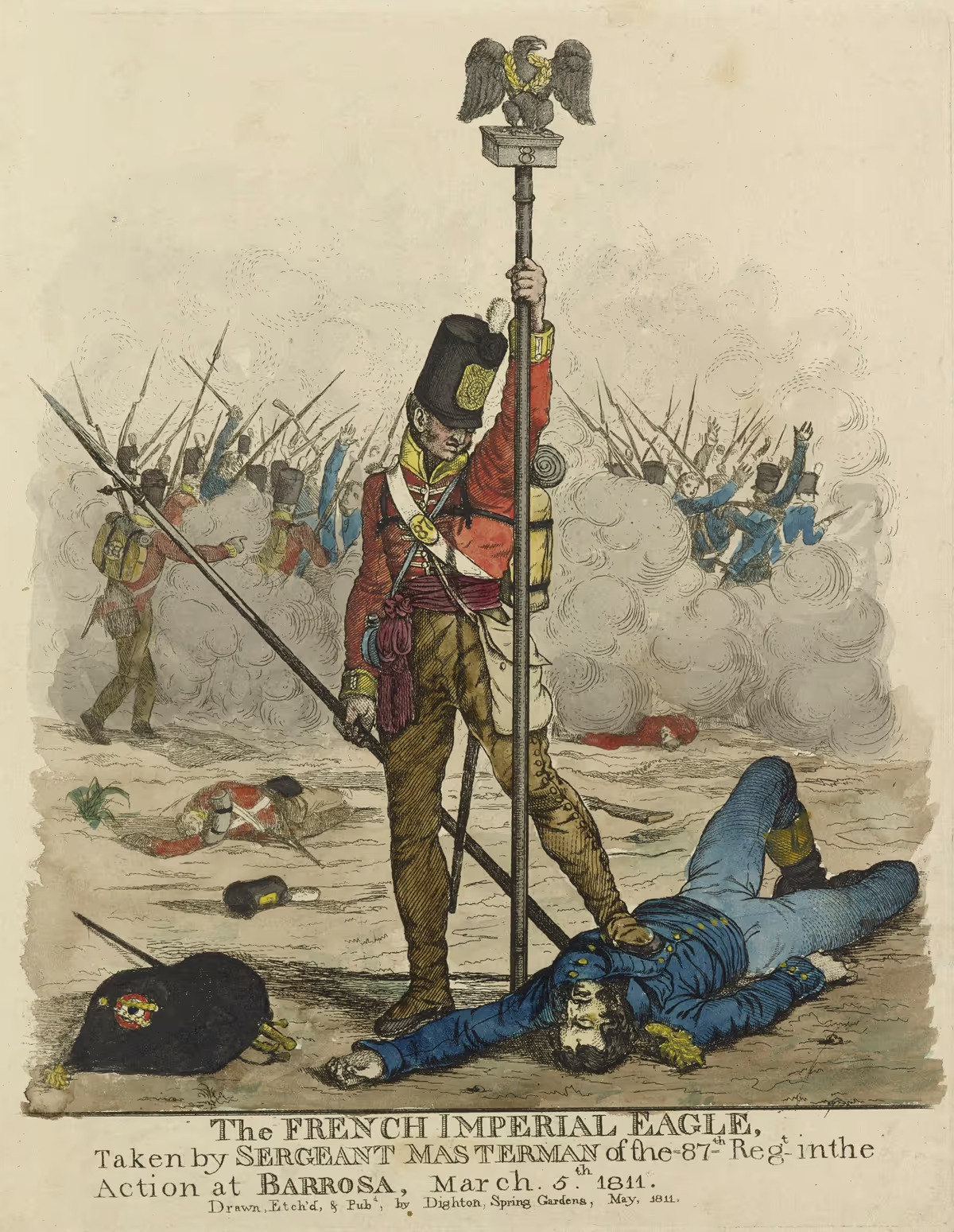
Patrick Masterson with the 8th Line Infantry Regiment's eagle

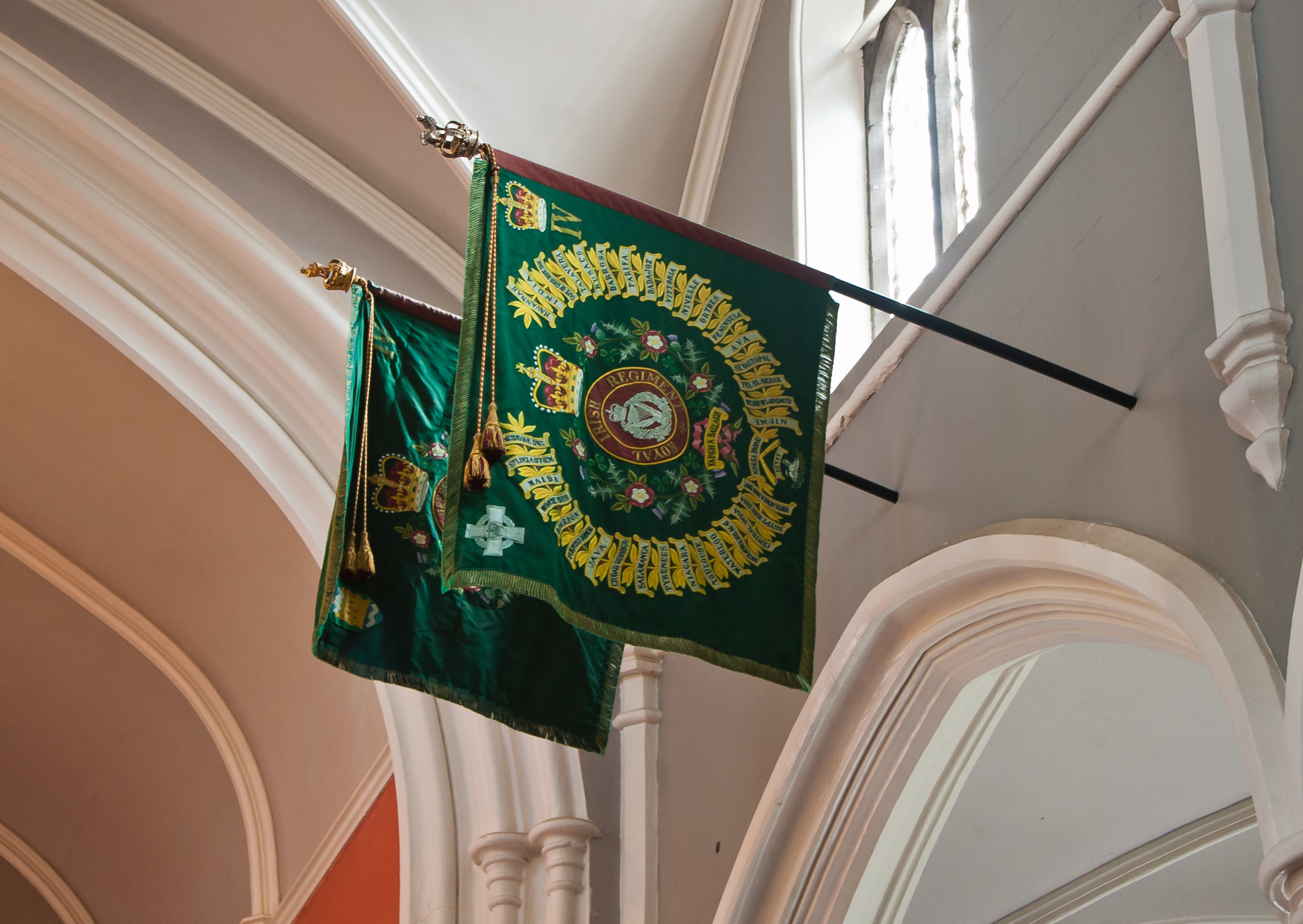
Regimental colours of the 4th Battalion Royal Irish Regiment in St. Macartin's Cathedral carrying the motto Faugh a ballagh

Faugh a ballagh (/ˌfɔːx ə ˈbæləx/ FAWKH ə BAL-əkh; also written Faugh an beallach) is a battle cry of Irish origin, meaning "clear the way". The spelling is an 18th-century anglicization of the Irish language phrase Fág an bealach [ˈfˠaːɡ ə ˈbʲalˠəx], also written Fág a' bealach. Its first recorded use as a regimental motto was by the 87th (Prince of Wales's Irish) Regiment of Foot (who later became the Royal Irish Fusiliers) in 1798. It remains the motto of the Royal Irish Regiment today.

It was adopted from the words of Sergeant Patrick Masterson at the Battle of Barrosa as he tore into the French ranks to capture the first French Imperial Eagle to be taken in the Peninsular War.

It was popularized outside Ireland during the American Civil War by the Army of the Potomac's Irish Brigade – composed of the 69th New York Volunteer Infantry (NYVI) or "Fighting 69th", the 63rd & 88th NYVI, and later the 116th Pennsylvania and 28th Massachusetts Infantry regiments. A variant transliteration of the motto, Faj an bealac! was inscribed on the regimental colors of the (Federal) 7th Missouri Volunteer Infantry, the "Irish Seventh", which fought in the Civil War's Western Theater as part of Grant and Sherman's Army of the Tennessee.

The motto was also adopted by the 55th Battalion of the Australian 5th Division during the First World War.

Since then it has appeared rather infrequently in spoken language but has enjoyed some popularity in print, appearing on mugs, T-shirts, etc.

Historian and musician Derek Warfield released a book and companion CD, which he entitled "Clear the Way", dealing with the history of the 69th Regiment.

Australian poet Banjo Paterson uses it in the poem Father Riley's Horse, claiming that the name "is French for 'Clear the course'". This is part of a running gag on language in the poem; elsewhere it claims that another Irish word, banshee, is "Spanish for an elf".

The phrase is referenced in the Dropkick Murphys' "The Legend of Finn MacCumhail" and "Heroes From Our Past"

The Irish language form of the phrase Fág an bealach was used as the title of a recent two-part documentary series on the Irish Brigade in the American Civil War broadcast on the Irish language television channel TG4.

The phrase is used in Irish Road Bowling to clear the road before a shot.

Members of Donore Harriers contest annually for the Faugh-a-Ballagh Cup which was presented by the 87th Royal Irish Fusiliers in 1907. This is a perpetual trophy for the men's club cross-country championship over 6 miles.

Dublin Rugby Club Suttonians RFC adopted the phrase as its motto.

The phrase is used by Irish WWE wrestler Sheamus.

The British Columbia Regiment uses this phrase as their regimental motto.

During the American Civil War in Company I, 8th Alabama Infantry Regiment,"The Emerald Guards". 104 out of the 109 men of the regiment were Irish born. The men wore dark green uniforms; their banner was a Confederate First National flag on one side with a full-length figure of George Washington in the center. The reverse was green, with a harp, shamrocks, and the slogans "Erin-go bragh" (Ireland forever) and "Faugh- a ballagh"- Clear the way.

There is Faugh a Ballagh Road in the Bendigo, Victoria, Australia suburb of Spring Gully.

== See also ==
- Erin go bragh
