= Peter Rafferty (Medal of Honor) =

American soldier and Medal of Honor recipient

Peter F. Rafferty
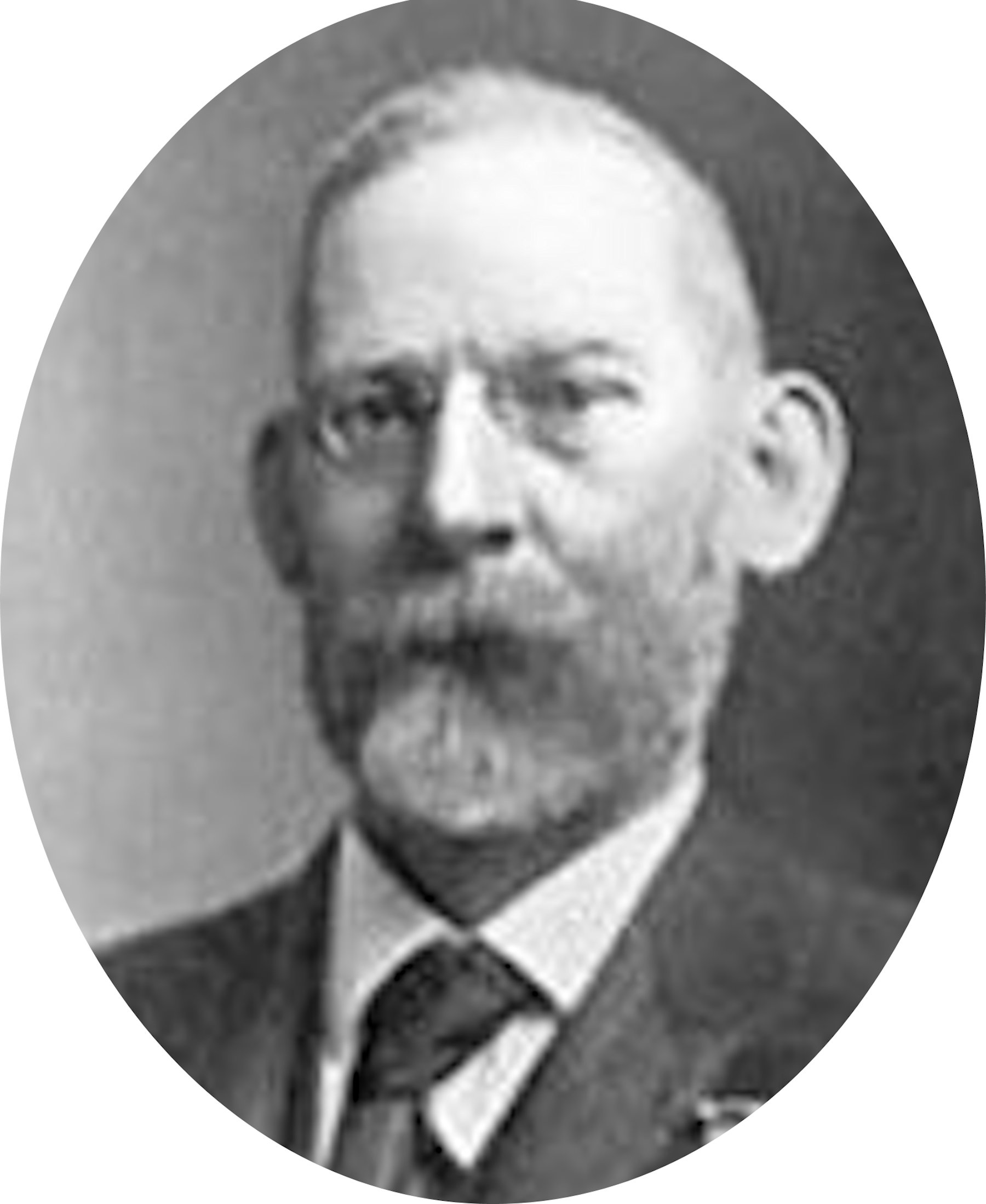
- Born: June 12, 1845; County Tyrone, Ireland
- Died: April 30, 1910 (aged 64)
- Burial place: Calvary Cemetery (Queens, New York)
- Military career
- Allegiance: United States
- Service: United States Army
- Rank: Captain
- Units: Company B, 69th New York Infantry
- Conflicts: Battle of Malvern Hill
- Awards: Medal of Honor

Peter F. Rafferty (1845-1910) was an American soldier, who served as a private in the Union Army. He received the Medal of Honor after being injured in the Battle of Malvern Hill.

== Biography ==
Peter Rafferty was born June 12, 1845, in County Tyrone, Ireland. He moved to the United States as a teenager. and would later enlist in the Union Army on October 22, 1861, in New York City. He was attached to the 69th New York Infantry and was a member of the Irish Brigade.

Only July 1, 1862 his regiment with the 88th New York Volunteer Infantry Regiment were at Malvern Hill, Virginia. Their units were ordered to stop an advancing unit of Confederate troops. During the battle he was wounded in the thigh. After regrouping he stayed with his unit, the Irish Brigade. He was wounded a second time and suffered injuries to his foot and to the face by two musket balls. He was captured by the Confederate army but did not receive any medical care for five days. He was later released in a prisoner exchange.

He was discharged on January 5, 1863, due to his injuries which left him with a fractured lower jaw and clavicle. In 1864, he re-enlisted in the Sixth District of Columbia Volunteers and became a lieutenant.

He died on April 30, 1910, and was buried at the Calvary Cemetery in Woodside, New York.

== Medal of Honor citation ==

Rank and Organization:

Rank and organization: Private, 69th New York Infantry. Place and date: Malvern Hill, Virginia, US, July 1, 1862. Entered service at: New York, N.Y. Born: June 12, 1845, Ireland. Date of issue: August 2, 1897.

Citation:

The President of the United States of America, in the name of Congress, takes pleasure in presenting the Medal of Honor to Private Peter F. Rafferty, United States Army, for extraordinary heroism on 1 July 1862, while serving with Company B, 69th New York Infantry, in action at Malvern Hill, Virginia. Having been wounded and directed to the rear, Private Rafferty declined to go, but continued in action, receiving several additional wounds, which resulted in his capture by the enemy and his total disability for military service.

== See also ==
- 69th Infantry Regiment (New York)
- List of American Civil War Medal of Honor recipients
- Medal of Honor
