= Patrick Kelly (Civil War) =

Union Army officer in the American Civil War

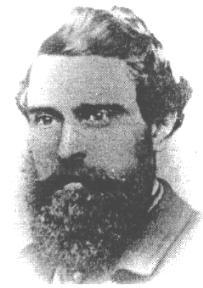
- Patrick Kelly
- Born: 1822; Castlehacket, Tuam, County Galway, Ireland
- Died: June 16, 1864 (aged 41–42); Petersburg, Virginia
- Military career
- Allegiance: United States of America; Union
- Branch: United States Army; Union Army
- Service years: 1861–1864
- Rank: Colonel
- Commands: Irish Brigade; 88th New York Infantry Regiment
- Conflicts: American Civil War; First Battle of Bull Run; Battle of Antietam; Battle of Fredericksburg; Battle of Chancellorsville; Battle of Gettysburg; Battle of the Wilderness; Battle of Spotsylvania Court House; Battle of Cold Harbor; Siege of Petersburg †

Patrick Kelly (c. 1822 – June 16, 1864) was an Irish-American Union Army officer during the American Civil War. He led the famed Irish Brigade at the Battle of Gettysburg.

== Early life ==
Kelly was born in Castlehacket, Tuam, Ireland, and emigrated to the United States, landing in New York City. His wife Elizabeth was also from Tuam.

== Civil War ==
At the outset of the Civil War, Kelly enlisted in the Union Army and saw action as captain of Company E of the 69th New York Infantry at the First Battle of Bull Run. He briefly was a captain in the 16th U.S. Infantry. On September 14, 1861, he was named lieutenant colonel of the 88th New York Infantry and fought in the Irish Brigade's major battles in 1862. He commanded the regiment at the Battle of Antietam. While stationed at Harpers Ferry following the Maryland Campaign, he was promoted to colonel on October 20, 1862. He led the regiment in the ill-fated attacks in front of Marye's Heights in the Battle of Fredericksburg. Kelly was acting commander of the Irish Brigade at the end of 1862.

After the 1863 Battle of Chancellorsville, Kelly was promoted to command the Irish Brigade following the resignation of Brig. Gen. Thomas Francis Meagher. Kelly led the heavily depleted brigade (fewer than 600 men) in an attack at the Wheatfield at Gettysburg. The brigade lost 198 of 532 troops engaged, around 37%.

Kelly resumed his role as colonel of his regiment as more senior officers returned to the brigade. However, with the death of Col. Richard Byrnes at the Battle of Cold Harbor in 1864, Kelly again commanded the brigade. At the age of 42, Kelly died during the Siege of Petersburg when he was shot through the head while leading the Irish Brigade forward against Confederate earthworks. His body was recovered and sent back to New York for his funeral. He was buried in First Calvary Cemetery in Woodside, New York.

== Sources ==
- Bilby, Joseph G., The Irish Brigade in the Civil War: The 69th New York and Other Irish Regiments of the Army of the Potomac. Conshohocken, Pennsylvania: Combined Books, 1998. ISBN 0-938289-97-7.
- Busey, John W., and Martin, David G., Regimental Strengths and Losses at Gettysburg, 4th Ed., Longstreet House, 2005, ISBN 0-944413-67-6.
- Jorgensen, Jay, Gettysburg's Bloody Wheatfield, Shippensberg, PA: White Mane Publishing, 2002, ISBN 978-1-57249-360-5.
- Pritchard, Russ A., The Irish Brigade: A Pictorial History of the Famed Civil War Fighters. New York: Running Press Book Publishers, 2004. ISBN 0-7624-2009-X.
- U.S. War Department, The War of the Rebellion: a Compilation of the Official Records of the Union and Confederate Armies, U.S. Government Printing Office, 1880–1901.
