= J. Howard Kitching =

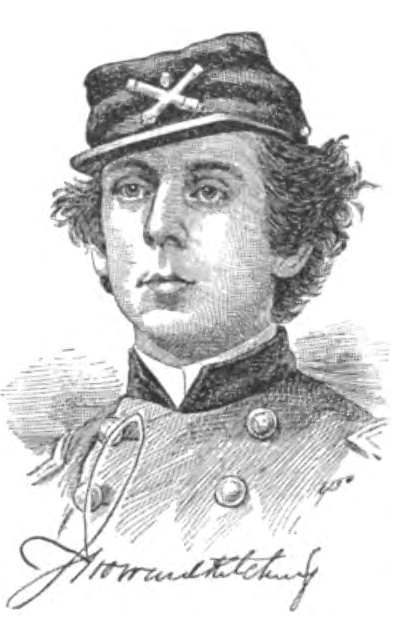
- Sketch after his death
- Born: July 16, 1838; New York City, US
- Died: January 11, 1865 (aged 26); Dobbs Ferry, New York, US
- Burial place: Green-Wood Cemetery, Brooklyn, New York
- Spouse: Harriet Brittan Ripley
- Military career
- Allegiance: United States; Union
- Branch: United States Army; Union Army
- Service years: 1861–1864
- Rank: Colonel; Brevet Brigadier General
- Unit: 2nd New York Artillery
- Commands: 6th New York Heavy Artillery; Kitching's Heavy Artillery Brigade
- Conflicts: American Civil War: Battle of the Wilderness; Battle of Spotsylvania; Battle of Cold Harbor; Second Battle of Petersburg; Battle of Fort Stevens; Battle of Cedar Creek
- Other work: merchant

John Howard Kitching (July 16, 1838 – January 10, 1865) often referred to as J. Howard Kitching, was an officer in the Union Army during the American Civil War. He served in the cavalry, artillery and infantry in the Army of the Potomac and Army of the Shenandoah. He received a posthumous promotion to brevet brigadier general after being mortally wounded at the Battle of Cedar Creek.

== Early life and family ==
Kitching was born July 16, 1838, in New York City (some sources say 1840). His father was merchant John Benjamin Kitching (1818–1887) and mother was Maria Bradner. His father, born in England, was one of the first investors in technology such as the ships of John Ericsson, the telegraph and the transatlantic telegraph cable.

He married Harriet Brittan Ripley (a descendant of the New England Dwight family) on July 18, 1860. They had two children: John Howard Kitching, Jr. born September 27, 1861, and Edith Howard Kitching born November 13, 1864.

== Civil War service ==
At the outbreak of the war, Kitching volunteered in the New York cavalry but was soon made a captain in the 2nd New York Artillery. In September 1862 he became lieutenant colonel of the 135th New York Infantry which was re-designated the 6th New York Heavy Artillery (nicknamed the Anthony Wayne Guard) a few weeks later. Kitching spent most of the war up to this point in garrison duty along the upper Potomac River. The regiment's colonel, William H. Morris, was promoted to brigadier general in November 1862 and on April 26, 1863, Kitching was appointed colonel. His regiment joined the Army of the Potomac during the final stages of the Gettysburg campaign following the battle of Gettysburg. During the Fall of 1863 and Winter 1864 Kitching briefly commanded the Army of the Potomac's ammunition train and artillery reserve.

=== Overland Campaign ===
At the battle of the Wilderness Kitching commanded a heavy artillery brigade in the Army of the Potomac's artillery reserve. Following the battle the artillery reserve was divided among the infantry corps and Kitching's brigade was assigned to the V Corps and fought with that corps at Spotsylvania. Kitching's artillery brigade was converted to infantry and assigned to the 3rd Division, V Corps at Cold Harbor and became the 3rd Brigade, 2nd Division, V Corps at Petersburg. Kitching and the 6th New York Heavy Artillery were transferred to the Washington defenses where he took part in the battle of Fort Stevens. Following the battle he commanded a brigade in the Washington defenses.

=== Shenandoah Valley Campaign ===
During Philip H. Sheridan's Valley Campaign, Kitching's command was transferred to the Army of the Shenandoah with the addition of other miscellaneous units and was known as Kitching's Provisional Division. His division was attached to George Crook's VIII Corps just days before the battle of Cedar Creek. At Cedar Creek, Confederate General John B. Gordon surprised the Union army in an early morning attack. Just as Rutherford B. Hayes, commanding a neighboring Union division, assured Kitching that his men would hold, Hayes' division was hit by Gordon's attack and broke for the rear. Before the Confederates even reached Kitching's line, his troops also began to retreat. Kitching himself was forced to leave the field after receiving a severe wound in his foot. As a result he was forced to leave the army and return home to recover. However on January 11, 1865, Kitching died as a result of his foot wound at his home in Dobbs Ferry, New York. A posthumous brevet promotion to brigadier general was awarded to Kitching, postdated August 1, 1864, for his service in the Richmond Campaign.
