= Elijah D. Taft =

American politician

Elijah Daniel Taft (1819-1915) was an artillery officer in the Union Army during the American Civil War.

== Pre-American Civil War ==
Taft was born in Mamaroneck, New York April 28, 1819. He worked as a carpenter in Brooklyn, New York. Taft entered a New York militia unit, rising to the rank of captain by the year 1855. In the same year Taft stood for political office in Brooklyn. He was nominated by the Know Nothing Party for the state legislator. Later the Whig Party also nominated him. The New York Times compared him to a man given an elephant who does not know what to do with it. Taft sought a commission with William Walker, the filibuster president of Nicaragua ca. 1856, citing his 15 years of militia experience.

== War Service ==
The 5th New York Independent Light Artillery was organized in Brooklyn, New York on August 15, 1861. Elijah Taft was commissioned its commander as a captain later in the year. The battery was intended to serve with the Excelsior Brigade on BG Daniel Sickles. The 5th New York Battery sometimes was called the First Excelsior Light Artillery. The 5th New York was mustered into the federal service on November 8, 1861. It departed for Washington, D. C. eight days later and stayed there, encamped near the Capitol, until March 1862. Then the gunners left for the Peninsula Campaign of MG George B. McClellan. It was assigned to the Reserve Artillery of the Army of the Potomac under Col Henry J. Hunt. The battery's equipment not having arrived, Taft, his officers and men served with other batteries at the Battle of Yorktown, the Battle of Seven Pines and the Seven Days Battles.

The 5th New York sailed from Harrison's Landing on August 9, 1862, arriving at Falmouth, Virginia. Fully equipped, the battery joined the Reserve Artillery attached to V Corps under Col William Hays, The battery was engaged at the Battle of Antietam, firing from two different positions against Confederate guns on the other side of Antietam Creek, one near the Middle Bridge and one farther to the left.

Taft's battery next served in the Reserve Artillery under Col Hays at the Battle of Fredericksburg. It was one of the batteries lined up overlooking the Rappahannock River to support the federal army's crossing of the river. In the Chancellorsville campaign he served under Cpt William M. Graham and BG Robert O. Tyler. In May 1863 his battery fired across the river not far from where it was positioned in December to cover the crossing of VI Corps at the beginning of the Second Battle of Fredericksburg.

After Chancellorsville, the Reserve Artillery was reorganized into brigades. Taft was assigned command of the Second Volunteers brigade, composed of four batteries: 1st Connecticut Heavy, Battery B: Capt Albert F. Brooker; 1st Connecticut Heavy, Battery M: Capt Franklin A. Pratt; 2nd Connecticut Light Battery: Capt John W. Sterling; 5th New York Independent Battery under Taft. During the Gettysburg campaign, two batteries were left in the rear areas of the army. The other two, led by Capt Taft, arrived on the Gettysburg battlefield.

At the Battle of Gettysburg, Taft's batteries arrived on July 2 about 10:30 A.M. and were held in reserve until they moved into position. The 5th New York was sent to the Evergreen Cemetery at about 3.30 P.M. This was part of Gen Hunt's effort to cover all Confederate angles of approach to Cemetery Hill. The guns were engaged from 4:00 P.M. until dark. Four guns of the battery were south of the Baltimore Pike firing at Confederate batteries on Benner's Hill. Two guns fired westward. The battery remained in place on the morning of July 3. One gun on Baltimore Pike burst, but the other three relieved the section firing westward against the Confederate guns on Seminary Ridge. They remained in that position until the close of the battle. The 5th New York lost 1 man killed and 2 wounded. The battery's monument stands in the Gettysburg National Cemetery. The 2nd Connecticut Battery under Capt. John W. Sterling reinforced the III Corps line until late in the day on July 2. Later it retired and on July 3 formed line under Ltc Freeman McGilvery on the left of II Corps on Cemetery Ridge.

After Gettysburg, Taft command his reserve artillery brigade in the Bristoe Campaign and at the Battle of Mine Run. At the beginning of the Overland Campaign of 1864, Major John A. Tompkins took command of the brigade, and consequently Taft resumed command of his battery. The battery participated in the Battle of the Wilderness and the Battle of Spotsylvania in the Reserve Artillery, but it was assigned to V Corps at the Battle of Cold Harbor. The 5th New York was sent to the defenses of Washington on May 19, 1864. It was in XXII Corps in July 1864; and in the artillery brigade of VI Corps in August.

Next Taft was sent with his guns to serve in the Army of the Shenandoah under MG Philip H. Sheridan. In the Valley Campaigns of 1864, Taft's battery was assigned to XIX Corps. He commanded the Artillery Reserve of the corps at the Third Battle of Winchester and the Battle of Fisher's Hill. When Maj Albert W. Bradbury took command of the Reserve, Taft resumed command of his battery, which was assigned to the first division of the corps. The battery fought at the Battle of Cedar Creek under Capt Taft. Thereafter the battery remained, with Taft as commander, in the Department of West Virginia. The 5th New York was mustered out of service at Hart's Island near New York City on July 16, 1865. Taft received brevet rank of major to date from March 13, 1865.

== Post-War ==
Taft filed for a pension in 1886. Nothing is recorded about his wife and children, but he died at the home of his grandson Edgar G. Taft at Freeport on Long Island on March 2, 1915.
