= 5th New York Independent Light Artillery =

5th Independent Battery, New York Volunteer Light Artillery
- Active: November 8, 1861 - July 6, 1865
- Country: United States
- Allegiance: Union
- Branch: Artillery
- Engagements: Peninsula Campaign; Siege of Yorktown; Battle of Seven Pines; Seven Days Battles; Battle of Beaver Dam Creek; Battle of Savage's Station; Battle of White Oak Swamp; Battle of Glendale; Battle of Malvern Hill; Battle of Antietam; Battle of Fredericksburg; Battle of Chancellorsville; Battle of Gettysburg; Bristoe Campaign; Mine Run Campaign; Battle of the Wilderness; Battle of Spotsylvania Court House; Battle of Fort Stevens; Third Battle of Winchester; Battle of Fisher's Hill; Battle of Cedar Creek

The 5th Independent Battery, New York Volunteer Light Artillery or 5th New York Independent Light Artillery ("1st Excelsior Light Artillery") was an artillery battery that served in the Union Army during the American Civil War.

== Service ==
The battery was organized at New York City, New York and mustered in for a three-year enlistment on November 8, 1861 under the command of Captain Elijah D. Taft.

The battery was attached to Artillery Reserve, Army of the Potomac, to May 1862. Unattached, Artillery Reserve, V Corps, Army of the Potomac, to September 1862. Reserve Artillery, V Corps, to December 1862. Artillery Reserve, Army of the Potomac, to May 1863. 2nd Volunteer Brigade, Artillery Reserve, Army of the Potomac, to November 1863. 1st Volunteer Brigade, Artillery Reserve, to March 1864. 2nd Brigade, Artillery Reserve, to May 1864. Artillery Brigade, V Corps, May 15–19. DeRussy's Division, XXII Corps, Department of Washington, to July 1864. Artillery Brigade, VI Corps, to August 1864. Artillery, 1st Division, XIX Corps, Army of the Shenandoah, Middle Military Division, to December 1864. Artillery Brigade, XIX Corps, to February 1865. Artillery Reserve, Army of the Shenandoah, and Department of West Virginia, to July 1865.

The 5th New York Light Artillery mustered out of service on July 6, 1865.

== Detailed service ==
Left New York for Washington, D.C., November 16, 1861. Duty in the defenses of Washington, D. C., until March 1862. Peninsula Campaign March to August 1862. Siege of Yorktown April 5-May 4. Battle of Seven Pines or Fair Oaks May 31-June 1. Seven Days Battles before Richmond June 25-July 1. Battle of Mechanicsville June 26. Savage's Station June 29. White Oak Swamp and Glendale June 30. Malvern Hill July 1. At Harrison's Landing until August 16. Moved to Alexandria August 16–24. Maryland Campaign September 6–22. Battle of Antietam September 16–17. Duty in Maryland until October 29. Movement to Falmouth, Va., October 29-November 19. Battle of Fredericksburg, Va., December 12–15. "Mud March" January 20–24, 1863. At Falmouth until April. Chancellorsville Campaign April 27-May 6. Battle of Chancellorsville May 1–5. Gettysburg Campaign June 3-July 31. Battle of Gettysburg July 1–3. On line of the Rappahannock until October. Bristoe Campaign October 9–22. Advance to line of the Rappahannock November 7–8. Rappahannock Station November 7. Mine Run Campaign November 26-December 2. Campaign of the Rapidan May 3–19, 1864. Battle of the Wilderness May 5–7. Laurel Hill May 8. Spotsylvania May 8–12. Spotsylvania Court House May 12–19. Ordered to Washington May 19, and duty in the defenses of that city until July. Repulse of Early's attack on Washington July 11–12. Sheridan's Shenandoah Valley Campaign August 7-November 28. Third Battle of Winchester September 19. Fisher's Hill September 22. Battle of Cedar Creek October 19. Duty in the Shenandoah Valley and in the Department of West Virginia until July 1865.

== Casualties ==
The battery lost a total of 17 men during service; 4 enlisted men killed or mortally wounded, 13 enlisted men died of disease.

== Commanders ==
- Captain Elijah D. Taft
- 1st Lieutenant John V. Grant - commanded at the Third Battle of Winchester

== See also ==
- List of New York Civil War regiments
- New York in the Civil War
