= 6th Maine Light Artillery Battery =

- Active: January 1, 1862, to June 7, 1865
- Country: United States
- Allegiance: Union
- Branch: Artillery
- Equipment: 1 3 inch caliber ordnance rifle, 3 12-pdr Napoleons [at Antietam]; 4 12-pdr Napoleons [at Gettysburg]
- Engagements: Battle of Cedar Mountain; Battle of Groveton; Second Battle of Bull Run; Maryland Campaign; Battle of Antietam; Battle of Gettysburg; Bristoe Campaign; Mine Run Campaign; Overland Campaign; Battle of the Wilderness; Battle of Spotsylvania Court House; Battle of Totopotomoy Creek; Battle of Cold Harbor; Siege of Petersburg; Battle of Jerusalem Plank Road; First Battle of Deep Bottom; Second Battle of Petersburg

6th Maine Light Artillery Battery was an artillery battery that served in the Union Army during the American Civil War.

== Service ==
The 6th Maine Battery was organized in Augusta, Maine and mustered in for three years' service on January 1, 1862, under the command of Captain Freeman McGilvery.

The battery was attached to 2nd Division, II Corps, Army of Virginia, to August 1862. 3rd Division, III Corps, Army of the Potomac, August 1862. Artillery, 1st Division, III Corps, to September 1862. Artillery, 2nd Division, XII Corps, Army of the Potomac, to June 1863. 4th Volunteer Brigade, Artillery Reserve, Army of the Potomac, to September 1863. 1st Volunteer Brigade, Artillery Reserve, to April 1864. Artillery Brigade, II Corps, to November 1864. Artillery Reserve, Army of the Potomac, to June 1865.

The 6th Maine Battery mustered out of service June 7, 1865, at Augusta, Maine.

== Detailed service ==
Duty at Augusta until March and at Portland, Me., until April 1. Moved to Washington, D.C., April 1–3. Camp at East Capitol Hill and at Forts Buffalo and Ramsey, and at Falls Church, Va., until June. Ordered to report to General Banks at Harpers Ferry, W. Va. Duty at Harpers Ferry, Cedar Creek, and Little Washington, Va., June to August 1862. Battle of Cedar Mountain August 9. Pope's Campaign in northern Virginia August 16-September 2. Fords of the Rappahannock August 20–26. Battles of Groveton August 29, and Second Bull Run August 30. Chantilly September 1. Maryland Campaign September–October. Crampton's Pass, South Mountain, Md., September 14. Battle of Antietam, September 16–17. Duty at Sandy Hook, Md., and at Harpers Ferry, W. Va., until December. Reconnaissance to Winchester December 2–6. Action at Dumfries December 27. Duty at Dumfries until May 27, 1863, and at Falmouth until June 13. Gettysburg Campaign June–July. Battle of Gettysburg July 1–3. Pursuit to Williamsport, Md., July 7–14. Frederick, Md., July 13. March to Warrenton Junction, Va., July 18-August 2, and duty there until September 16. At Culpeper until October 12. Bristoe Campaign October 12–22. Culpeper October 12–13. Bristoe October 14. Advance to line of Rappahannock November 7–8. Mine Run Campaign November 26-December 2. Mine Run November 28–30. Campaign from the Rapidan to James River May 3-June 15, 1864. Battles of the Wilderness May 5–7; Spotsylvania May 8–12; Spotsylvania Court House May 12–21; "Bloody Angle," Spotsylvania Court House, May 12. North Anna River May 23–26. On line of the Pamunkey May 26–28. Totopotomoy May 28–31. Cold Harbor June 1–12. Before Petersburg June 16–19. Siege of Petersburg June 16, 1864, to April 2, 1865. Jerusalem Plank Road June 22–23, 1864. Deep Bottom July 27–28. Mine Explosion July 30 (reserve). Strawberry Plains, Deep Bottom, August 14–18. Garrison, Fort Davis, until October 20. At Fort McGilvrey and Battery 9 until March 15, 1865. At Fort Sampson until April 3. Assault on and capture of Petersburg April 2–3. Ordered to reserve artillery at City Point April 3. Duty there until May 3. Ordered to Alexandria and duty there to June 4. Ordered to Augusta, Me. for muster out.

== Casualties ==
The battery lost a total of 40 enlisted men during service; 13 enlisted men killed or mortally wounded, 27 enlisted men died of disease.

== Commanders ==
- Captain Freeman McGilvery
- Captain Edwin B. Dow - commanded at the battle of Gettysburg as 1st Lieutenant
- 1st Lieutenant William H. Rogers - commanded during the Bristoe Campaign

== See also ==
- List of Maine Civil War units
- Maine in the American Civil War
