= Battery A, 1st New Jersey Light Artillery =

- Active: August 12, 1861 to June 22, 1865
- Country: United States
- Allegiance: Union
- Branch: Artillery
- Engagements: Siege of Yorktown; Battle of Seven Pines; Seven Days Battles; Battle of Antietam; Battle of Fredericksburg; Battle of Chancellorsville; Battle of Gettysburg; Mine Run Campaign; Battle of the Wilderness; Battle of Spotsylvania Court House; Battle of Cold Harbor; Siege of Petersburg; Appomattox Campaign; Battle of Sailor's Creek

Battery A, 1st New Jersey Light Artillery was an artillery battery that served in the Union Army during the American Civil War.

== Service ==
The battery was organized at Hoboken, New Jersey and mustered in for a three-year enlistment on August 12, 1861 under the command of Captain William Hexamer.

The battery was attached to Kearney's Brigade, Division of the Potomac, to October 1861. Franklin's Division, Army of the Potomac, to March 1862. Artillery, 1st Division, I Corps, Army of the Potomac, to May 1862. Artillery, 1st Division, VI Corps, to May 1863. Artillery Brigade, VI Corps, to June 1863. 4th Volunteer Brigade, Artillery Reserve, Army of the Potomac, to October 1863. 3rd Volunteer Brigade, Artillery Reserve, to March 1864. 1st Volunteer Brigade, Artillery Reserve, to May 1864. Artillery Brigade, VI Corps, to July 1864. Artillery Reserve, Army of the Potomac, to December 1864. Artillery Brigade, VI Corps, to June 1865.

Battery A, 1st New Jersey Light Artillery mustered out of service June 22, 1865.

== Detailed service ==
Left New Jersey for Washington, D.C., August 20, 1861. Duty in the defenses of Washington, D.C., until March 1862. Advance on Manassas, Virginia, March 10–15, 1862. Advance from Alexandria to Bristoe Station April 7–11. Embarked for the Virginia Peninsula April 17. Siege of Yorktown, Virginia, April 19-May 4 (on transports). West Point May 7–8. Battle of Seven Pines May 31-June 1. Seven days before Richmond June 25-July 1. Battles of Gaines' Mill June 27. Brackett's June 30. Charles City Cross Roads and Glendale June 30. Malvern Hill July 1. At Harrison's Landing until August 16. Movement to Manassas August 16–26. Pope's Campaign in northern Virginia August 26-September 2. Bull Run Bridge August 27. Chantilly September 1. Maryland Campaign September 6–22. Crampton's Pass, Md., September 14. Antietam September 16–17. Duty in Maryland until October 30. Movement to Falmouth, Va., October 30-November 19. Battle of Fredericksburg, Va., December 12–15. Duty near Falmouth, Va., until April 27, 1863. "Mud March" January 20–24. Chancellorsville Campaign April 27-May 6. Operations at Franklin's Crossing April 29-May 2. Battle of Maryes Heights, Fredericksburg, May 3. Salem Heights May 3–4. Banks' Ford May 4. Gettysburg Campaign June 11-July 24. Battle of Gettysburg July 2–4. Pursuit of Lee to Manassas Gap October 5–24. Duty on line of the Rappahannock and Rapidan until October. Bristoe Campaign October 9–22. Advance to line of the Rappahannock November 7–8. Mine Run Campaign November 26-December 2. Payne's Farm November 27. Duty near Brandy Station, Va., until May 1864. Campaign from the Rapidan to the James May 3-June 15. Battle of the Wilderness May 5–7. Spotsylvania May 8–21. North Anna River May 23–26. On line of the Pamunkey May 26–28. Totopotomoy May 28–31. Cold Harbor June 1–12. (Temporarily with XVIII Corps.) Before Petersburg June 16–18. Siege of Petersburg June 16, 1864 to April 2, 1865. Jerusalem Plank Road June 22–23, 1864. At City Point July 9–26. Demonstration north of the James River July 27–29. Deep Bottom July 27–28. Fort Fisher, Petersburg, March 25, 1865. Appomattox Campaign March 28-April 9. Fall of Petersburg April 2. Sailor's Creek April 6. High Bridge, Farmville, April 7. Appomattox Court House April 9. Surrender of Lee and his army. March to Danville April 23–27, and duty there until May 18. Marched to Richmond, then to Washington, D.C., May 18-June 3. Corps review June 8.

== Casualties ==
The battery lost a total of 15 men during service; 3 enlisted men killed or mortally wounded, 12 enlisted men died of disease.

== Commanders ==
- Captain William Hexamer
- Captain Augustine N. Parsons - commanded at the battles of Chancellorsville and Gettysburg while still at the rank of lieutenant

== See also ==
- List of New Jersey Civil War units
- New Jersey in the Civil War
