= Richard Byrnes =

Irish-born Union Army officer

- Born: 1832; County Cavan, Ireland
- Died: 1864 (aged 31–32); Cold Harbor, Virginia, United States
- Burial place: Calvary Cemetery, Queens, New York
- Military career
- Allegiance: United States of America
- Branch: USA Army
- Service years: 1851 - 1864
- Rank: Colonel
- Commands: 28th Massachusetts Volunteers; Irish Brigade
- Conflicts: Indian Campaigns: Florida, Oregon; American Civil War: Fredericksburg, Chancellorsville, Gettysburg, Cold Harbor

Richard Byrnes (1832 – June 10, 1864) was an Irish-American officer in the United States Army, who rose to command the Union Army's Irish Brigade during the American Civil War.

== Life ==
Byrnes was born in County Cavan, Ireland, and emigrated to New York City in 1844. He enlisted in the regular army of the United States in 1851, joining the 2nd U.S. Cavalry, a regiment then commanded by Colonel E. V. Sumner. In this regiment young Byrnes distinguished himself in the Indian campaigns in Florida and Oregon.

As the American Civil War broke out he was, on the recommendation of Colonel Sumner, commissioned as First Lieutenant in the 5th U.S. Cavalry, one of the new regiments authorized by Congress. He remained with the regiment of regulars through the campaigns of 1861 and 1862, then was appointed to an Irish regiment by Governor John Albion Andrew, Colonel of the 28th Massachusetts Volunteer Infantry Regiment, of which he took command on October 18, 1862. His new regiment was attached to Thomas Francis Meagher's Irish Brigade the following November, and with it participated in the fierce fighting in which the Army of the Potomac was subsequently engaged.

At its head, Colonel Byrnes charged up the slope of Marye's Heights at the Battle of Fredericksburg, and after it, like the other regiments of the brigade, had been almost wiped out in the sanguinary conflicts at Chancellorsville and Gettysburg, he was sent back to Massachusetts to recruit its ranks during the winter and spring of 1863 and 1864. When the campaign reopened in May, he returned to the front and as the senior officer took command of the Irish Brigade.

Two weeks after assuming command, on June 3, 1864, Colonel Byrnes fell, mortally wounded, while leading the brigade during the attack on the entrenchments at Cold Harbor, Virginia. He lived long enough to be conveyed to Washington, where his wife reached him before he died. His commission as brigadier general had just been made out by President Abraham Lincoln, but he was dead before it could be officially presented to him, and so the promotion never took effect. His remains were sent to New York and buried in Calvary Cemetery.
