= 6th New York Heavy Artillery Regiment =

6th Regiment New York Heavy Artillery, U.S. Volunteers
- Active: September 2, 1862 – October 3, 1862 (As 135th New York State Volunteers); October 3, 1862 – August 24, 1865 (As 6th New York Heavy Artillery)
- Disbanded: August 24, 1865
- Country: United States
- Allegiance: Union
- Branch: Infantry/Artillery
- Engagements: American Civil War: Battle of Manassas Gap; Mine Run Campaign; Battle of the Wilderness; Battle of Spotsylvania Courthouse; Battle of Cold Harbor; Battle of Cedar Creek; Siege of Petersburg

Insignia
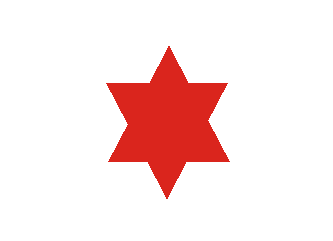
- 1st Division, VIII Corps

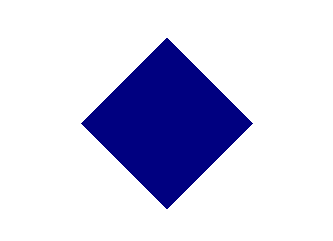
- 3rd Division, III Corps

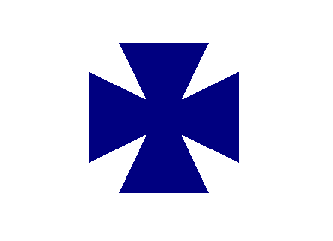
- 3rd Division, V Corps

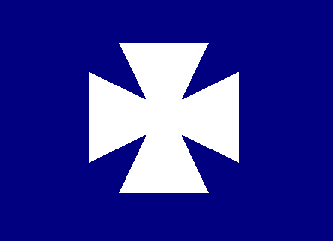
- 2nd Division, V Corps

The 6th Regiment New York Heavy Artillery, U.S. Volunteers, the "Anthony Wayne Guard", was an artillery regiment of the Union Army during the American Civil War. It was originally mustered in as the 135th New York Volunteer Infantry Regiment, and served as both artillery and infantry.

== Service ==
The regiment was organized under Col. William H. Morris and Lieut.-Col. J. Howard Kitching, at Yonkers, as the 135th Regiment of Infantry, and there mustered in the service of the United States for three years, September 2, 1862; having been converted into an artillery regiment, it was, October 6, 1862, designated the 6th Regiment of Artillery, and two additional companies were recruited for it and mustered, December 4, 1862, in the United States service for three years; Company M was consolidated into Company A, January 26, 1864, and a new company formed of the men recruited by M. R. Pierce, for the 14th Artillery, transferred to this regiment January 13, 1864; February 2, 1864, surplus men of the 14th and 16th Artillery, about 400, were also transferred to this regiment. June 28, 1865, the men whose term of service would expire October 1, 1865, were, under the command of Col. George C. Kibbe, mustered out at Petersburg, Virginia; those remaining were organized into a battalion of four companies, A, B, C and D; and there were added to them, July 19, 1865, the men not discharged at the muster-out of their regiments, of the 10th Artillery, forming Companies L, F and G, and of the 13th Artillery, forming Companies H, I, K, L and M, thus reorganizing the regiment.

The original companies were recruited principally:

- A and F at Peekskill and Yonkers;
- B at Greenburgh, White Plains, Scarsdale, Harrison and Mt. Pleasant;
- C at West Farms;
- D at Somers, North Salem, Bedford and Poundridge;
- E at Port Chester, New York, Harrison, New Rochelle, Mamaroneck and Rye;
- G at South East, Kent and Carmel;
- H at Morrisania;
- I at Ossining, New Castle, Yorktown, Cortland, Mt. Pleasant and Bedford;
- K at Orangetown, White Plains, West Farms, Clarkstown, Scarsdale and Greenburgh;
- L at Cold Springs, Carmel, Yorktown and Queensborough, at Paterson and town of Kent, New Jersey; and
- M at Haverstraw, Yonkers, Somers, Poundridge, Bedford, Mt. Pleasant, North Salem and New Castle.

The regiment (ten companies) left the State, September 5, 1862, and served in the Railroad Division of the 8th Corps, Middle Department, from September 1862; Companies L and M joined it at Baltimore, Maryland, in December 1862; the regiment served at Harper's Ferry, West Virginia, defenses of the Upper Potomac River, from January 1863; in the 2d Brigade, 1st Division, 8th Corps, from March 27, 1863; in the 1st Brigade, 1st Division, 8th Corps, from June 1863; in the 1st Brigade, 3d Division, 3d Corps, Army of Potomac, from July 10, 1863; with the Reserve Artillery, Army of Potomac, as Ammunition Guard from August 1863; in the 1st Brigade, Reserve Artillery, Army of Potomac, from April 1864; in the Heavy Artillery Brigade, 5th Corps, from May 13, 1864; in the 3d Division, 5th Corps, from May 30, 1864; in the 3d Brigade, 2d Division, 5th Corps, from June 2, 1864; in the 1st Brigade, Harden's Division, 22d Corps, from July 1864; in the 1st Brigade, Kitching's Provisional Division, Army of the Shenandoah, from September 27, 1864; in the 2d Brigade, Ferrero's Division, Army of the James, at Bermuda Hundred, Virginia, from December 1864. It served as heavy artillery and infantry.

The 6th New York Heavy Artillery was at the crossroads of many of the Civil War's fiercest battles. Their first action occurred in December 1862 in Maryland. They guarded the Baltimore and Ohio Railroad and occasionally skirmished with Confederate sympathizers. In the summer of 1863, they marched with the Army of the Potomac and served as part of the reserves at the Battle of Gettysburg. After the battle was over, members of the regiment buried the dead.

When General Ulysses S. Grant launched his overland campaign in the spring of 1864, the 6th participated in a succession of bloody battles. These included the Battle of the Wilderness, the Battle of Spotsylvania, the Battle of Cold Harbor, the Siege at Petersburg, and the Battle of Cedar Creek, which was fought on October 19. At Cedar Creek, located in the Shenandoah Valley, the 6th were surprise attacked by the Confederates. They rallied and were able to repulse the attack thanks to the leadership of General Sheridan. Unfortunately for the 6th, Colonel J. Howard Kitching was wounded and died of his wounds on January 10. They 6th also distinguished themselves at the Battle of Harris Farm. They held their ground for over two hours and repulsed a more experienced enemy. General Gordon Meade commended the regiment "for their gallantry conduct in this affair and classing us with the Veterans of the Army of the Potomac."

== Total strength and casualties ==
The regiment was honorably discharged and mustered out August 24, 1865, near Washington, D. C., having during its service lost by death, killed in action, 1 officer, 62 enlisted men; of wounds received in action, 5 officers, 68 enlisted men; of disease and other causes, 6 officers, 278 enlisted men; total, 12 officers, 408 enlisted men; aggregate, 420; of whom 57 enlisted men died in the hands of the enemy.

== Commanders ==
- Colonel William H. Morris - promoted to Brigadier General
- Colonel J. Howard Kitching - mortally wounded
- Colonel George C. Kibbe
- Colonel Stephen D. Baker

== See also ==
- List of New York Civil War regiments
