= Irish Brigade (Union army) =

U.S. Civil War unit mainly composed of Irish Americans

- Flag of the 1st Regiment of the Irish Brigade
- Active: September 1861–July 1865
- Country: United States
- Branch: (United States) U.S. Army (Volunteer Infantry)
- Type: Infantry
- Size: Five regiments 63rd New York Infantry; 69th New York Infantry; 88th New York Infantry; 29th Regiment Massachusetts Volunteer Infantry (formally); 28th Massachusetts Infantry regiment 116th Pennsylvania Infantry
- Nickname: Irish Brigade
- Motto: Riamh nár dhruid ó spairn lann "Who never retreated from the clash of spears"
- Colors: Green
- March: Garyowen
- Engagements: American Civil War; Peninsula Campaign; Battle of Fair Oaks; Seven Days Battles; Battle of Gaines' Mill; Battle of Savage's Station; Battle of Malvern Hill; Battle of Antietam; Battle of Fredericksburg; Battle of Chancellorsville; Battle of Gettysburg; Battle of Bristoe Station; Mine Run Campaign; Battle of the Wilderness; Battle of Spotsylvania Courthouse; Battle of North Anna; Battle of Totopotomoy Creek; Battle of Cold Harbor; Second Battle of Petersburg; Battle of Jerusalem Plank Road; First Battle of Deep Bottom; Reams Station; Battle of Boydton Plank Road; Battle of Hatcher's Run; Dabney's Mills; Watkins House (Petersburg, VA); White Oak Bridge; Sutherland Station; Sailors Creek; Battle of Appomattox Court House

Commanders
- Notable commanders: Brig. Gen. Thomas Francis Meagher

The Irish Brigade was an infantry brigade, consisting predominantly of Irish Americans, who served in the Union Army in the American Civil War. The designation of the first regiment in the brigade, the 69th New York Infantry, or the "Fighting 69th," continued in later wars. The Irish Brigade was known in part for its famous war cry, the "Faugh a Ballaugh" which is an anglicization of the Irish phrase, fág an bealach, meaning "clear the way" and used in various Irish-majority military units founded due to the Irish diaspora. According to Fox's Regimental Losses, of all Union army brigades, only the 1st Vermont Brigade and Iron Brigade suffered more combat dead than the Irish Brigade during America's Civil War.

== Formation and subordinate regiments ==
The formation of an Irish Brigade was authorized by the Secretary of War Simon Cameron in September 1861. The brigade originally consisted of the 63rd New York Infantry, the 69th New York Infantry, and the 88th New York Infantry. The three New York regiments were soon joined by a predominantly "Yankee" regiment from Massachusetts, the 29th Massachusetts. The 29th was never fond of being brigaded with three Irish "Fenian" regiments from New York and soon after the Battle of Antietam the 29th was replaced by the 28th Massachusetts Infantry regiment, made up mostly of Irish immigrants. Soon after that, the City of Philadelphia offered a regiment to the brigade and soon after the 116th Pennsylvania Infantry was added to the brigade, bringing the total number of regiments in the Irish Brigade to five.

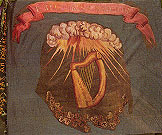
28th Massachusetts regimental color, presented by Gen. Thomas F. Meagher

There were three core regiments of the Irish Brigade, the 69th, 88th, and the 63rd. The 69th New York Volunteers, was largely made up of the pre-war 69th New York Militia, a unit which first gained notoriety prior to the Civil War, when Colonel Michael Corcoran refused an order to parade the regiment for the Prince of Wales during the latter's visit to New York City. The 63rd New York Volunteers, known as the "Third Irish" was composed mainly of the Irish in "the Old 9th" New York Militia and several hundred Irish recruited in Boston. The 63rd was organized by Lt Col Patrick Daniel Kelly and later commanded by Major then Colonel Richard C. Enright. The 88th was numbered out of sequence after the British 88th Connaught Rangers, and was the 2nd Regiment Irish Brigade. After Chancellorsville, the new Brigade Commander, Col Patrick Kelly of the 88th, formed these "core" NY regiments, now together only numbering 220 effectives, into a single battalion under the flag of the 88th.

== American Civil War ==
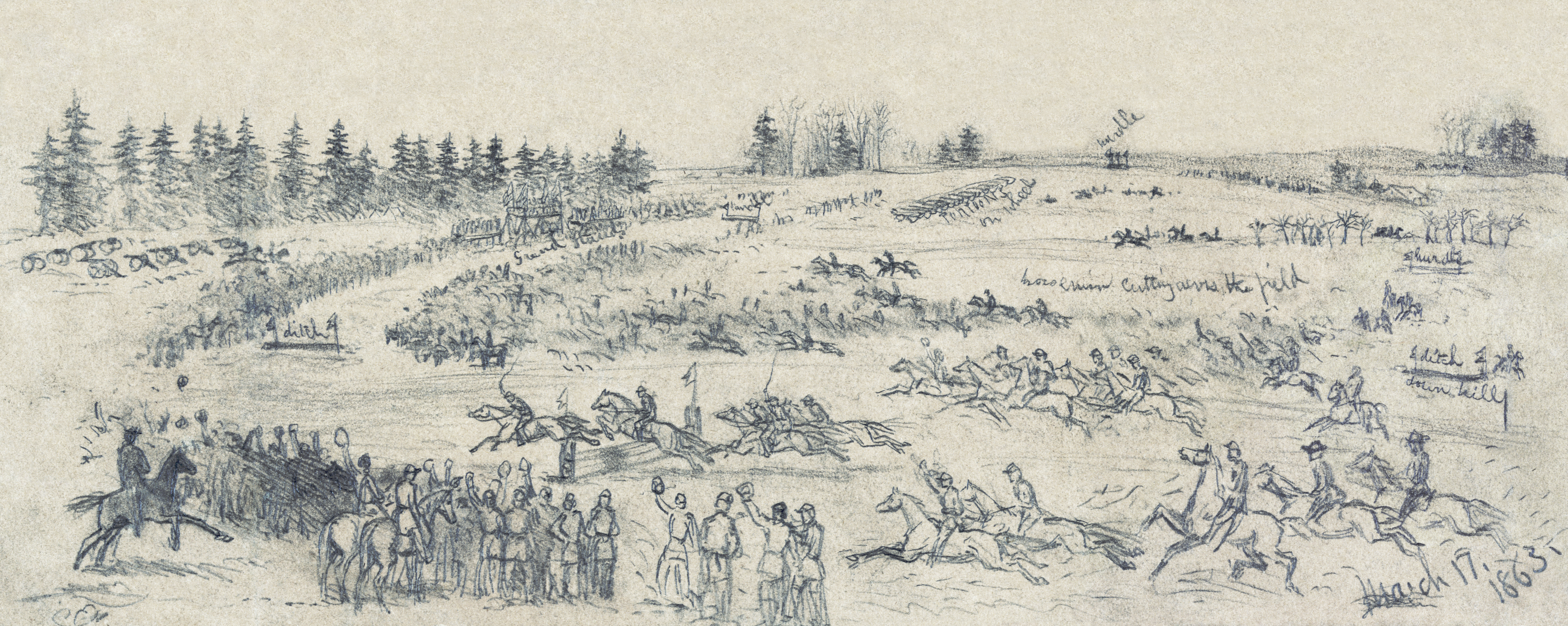
Saint Patrick's Day celebration in the Army of the Potomac. Depicts a steeplechase race among the Irish Brigade, March 17, 1863, by Edwin Forbes. Digitally restored.

Col. Corcoran was in the process of being court-martialed when the Civil War erupted. As the Army needed as many men at arms as quickly as possible, the charges were dropped and the Army rushed the 69th to Virginia.

At the First Battle of Bull Run (First Manassas), the regiment served under the command of Colonel William T. Sherman, and was one of the few Union regiments to retain cohesion after the defeat, despite the wounding and capture of Col. Corcoran by Confederate forces. The 69th served as the Army of the Potomac's rear guard during the disorganized retreat to the defenses of Washington.

After Bull Run, Thomas Francis Meagher, the Captain of Company K, applied to have the 69th New York Volunteer Militia reorganized into Federal service as the core unit of a larger brigade composed predominantly of Irish immigrants. Meagher was promoted to brigadier general and designated the brigade's commander. Before the war, he was a leading agitator for Irish independence. A visible participant in the failed Rebellion of 1848, he was afterward tried and sentenced to death (commuted to life imprisonment in Australia, but he escaped to San Francisco CA). Gen. Meagher's battle sword, made by Tiffany & Co, is now on permanent exhibit at the Fredericksburg and Spotsylvania National Military Park.

Leaders of the Federal Government were reluctant to form ethnically based brigades, which would undermine the notion of a Union. However, by mid-1861 the formation of an ethnically based, Irish brigade served two purposes for the North. First of all, it warned Britain that there could be Union-supported consequences in Ireland if Britain intervened (most of the brigade's leadership were known Irish revolutionaries). Secondly, it served to solidify Irish-American support for the Union. Many Irish were divided between supporting the Confederate States in their struggles for independence or to preserve the Union, which gave the Irish a set of rights and freedoms under the Constitution but which they had to struggle to obtain. There were also concerns by some Irish about a flood of freed slaves migrating north and competing for the lowly jobs for which they already had to scrabble. An ethnically based brigade would thus solidify the support of the largest Catholic minority for the Union cause. Several officers were permitted to purchase and carry non-regulation model 1850 Staff and Field officer's swords bearing a large four-leaf clover pierced into the hand guard. Having their own paid Catholic chaplains within the brigade implied a social acceptance for Irish Catholics which had eluded them in the antebellum period. Their head chaplain was Fr. William Corby, CSC, a Holy Cross priest and future president of the University of Notre Dame. He became famous for his giving general absolution to the troops of the Irish Brigade before the Battle of Gettysburg.

The Irish Brigade distinguished itself from the rest of the Army of the Potomac by Meagher's insistence on arming the eight line companies of each NY regiment with Model 1842 smoothbore muskets, an obsolete weapon that was largely phased out during 1862, because he wanted his men to be able to fire buck-and-ball shot (a .69 caliber musket ball with four smaller balls), which produced a shotgun effect in close-range combat and could not be used with rifles. The three original New York regiments carried Model 1842 muskets all through the AoP's campaigns and battles in 1862–63, using buck-and-ball shot with deadly effect in the Sunken Road on September 17, 1862 at Antietam and in the Wheatfield on July 2, 1863, at Gettysburg. The two light companies of each NY regiment were issued with either Springfield Models 1854 (A rifled modification of the Model 1842 musket), 1861, 1863 or Enfield rifles and with these sniped at Pettigrew's command during Pickett's Charge. The 28th Massachusetts (which joined in October 1862) had Enfield rifles and were with the 6 Company, NY "Light Battalion" often detailed for skirmishing duty.

Meagher assumed his brigade would perform most fighting at close range where smoothbores were effective and his officers generally agreed. The majority of the soldiers continued to use their Model 1842s through the Overland Campaign until the depleted outfit was temporarily broken up in June 1864. The 116th Pennsylvania was separated from its fellow regiments and finally got Model 1861 Springfield rifles. Ordnance records also indicate that the New York regiments received the newer weapons as well. In any case, by 1864, officers had at last realized the power of rifles and firing was now typically being done from distances of up to 200 yards. There are relatively few complaints on record from the enlisted men about their outdated muskets, although one veteran of the 88th New York recalled that "we were sometimes at a disadvantage because of the short range" and that he had to pick up a discarded rifle from the field at Antietam to deal with Confederate skirmishers.

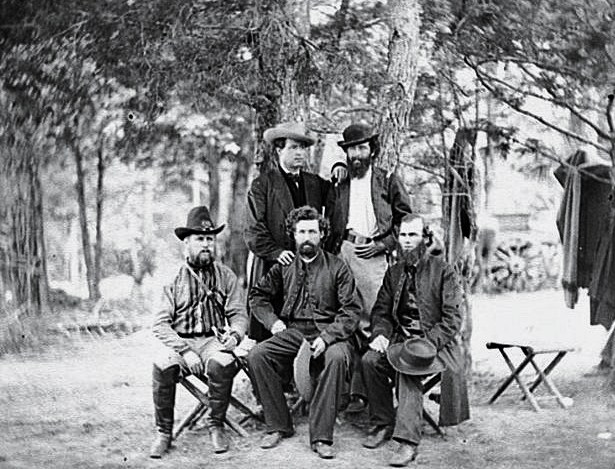
Chaplains of the Irish Brigade, Fr. Corby front row, right

Before the full five regiments of a typical brigade could be raised, the unit was called to combat. In March 1862 the brigade, composed of the 63rd, 69th, and 88th New York regiments, was assigned to Major General Edwin V. Sumner's division in the Army of the Potomac as the 2nd Brigade and shipped to the Virginia Peninsula. While the Army of the Potomac crept slowly toward Richmond, a fourth regiment joined the brigade: the 29th Massachusetts, a regiment formed mainly of Puritan descendants. Massachusetts had pledged to provide an Irish regiment, intending to send the 28th Massachusetts, but that Irish regiment was not complete when the Army of the Potomac went into action. Instead, the next available unit, the 29th, was sent.

Despite their divergent backgrounds, the 29th Massachusetts and the rest of the brigade fought well together, earning plaudits for hard campaigning during the Seven Days Battles; most notably at Savage's Station, Glendale, and Malvern Hill. The total casualties for the Irish Brigade during the Peninsula Campaign were 493. After Malvern Hill, the Army of the Potomac languished at Harrison's Landing on the Peninsula and Meagher gained permission to recruit in New York to replenish the brigade's losses. While other units were transferred to northern Virginia during the summer of 1862 to fight under Gen. John Pope, the Irish Brigade remained on the Peninsula with Gen. George B. McClellan.

After Pope's defeat at Second Battle of Bull Run (Second Manassas), Gen. Robert E. Lee took the offensive, moving into Maryland. McClellan and the remainder of Army of the Potomac were rushed north. The brigade's new recruits, approximately a tenth of the number that Meagher had hoped to raise, joined the unit at Tennallytown, Maryland, in time to march in pursuit of the Confederates.

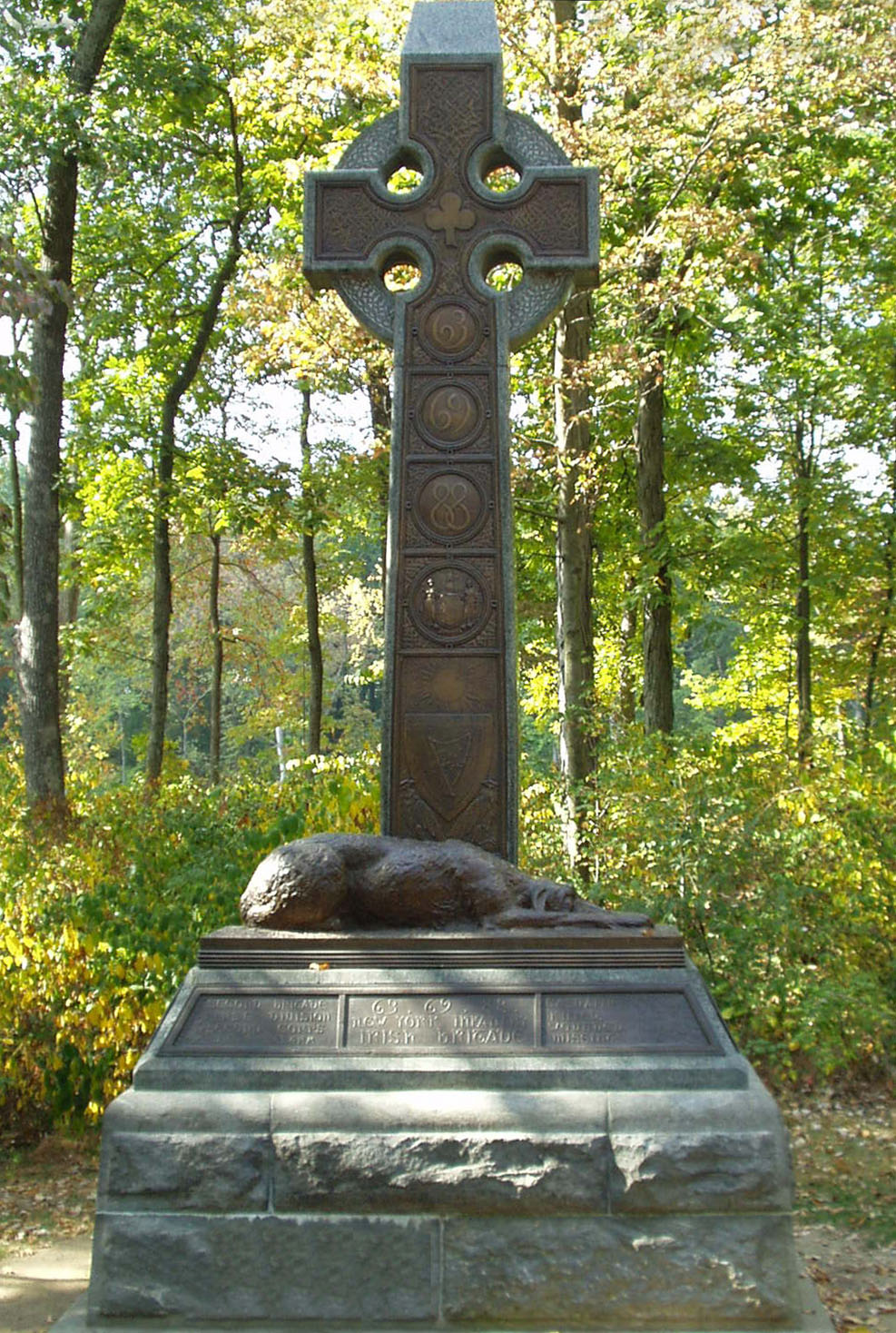
Brigade Monument at the Gettysburg battleground

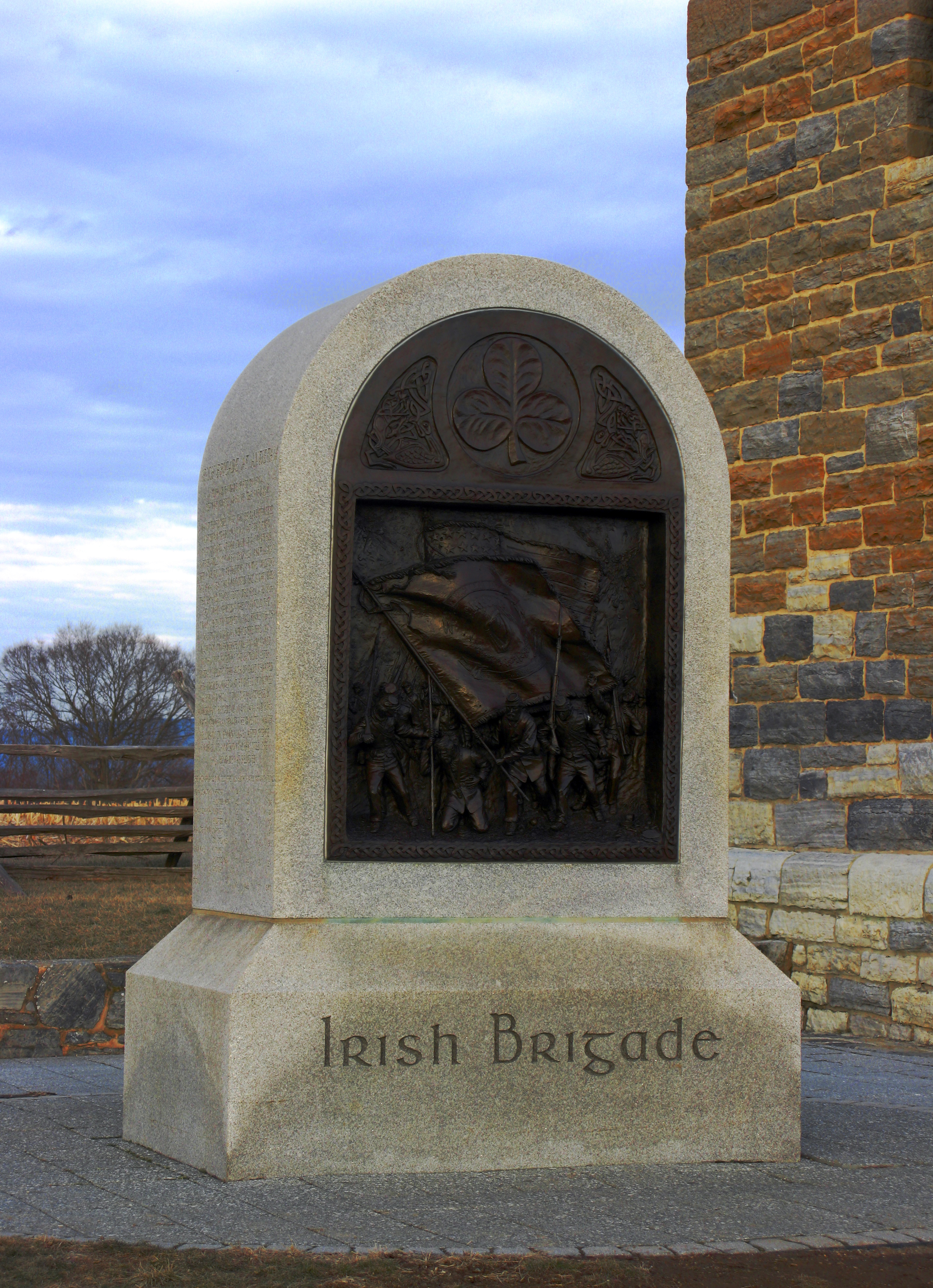
Monument at Antietam National Battlefield, dedicated in 1997 and composed of "two bronze relief sculptures set into a 20-ton tablet" of Ballyknockan granite from Ireland

On September 17, 1862, the Union and Confederate armies met at Sharpsburg, Maryland, in the Battle of Antietam. Command confusion led to the disjointed use of the II Corps, and instead of supporting renewed assaults on the Confederate left at the West Woods, the Irish Brigade found itself facing the center of the Confederate line, entrenched in an old sunken farm road. The brigade again acted conspicuously, assaulting the road, referred to after the battle as "Bloody Lane". Several Irishmen would be awarded the Medal Of Honor for dismantling some fence rails under fire. Although unsuccessful, the brigade's attack gave supporting troops enough time to flank and break the Confederate position, at the cost of 60% casualties for the Irish Brigade. the outdated Springfield muskets came in use when they used Buck n' Ball, which turned the musket into a shotgun, which was very effective at close range.

The brigade suffered its most severe casualties in December at the Battle of Fredericksburg where its fighting force was reduced from over 1600 to 1036. The brigade was involved in the northern battleground at Fredericksburg where they assaulted the sunken road in front of Marye's Heights. The brigade advanced under heavy fire, but, staying resolute, it got close to Confederate lines; however, due to staggering casualties the brigade pulled back. A shattered shell of its former self. The 69th would lose 112 effective soldiers, The 88th would suffer 121 effectives.

After the Battle of Fredericksburg, Gen. Meagher again requested to recruit the brigade back to strength. This time the request was denied. In May 1863, the brigade sustained further casualties at the Battle of Chancellorsville; Meagher repeated his request to recruit replacements, was denied, and resigned his commission in protest. He was replaced by Colonel Patrick Kelly.

Leading up to the Battle of Gettysburg, the brigade recovered several hundred of its injured from Fredericksburg and was able to field nearly 600 men - in reality, barely at regimental size. At Gettysburg, the brigade distinguished itself in the Wheatfield under the command of Col. Kelly as the 2nd Brigade of the 1st Division (Brigadier General John C. Caldwell) of the II Corps (Major General Winfield S. Hancock). Under overwhelming pressure this shattered Brigade held its ground for a lengthy period of time. The brigade has a monument on the Loop on the Gettysburg Battlefield.

While continuing to serve with distinction, casualties continued to increase and by June 1864 the Irish Brigade had been reduced to regimental size, and its commander Richard Byrne killed. The U.S. Army disbanded it and incorporated the remaining elements of the brigade into the 3rd and 4th Brigades of the 1st Division, II Corps.

A Second Irish Brigade was reformed from the old Irish Brigade of the 63rd, 69th, and 88th New York, 116th Pennsylvania, and 28th Massachusetts Regiments as well as the addition of the 7th New York Heavy Artillery (later replaced by the 4th New York Heavy Artillery in early 1865).

== Modern history ==
The lineage of the Irish Brigade has been officially assigned to "Fighting 69th" of the New York National Guard, which is the only currently active military unit that formed part of it.

The "Fighting 69th" fought in World War I as part of the Rainbow Division. For bravery displayed in Lorraine, Champagne-Marne, and Meuse-Argonne, the Medal of Honor was awarded to regiment members, including William Joseph Donovan and Richard O'Neill. By World War II, the Irish influence in the regiment had diminished somewhat, but the regiment served with distinction in the Pacific Theater as part of the 27th "New York" Infantry Division.

Since 1907, the Fighting 69th has been a unit of the New York National Guard.

In 1963 President Kennedy presented Ireland with a flag of the Irish Brigade.

1st Battalion, 69th Infantry served with distinction in Iraq from 2004-2005. The unit fought in and around Baghdad, most notably securing Route Irish and the surrounding area of Baghdad suburbs, and companies from it have since served in Afghanistan.

== In popular media ==
- James Cagney and Pat O'Brien starred in The Fighting 69th, a 1940 WWI film based on the Irish Brigade successor unit based in New York.
- In Fort Apache, Ward Bond plays a cavalry sergeant major who had served in The Irish Brigade as a major and had been awarded the Congressional Medal of Honor (likely based on St. Clair Augustine Mulholland, who earned the Medal of Honor at Chancellorsville in May 1863).
- Meagher and the Irish Brigade, as well as the charge at Marye's Heights, are featured in the novel and film Gods and Generals.
- The brigade is shown receiving general absolution from Rev. William Corby before going into battle at Gettysburg in the film Gettysburg.
- In HBO's Deadwood, George Hearst's Pinkerton henchman discusses with Al Swearengen his service in the New York 69th Regiment during the Civil War. He gives no details, but gives the impression that the outcome was not good.
- The unit was the original intended subject of a song, "Kelly's Irish Brigade", which was later adapted to refer to a Confederate unit from Missouri with an Irish commander.
- Musician David Kincaid arranged and performed two albums of Civil War era songs about Irish soldiers in the Civil War. The first The Irish Volunteer includes songs specifically about or referring to the Irish Brigade, Thomas Francis Meagher, and Michael Corcoran. The second album The Irish American's Song features a variety of songs about Irish soldiers on both the Union and Confederate sides.
- The Irish band Wolfe Tones recorded a song called The Fighting 69th which was then covered by Dropkick Murphys on their album '"The Gang's All Here." It uses the melody of "The Star of the County Down."
- The song "By the Hush", from the album of the same name by Andy M. Stewart, mentions the Irish immigrants fighting under Gen. Meagher during the Civil War.
- On their 2017 album Incorruptible, American heavy metal band Iced Earth released a song called 'Clear The Way (December 13, 1862)' about the Irish Brigade's involvement in the Battle of Fredericksburg.
- Many songs have been written about the Irish Brigade exploits during the civil war.
- In Harry Harrison's Stars and Stripes alternate history trilogy of the Civil War,the Irish Brigade is featured in the battle up the Hudson Valley against the British in the first book. It is featured prominently in the second book, Stars and Stripes in Peril, concerning the invasion of Ireland in that book.
- In HBO's Warrior, the character, Dylan Leary, states that he served in the Irish Brigade's 88th infantry in the American Civil War.
- The 66th album of the Belgian comic strip "Les Tuniques Bleues" is based on the Irish brigade. Titled “Irish Melody,” the story follows the protagonists as they discovers that Irish are fighting in the American Civil War for the Union and the Confederacy alike.
