= 28th Massachusetts Infantry Regiment =

28th Regiment Massachusetts Volunteer Infantry
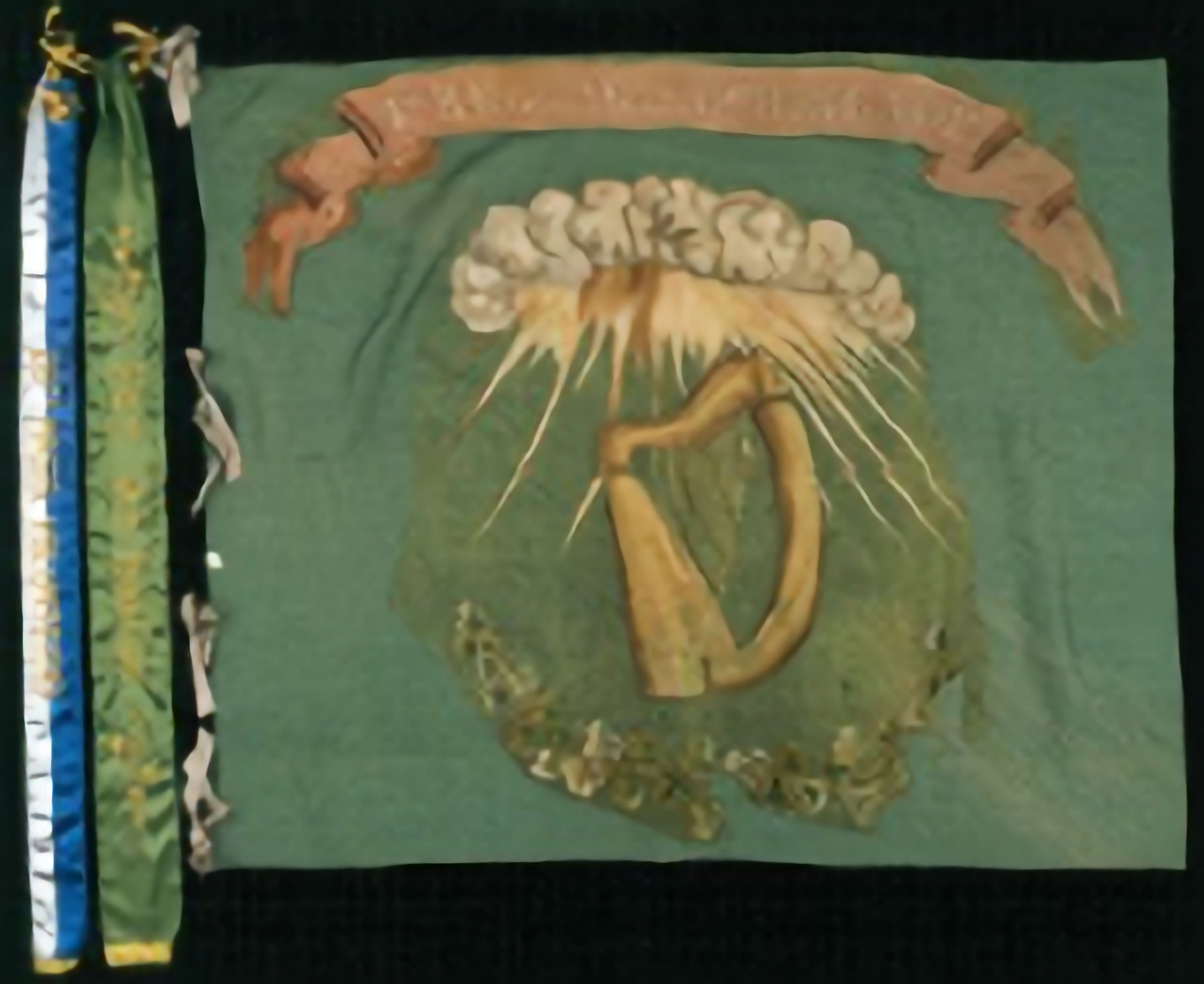
- 28th Massachusetts Irish Brigade "Tiffany" flag, presented by Brig. Gen. Thomas Francis Meagher.
- Active: December 13, 1861 – June 30, 1865
- Country: United States of America
- Allegiance: Union
- Branch: United States Army
- Type: Infantry
- Size: 1,778
- Part of: In 1863: 2nd Brigade (Meagher's), 1st Division (Hancock's), II Corps, Army of the Potomac
- Nickname: 4th Regiment of the Irish Brigade
- Motto: Faugh a Ballagh! (Clear the Way!)
- Colors: Green
- March: Garryowen
- Engagements: Battle of Secessionville; Second Battle of Bull Run; Battle of Chantilly; Battle of Antietam; Battle of Fredericksburg; Battle of Chancellorsville; Battle of Gettysburg; First Battle of Auburn; Battle of Bristoe Station; Battle of the Wilderness; Battle of Spotsylvania Court House; Battle of Cold Harbor; Siege of Petersburg; Battle of Appomattox Court House

Commanders
- Notable commanders: Col. Richard Byrnes

Insignia
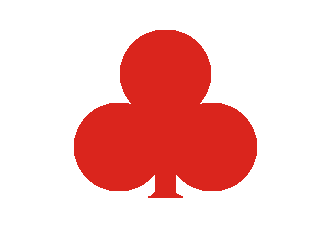
- II Corps (1st Division) badge

The 28th Massachusetts Infantry regiment was the second primarily Irish American volunteer infantry regiment recruited in Massachusetts for service in the American Civil War. The regiment's motto (or cry) was Faugh a Ballagh (Clear the Way!)

== Recruitment and training ==
The 28th was raised in Boston and received its initial training at Camp Cameron in Cambridge and Somerville. The unit underwent additional training at Fort Columbus in New York Harbor before being dispatched in early 1862 for its first active duty assignment.

== Service in the war ==
After serving briefly under Gen. Benjamin Butler in the Carolinas and with the 9th Corps during the Confederate Army of Northern Virginia's first campaign into the North, the 28th Massachusetts was assigned to the II Corps as the fourth regiment of the famed Irish Brigade, commanded by Brig. Gen. Thomas Francis Meagher.

By April 1862 the 28th was at Daufuskie Island in South Carolina. A number of companies were sent to Tybee Island, Georgia to set artillery positions. Twenty-two died of malaria and other illness. The regiment came under heavy musket and artillery fire during the Second Battle of Bull Run.

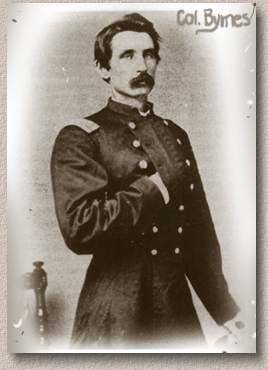
Col. Richard Byrnes

Known for their distinctive Tiffany-embroidered green flag and Gaelic war cry, "Faugh a Ballagh" (Clear the Way), the Irishmen of the 28th Massachusetts saw action in most of the Union Army's major eastern theatre engagements – Antietam, Fredericksburg, Chancellorsville, Gettysburg, the Overland Campaign, and the siege of Petersburg – and were present for Gen. Robert E. Lee's surrender to Gen. Ulysses S. Grant at Appomattox Court House.

Upon completion of their original three-year term of service, many of the 28th's veteran soldiers elected to return to Massachusetts. But a sufficient number re-enlisted by January 1, 1864, to justify the continuation of the regiment as a five-company battalion of "veteran volunteers" until the end of the war.

During the Second Battle of Bull Run, Lt. Col. George W. Cartwright was severely wounded, placing Captain Andrew P. Caraher, commander of Company A, in command of the regiment during the Maryland Campaign. Following the Battle of Antietam, however, command of the 28th Massachusetts was given on October 18 to Col. Richard Byrnes, who although himself Irish, had been a regular officer and a 1st lieutenant in the 5th U.S. Cavalry. Although resented and protested by the other officers of the regiment, Byrnes served with distinction and was wounded on June 3, 1864, while leading the Irish Brigade at the Battle of Cold Harbor. He died nine days later.

At Fredericksburg, the regiment was put in the middle of the Irish Brigade and led the charge, as they were the only regiment of the brigade that had the distinctive green flag, and since their commander wanted to make it clear to the confederates that they were facing the Irish Brigade, the 28th was planted in the middle.

Stage actor Lawrence Barrett served as captain of the regiment's Company B, but served for less than a year, resigning in August 1862. Father Lawrence Stephen McMahon was a curate at Holy Cross Church, Boston and served as chaplain from 1863 to 1865. He later became Bishop of the Diocese of Hartford.

== Casualties and mustering out ==
Among all Union regiments, the 28th Massachusetts ranked seventh in total losses. Roughly one-quarter of the 1,746 men who served in the unit were killed, died of wounds or disease, taken prisoner, or reported missing.

The surviving veterans of the regiment marched in Washington, D.C., during the Grand Review of the Armies that celebrated the war's conclusion, then traveled home to Massachusetts, where they were paid and discharged from the service at Readville in June 1865.

== See also ==
- List of Massachusetts Civil War units
- Massachusetts in the American Civil War
