= 116th Pennsylvania Infantry Regiment =

Union Army infantry regiment

116th Pennsylvania Volunteer Infantry
- Pennsylvania flag
- Active: August 1862 to July 14, 1865
- Country: United States of America
- Allegiance: Union
- Branch: Infantry
- Engagements: Battle of Fredericksburg; Battle of Chancellorsville; Battle of Gettysburg; Battle of Spotsylvania Court House; Battle of Cold Harbor; Siege of Petersburg; First Battle of Deep Bottom; Appomattox Campaign

The 116th Pennsylvania Infantry was a volunteer infantry regiment in the Union Army during the American Civil War. It formed a part of the Irish Brigade.

== History ==
The 116th Regiment, Pennsylvania Volunteer Infantry, was recruited from among the Irish Americans of Philadelphia, Pennsylvania, during the summer of 1862. Dennis Heenan served as its first colonel, St. Clair A. Mulholland as lieutenant colonel, and George H. Bardwell as major. At the end of August 1862, the regiment was ordered to report to Washington, D.C., and was assigned to the Irish Brigade, which was the 2nd Brigade, 1st Division, II Corps, Army of the Potomac. The following month, it was ordered to the Shenandoah Valley, where it saw minor skirmishing. At the Battle of Fredericksburg on December 13, the 116th charged up Marye's Heights. Despite losing many of their officers and men, including Colonel Heenan, they remained at the wall until dark. The regiment had lost so many men that it was consolidated into a battalion of four companies under the command of Mulholland.

The 116th performed well at the Battle of Chancellorsville, where it helped rescue the 5th Maine Battery from capture. In this action, Mulholland earned a Medal of Honor. On the second day of the Battle of Gettysburg, the 1st Division was sent into the Wheatfield to support the III Corps, where the 116th engaged in hand-to-hand combat. Caught in a crossfire, the division was forced to retreat. During Pickett's Charge the following day, the regiment supported the 2nd Connecticut Battery but wasn't needed in the fighting.

During the following few months, the 116th remained in northern Virginia. In the spring of 1864, Mulholland was given permission to recruit the regiment back to full strength. Enough men were raised in Philadelphia to form Companies E, F, and G in addition to bringing the four companies at the front to strength, though many of the veterans were consolidated into A Company. Companies H, I, and K were raised in Pittsburgh. Mulholland was promoted to colonel, while Richard C. Dale became lieutenant colonel and John Teed, who had been captured at Gettysburg, major.

The 116th fought all through the Overland Campaign, where it continued to lose heavily in officers and men. Mulholland was wounded at the Battle of Spotsylvania Court House and Dale was missing in action. Mulholland was wounded again at the Battle of Cold Harbor. Heavy losses continued during the Siege of Petersburg. In July, the Irish Brigade was broken up and the 116th was assigned to the 4th Brigade, 1st Division. After the Appomattox Campaign, the regiment was sent to Alexandria, where, on June 3, companies A, B, C, and D where mustered out. The remaining companies were mustered out on July 14 in Washington.

== Casualties during the war ==
- Killed and mortally wounded: 8 officers, 137 enlisted men
- Wounded: ? officers, ? enlisted men
- Died of disease: 1 officer, 88 enlisted men
- Captured or missing: ? officers, ? enlisted men
- Total casualties: 9 officers, 225 enlisted men

== See also ==
- List of Pennsylvania Civil War Units
