= William H. Morris =

Union brigadier general during the American Civil War

William Hopkins Morris
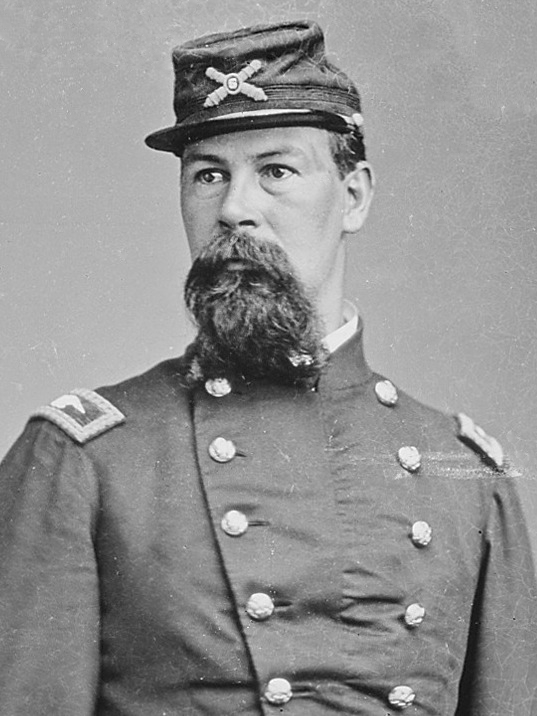
- Portrait of Norris
- Born: April 22, 1827; New York City, New York
- Died: August 26, 1900 (aged 73); Long Branch, New Jersey
- Military career
- Allegiance: United States of America
- Branch: United States Army; Union Army
- Service years: 1851–1854, 1861–1864
- Rank: Brigadier general Brevet major general

William Hopkins Morris (April 22, 1827 – August 26, 1900) was an American soldier, an officer in the United States Army, author, editor, and inventor. He served as a brigadier general of volunteers in the Union Army during the American Civil War.

== Military training and early service ==
Morris was born on April 22, 1827, in New York City to Mary and George Pope Morris. He was appointed as a cadet in the United States Military Academy at West Point July 1, 1846. Morris graduated 27th out of 42 cadets in the class of 1851.

Morris was promoted to brevet second lieutenant in the 2nd U.S. Infantry Regiment and served initially on garrison duty in 1851. In 1852, he was promoted to second lieutenant and served at Fort Yuma, California. In 1853, he was on recruiting duty and resigned his commission February 28, 1854.

== Civilian life ==
After leaving the Army, he returned to New York in 1854 and assisted his father George as the Assistant Editor of the New York Home Journal. Morris and Charles L. Brown are credited with a patent for an improved firearm with a conical cylinder holding 8 cartridges which was patented in 1860.

== Civil War ==
In August, 1861, Morris re-enlisted in the Army as a captain of volunteers. He served on the staff of Brigadier General John J. Peck as Assistant Adjutant General of Peck's brigade during the Peninsula Campaign and from June 24, 1862, to September 1, 1862, as assistant adjutant general of Division 2, IV Corps, Army of the Potomac, after Peck was appointed commander of the division. Morris participated in the Siege of Yorktown, Battle of Williamsburg and Battle of Fair Oaks.

On September 1, 1861, Morris resigned his commission in the volunteers and the following day was commissioned colonel of the 135th New York Volunteer Infantry Regiment, which was redesignated the 6th New York Heavy Artillery Regiment in October. Colonel Morris's regiment served in the Middle Department in the defense of Baltimore. On March 16, 1863, Morris was promoted to brigadier general of volunteers to rank from November 29, 1862, and served in the Middle Department from December 1862 until June 1863. During the Battle of Gettysburg, Morris's brigade was in reserve. When Major General William H. French took over command of the battered III Corps, Morris's brigade was transferred to 1st Brigade, 3rd Division, III Corps, Army of the Potomac on July 10, 1863. The 3rd Division participated in the pursuit of Lee's army after the Battle of Gettysburg, with Morris's brigade in action during the Battle of Manassas Gap on July 23, 1863. Morris served in the Bristoe Campaign from October to December 1863, and fought in the Battle of Mine Run in November 1863.

In 1864 he fought in the Battle of the Wilderness. During the Battle of Spotsylvania Court House, on the morning of May 9, 1864, he rode on horseback to inspect his brigade and was shot and wounded in the right knee by a sharpshooter. Morris was on leave of absence until June and saw no more field service after suffering his wound. From June to August 1864 he served on the Courts Martial and Military Commissions. Still suffering from his wounds, he was mustered out of service at the end of August, 1864. During this time General Morris wrote a book, Infantry Tactics, which was published in 1865.

President of the United States Andrew Johnson nominated Morris for appointment as a brevet major general of volunteers to rank from March 13, 1865, and the United States Senate confirmed the appointment on March 28, 1867.

== Later life and death ==
After the war Morris lived on his estate, Briarcliff, in Putnam County, New York. He edited the New York Home Journal. He also served at the Constitutional Convention of the State of New York, as a delegate for Putnam County in 1866. Like his father, he continued to serve in the New York State Militia, as the Chief of Ordnance of the State of New York as brigadier-general, 1869-1870 and inspector-general 1873-1874.

Charles L. Brown had died at the Battle of Malvern Hill in 1862 but Morris modified their patent with both their names and it was reissued in 1871. Morris also published a follow-on book, "Tactics for Infantry, armed with Breech-loading or Magazine Rifle" in 1879, revised in 1888. He lobbied the U.S. War Department to adopt ideas expressed in the book.

Morris died August 26, 1900, while vacationing at Long Branch, New Jersey, and is buried in Cold Spring, New York.
