= 63rd New York Infantry Regiment =

Union Army unit in the American Civil War

- New York flag
- Active: November 1861 – June 30, 1865
- Country: United States
- Allegiance: Union
- Branch: Infantry
- Nickname(s): 3rd Regiment of the Irish Brigade
- Equipment: .69 M1842 smoothbore "buck and ball"
- Engagements: American Civil War: Seven Days Battles; Battle of Antietam; Battle of Hartwood Church; Battle of Fredericksburg; Battle of Chancellorsville; Battle of Gettysburg; Battle of Bristoe Station; Mine Run Campaign; Battle of the Wilderness; Battle of Spotsylvania Courthouse; Battle of Po River; Battle of North Anna River; Battle of Totopotomoy; Battle of Cold Harbor; Siege of Petersburg; Battle of Yellow Tavern; First Battle of Deep Bottom; Battle of Strawberry Plains; Ream's Station; Hatchers Run; Appomattox Campaign

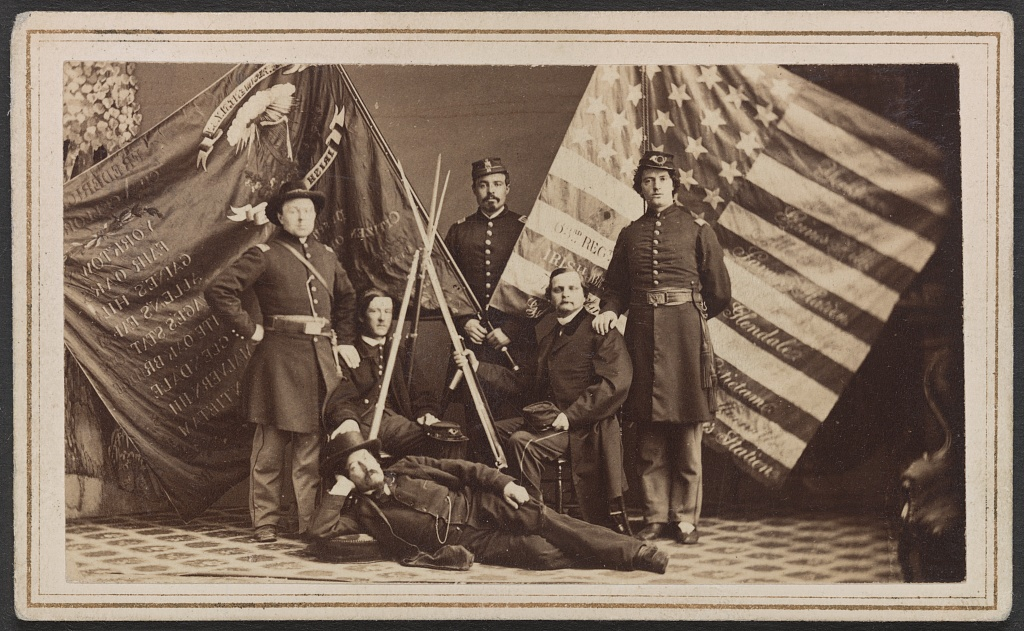
Five unidentified soldiers of the 63rd New York Infantry Regiment in uniform and one unidentified man in civilian dress with federal and state battle flags and rifle stack. From the Liljenquist Family Collection of Civil War Photographs, Prints and Photographs Division, Library of Congress

The 63rd New York Infantry Regiment was a Union Army regiment in the Irish Brigade during the American Civil War. It served in some of the leading campaigns and battles of the Army of the Potomac in the Eastern Theater of operations.

== Overview ==
Organized at New York City August 7 to November 4, 1861. Left State for Washington, D. C., November 28, 1861. Attached to Meagher's Brigade, Sumner's Division, Army of the Potomac, to March, 1862. 2nd Brigade, 1st Division, 2nd Army Corps, Army of the Potomac, to June, 1864. Consolidated Brigade, 1st Division, 2nd Army Corps, to November, 1864. 2nd Brigade, 1st Division, 2nd Army Corps, to June, 1865.

== Service ==
Duty in the Defences of Washington, D. C., November 30, 1861, to March 10, 1862. Advance on Manassas, Va., March 10–15. Ordered to the Virginia Peninsula. Siege of Yorktown, Va., April 16-May 4. Battle of Seven Pines or Fair Oaks May 31-June 1. Fair Oaks June 24. Seven days before Richmond June 25-July 1. Battles of Gaines' Mill June 27. About Fair Oaks June 28–29. Peach Orchard and Savage Station June 29. White Oak Swamp Bridge and Glendale June 30. Malvern Hill July l. At Harrison's Landing till August 16. Moved to Fortress Monroe, thence to Alexandria and Centreville August 16–30. Cover retreat of Pope's Army to Washington, D. C., August 31-September 2. Maryland Campaign September 6–22. Battle of Antietam September 16–17. Duty at Harper's Ferry, W. Va., September 22-October 29. Reconnaissance to Charlestown October 16–17. Advance up Loudoun Valley and movement to Falmouth, Va., October 29-November 17. Battle of Fredericksburg, Va., December 1–15. At Falmouth till April 27, 1863. "Mud March" January 20–24. Chancellorsville Campaign April 27-May 6. Battle of Chancellorsville May 1–5. Gettysburg (Pa.) Campaign June 11-July 24. Battle of Gettysburg, Pa., July 1–4. Duty on line of the Rappahannock till October. Advance from the Rappahannock to the Rapidan September 13–17. Bristoe Campaign October 9–22. Auburn and Bristoe October 14. Advance to line of the Rappahannock November 7–8. Mine Run Campaign November 26-December 2. Duty at and near Stevensburg, Va., till May, 1864. Demonstration on the Rapidan February 6–7. Campaign from the Rapidan to the James May 3-June 15. Battles of the Wilderness May 5–7. Spottsylvania May 8–12. Po River May 10. Spottsylvania Court House May 12–21. Assault on the Salient or "Bloody Angle" May 12. North Anna River May 23–26. On line of the Pamunkey May 26–28. Totopotomoy May 28–31. Cold Harbor June 1–12. Before Petersburg June 16–18. Siege of Petersburg June 16, 1864, to April 2, 1865. Jerusalem Plank Road June 22–23, 1864. Demonstration north of the James July 27–29. Deep Bottom July 27–28. Demonstration north of the James August 13–20. Strawberry Plains, Deep Bottom, August 14–18. Ream's Station August 25. Reconnaissance to Hatcher's Run December 9–10. Dabney's Mills, Hatcher's Run, February 5–7, 1865. Watkins' House March 25. Appomattox Campaign March 28-April 9. Hatcher's Run or Boydton Road March 29–31. White Oak Road March 31. Sutherland Station and fall of Petersburg April 2. Sailor's Creek April 6. High Bridge, Farmville, April 7. Appomattox Court House April 9. Surrender of Lee and his army. Moved to Washington, D. C., May 2–12. Grand Review May 23. Mustered out June 30, 1865.

== Losses ==
The 63rd NY lost 17 officers and 295 enlisted men during the war, for a total of 312 men.
