= 88th New York Infantry Regiment =

U.S. Civil War unit mainly composed of Irish Americans

- New York flag
- Active: November 1861 – June 30, 1865
- Country: United States
- Allegiance: Union
- Branch: Infantry
- Nicknames: Mrs. Meagher's Own, 2nd Regiment of the Irish Brigade
- Engagements: Seven Days Battles; Battle of Antietam; Battle of Fredericksburg; Battle of Chancellorsville; Battle of Gettysburg; Battle of the Wilderness; Battle of Spotsylvania Court House; Battle of Cold Harbor; Siege of Petersburg; First Battle of Deep Bottom; Appomattox Campaign

The 88th New York Infantry Regiment was a volunteer regiment in the Union Army's Irish Brigade during the American Civil War.

== History ==
=== 1861 ===
The regiment was mustered into service in the autumn of 1861 at Fort Schuyler in New York when the government approved the commissioning of an Irish Brigade. Its men were gathered in the states of New York and New Jersey from the various Irish masses of those states.

In the beginning, the 88th was not one regiment, but two. One regiment was originally the 2nd New York Infantry, the other, the 4th, respectively under the command of Colonel Baker and Colonel Thomas F. Meagher, future commander of the entire brigade. The two colonels finally reached an agreement that the two regiments should be combined into one.

When the issue arose of what number the regiment would be given, many arguments began over it. The men eventually settled on the number 88, in honor of the British Army's 88th Connaught Rangers, a unit composed of Irishmen, also where many of the now American troops received their training.

In December of that year, the unit left Fort Schuyler for Virginia. At the time of departure, the unit contained 880 men and officers. Once in Virginia, they made camp for the winter until the next year.

=== 1862 ===
In 1862, the 88th officially joined the Army of the Potomac and fought in the Seven Days Battles, Antietam, and Fredericksburg. On December 15, 1862, the 88th received their specially made “Irish Colors” shortly after the Battle of Fredericksburg, Virginia. The green regimental flag was produced especially for the Irish Brigades by Tiffany & Co.

=== Seven Days Battles ===
The 88th fought at the battles of Gaines Mill, Glendale, Savage's Station, and Malvern Hill during the Seven Days Battles in Virginia.

=== Antietam ===
At the Battle of Antietam, the Irish Brigade was one of the many brigades to charge the famous "Bloody Lane," a road that was sunken down into the ground over the years of use, now held by two Confederate brigades. The whole Irish Brigade was armed that day with M1842 .69 caliber smoothbore muskets loaded with buck and ball. The Irish Brigade did not break the Confederate line at the Bloody Lane, but fired round after round of the deadly buck-and-ball into the Confederate troops until exhausting their ammunition. The 88th and the rest of the Irish Brigade suffered 60% casualties that day.

=== Fredericksburg ===
Again, the 88th New York and the Irish Brigade would storm a heavily fortified position, this time being the hills above Fredericksburg, VA, known as Marye's Heights. The brigade was led forward by Brig. Gen. Thomas Meagher and sent forth upon the Confederate works. The 88th and their fellow Irishmen were some of the men who made it closest to their objective of the Confederate works. The 88th and the brigade were sent reeling back down the hill under unspeakably devastating artillery and small-arms fire. The Battle of Fredericksburg was again a grim day for the 88th. They suffered dozens upon dozens of casualties.

- Captain Patrick Ryder (1836-1864) KIA

=== 1863 ===
By 1863, the regiments' numbers had greatly decreased. The men had gone from nearly 900 men to about 50 in only two years.

=== Gettysburg ===
At Gettysburg, the 88th fought with the rest of the Irish Brigade, at that time under the command of Patrick Kelly in John C. Caldwell's division of Winfield Scott Hancock's II Corps. On the second day of battle, General Hancock ordered Caldwell's division to reinforce General Daniel Sickles's III Corps at the Wheatfield, Devil's Den, and the Peach Orchard. The 88th New York and the rest of the Irish Brigade took up position at the Wheatfield and held against several attacks from Confederate General James Longstreet's corps. The 88th and the rest of the brigade eventually broke, but were later considered heroes for holding out for so long.

=== 1864 ===
By 1864, the 88th had fought in many battles and their men were depleted. They launched a recruiting campaign that year and gained 400 more recruits.

=== 1865 ===
At the end of the war in 1865, the men had mustered out. The 88th was then known as the "Wolves of the Army of the Potomac."

== See also ==
- List of New York Civil War units
