= Battle of Fredericksburg order of battle: Union =

American Civil War order of battle

The following Union Army units and commanders fought in the Battle of Fredericksburg of the American Civil War. Order of battle compiled from the army organization during the campaign. The Confederate order of battle is listed separately.

== Abbreviations used ==
=== Military ranks ===
- MG = Major General
- BG = Brigadier General
- Col = Colonel
- Ltc = Lieutenant Colonel
- Maj = Major
- Cpt = Captain
- Lt = 1st Lieutenant

=== Other ===
- w = wounded
- mw = mortally wounded
- k = killed

== Army of the Potomac ==
MG Ambrose Burnside, Commanding

- Chief of Staff: MG John Parke
- Chief of Artillery: BG Henry Jackson Hunt
- Inspector General: BG Delos B. Sackett

=== General Headquarters units ===
Escort:

- Oneida (New York) Cavalry: Cpt Daniel P. Mann
- 1st U.S. Cavalry, Companies. BCH&I: Cpt Marcus A. Reno
- 4th U.S. Cavalry, Companies A and E: Cpt James B. McIntyre

Provost Guard: BG Marsena R. Patrick

- Sturgis (Illinois) Rifles: Cpt James Steel
- 22nd New Jersey
- 29th New Jersey
- 30th New Jersey
- 31st New Jersey
- 9th New York Infantry, Company G: Cpt Charles Child
- 93rd New York Infantry: Col John S. Crocker
- 147th New York
- 137th Pennsylvania
- 2nd U.S. Cavalry: Maj Charles J. Whiting
- 8th U.S. Infantry (5 companies): Cpt Royal T. Frank

Volunteer Engineer Brigade: BG Daniel Phineas Woodbury

- 15th New York Engineer Regiment: Col John M. Murphy
- 50th New York Engineer Regiment: Ltc William H. Pettes
- Battalion U.S. Engineers: Cpt James C. Duane

Artillery Reserve: Ltc William Hays

- 5th Battery, New York Light: Cpt Elijah D. Taft
- Battery A, 1st Battalion New York Light: Cpt Otto Diederichs
- Battery B, 1st Battalion New York Light: Cpt Adolph Voegelee
- Battery C, 1st Battalion New York Light: Lt Bernhard Wever
- Battery D, 1st Battalion New York Light: Cpt Charles Kusserow
- Battery K, 1st United States: Cpt William M. Graham
- Battery A, 2nd United States: Cpt John C. Tidball
- Battery G, 4th United States: Lt Marcus P. Miller
- Battery K, 5th United States: Lt David H. Kinzie
- 32nd Massachusetts Infantry, Company C: Cpt Josiah C. Fuller

Unattached Artillery: Maj Thomas S. Trumbull

- Battery B, 1st Connecticut Heavy: Cpt Albert F. Brooker
- Battery M, 1st Connecticut Heavy: Cpt Franklin A. Pratt

=== Right Grand Division ===
MG Edwin Vose Sumner

==== II Corps ====
MG Darius N. Couch

Division	Brigade	Regiments and Others
First Division MG Winfield Scott Hancock	1st Brigade BG John C. Caldwell (w); Col George W. Von Schack	5th New Hampshire: Col Edward E. Cross (w), Maj Edward E. Sturtevant (k), Cpt James E. Larkin (w), Cpt Horace T. H. Pierce; 7th New York: Col John E. Bendix (w), Lt. Col George W. von Schack, Cpt G. A. von Bransen; 61st New York: Col Nelson A. Miles (w); 64th New York: Ltc Enos C. Brooks (w); 81st Pennsylvania: Col H. Boyd McKeen (w), Cpt William Wilson; 145th Pennsylvania: Col Hiram L. Brown (w), Ltc David B. McCreary
First Division MG Winfield Scott Hancock	2nd Brigade BG Thomas F. Meagher	28th Massachusetts: Col Richard Byrnes; 63rd New York: Ltc Richard C. Bentley (w), Maj Joseph O'Neill (w), Cpt Patrick J. Condon; 69th New York: Col Robert Nugent (w), Cpt James Saunders; 88th New York: Col Patrick Kelly; 116th Pennsylvania: Col Dennis Heenan (w), Ltc St. Clair Augustine Mulholland (w), Lt Francis T. Quinlan
First Division MG Winfield Scott Hancock	3rd Brigade Col Samuel K. Zook	27th Connecticut: Col Richard S. Bostwick; 2nd Delaware: Col William P. Bailey (w); 52nd New York: Col Paul Frank; 57th New York: Ltc Alford B. Chapman (w), Maj N. Garrow Throop (mw), Cpt James W. Britt; 66th New York: Ltc James H. Bull (k), Cpt Julius Wehle (k), Cpt John S. Hammell (w), Lt James G. Derrickson; 53rd Pennsylvania: Col John R. Brooke
First Division MG Winfield Scott Hancock	Artillery	Battery B, 1st New York Light: Cpt Rufus D. Pettit; Battery C, 4th United States: Lt Evan Thomas
Second Division MG Oliver O. Howard	1st Brigade BG Alfred Sully	19th Maine: Col Frederick D. Sewall, Ltc Francis E. Heath; 15th Massachusetts: Maj Chase Philbrick (w), Cpt John Murkland, Cpt Charles H. Watson; 1st Company Massachusetts Sharpshooters: Cpt William Plumer; 1st Minnesota: Col George N. Morgan; Minnesota Sharpshooters, 2nd Company: Cpt William F. Russell; 34th New York: Col James A. Sutter; 82nd New York: Ltc James Huston
Second Division MG Oliver O. Howard	2nd Brigade Col Joshua T. Owen	69th Pennsylvania: Ltc Dennis O'Kane; 71st Pennsylvania: Ltc John Markoe; 72nd Pennsylvania: Col DeWitt C. Baxter; 106th Pennsylvania: Col Turner G. Morehead
Second Division MG Oliver O. Howard	3rd Brigade Col Norman J. Hall (w); Col William R. Lee	19th Massachusetts: Cpt H. G. O. Weymouth (w); 20th Massachusetts: Cpt George N. Macy; 7th Michigan: Ltc Henry Baxter (w), Maj Thomas J. Hunt; 42nd New York: Ltc George N. Bomford; 59th New York: Ltc William Northedge; 127th Pennsylvania: Col William W. Jennings
Second Division MG Oliver O. Howard	Artillery	Battery A, 1st Rhode Island Light: Cpt William A. Arnold; Battery B, 1st Rhode Island Light: Cpt John G. Hazard
Third Division MG William H. French	1st Brigade BG Nathan Kimball (w); Col John S. Mason	14th Indiana: Maj Elijah H. C. Cavins; 24th New Jersey: Col William B. Robertson; 28th New Jersey: Col Moses N. Wisewell (w), Ltc E. A. L. Roberts; 4th Ohio: Col John S. Mason, Ltc James H. Godman (w), Cpt Gordon A. Stewart; 8th Ohio: Ltc Franklin Sawyer; 7th West Virginia: Col Joseph Snider (w), Ltc Jonathan H. Lockwood
Third Division MG William H. French	2nd Brigade Col Oliver H. Palmer	14th Connecticut: Ltc Sanford H. Perkins (w), Cpt Samuel H. Davis; 108th New York: Ltc Charles J. Powers; 130th Pennsylvania: Col Henry I. Zinn (k), Cpt William M. Porter
Third Division MG William H. French	3rd Brigade Col John W. Andrews; Ltc William Jameson; Ltc John W. Marshall	1st Delaware: Maj Thomas A. Smyth; 4th New York: Col John D. MacGregor (w), Ltc William Jameson, Maj Charles W. Kruger; 10th New York: Col John E. Bendix (w), Cpt Salmon Winchester (mw), Cpt George F. Hopper; 132nd Pennsylvania: Ltc Charles Albright
Third Division MG William H. French	Artillery	Battery G, 1st New York Light: Cpt John D. Frank; Battery G, 1st Rhode Island Light: Cpt Charles D. Owen
Corps Artillery Reserve Cpt Charles H. Morgan		Battery I, 1st United States: Lt Edmund Kirby; Battery A, 4th United States: Lt Rufus King, Jr.

==== IX Corps ====
BG Orlando B. Willcox

Escort

- 6th New York Cavalry, Company B: Cpt Hillman A. Hall
- 6th New York Cavalry, Company C: Cpt William L. Heermance

Division	Brigade	Regiments and Others
First Division BG William W. Burns	1st Brigade Col Orlando Poe	2nd Michigan: Ltc Louis Dillman; 17th Michigan: Col William H. Withington; 20th Michigan: Col Adolphus W. Williams; 79th New York: Ltc David Morrison
First Division BG William W. Burns	2nd Brigade Col Benjamin C. Christ	29th Massachusetts: Ltc Joseph H. Barnes; 8th Michigan: Maj Ralph Ely; 27th New Jersey: Col George W. Mindil; 46th New York: Ltc Joseph P. Gerhardt; 50th Pennsylvania: Ltc Thomas S. Brenholtz
First Division BG William W. Burns	3rd Brigade Col Daniel Leasure	36th Massachusetts: Col Henry Bowman; 45th Pennsylvania: Col Thomas Welsh; 100th Pennsylvania: Ltc David A. Leckey
First Division BG William W. Burns	Artillery	Battery D, 1st New York Light: Cpt Thomas W. Osborn; Batteries L and M, 3rd United States: Lt Horace J. Hayden
Second Division BG Samuel D. Sturgis	1st Brigade BG James Nagle	2nd Maryland: Col Thomas B. Allard; 6th New Hampshire: Col Simon Goodell Griffin; 9th New Hampshire: Ltc John W. Babbitt; 48th Pennsylvania: Col Joshua K. Sigfried; 7th Rhode Island: Col Zenas Bliss; 12th Rhode Island: Col George H. Browne
Second Division BG Samuel D. Sturgis	2nd Brigade BG Edward Ferrero	21st Massachusetts: Col William S. Clark; 35th Massachusetts: Maj Sidney Willard (mw), Cpt Stephen H. Andrews; 11th New Hampshire: Col Walter Harriman; 51st New York: Col Robert Brown Potter; 51st Pennsylvania: Col John F. Hartranft
Second Division BG Samuel D. Sturgis	Artillery	Battery L, 2nd New York Light: Cpt Jacob Roemer; Battery D, Pennsylvania Light: Cpt George W. Durell; Battery D, 1st Rhode Island Light: Cpt William W. Buckley; Battery E, 4th United States: Lt George Dickenson (k), Lt John Egan
Third Division BG George W. Getty	1st Brigade Col Rush C. Hawkins	10th New Hampshire: Col Michael T. Donohoe; 13th New Hampshire: Col Aaron Fletcher Stevens; 25th New Jersey: Col Andrew Derrom; 9th New York: Ltc Edgar A. Kimball; 89th New York: Col Harrison S. Fairchild; 103rd New York: Col Benjamin Ringold
Third Division BG George W. Getty	2nd Brigade Col Edward Harland	8th Connecticut: Maj John E. Ward, Cpt Henry M. Hoyt; 11th Connecticut: Col Griffin Alexander Stedman, Jr.; 15th Connecticut: Ltc Samuel Tolles; 16th Connecticut: Cpt Charles L. Upham; 21st Connecticut: Col Arthur H. Dutton; 4th Rhode Island: Ltc Joseph B. Curtis (k), Maj Martin P. Buffum
Third Division BG George W. Getty	Artillery	Battery E, 2nd United States: Lt Samuel N. Benjamin; Battery A, 5th United States: Lt James Gilliss

==== Cavalry Division ====
BG Alfred Pleasonton

Brigade	Regiments
1st Brigade BG John F. Farnsworth	8th Illinois Cavalry: Col William Gamble; 3rd Indiana Cavalry: Maj George H. Chapman; 8th New York Cavalry: Col Benjamin Franklin Davis
2nd Brigade Col David M. Gregg; Col Thomas Devin	6th New York Cavalry: Col Thomas C. Devin, Ltc Duncan McVicar; 8th Pennsylvania Cavalry: Ltc Amos E. Griffiths; 6th United States Cavalry: Cpt George C. Cram
Horse Artillery	Battery M, 2nd United States: Lt Alexander C. M. Pennington, Jr.

=== Center Grand Division ===
MG Joseph Hooker

==== III Corps ====
BG George Stoneman

Division	Brigade	Regiments and Others
First Division BG David B. Birney	1st Brigade BG John C. Robinson	20th Indiana: Col John Van Valkenburg; 63rd Pennsylvania: Maj John A. Danks; 68th Pennsylvania: Col Andrew H. Tippin; 105th Pennsylvania: Col Amor A. McKnight; 114th Pennsylvania: Col Charles H. T. Collis; 141st Pennsylvania: Col Henry J. Madill
First Division BG David B. Birney	2nd Brigade BG J. H. Hobart Ward	3rd Maine: Col Moses B. Lakeman; 4th Maine: Col Elijah Walker; 38th New York: Ltc William Birney (w); 40th New York: Ltc Nelson A. Gesner (w); 55th New York: Col Régis de Trobriand; 57th Pennsylvania: Col Charles T. Campbell (w), Ltc Peter Sides; 99th Pennsylvania: Col Asher S. Leidy (w), Ltc Edwin Ruthwin Biles
First Division BG David B. Birney	3rd Brigade BG Hiram G. Berry	17th Maine: Col Thomas A. Roberts; 3rd Michigan: Maj Moses B. Houghton; 5th Michigan: Ltc John Gilluly (k), Maj Edward T. Sherlock; 1st New York: Col J. Frederick Pierson; 37th New York: Col Samuel B. Hayman; 101st New York: Col George F. Chester
First Division BG David B. Birney	Artillery Cpt George E. Randolph	Battery E, 1st Rhode Island Light: Lt Pardon S. Jastram; Batteries F and K, 3rd United States: Lt John G. Turnbull
Second Division BG Daniel Sickles	1st Brigade BG Joseph B. Carr	1st Massachusetts: Ltc Clark B. Baldwin, Col Napoleon B. McLaughlen; 11th Massachusetts: Col William E. Blaisdell; 16th Massachusetts: Col Thomas R. Tannatt; 2nd New Hampshire: Col Gilman Marston; 11th New Jersey: Col Robert McAllister; 26th Pennsylvania: Ltc Benjamin C. Tilghman
Second Division BG Daniel Sickles	2nd Brigade Col George B. Hall	70th New York: Col J. Egbert Farnum; 71st New York: Maj Thomas Rafferty; 72nd New York: Col William O. Stevens; 73rd New York: Col William R. Brewster; 74th New York: Ltc William H. Lounsbury; 120th New York: Col George H. Sharpe
Second Division BG Daniel Sickles	3rd Brigade BG Joseph W. Revere	5th New Jersey: Col William J. Sewell; 6th New Jersey: Col George C. Burling; 7th New Jersey: Col Louis R. Francine; 8th New Jersey: Col Adolphus J. Johnson; 2nd New York: Col Sidney W. Park; 115th Pennsylvania: Ltc William A. Olmsted
Second Division BG Daniel Sickles	Artillery Cpt James E. Smith	Battery B, 1st New Jersey Light Artillery: Cpt A. Judson Clark; 4th Battery, New York Light: Lt Joseph E. Nairn; Battery H, 1st United States: Lt Justin E. Dimick; Battery K, 4th United States: Lt Francis W. Seeley
Third Division BG Amiel W. Whipple	1st Brigade BG Abram S. Piatt; Col Emlen Franklin	86th New York: Ltc Bena J. Chapin; 124th New York: Col Augustus van Horne Ellis; 122nd Pennsylvania: Col Emlen Franklin
Third Division BG Amiel W. Whipple	2nd Brigade Col Samuel S. Carroll	12th New Hampshire: Col Joseph H. Potter; 163rd New York: Maj James J. Byrne; 84th Pennsylvania: Col Samuel M. Bowman; 110th Pennsylvania: Ltc James Crowther
Third Division BG Amiel W. Whipple	Artillery	10th Battery, New York Light: Cpt John T. Bruen; 11th Battery, New York Light: Cpt Albert A. Von Puttkammer; Battery H, 1st Ohio Light: Lt George W. Norton

==== V Corps ====
MG Daniel Butterfield

Division	Brigade	Regiments and Others
First Division BG Charles Griffin	1st Brigade Col James Barnes	2nd Maine: Ltc George Varney (w), Maj Daniel F. Sargent; Massachusetts Sharpshooters, 2nd Company: Cpt Lewis E. Wentworth; 18th Massachusetts: Ltc Joseph Hayes; 22nd Massachusetts: Ltc William S. Tilton; 1st Michigan: Ltc Ira C. Abbott (w); 13th New York: Col Elisha Marshall (w), Ltc Francis A. Schoeffel; 25th New York: Cpt Patrick Connelly; 118th Pennsylvania: Ltc James Gwyn
First Division BG Charles Griffin	2nd Brigade Col Jacob B. Sweitzer	9th Massachusetts: Col Patrick Robert Guiney; 32nd Massachusetts: Col Francis J. Parker; 4th Michigan: Ltc George W. Lumbard; 14th New York: Ltc Thomas M. Davies; 62nd Pennsylvania: Ltc James C. Hull
First Division BG Charles Griffin	3rd Brigade Col T.B.W. Stockton	20th Maine: Col Adelbert Ames, Ltc Joshua L. Chamberlain; Michigan Sharpshooters, Brady's Company: Lt Jonas H. Titus Jr.; 16th Michigan: Ltc Norval E. Welch; 12th New York: Ltc Robert M. Richardson; 17th New York: Cpt John Vickers; 44th New York: Ltc Freeman Conner (w), Maj Edward B. Knox; 83rd Pennsylvania: Col Strong Vincent
First Division BG Charles Griffin	Artillery	3rd Massachusetts Light: Cpt Augustus Pearl Martin; 5th Battery (E), Massachusetts Light: Cpt Charles A. Phillips; Battery C, 1st Rhode Island Light: Cpt Richard Waterman; Battery D, 5th United States: Lt Charles E. Hazlett
First Division BG Charles Griffin	Sharpshooters	1st United States: Ltc Casper Trepp
Second Division MG George Sykes	1st Brigade Ltc Robert C. Buchanan	3rd United States: Cpt John D. Wilkins; 4th United States: Cpt Hiram Dryer; 12th United States, 1st Battalion: Cpt Matthew M. Blunt; 12th United States, 2nd Battalion: Cpt Thomas M. Anderson; 14th United States, 1st Battalion: Cpt John D. O'Connell; 14th United States, 2nd Battalion: Cpt Giles B. Overton
Second Division MG George Sykes	2nd Brigade Maj George L. Andrews; Maj Charles S. Lovell	1st United States and 2nd United States (battalion): Cpt Salem S. Marsh; 6th United States: Cpt Levi C. Bootes; 7th United States (battalion): Cpt David P. Hancock; 10th United States: Cpt Henry E. Maynadier; 11th United States: Cpt Charles S. Russell; 17th and 19th United States (battalion): Cpt John P. Wales
Second Division MG George Sykes	3rd Brigade BG Gouverneur K. Warren	5th New York: Col Cleveland Winslow; 140th New York: Col Patrick O'Rorke; 146th New York: Col Kenner Garrard
Second Division MG George Sykes	Artillery	Battery L, 1st Ohio Light: Lt Frederick Dorries; Battery I, 5th United States: Lt Malbone F. Watson
Third Division BG Andrew A. Humphreys	1st Brigade BG Erastus B. Tyler	91st Pennsylvania: Col Edgar M. Gregory (w); 126th Pennsylvania: Col James G. Elder (w), Ltc David W. Rowe; 129th Pennsylvania: Col Jacob G. Frick; 134th Pennsylvania: Ltc Edward O'Brien
Third Division BG Andrew A. Humphreys	2nd Brigade Col Peter H. Allabach	123rd Pennsylvania: Col John B. Clark; 131st Pennsylvania: Ltc William B. Shaut; 133rd Pennsylvania: Col Franklin B. Speakman; 155th Pennsylvania: Col Edward J. Allen
Third Division BG Andrew A. Humphreys	Artillery	Battery C, 1st New York Light: Lt William H. Phillips; Batteries E and G, 1st United States: Cpt Alanson Merwin Randol
Cavalry Brigade BG William W. Averell		1st Massachusetts Cavalry: Col Horace B. Sargent; 3rd Pennsylvania Cavalry: Ltc Edward S. Jones; 4th Pennsylvania Cavalry: Col James K. Kerr; 5th United States Cavalry: Cpt James E. Harrison
Artillery		Batteries B and L, 2nd United States: Cpt James M. Robertson

=== Left Grand Division ===
MG William B. Franklin

Escort

- 6th Pennsylvania Cavalry: Col Richard H. Rush

==== I Corps ====
MG John F. Reynolds

Escort

- 1st Maine Cavalry, Company L: Cpt Constantine Taylor

Division	Brigade	Regiments and Others
First Division BG Abner Doubleday	1st Brigade Col Walter Phelps, Jr.	22nd New York: Ltc John McKie, Jr.; 24th New York: Ltc Samuel R. Beardsley; 30th New York: Ltc Morgan H. Chrysler; 84th New York: Ltc William H. de Bevoise; 2nd U.S. Sharpshooters: Maj Homer R. Stoughton
First Division BG Abner Doubleday	2nd Brigade Col James Gavin	7th Indiana: Ltc John F. Cheek; 76th New York: Col William P. Wainwright; 95th New York: Col George H. Biddle; 56th Pennsylvania: Ltc John William Hofmann
First Division BG Abner Doubleday	3rd Brigade Col William F. Rogers	21st New York: Cpt George N. Layton; 23rd New York: Col Henry C. Hoffman; 35th New York: Col Newton B. Lord; 80th New York: Ltc Jacob B. Hardenbergh
First Division BG Abner Doubleday	4th Brigade BG Solomon Meredith; Col Lysander Cutler	19th Indiana: Ltc Samuel J. Williams; 24th Michigan: Col Henry A. Morrow; 2nd Wisconsin: Col Lucius Fairchild; 6th Wisconsin: Col Lysander Cutler, Ltc Edward S. Bragg; 7th Wisconsin: Col William W. Robinson
First Division BG Abner Doubleday	Artillery Cpt George A. Gerrish (w); Cpt John A. Reynolds	1st Battery, New Hampshire Light: Lt Frederick M. Edgell; Battery L, 1st New York Light: Cpt John A. Reynolds; Battery B, 4th United States: Lt James Stewart
Second Division BG John Gibbon (w); BG Nelson Taylor	1st Brigade Col Adrian R. Root	16th Maine: Ltc Charles W. Tilden; 94th New York: Maj John A. Kress; 104th New York: Maj Gilbert G. Prey; 105th New York: Maj Daniel A. Sharp (w), Cpt Abraham Moore; 107th Pennsylvania: Col Thomas F. McCoy
Second Division BG John Gibbon (w); BG Nelson Taylor	2nd Brigade Col Peter Lyle	12th Massachusetts: Col James L. Bates; 26th New York: Ltc Gilbert S. Jennings (w), Maj Ezra F. Wetmore; 90th Pennsylvania: Ltc William A. Leech; 136th Pennsylvania: Col Thomas McKee Bayne
Second Division BG John Gibbon (w); BG Nelson Taylor	3rd Brigade BG Nelson Taylor; Col Samuel H. Leonard	13th Massachusetts: Col Samuel H. Leonard, Ltc N. Walter Batchelder; 83rd New York: Cpt John Hendrickson (w), Cpt Joseph A. Moesch (w), Lt Isaac E. Hoagland, Lt Henry P. Claire; 97th New York: Col Charles Wheelock; 11th Pennsylvania: Col Richard Coulter (w), Cpt Christian Kuhn; 88th Pennsylvania: Maj David A. Griffith
Second Division BG John Gibbon (w); BG Nelson Taylor	Artillery Cpt George F. Leppien	2nd Battery, Maine Light: Cpt James A. Hall; 5th Battery, Maine Light: Cpt George F. Leppien; Battery C, Pennsylvania Light: Cpt James Thompson; Battery F, 1st Pennsylvania Light: Lt R. Bruce Ricketts
Third Division MG George Meade	1st Brigade Col William Sinclair (w); Col William McCandless	1st Pennsylvania Reserves: Cpt William C. Talley; 2nd Pennsylvania Reserves: Col William McCandless, Cpt Timothy Mealey; 6th Pennsylvania Reserves: Maj Wellington H. Ent; 13th Pennsylvania Reserves (1st Rifles): Cpt Charles F. Taylor (w), Cpt Edward Irvin (w); 121st Pennsylvania: Col Chapman Biddle
Third Division MG George Meade	2nd Brigade Col Albert L. Magilton	3rd Pennsylvania Reserves: Col Horatio G. Sickel; 4th Pennsylvania Reserves: Ltc Richard H. Woolworth; 7th Pennsylvania Reserves: Col Henry C. Bolinger (w); 8th Pennsylvania Reserves: Maj Silas M. Baily; 142nd Pennsylvania: Col Robert P. Cummins
Third Division MG George Meade	3rd Brigade BG Conrad Feger Jackson (k); Col Joseph W. Fisher; Ltc Robert Anderson	5th Pennsylvania Reserves: Col Joseph W. Fisher, Ltc George Dare (w), Maj Frank Zentemeyer (mw); 9th Pennsylvania Reserves: Ltc Robert Anderson, Maj James M. Snodgrass; 10th Pennsylvania Reserves: Maj James B. Knox; 11th Pennsylvania Reserves: Ltc Samuel M. Jackson; 12th Pennsylvania Reserves: Cpt Richard Gustin
Third Division MG George Meade	Artillery	Battery A, 1st Pennsylvania Light: Lt John G. Simpson; Battery B, 1st Pennsylvania Light: Cpt James H. Cooper; Battery G, 1st Pennsylvania Light: Cpt Frank P. Amsden; Battery C, 5th United States: Cpt Dunbar R. Ransom

==== VI Corps ====
MG William F. Smith

Escort

- 10th New York Cavalry, Company L: Lt George Vanderbilt
- 6th Pennsylvania Cavalry, Company I: Cpt James Starr
- 6th Pennsylvania Cavalry, Company K: Cpt Frederick C. Newhall

Division	Brigade	Regiments and Others
First Division BG William T. H. Brooks	1st Brigade Col Alfred Thomas Torbert	1st New Jersey: Ltc Mark W. Collet; 2nd New Jersey: Col Samuel L. Buck; 3rd New Jersey: Col Henry W. Brown; 4th New Jersey: Col William B. Hatch (w), Ltc James N. Duffy; 15th New Jersey: Ltc Edward L. Campbell; 23rd New Jersey: Col Henry O. Ryerson
First Division BG William T. H. Brooks	2nd Brigade Col Henry L. Cake	5th Maine: Col Edward A. Scammon; 16th New York: Col Joel J. Seaver; 27th New York: Col Alexander D. Adams; 121st New York: Col Emory Upton; 96th Pennsylvania: Ltc Peter A. Filbert
First Division BG William T. H. Brooks	3rd Brigade BG David Allen Russell	18th New York: Col George R. Myers; 31st New York: Ltc Leopold C. Newman; 32nd New York: Col Francis E. Pinto; 95th Pennsylvania: Ltc Elisha Hall
First Division BG William T. H. Brooks	Artillery	Battery A, Maryland Light: Cpt John W. Wolcott; 1st Battery (A), Massachusetts Light: Cpt William H. McCarthey; Battery A, 1st New Jersey Light: Cpt William Hexamer; Battery D, 2nd United States: Lt Edward B. Williston
Second Division BG Albion P. Howe	1st Brigade BG Calvin E. Pratt	6th Maine: Col Hiram Burnham; 43rd New York: Col Benjamin F. Baker; 49th Pennsylvania: Col William H. Irwin; 119th Pennsylvania: Col Peter C. Ellmaker; 5th Wisconsin: Col Amasa Cobb
Second Division BG Albion P. Howe	2nd Brigade Col Henry Whiting	26th New Jersey: Col Andrew J. Morrison; 2nd Vermont: Ltc Charles H. Joyce; 3rd Vermont: Col Breed N. Hyde; 4th Vermont: Col Charles B. Stoughton; 5th Vermont: Col Lewis A. Grant; 6th Vermont: Col Nathan Lord, Jr.
Second Division BG Albion P. Howe	3rd Brigade BG Francis L. Vinton (w); Col Robert F. Taylor; BG Thomas H. Neill	21st New Jersey: Col Gilliam Van Houten; 20th New York: Col Ernst von Vegesack; 33rd New York: Col Robert F. Taylor; 49th New York: Col Daniel D. Bidwell; 77th New York: Ltc Winsor B. French
Second Division BG Albion P. Howe	Artillery	Battery B, Maryland Light: Cpt Alonzo Snow; 1st Battery, New York Light: Cpt Andrew Cowan; 3rd Battery, New York Light: Lt William A. Harn; Battery F, 5th United States: Lt Leonard Martin
Third Division BG John Newton	1st Brigade BG John Cochrane	65th New York: Col Alexander Shaler; 67th New York: Col Nelson Cross; 122nd New York: Col Silas Titus; 23rd Pennsylvania: Maj John F. Glenn; 61st Pennsylvania: Col George C. Spear; 82nd Pennsylvania: Col David H. Williams
Third Division BG John Newton	2nd Brigade BG Charles Devens	7th Massachusetts: Ltc Franklin P. Harlow; 10th Massachusetts: Col Henry L. Eustis; 37th Massachusetts: Col Oliver Edwards; 36th New York: Col William H. Browne; 2nd Rhode Island: Col Frank Wheaton, Ltc Nelson Viall
Third Division BG John Newton	3rd Brigade Col Thomas A. Rowley; BG Frank Wheaton	62nd New York: Maj Wilson Hubbell; 93rd Pennsylvania: Maj John M. Mark; 98th Pennsylvania: Ltc Adolph Mehler; 102nd Pennsylvania: Ltc Joseph M. Kinkead; 139th Pennsylvania: Ltc James D. Owens
Third Division BG John Newton	Artillery	Battery C, 1st Pennsylvania Light: Cpt Jeremiah McCarthy; Battery D, 1st Pennsylvania Light: Cpt Michael Hall; Battery G, 2nd United States: Lt John H. Butler
Cavalry Brigade BG George D. Bayard (k); Col David McM. Gregg		District of Columbia Cavalry, Independent Company: Lt William H. Orton [Orten?]; 1st Maine Cavalry: Ltc Calvin S. Douty; 1st New Jersey Cavalry: Ltc Joseph Kargé; 2nd New York Cavalry: Maj Henry E. Davies; 10th New York Cavalry: Ltc William Irvine; 1st Pennsylvania Cavalry: Col Owen Jones
Artillery		Battery C, 3rd United States: Cpt Horatio G. Gibson

=== Reserve Grand Division ===
Further information:

- National Park Service: Fredericksburg & Spotsylvania National Military Park (Fredericksburg Union order of battle: Reserve Grand Division).
- Official Records, Series I, Volume XXI, Part 1, pages 935-938.

==== XI Corps ====
BG Julius Stahel

Division	Brigade	Regiments and Others
First Division BG Nathaniel C. McLean	1st Brigade; Col Leopold Von Gilsa	8th New York: Col Felix Salm-Salm; 41st New York: Ltc Ernst Von Holmstedt; 45th New York: Ltc George von Amsberg; 54th New York: Cpt Charles Wahle; 153rd Pennsylvania: Col Charles Glanz
First Division BG Nathaniel C. McLean	2nd Brigade BG Nathaniel C. McLean	17th Connecticut: Col William H. Noble; 25th Ohio: Col William P. Richardson; 55th Ohio: Col John C. Lee; 75th Ohio: Ltc Robert A. Constable; 107th Ohio: Col Seraphim Meyer
First Division BG Nathaniel C. McLean	Cavalry Brigade Col Luigi Palma Di Cesnola	Connecticut Cavalry, 1st Battalion: Cpt Charles Farnsworth; 4th New York Cavalry: Maj Alfred W. Taylor, 9th New York Cavalry: Maj Edgar A. Kimball; 6th Ohio Cavalry: Cpt J. H. Cryer
First Division BG Nathaniel C. McLean	Artillery Cpt William L. De Beck	2nd New York Battery: Cpt Louis Schirmer; 13th New York Battery: Cpt Julius Dieckmann; 1st Ohio, Company K: Cpt William L. De Beck
Second Division BG Adolph Von Steinwehr	1st Brigade Col Adolphus Buschbeck	29th New York: Maj U. Gullman; 154th New York: Col Patrick H. Jones; 27th Pennsylvania: Ltc Lorenz Cantador; 73rd Pennsylvania: Col Gustavus A. Muhleck
Second Division BG Adolph Von Steinwehr	2nd Brigade Col Orland Smith	33rd Massachusetts: Col Albert C. Maggi; 134th New York: Col Charles R. Coster; 136th New York: Ltc Lester B. Faulkner; 73rd Ohio: Ltc Richard Long
Second Division BG Adolph Von Steinwehr	Artillery	1st New York, Battery I: Cpt M. Wiedrich; 12th Ohio Battery: Cpt Aaron C. Johnson
Third Division BG Carl Schurz	1st Brigade Col Alexander Schimmelfennig	82nd Illinois: Col Friedrich Hecker; 68th New York: Maj C. Von Wedell; 157th New York: Col Philip P. Brown, Jr.; 61st Ohio: Col Stephen J. McGroarty; 74th Pennsylvania: Maj A. Von Hartung; 1st Ohio Light Artillery, Battery I: Cpt Hubert Dilger
Third Division BG Carl Schurz	2nd Brigade Col Włodzimierz Krzyżanowski	58th New York: Ltc Frederick Gellman; 119th New York: Col Elias Peissner; 75th Pennsylvania: Col Francis Mahler; 26th Wisconsin: Col William H. Jacobs; 1st West Virginia Artillery, Battery C: Cpt Wallace Hill
Unattached		1st Indiana Cavalry (two companies): Cpt Theodore Majtheny; 82nd Ohio: Ltc David Thompson; 17th Pennsylvania Cavalry: Col Josiah H. Kellogg; 3rd West Virginia Cavalry (2 companies): Cpt S. B. Conger

==== XII Corps ====
MG Henry Warner Slocum

Escort

- 12th Illinois Cavalry, Company A: Cpt P. E. Fisher

Division	Brigade	Regiments and Others
First Division BG Alpheus S. Williams	1st Brigade; Col Joseph F. Knipe	5th Connecticut: Col George D. Chapman; 10th Maine: Col George Lafayette Beal; 28th New York: Ltc E. W. Cook; 46th Pennsylvania: Ltc James L. Selfridge; 128th Pennsylvania: Col Joseph A. Mathews
First Division BG Alpheus S. Williams	2nd Brigade BG Thomas L. Kane	20th Connecticut: Col Samuel Ross; 123rd New York: Col Archibald L. McDougall; 124th Pennsylvania: Col Joseph W. Hawley; 125th Pennsylvania: Col Jacob C. Higgins
First Division BG Alpheus S. Williams	3rd Brigade BG John K. Murphy	27th Indiana: Col Silas Colgrove; 2nd Massachusetts: Maj Charles R. Mudge; 13th New Jersey: Col Ezra A. Carman; 107th New York: Col Alexander S. Diven; 29th Pennsylvania: Maj Michael Scott; 3rd Wisconsin: Ltc William Hawley
First Division BG Alpheus S. Williams	Artillery Cpt Robert H. Fitzugh	1st New York, Battery K: Lt Edward L. Bailey; 1st New York, Battery M: Lt Charles E. Winegar; 4th United States, Battery F: Lt Edward D. Muhlenberg
First Division BG Alpheus S. Williams	Cavalry	1st Maine Cavalry, Company H: Cpt George S. Summat; 1st Michigan Cavalry, Company L: Cpt Melvin Brewer
Second Division BG John W. Geary	1st Brigade BG Charles Candy	5th Ohio: Col John H. Patrick; 7th Ohio: Col William R. Creigton; 29th Ohio: Col Lewis P. Buckley; 66th Ohio: Ltc Eugene Powell; 28th Pennsylvania: Cpt Joseph B. Copeland; 147th Pennsylvania: Ltc Ario Pardee, Jr.; 12th Illinois Cavalry: Col Hasbrouck Davis; 1st Maryland Cavalry (3 companies): Cpt J. H. Cook
Second Division BG John W. Geary	2nd Brigade Col Joseph M. Sudsburg	3rd Maryland: Ltc Gilbert P. Robinson; 60th New York: Ltc John C. O. Redington; 145th New York: Maj Roswell L. Van Wagenen
Second Division BG John W. Geary	3rd Brigade BG George S. Greene	78th New York: Maj H. C. Blanchard; 102nd New York: Ltc James C. Lane; 137th New York: Col David Ireland; 149th New York: Maj Abel G. Cook; 109th Pennsylvania: Col Henry J. Stainrook; 111th Pennsylvania: Ltc George A. Cobham, Jr.
Second Division BG John W. Geary	Artillery Maj L. Kieffer	6th Maine Battery: Lt Edwin B. Dow; Pennsylvania Battery E: Cpt J. M. Knap; Pennsylvania Battery F: Cpt R. B. Hampton
Second Division BG John W. Geary	Cavalry	1st Maine Cavalry, Company M: Cpt G. M. Brown
