= Battle of Chancellorsville order of battle: Union =

The following Union Army units and commanders fought in the Battle of Chancellorsville of the American Civil War. The Confederate order of battle is listed separately. Order of battle compiled from the army organization (Note: Multiple commander names indicate command succession of command during the battle or the campaign.) during the battle, the casualty returns, and the reports.

== Abbreviations used ==
=== Military rank ===
- MG = Major General
- BG = Brigadier General
- Col = Colonel
- Ltc = Lieutenant Colonel
- Maj = Major
- Cpt = Captain
- Lt = Lieutenant

=== Other ===
- w = wounded
- mw = mortally wounded
- k = killed
- c = captured

== Army of the Potomac ==
MG Joseph Hooker

=== General Staff and Headquarters ===
General Staff:

- Chief of Staff: MG Daniel Butterfield
- Assistant Adjutant General: BG Seth Williams
- Chief Quartermaster: BG Rufus Ingalls
- Chief of Engineers: BG Gouverneur K. Warren
- Bureau of Military Information: Col George H. Sharpe
- Medical Director: Maj Jonathan Letterman

General Headquarters:

Command of the Provost-Marshal-General: BG Marsena R. Patrick

- 93rd New York: Col John S. Crocker
- 8th United States, Companies A, B, C, D, F, and G: Cpt Edwin W. H. Read
- 6th Pennsylvania Cavalry, Companies E and I: Cpt James Starr
- Detachment Regular Cavalry: Lt Tattnall Paulding

Patrick's Brigade: Col William F. Rogers

- 21st New York: Ltc Chester W. Steinberg
- 23rd New York: Col Henry C. Hoffman
- 35th New York: Col John G. Todd
- 80th New York (20th Militia): Col Theodore B. Gates
- Maryland Light Artillery, Battery B: Cpt Alonzo Snow
- Ohio Light Artillery, 12th Battery: Cpt Aaron C. Johnson

Engineer Brigade: BG Henry W. Benham

- 15th New York Engineers: Col Clinton G. Colgate
- 50th New York Engineers: Col Charles B. Stuart
- United States Engineer Battalion: Cpt Chauncey B. Reese

Signal Corps: Cpt Samuel T. Cushing

Ordnance Detachment: Lt John R. Edie, Jr.

Guards and Orderlies:

- Oneida (New York) Cavalry: Cpt Daniel P. Mann

=== I Corps ===
MG John F. Reynolds

Chief of Artillery: Col Charles S. Wainwright

Escort:

- 1st Maine Cavalry, Company L: Cpt Constantine Taylor

Division	Brigade	Regiments and Others
First Division BG James S. Wadsworth	1st Brigade Col Walter Phelps, Jr.	22nd New York: Maj Thomas J. Strong; 24th New York: Col Samuel R. Beardsley; 30th New York: Col William M. Searing; 84th New York (14th Militia): Col Edward B. Fowler
First Division BG James S. Wadsworth	2nd Brigade BG Lysander Cutler	7th Indiana: Ltc Ira G. Grover; 76th New York: Col William P. Wainwright; 95th New York: Col George H. Biddle; 147th New York: Col John G. Butler; 56th Pennsylvania: Col William Hofmann
First Division BG James S. Wadsworth	3rd Brigade BG Gabriel R. Paul	22nd New Jersey: Col Abraham G. Demarest; 29th New Jersey: Col William R. Taylor; 30th New Jersey: Col John J. Cladek; 31st New Jersey: Ltc Robert R. Honeyman; 137th Pennsylvania: Col Joseph B. Kiddoo
First Division BG James S. Wadsworth	4th Brigade BG Solomon Meredith	19th Indiana: Col Samuel J. Williams; 24th Michigan: Col Henry A. Morrow; 2nd Wisconsin: Col Lucius Fairchild; 6th Wisconsin: Col Edward S. Bragg; 7th Wisconsin: Col William W. Robinson
First Division BG James S. Wadsworth	Artillery Cpt John A. Reynolds	New Hampshire Light, 1st Battery: Cpt Frederick M. Edgell; 1st New York Light, Battery L: Cpt John A. Reynolds; 4th United States, Battery B: Lt James Stewart
Second Division BG John C. Robinson	1st Brigade Col Adrian R. Root	16th Maine: Col Charles W. Tilden; 94th New York: Cpt Samuel A. Moffett; 104th New York: Col Gilbert G. Prey; 107th Pennsylvania: Col Thomas F. McCoy
Second Division BG John C. Robinson	2nd Brigade BG Henry Baxter	12th Massachusetts: Col James L. Bates; 26th New York: Ltc Gilbert S. Jennings; 90th Pennsylvania: Col Peter Lyle; 136th Pennsylvania: Col Thomas M. Bayne
Second Division BG John C. Robinson	3rd Brigade Col Samuel H. Leonard	13th Massachusetts: Ltc N. Walter Batchelder; 83rd New York (9th Militia): Ltc Joseph A. Moesch; 97th New York: Col Charles Wheelock; 11th Pennsylvania: Col Richard Coulter; 88th Pennsylvania: Ltc Louis Wagner
Second Division BG John C. Robinson	Artillery Cpt Dunbar R. Ransom	Maine Light, 2nd Battery (B): Cpt James A. Hall; Maine Light, 5th Battery (E): Cpt George F. Leppien (mw), Lt Edmund Kirby (Note: Assigned to the 5th Battery, Maine Light on May 3, 1863 by Major General Couch (see: Couch's and Morgan's report)) (mw), Lt Greenlief T. Stevens; Pennsylvania Light, Battery C: Cpt James Thompson; 5th United States, Battery C: Cpt Dunbar R. Ransom
Third Division MG Abner Doubleday	1st Brigade BG Thomas A. Rowley	121st Pennsylvania: Col Chapman Biddle; 135th Pennsylvania: Col James R. Porter; 142nd Pennsylvania: Col Robert P. Cummins; 151st Pennsylvania: Col Harrison Allen
Third Division MG Abner Doubleday	2nd Brigade Col Roy Stone	143rd Pennsylvania: Col Edmund L. Dana; 149th Pennsylvania: Ltc Walton Dwight; 150th Pennsylvania: Col Langhorne Wister
Third Division MG Abner Doubleday	Artillery Maj Ezra W. Matthews	1st Pennsylvania Light, Battery B: Cpt James H. Cooper; 1st Pennsylvania Light, Battery F: Lt R. Bruce Ricketts; 1st Pennsylvania Light, Battery G: Cpt Frank P. Amsden

=== II Corps ===
MG Darius N. Couch

Chief of Artillery and Assistant Inspector-General: Ltc Charles H. Morgan (Note: For Assistant Inspector-General see Couch's and Morgan's report.)

Escort:

- 6th New York Cavalry, Companies D and K: Cpt Riley Johnson

Division	Brigade	Regiments and Others
First Division (Note: During the principal operations south of the Rappahannock, Colonel Edward E. Cross had temporary command of a force consisting of the 5th New Hampshire, 88th New York, and 81st Pennsylvania. The Sixty-sixth New York, of the 3rd Brigade, served temporarily with the 1st Brigade.); MG Winfield S. Hancock	1st Brigade BG John C. Caldwell	5th New Hampshire: Col Edward E. Cross, Ltc Charles E. Hapgood; 61st New York: Col Nelson A. Miles (w), Ltc K. Oscar Broady; 81st Pennsylvania: Col H. Boyd McKeen (w); 148th Pennsylvania: Col James A. Beaver (w), Maj George A. Fairlamb
First Division MG Winfield S. Hancock	2nd Brigade BG Thomas F. Meagher	28th Massachusetts: Col Richard Byrnes; 63rd New York: Ltc Richard C. Bentley; 69th New York: Cpt James E. McGee; 88th New York: Col Patrick Kelly; 116th Pennsylvania (battalion): Maj St. Clair A. Mulholland
First Division MG Winfield S. Hancock	3rd Brigade BG Samuel K. Zook	52nd New York: Col Paul Frank (w), Ltc Charles G. Freudenberg; 57th New York: Ltc Alford B. Chapman; 66th New York: Col Orlando H. Morris; 140th Pennsylvania: Col Richard P. Roberts
First Division MG Winfield S. Hancock	4th Brigade Col John R. Brooke	27th Connecticut: Col Richard S. Bostwick (c); 2nd Delaware: Ltc David L. Stricker; 64th New York: Col Daniel G. Bingham; 53rd Pennsylvania: Ltc Richards McMichael; 145th Pennsylvania: Col Hiram L. Brown
First Division MG Winfield S. Hancock	Artillery Cpt Rufus D. Pettit	1st New York Light, Battery B: Cpt Rufus D. Pettit; 4th United States, Battery C: Lt Evan Thomas
Second Division BG John Gibbon	1st Brigade BG Alfred Sully (Note: Relieved May 1, 1863); Col Henry W. Hudson (Note: Relieved May 3, 1863); Col Byron Laflin	19th Maine: Col Francis E. Heath; 15th Massachusetts: Maj George C. Joslin; 1st Minnesota: Ltc William Colville, Jr.; 34th New York: Col Byron Laflin, Ltc John Beverly; 82nd New York (2nd Militia): Col Henry W. Hudson, Ltc James Huston
Second Division BG John Gibbon	2nd Brigade BG Joshua T. Owen	69th Pennsylvania: Col Dennis O'Kane; 71st Pennsylvania: Col Richard P. Smith; 72nd Pennsylvania: Col De Witt C. Baxter; 106th Pennsylvania: Col Turner G. Morehead
Second Division BG John Gibbon	3rd Brigade Col Norman J. Hall	19th Massachusetts: Ltc Arthur F. Devereux; 20th Massachusetts: Ltc George N. Macy; 7th Michigan: Cpt Amos E. Steele, Jr.; 42nd New York: Col James E. Mallon; 59th New York: Ltc Max A. Thoman; 127th Pennsylvania: Col William W. Jennings
Second Division BG John Gibbon	Sharpshooters	1st Company Massachusetts: Cpt William Plumer
Second Division BG John Gibbon	Artillery	1st Rhode Island Light, Battery A: Cpt William A. Arnold; 1st Rhode Island Light, Battery B: Cpt Thomas Frederick Brown
Third Division MG William H. French	1st Brigade Col Samuel S. Carroll	14th Indiana: Col John Coons; 24th New Jersey: Col William B. Robertson; 28th New Jersey: Ltc John A. Wildrick (c), Maj Samuel K. Wilson; 4th Ohio: Ltc Leonard W. Carpenter; 8th Ohio: Ltc Franklin Sawyer; 7th West Virginia: Col Joseph Snider, (Note: Turned over command to Lieutenant Colonel Lockwood on account of sickness on May 4, 1863.) Ltc Jonathan H. Lockwood
Third Division MG William H. French	2nd Brigade BG William Hays (w&c); Col Charles J. Powers	14th Connecticut: Maj Theodore G. Ellis; 12th New Jersey: Col J. Howard Willets (w), Maj John T. Hill; 108th New York: Col Charles J. Powers, Ltc Francis E. Pierce; 130th Pennsylvania: Col Levi Maish (w), Maj Joseph S. Jenkins
Third Division MG William H. French	3rd Brigade Col John D. MacGregor (Note: Turned over command to Colonel Albright on account of sickness on May 2, 1863.); Col Charles Albright	1st Delaware: Col Thomas A. Smyth; 4th New York: (Note: Not engaged, assigned to special duty as guard to the corps hospital.) Ltc William Jameson; 132nd Pennsylvania: Col Charles Albright, Ltc Joseph E. Shreve
Third Division MG William H. French	Artillery	1st New York Light, Battery G: Lt Nelson Ames; 1st Rhode Island Light, Battery G: Cpt George W. Adams
Third Division MG William H. French	Provost Guard	10th New York (4 companies): Maj George F. Hopper
	Reserve Artillery	1st United States, Battery I: Lt Edmund Kirby, (Note: Assigned to the 5th Battery, Maine Light on May 3, 1863 by Major General Couch); Lt George A. Woodruff (Note: Mentioned in Morgan's report, but omitted in the order of battle by Sears and the Official Records.): 4th United States, Battery A: Lt Alonzo H. Cushing

=== III Corps ===
MG Daniel Sickles

Chief of Artillery: Cpt George E. Randolph

Division	Brigade	Regiments and Others
First Division BG David B. Birney	1st Brigade BG Charles K. Graham (Note: Assigned to command of Third Division May 4, 1863); Col Thomas W. Egan	57th Pennsylvania: Col Peter Sides; 63rd Pennsylvania: Ltc William S. Kirkwood (mw), Cpt James F. Ryan; 68th Pennsylvania: Col Andrew H. Tippin; 105th Pennsylvania: Col Amor A. McKnight (k), Ltc Calvin A. Craig; 114th Pennsylvania: Col Charles H. T. Collis, (Note: Left regiment on May 3, 1863 on account of exhaustion (see: Birney's and Collis' report)) Ltc Frederick F. Cavada; 141st Pennsylvania: Col Henry J. Madill
First Division BG David B. Birney	2nd Brigade BG J. H. Hobart Ward	20th Indiana: Col John Wheeler; 3rd Maine: Col Moses B. Lakeman; 4th Maine: Col Elijah Walker; 38th New York: Col P. Regis De Trobriand; 40th New York: Col Thomas W. Egan; 99th Pennsylvania: Col Asher S. Leidy
First Division BG David B. Birney	3rd Brigade Col Samuel B. Hayman	17th Maine: Ltc Charles B. Merrill, Col Thomas A. Roberts (Note: assumed command on May 5, 1863 (see: Merrill's report)); 3rd Michigan: Col Byron R. Pierce (w), Ltc Edwin S. Pierce; 5th Michigan: Ltc Edward T. Sherlock (k), Maj John Pulford; 1st New York: Ltc Francis L. Leland; 37th New York: Ltc Gilbert Riordan
First Division BG David B. Birney	Artillery Cpt A. Judson Clark	New Jersey Light, Battery B: Lt Robert Sims; 1st Rhode Island Light, Battery E: Lt Pardon S. Jastram; 3rd United States, Batteries F and K: Lt John G. Turnbull
Second Division MG Hiram Berry (k); BG Joseph B. Carr	1st Brigade BG Joseph B. Carr; Col William E. Blaisdell	1st Massachusetts: Col Napoleon B. McLaughlen; 11th Massachusetts: Col William E. Blaisdell, Ltc Porter D. Tripp; 16th Massachusetts: Ltc Waldo Merriam; 11th New Jersey: Col Robert McAllister; 26th Pennsylvania: Col Benjamin C. Tilghman (w), Maj Robert L. Bodine
Second Division MG Hiram Berry (k); BG Joseph B. Carr	2nd Brigade BG Joseph W. Revere (Note: Relieved of command May 3, 1863 (see: Sickles', Revere's and Farnum's report)); Col J. Egbert Farnum	70th New York: Col J. Egbert Farnum, Ltc Thomas Holt; 71st New York: Col Henry L. Potter; 72nd New York: Col William O Stevens (k), Maj John Leonard; 73rd New York: Maj Michael W. Burns; 74th New York: Ltc Wm. H. Lounsbury (w), Cpt Henry M. Alles (w), Cpt Francis E. Tyler; 120th New York: Ltc Cornelius D. Westbrook
Second Division MG Hiram Berry (k); BG Joseph B. Carr	3rd Brigade BG Gershom Mott (w); Col William J. Sewell	5th New Jersey: Col William J. Sewell, Maj Ashbel W. Angel (w), Cpt Virgil M. Healy; 6th New Jersey: Col George C. Burling (w), Ltc Stephen R. Gilkyson; 7th New Jersey: Col Louis R. Francine, (Note: Turned over command to Lieutenant Colonel Price on account of sickness on May 3, 1863 (see: Francine's and Price's report)) Ltc Francis Price; 8th New Jersey: Col John Ramsey (w), Cpt John Langton; 2nd New York: Col Sidney W. Park (w), Ltc William A. Olmsted; 115th Pennsylvania: Col Francis A. Lancaster (k), Maj John P. Dunne
Second Division MG Hiram Berry (k); BG Joseph B. Carr	Artillery Cpt Thomas W. Osborn	1st New York Light, Battery D: Lt George B. Winslow; New York Light, 4th Battery: (Note: Sears and the Official Records lists Lieutenant George F. Barstow in command, but he is not mentioned in the reports. Barstow appears in Cushing's report with the rank of Major and as Assistant Adjutant General (see: Cushing's and Osborn's report)) Lt William T. McLean; 1st United States, Battery H: Lt Justin E. Dimick (mw), Lt James A. Sanderson; 4th United States, Battery K: Lt Francis W. Seeley
Third Division BG Amiel W. Whipple (mw); BG Charles K. Graham (Note: Assigned to command of Third Division May 4, 1863)	1st Brigade Col Emlen Franklin	86th New York: Ltc Bena J. Chapin (k), Cpt Jacob H. Lansing; 124th New York: Col A. Van Horne Ellis; 122nd Pennsylvania: Ltc Edward McGovern
Third Division BG Amiel W. Whipple (mw); BG Charles K. Graham	2nd Brigade Col Samuel M. Bowman	12th New Hampshire: Col Joseph H. Potter (w), Ltc John F. Marsh (w), Maj George D. Savage (w); 84th Pennsylvania: Ltc Milton Opp; 110th Pennsylvania: Col James Crowther (k), Maj David M. Jones (w&c)
Third Division BG Amiel W. Whipple (mw); BG Charles K. Graham	3rd Brigade Col Hiram Berdan	1st United States Sharpshooters: Ltc Casper Trepp; 2nd United States Sharpshooters: Maj Homer R. Stoughton
Third Division BG Amiel W. Whipple (mw); BG Charles K. Graham	Artillery (Note: Captain Albert A. Von Puttkammer was absent (see: Huntington's report)) Cpt James F. Huntington	New York Light, 10th Battery: Lt Samuel Lewis; New York Light, 11th Battery: Lt John E. Burton; 1st Ohio Light, Battery H: Cpt James F. Huntington

=== V Corps ===
MG George Meade

Chief of Artillery: Cpt Stephen H. Weed

Escort:

- 17th Pennsylvania Cavalry (2 companies): Cpt William Thompson

Division	Brigade	Regiments and Others
First Division BG Charles Griffin	1st Brigade BG James Barnes	2nd Maine: Col George Varney; 18th Massachusetts: Col Joseph Hayes; 22nd Massachusetts: Col William S. Tilton; 2nd Company Massachusetts Sharpshooters: (Note: Attached to the 22nd Massachusetts) Lt Robert Smith; 1st Michigan: Col Ira C. Abbott; 13th New York (2 companies): Cpt William Downey; 25th New York: Col Charles A. Johnson; 118th Pennsylvania: Col Charles M. Prevost
First Division BG Charles Griffin	2nd Brigade Col James McQuade (Note: Injured on May 4, 1863 and turned over the command to Colonel Sweitzer (see: McQuade's report)); Col Jacob B. Sweitzer	9th Massachusetts: Col Patrick R. Guiney; 32nd Massachusetts: Ltc Luther Stephenson; 4th Michigan: Col Harrison H. Jeffords; 14th New York: Ltc Thomas M. Davies; 62nd Pennsylvania: Col Jacob B. Sweitzer, Ltc James C. Hull
First Division BG Charles Griffin	3rd Brigade Col T.B.W. Stockton	20th Maine: Ltc Joshua Chamberlain; 16th Michigan: Ltc Norval E. Welch; Brady's Company Michigan Sharpshooters (Note: Attached to the 16th Michigan); 12th New York: Cpt William Huson; 17th New York: Ltc Nelson B. Bartram; 44th New York: Col James C. Rice; 83rd Pennsylvania: Col Strong Vincent
First Division BG Charles Griffin	Artillery Cpt Augustus P. Martin	Massachusetts Light, 3rd Battery (C): Cpt Augustus P. Martin; Massachusetts Light, 5th Battery (E): Cpt Charles A. Phillips; 1st Rhode Island Light, Battery C: Cpt Richard Waterman; 5th United States, Battery D: Lt Charles E. Hazlett
Second Division MG George Sykes	1st Brigade BG Romeyn B. Ayres	3rd United States, Companies B, C, F, G, I, and K: Cpt John D. Wilkins; 4th United States, Companies C, F, H, and K: Cpt Hiram Dryer; 12th United States, Companies A, B. C, D, and G, 1st Battalion, and A, C, and D, 2nd Battalion: Maj Richard S. Smith; 14th United States, Companies A, B, D, E, F, and G, 1st Battalion, and F and G, 2nd Battalion: Cpt Jonathan B. Hager, Maj Grotius R. Giddings (Note: Assumed command May 3, 1863 (see: Hager's report))
Second Division MG George Sykes	2nd Brigade Col Sidney Burbank	2nd United States, Companies B, C, F, I, and K: Cpt Salem S. Marsh (k), Cpt Samuel A. McKee; 6th United States, Companies D, F, G, H, and I: Cpt Levi C. Bootes; 7th United States, Companies A, B, E, and I: Cpt David P. Hancock; 10th United States, Companies D, G, and H: Lt Edward G. Bush; 11th United States, Companies B, C, D, E, F, and G, 1st Battalion, and C and D, 2nd Battalion: Maj DeLancey Floyd-Jones; 17th United States, Companies A, C, D, G, and H, 1st Battalion, and A and B, 2nd Battalion): Maj George L. Andrews
Second Division MG George Sykes	3rd Brigade Col Patrick O'Rorke	5th New York: Col Cleveland Winslow; 140th New York: Ltc Louis Ernst; 146th New York: Col Kenner Garrard
Second Division MG George Sykes	Artillery Cpt Stephen H. Weed	1st Ohio Light, Battery L: Cpt Frank C. Gibbs; 5th United States, Battery I: Lt Malbone F. Watson
Third Division BG Andrew A. Humphreys	1st Brigade BG Erastus B. Tyler	91st Pennsylvania: Col Edgar M. Gregory (w), Ltc Joseph H. Sinex; 126th Pennsylvania: Ltc David W. Rowe (Note: Slightly wounded, but remained in command (see: Tyler's report)) (w); 129th Pennsylvania: Col Jacob G. Frick; 134th Pennsylvania: Col Edward O'Brien
Third Division BG Andrew A. Humphreys	2nd Brigade Col Peter H. Allabach	123rd Pennsylvania: Col John B. Clark; 131st Pennsylvania: Maj Robert W. Patton; 133rd Pennsylvania: Col Franklin B. Speakman; 155th Pennsylvania: Ltc John H. Cain
Third Division BG Andrew A. Humphreys	Artillery Cpt Alanson M. Randol	1st New York Light, Battery C: Cpt Almont Barnes; 1st United States, Batteries E and G: Cpt Alanson M. Randol

=== VI Corps ===
MG John Sedgwick

Chief of Artillery: Col Charles H. Tompkins

Escort: Maj Hugh H. Janeway

- 1st New Jersey Cavalry, Company L: Lt Voorhees Dye
- 1st Pennsylvania Cavalry, Company H: Cpt William S. Craft

Division	Brigade	Regiments and Others
First Division BG William T. H. Brooks	1st Brigade Col Henry W. Brown (w); Col William H. Penrose; Col Samuel L. Buck (Note: Assumed command May 3, 1863. After Colonel Buck was accidentally injured on May 4, 1863 the command devolved again on Colonel Penrose (see: Penrose's report)) (w); Col William H. Penrose	1st New Jersey: Col Mark W. Collet (k), Ltc William Henry, Jr.; 2nd New Jersey: Col Samuel L. Buck, Ltc Charles Wiebecke; 3rd New Jersey: Maj James W. H. Stickney; 15th New Jersey: Col William H. Penrose, Ltc Edward L. Campbell; 23rd New Jersey: Col E. Burd Grubb
First Division BG William T. H. Brooks	2nd Brigade BG Joseph J. Bartlett	5th Maine: Col Clark S. Edwards; 16th New York: Col Joel J. Seaver; 27th New York: Col Alexander D. Adams; 121st New York: Col Emory Upton; 96th Pennsylvania: Maj William H. Lessig
First Division BG William T. H. Brooks	3rd Brigade BG David A. Russell	18th New York: Col George R. Myers; 32nd New York: Col Francis E. Pinto; 49th Pennsylvania: Ltc Thomas M. Hulings; 95th Pennsylvania: Col Gustavus W. Town (k), Ltc Elisha Hall (k), Cpt Theodore H. McCalla; 119th Pennsylvania: Col Peter C. Ellmaker
First Division BG William T. H. Brooks	Artillery Maj John A. Tompkins	Massachusetts Light, 1st Battery (A): Cpt William H. McCartney; New Jersey Light, Battery A: Lt Augustine N. Parsons; Maryland Light, Battery A: Cpt James H. Rigby; 2nd United States, Battery D: Lt Edward B. Williston
First Division BG William T. H. Brooks	Provost Guard	4th New Jersey (Companies A, C, and H): Cpt Charles Ewing
Second Division BG Albion P. Howe	2nd Brigade Col Lewis A. Grant	26th New Jersey: Col Andrew J. Morrison, (Note: Arrested for intoxication) Ltc Edward Martindale; 2nd Vermont: Col James H. Walbridge; 3rd Vermont: Col Thomas O. Seaver, Ltc Samuel E. Pingree (Note: Commanded the regiment while Colonel Seaver acted as General officer of the day during the retreat over the Rappahannock (see: Grant's and Seaver's report)); 4th Vermont: Col Charles B. Stoughton; 5th Vermont: Ltc John R. Lewis; 6th Vermont: Col Elisha L. Barney
Second Division BG Albion P. Howe	3rd Brigade BG Thomas H. Neill	7th Maine: Ltc Seldon Connor; 21st New Jersey: Col Gilliam Van Houten (mw), Ltc Isaac S. Mettler; 20th New York: Col Ernst Von Vegesack (w); 33rd New York: Col Robert F. Taylor; 49th New York: Col Daniel D. Bidwell; 77th New York: Ltc Winsor B. French
Second Division BG Albion P. Howe	Artillery Maj J. Watts de Peyster, Jr.	New York Light, 1st Battery: Cpt Andrew Cowan; 5th United States, Battery F: Lt Leonard Martin
Third Division MG John Newton	1st Brigade Col Alexander Shaler	65th New York: Ltc Joseph E. Hamblin; 67th New York: Col Nelson Cross; 122nd New York: Col Silas Titus; 23rd Pennsylvania: Col John Ely; 82nd Pennsylvania: Maj Isaac C. Bassett
Third Division MG John Newton	2nd Brigade Col William H. Browne (w); Col Henry L. Eustis	7th Massachusetts: Col Thomas D. Johns (w), Ltc Franklin P. Harlow; 10th Massachusetts: Col Henry L. Eustis, Ltc Joseph B. Parsons; 37th Massachusetts: Col Oliver Edwards; 36th New York: Ltc James J. Walsh; 2nd Rhode Island: Col Horatio Rogers, Jr.
Third Division MG John Newton	3rd Brigade BG Frank Wheaton	62nd New York: Ltc Theodore B. Hamilton (w); 93rd Pennsylvania: Cpt John S. Long; 98th Pennsylvania: Col John F. Ballier (w), Ltc George Wynkoop; 102nd Pennsylvania: Col Joseph M. Kinkead; 139th Pennsylvania: Col Frederick H. Collier
Third Division MG John Newton	Artillery Cpt Jeremiah McCarthy	1st New York Light, Batteries C and D: Cpt Jeremiah McCarthy; 2nd United States, Battery G: Lt John H. Butler
Light Division; BG Calvin E. Pratt; Col Hiram Burnham (Note: Assumed command April 30, 1863 after the resignation of Brigadier General Pratt; according to Eicher and Eicher the date of resignation was April 25, 1863))	Infantry	6th Maine: Ltc Benjamin F. Harris; 31st New York: Col Frank Jones; 43rd New York: Col Benjamin F. Baker; 61st Pennsylvania: Col George C. Spear (k), Maj George W. Dawson; 5th Wisconsin: Col Thomas S. Allen
Light Division; BG Calvin E. Pratt; Col Hiram Burnham	Artillery	New York Light Artillery, 3rd Battery: Lt William A. Harn

=== XI Corps ===
MG Oliver O. Howard

Chief of Artillery: Ltc Louis Schirmer

Escort:

- 1st Indiana Cavalry, Companies I and K: Cpt Abram Sharra

Division	Brigade	Regiments and Others
First Division BG Charles Devens, Jr. (w); BG Nathaniel C. McLean	1st Brigade Col Leopold von Gilsa	41st New York: Maj Detlev Von Einsiedel; 45th New York: Col George von Amsberg; 54th New York: Ltc Charles Ashby (c), Maj Stephen Kovacs; 153rd Pennsylvania: Col Charles Glanz (c), Ltc Jacob Dachrodt
First Division BG Charles Devens, Jr. (w); BG Nathaniel C. McLean	2nd Brigade BG Nathaniel C. McLean; Col John C. Lee	17th Connecticut: Col William H. Noble (w), Maj Allen G. Brady; 25th Ohio: Col William P. Richardson (w), Maj Jeremiah Williams; 55th Ohio: Col John C. Lee, Ltc Charles B. Gambee; 75th Ohio: Col Robert Reily (k), Cpt Benjamin Morgan; 107th Ohio: Col Seraphim Meyer (w&c), Ltc Charles Mueller
First Division BG Charles Devens, Jr. (w); BG Nathaniel C. McLean	Artillery	New York Light, 13th Battery: Cpt Julius Dieckmann
First Division BG Charles Devens, Jr. (w); BG Nathaniel C. McLean	Provost Guard	8th New York (1 company): Lt Herman Rosenkranz
Second Division BG Adolph Von Steinwehr	1st Brigade Col Adolphus Buschbeck	29th New York: Ltc Louis Hartmann (w), Maj Alexander Von Schluembach; 154th New York: Col Patrick H. Jones (w), Ltc Henry C. Loomis; 27th Pennsylvania: Ltc Lorenz Cantador; 73rd Pennsylvania: Ltc William Moore (w)
Second Division BG Adolph Von Steinwehr	2nd Brigade BG Francis C. Barlow	33rd Massachusetts: Col Adin B. Underwood; 134th New York: Col Charles Coster; 136th New York: Col James Wood; 73rd Ohio: Col Orland Smith
Second Division BG Adolph Von Steinwehr	Artillery	1st New York Light, Battery I: Cpt Michael Wiedrich
Third Division MG Carl Schurz	1st Brigade BG Alexander Schimmelfennig	82nd Illinois: Col Frederick Hecker (w), Maj Ferdinand H. Rolshausen (w), Cpt Jacob Lasalle; 68th New York: Col Gotthilf Bourry; 157th New York: Col Philip P. Brown, Jr.; 61st Ohio: Col Stephen J. McGroarty; 74th Pennsylvania: Ltc Adolph Von Hartung
Third Division MG Carl Schurz	2nd Brigade Col Wlodzimierz Krzyzanowski	58th New York: Cpt Frederick Braun (mw), Cpt Emil Koenig; 119th New York: Col Elias Peissner (k), Ltc John T. Lockman; 75th Pennsylvania: Col Francis Mahler; 26th Wisconsin: Col William H. Jacobs (w)
Third Division MG Carl Schurz	Unattached	82nd Ohio: Col James S. Robinson
Third Division MG Carl Schurz	Artillery	1st Ohio Light, Battery I: Cpt Hubert Dilger
	Reserve Artillery Ltc Louis Schirmer	New York Light, 2nd Battery: Cpt Hermann Jahn; 1st Ohio Light, Battery K: Cpt William L. DeBeck; 1st West Virginia Light, Battery C: Cpt Wallace Hill

=== XII Corps ===
MG Henry W. Slocum

Chief of Artillery: Cpt Clermont L. Best

Provost Guard:

- 10th Maine Battalion (3 companies): Cpt John D. Beardsley

Division	Brigade	Regiments and Others
First Division BG Alpheus S. Williams	1st Brigade BG Joseph F. Knipe (Note: Assumed also command of the Second Brigade on May 3, 1863 after Colonel Ross was wounded (see: Williams' and Knipe's report))	5th Connecticut: Col Warren W. Packer (c), Ltc James A. Betts, (Note: Turned over command to Major Lane on account of sickness on May 2, 1863 (see: Lane's report)) Maj David F. Lane; 28th New York: Ltc Elliott W. Cook (c), Maj Theophilus Fitzgerald; 46th Pennsylvania: Maj Cyrus Strous (mw), Cpt Edward L. Witman; 128th Pennsylvania: Col Joseph A. Mathews (c), Maj Cephas W. Dyer
First Division BG Alpheus S. Williams	2nd Brigade Col Samuel Ross (w); BG Joseph F. Knipe (Note: Assumed also command of the Second Brigade on May 3, 1863 after Colonel Ross was wounded (see: Williams' and Knipe's report))	20th Connecticut: Ltc William B. Wooster (c), Maj Philo B. Buckingham; 3rd Maryland: Ltc Gilbert P. Robinson; 123rd New York: Col Archibald L. McDougall; 145th New York: Col E. Livingston Price (w), Cpt George W. Reid
First Division BG Alpheus S. Williams	3rd Brigade BG Thomas H. Ruger	27th Indiana: Col Silas Colgrove; 2nd Massachusetts: Col Samuel M. Quincy; 13th New Jersey: Col Ezra A. Carman, (Note: Injured on May 1, 1863 (see: Beardsley's report)) Maj John Grimes (w), Cpt George A. Beardsley; 107th New York: Col Alexander S. Diven; 3rd Wisconsin: Col William Hawley
First Division BG Alpheus S. Williams	Artillery Cpt Robert H. Fitzhugh	1st New York Light, Battery K: Lt Edward L. Bailey; 1st New York Light, Battery M: Lt Charles E. Winegar (c), Lt John D Woodbury; 4th United States, Battery F: Lt Franklin B. Crosby (k), Lt Edward D. Muhlenberg
Second Division BG John W. Geary	1st Brigade Col Charles Candy	5th Ohio: Ltc Robert L. Kilpatrick (w), Maj Henry E. Symmes; 7th Ohio: Col William R. Creighton; 29th Ohio: Ltc Thomas Clark; 66th Ohio: Ltc Eugene Powell; 28th Pennsylvania: Maj Lansford F. Chapman (k), Cpt Conrad U. Meyer; 147th Pennsylvania: Ltc Ario Pardee, Jr.
Second Division BG John W. Geary	2nd Brigade BG Thomas L. Kane	29th Pennsylvania: Ltc William Rickards, Jr.; 109th Pennsylvania: Col Henry J. Stainrook (k), Cpt John Young, Jr.; 111th Pennsylvania: Col George A. Cobham, Jr.; 124th Pennsylvania: Ltc Simon Litzenberg; 125th Pennsylvania: Col Jacob Higgins
Second Division BG John W. Geary	3rd Brigade BG George S. Greene	60th New York: Ltc John C. O. Redington; 78th New York: Maj Henry R. Stagg, Cpt William H. Randall (Note: Assigned to command on May 1, 1863 (see: Randall's report)); 102nd New York: Col James C. Lane; 137th New York: Col David Ireland; 149th New York: Maj Abel G. Cook (w), Cpt Oliver T. May, Ltc Koert S. Van Voorhis (Note: Lieutenant Colonel 137th New York; assigned after Major Cook was wounded (see also: Voorhis' report))
Second Division BG John W. Geary	Artillery Cpt Joseph M. Knap	Pennsylvania Light, Battery E: Lt Charles A. Atwell (w), Lt James D. McGill; Pennsylvania Light, Battery F: Cpt Robert B. Hampton (mw), Lt James P. Fleming

=== Cavalry Corps ===
BG George Stoneman (Note: The Second and Third Divisions, First Brigade, First Division and the Reserve Brigade, with Battery A, 2nd United States and Batteries B and L, 2nd United States on the Stoneman Raid, April 29-May 7, 1863. Hooker had hoped that the raid would "enable Stoneman to do a land-office business in the interior.")

Division	Brigade	Regiments and Others
First Division; BG Alfred Pleasonton (Note: Assumed command of First and Second Divisions, May 4, 1863.)	1st Brigade Col Benjamin F. Davis	8th Illinois: Ltc David R. Clendenin; 3rd Indiana: Col George H. Chapman; 8th New York: Ltc William L. Markell; 9th New York: Col William A. Sackett
First Division; BG Alfred Pleasonton	2nd Brigade Col Thomas Devin	1st Michigan (Company L): Lt John K. Truax; 6th New York: Ltc Duncan McVicar (k), Cpt William E. Beardsley; 8th Pennsylvania: Maj Pennock Huey; 17th Pennsylvania: Col Josiah H. Kellogg
First Division; BG Alfred Pleasonton	Artillery	New York Light, 6th Battery: Lt Joseph W. Martin
Second Division; BG William W. Averell (Note: Relieved of command May 4, 1863.)	1st Brigade Col Horace B. Sargent	1st Massachusetts: Ltc Greely S. Curtis; 4th New York: Col Louis P. Di Cesnola; 6th Ohio: Maj Benjamin C. Stanhope; 1st Rhode Island: Ltc John L. Thompson
Second Division; BG William W. Averell	2nd Brigade Col John B. McIntosh	3rd Pennsylvania: Ltc Edward S. Jones; 4th Pennsylvania: Ltc William E. Doster; 16th Pennsylvania: Ltc Lorenzo D. Rogers
Second Division; BG William W. Averell	Artillery	2nd United States, Battery A: Cpt John C. Tidball
Third Division (Note: Relieved of command May 4, 1863.); BG David McM. Gregg	1st Brigade Col H. Judson Kilpatrick	1st Maine: Col Calvin S. Douty; 2nd New York: Ltc Henry E. Davies, Jr.; 10th New York: Ltc William Irvine
Third Division; BG David McM. Gregg	2nd Brigade Col Percy Wyndham	12th Illinois: Ltc Hasbrouck Davis; 1st Maryland: Ltc James M. Deems; 1st New Jersey: Ltc Virgil Brodrick; 1st Pennsylvania: Col John P. Taylor
Reporting directly	Reserve Brigade BG John Buford	6th Pennsylvania: Maj Robert Morris, Jr.; 1st United States: Cpt Richard S. C. Lord; 2nd United States: Maj Charles J. Whiting; 5th United States: Cpt James E. Harrison; 6th United States: Cpt George C. Cram
	Horse Artillery Cpt James M. Robertson	2nd United States, Batteries B and L: Lt Albert O. Vincent; 2nd United States, Battery M: Lt Robert Clarke; 4th United States, Battery E: Lt Samuel S. Elder

=== Artillery ===
BG Henry J. Hunt (Note: Chief of Artillery to the whole Army.)

Brigade	Regiments and Batteries
Artillery Reserve Cpt William M. Graham; BG Robert O. Tyler (Note: Assigned May 2, 1863.)	1st Connecticut Heavy, Battery B: Lt Albert F. Brooker; 1st Connecticut Heavy, Battery M: Cpt Franklin A. Pratt; New York Light, 5th Battery: Cpt Elijah D. Taft; New York Light, 15th Battery: Cpt Patrick Hart; New York Light, 29th Battery: Lt Gustav Von Blucher; New York Light, 30th Battery: Cpt Adolph Voegelee; New York Light, 32nd Battery: Lt George Gaston; 1st United States, Battery K: Lt Lorenzo Thomas, Jr.; 3rd United States, Battery C: Lt Henry Meinell; 4th United States, Battery G: Lt Marcus P. Miller; 5th United States, Battery K: Lt David H. Kinzie; 32nd Massachusetts Infantry (Company C): Cpt Josiah C. Fuller
Train Guard	4th New Jersey (7 Companies): Col William Birney, Cpt Robert S. Johnston
