= Battery C, 1st New Jersey Light Artillery =

- Active: September 11, 1863 to June 19, 1865
- Country: United States
- Allegiance: Union
- Branch: Artillery
- Engagements: Siege of Petersburg; First Battle of Deep Bottom; Battle of Fort Stedman; Appomattox Campaign

Battery C, 1st New Jersey Light Artillery was an artillery battery that served in the Union Army during the American Civil War.

== Service ==
The battery was organized in Trenton, New Jersey and mustered in for a three-year enlistment on September 11, 1863 under the command of Captain Christian Woerner.

The battery was attached to Barry's Artillery Command, XXII Corps, Defenses of Washington, to May 1864. Abercrombie's Command, Army of the Potomac, to June 1864. Artillery Brigade, II Corps, to September 1864. Artillery Reserve, Army of the Potomac, to June 1865.

Battery C, 1st New Jersey Light Artillery mustered out of service June 19, 1865.

== Detailed service ==
Left New Jersey for Washington, D.C., September 25, 1863. Duty in the defenses of Washington, D. C., until May 1864. Moved to Belle Plain, Va., May 11–12. Guarded rebel prisoners until May 24. Moved to Port Royal, then to White House Landing, York River, May 24-June 4. Repulse of attack at White House June 20. Charles City Court House June 22. Joined II Corps at Petersburg June 29. Siege of Petersburg June 29, 1864 to April 2, 1865. Demonstration north of the James July 27–29, 1864. Deep Bottom July 27–28. Demonstration north of the James River August 13–20. Strawberry Plains August 14–18. Ream's Station August 25. In the lines before Petersburg at Fort Hell until October 1. At Battery 16 and Fort Alexander Hays until November 22. At Fort Haskell until January 31, 1865, and at Forts Sedgwick and Haskell until April 2. Actions at Fort Sedgwick September 30, 1864. Battery 16 October 3–12. Fort Haskell November 27 and March 29, 1865. Fort Sedgwick April 1–2. Fort Stedman March 25, 1865. Appomattox Campaign March 28-April 9. Fall of Petersburg April 2. Pursuit of Lee April 5–9. At Ford's Station April 7–14, and at Wilson's Station until April 20. Moved to Washington, D. C., April 20-May 2. Grand Review of the Armies May 23.

== Casualties ==
The battery lost a total of 12 men during service; 8 enlisted men killed or mortally wounded, 4 enlisted men died of disease.

== Commanders ==
- Captain Christian Woerner

== See also ==
- List of New Jersey Civil War units
- New Jersey in the Civil War
