= 35th New Jersey Infantry Regiment =

- Active: August 28, 1863 - July 20, 1865
- Country: United States
- Allegiance: Union
- Branch: Infantry
- Engagements: Meridian Campaign; Atlanta campaign Battle of Resaca; Battle of Dallas; Battle of New Hope Church; Battle of Allatoona; Battle of Kennesaw Mountain; Battle of Decatur; Battle of Atlanta; Siege of Atlanta; Battle of Jonesborough; Battle of Lovejoy's Station; Sherman's March to the Sea; Carolinas campaign Battle of Bentonville

The 35th New Jersey Infantry Regiment was an infantry regiment in the Union Army during the American Civil War.

== Service ==
The 35th New Jersey Infantry Regiment was organized at Flemington, New Jersey for three years service with Company A being the first to muster into the service on August 28, 1863, and the last (Company D) on October 13, 1863, under the command of Colonel John J. Cladek.

The regiment was attached to Provisional Brigade, Casey's Division, XXII Corps, to November 1863. District of Columbus, Kentucky, 6th Division, XVI Corps, Department of the Tennessee, to January 1864. 1st Brigade, 4th Division, XVI Corps, to March 1864. 2nd Brigade, 4th Division, XVI Corps, to September 1864. 2nd Brigade, 1st Division, XVII Corps, to July 1865.

The 35th New Jersey Infantry mustered out of service July 20, 1865, at Louisville, Kentucky.

== Detailed service ==
Left New Jersey for Washington, D.C., October 19, 1863. Duty in the defenses of Washington, D.C., until November 1863. Moved to Eastport, Miss., November 9–28, then to Columbus, Ky., and Union City, Tenn., December 12–20, and duty there until January 16, 1864. Moved to Columbus, Ky., then to Vicksburg, Miss. Meridian Campaign February 3-March 2. Meridian February 9–13. Marion February 15–17. Meridian February 16. Operations in western Tennessee against Forrest March 16-April 14. Atlanta Campaign May 1-September 8. Demonstrations on Resaca May 5–13. Sugar Valley, near Resaca, May 9. Near Resaca May 13. Battle of Resaca May 14–15. Advanced on Dallas May 22–25. Operations on line of Pumpkin Vine Creek and battles about Dallas, New Hope Church, and Allatoona Hills May 25-June 5. Operations about Marietta and against Kennesaw Mountain June 10-July 2. Assault on Kennesaw June 27. On line of Nickajack Creek July 2–5. Ruff's Mills July 3–4. Chattahoochie River July 5–17. Decatur July 19–22. Battle of Atlanta July 22. Siege of Atlanta July 22-August 25. Flank movement on Jonesboro August 25–30. Battle of Jonesborough August 31-September 1. Lovejoy's Station September 2–6. At Eastpoint until October 4. Pursuit of Hood into Alabama October 4–26. March to the sea November 15-December 10. Siege of Savannah December 10–21. Carolinas Campaign January to April 1865. Reconnaissance to Salkehatchie River January 20, 1865. River's and Broxton Bridges, Salkehatchie River, S.C., February 2. River's Bridge February 3. South Edisto River February 9. North Edisto River, Orangeburg, February 11–12. Columbia February 15–17. Cheraw March 3–4. Battle of Bentonville, N.C., March 20–21. Occupation of Goldsboro March 24. Advanced on Raleigh April 10–14. Occupation of Raleigh April 14. Bennett's House April 26. Surrender of Johnston and his army. Marched to Washington, D.C., via Richmond, Va., April 29-May 19. Grand Review of the Armies May 23. Moved to Louisville, Ky., June 5, and duty there until July.

== Casualties ==
The regiment lost a total of 159 men during service; 1 officer and 24 enlisted men killed or mortally wounded, 2 officers and 132 enlisted men died of disease.

== Commanders ==
- Colonel John J. Cladek

== See also ==
- List of New Jersey Civil War units
- New Jersey in the American Civil War
