= 38th New Jersey Volunteer Infantry Regiment =

- State Flag of New Jersey
- Active: September 1864 – June 30, 1865
- Country: United States
- Branch: Union Army
- Type: Infantry
- Role: Garrison duty
- Size: 1,048 (Total Strength)
- Part of: Army of the James
- Garrison/HQ: Fort Powhatan
- Equipment: Pattern 1853 Enfield Rifles (.577 caliber) (1864)
- Engagements: None

Commanders
- Notable commanders: Colonel. William J. Sewell

The 38th New Jersey Volunteer Infantry Regiment was an infantry regiment that served in the Union Army during the American Civil War. Organized in late 1864, the regiment was among scores of regiments raised in the summer of 1864 as Hundred Days Men, an effort to augment existing manpower for an all-out push to end the war within 100 days.

== Service ==
The regiment was organized at Trenton, New Jersey, under the leadership of Colonel William J. Sewell, Lieutenant Colonel Ashbel W. Angel, and Major William H. Tantum.

The unit was mustered into service by individual companies throughout September and early October 1864:

Companies and their respective dates of muster
Company	Date of Muster
A	September 22
B	September 9
C	September 10
D	September 24
E	October 1
F	September 22
H	September 15
I	September 12
K	September 15

Upon organization, the regiment was dispatched to City Point, Virginia, in three distinct detachments between September 20 and October 4, 1864.

The 38th New Jersey was attached to the Separate Brigade, Army of the James, in the Department of Virginia and North Carolina. For the Majority of its service, the regiment conducted garrison duty at Fort Powhatan (6 Companies, under Colonel Sewell and Lt. Colonel Angel) and Fort Pocahontas (4 Companies under Major Tantum)

The regiment remained at Fort Powhatan and Fort Pocahontas until April 1865, following the fall of Richmond and the surrender of the Army of Northern Virginia.

In April 1865, the regiment moved back to City Point. The Regiment was mustered out of service on June 30, 1865.

== Notable commanders ==
- Colonel William J. Sewell
- Lieutenant Colonel Ashbel W. Angel
- Major William H. Tantum

== Total Strength and Casualties ==
The 38th New Jersey had a total strength of the regiment was 1,048, and lost 14 enlisted men to disease.

== See also ==
- List of New Jersey units in the American Civil War
- New Jersey in the American Civil War
