= Battle of Fredericksburg order of battle =

The order of battle for the Battle of Fredericksburg includes:

- Battle of Fredericksburg order of battle: Confederate
- Battle of Fredericksburg order of battle: Union
