= 31st New Jersey Infantry Regiment =

- Active: September 17, 1862 - June 24, 1863.
- Country: United States
- Allegiance: Union
- Branch: Union Army
- Type: Infantry
- Size: 1,016 (Total Strength); 914 (Muster out strength)
- Equipment: Pattern 1853 Enfield Muskets
- Engagements: Mud March ( January 20-24); Battle of Chancellorsville (May 2-5)

Commanders
- Notable commanders: Colonel Alexander P. Berthoud; Lieutenant Colonel William Holt; Lieutenant Colonel Robert R. Honeyman; Major Andrew J. Raub

The 31st New Jersey Infantry Regiment was an infantry regiment that served with the Union Army during the American Civil War. Serving a nine months' service, the regiment went on to participate in Burnside's abortive Mud March, before it was engaged at Chancellorsville.

== Organization ==
The regiment was organized at Flemington, New Jersey, before it was mustered into service on September 17, 1862, for nine months' service.

The regiment was recruited from only two counties; those were Warren and Hunterdon.

== Service ==
Once mustered, 997-strong regiment left Flemington and marched towards Washington DC on September 26, the regiment was initially encamped on Capitol Hill, before changed to Tenleytown; there, it was assigned to Abercrombie's Provisional Brigade, Casey's Division, Defences of Washington. The regiment was stationed in Washington, until November, when it marched to Aquia Creek, Virginia, to perform guard duty on the railroads there.

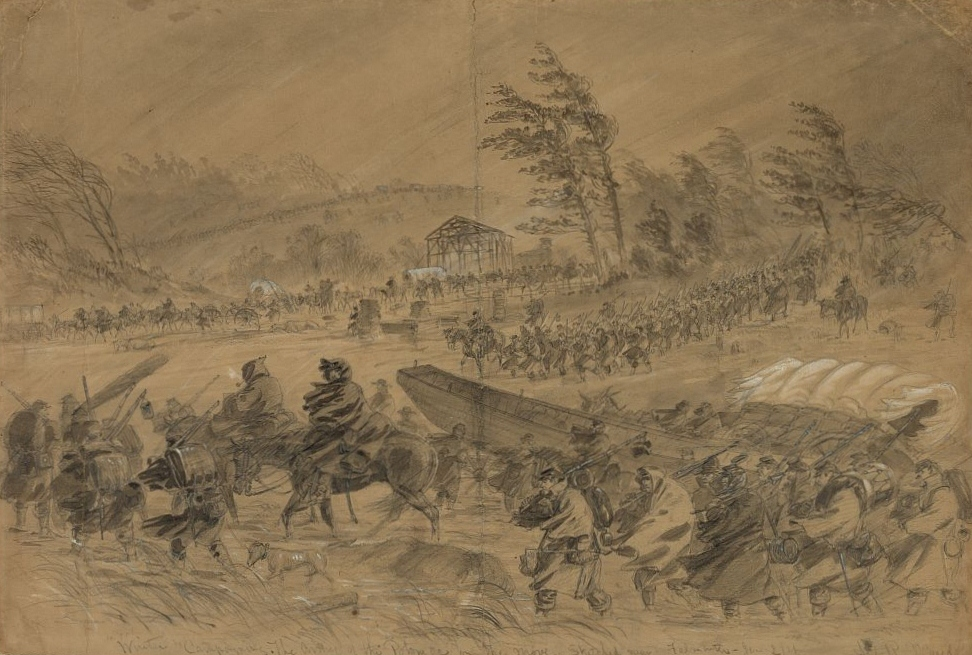
A sketch of the Mud March, taken on January 21, near Falmouth, Virginia.

During December, it was attached to Patrick’s Command, Provost Guard of the Army of the Potomac, before heading to Belle Plain, Virginia and linking up with the army. The regiment participated in Burnside's Mud March before it was sent back to Belle Plain, performing guard and provost duties until, when it joined the Chancellorsville Campaign.

During the Battle of Chancellorsville, despite suffering minimal losses, the regiment performed courageously.

In June 1863, the regiment was ordered back to its home state, where it was mustered out of service on June 24, 1863, at Flemington.

== Organizational affiliation and armaments ==
During its service, the regiment was attached to several larger formations; those were:

- Attached to Abercrombie's Provisional Brigade, Casey's Division, Defences of Washington, to December 1862.
- Patrick's Command, Provost Guard, Army of the Potomac, to January, 1863.
- 3rd Brigade, 1st Division, 1st Army Corps, Army of the Potomac, to June, 1863.

=== Armaments ===
During its service, the regiment was equipped with Enfield Rifled Muskets, and would report their surveys at Chancellorsville:

- A -- 78 Enfield Rifled Muskets. Calibre .58 and .577
- B -- 82 Enfield Rifled Muskets. Calibre .58 and .577
- C -- 78 Enfield Rifled Muskets. Calibre .58 and .577
- D -- 78 Enfield Rifled Muskets. Calibre .58 and .577
- E -- 75 Enfield Rifled Muskets. Calibre .58 and .577
- F -- 78 Enfield Rifled Muskets. Calibre .58 and .577
- G -- 69 Enfield Rifled Muskets. Calibre .58 and .577
- H -- 80 Enfield Rifled Muskets. Calibre .58 and .577
- I -- 72 Enfield Rifled Muskets. Calibre .58 and .577
- K -- 79 Enfield Rifled Muskets. Calibre .58 and .577
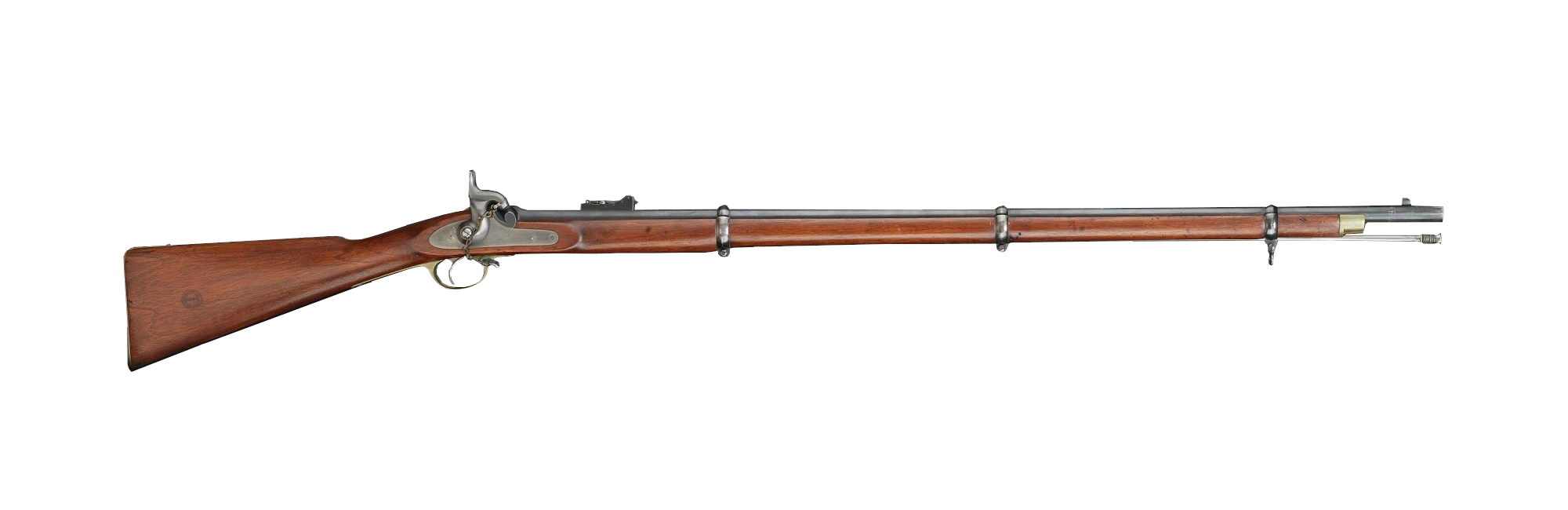
  Pattern 1853 Enfield

== Casualties ==
The total strength of the regiment was 1,016, and it lost 11 by resignation, 39 by discharge, 11 by promotion, 39 by death, and 2 by desertion. The number of men mustered out was 914.

== Commanders ==
- Colonel Alexander P. Berthoud
- Lieutenant Colonel William Holt (Resigned on February 5, 1863)
- Lieutenant Colonel Robert R. Honeyman
- Major Andrew J. Raub

== See also ==
- List of New Jersey units in the American Civil War
- New Jersey in the American Civil War
