= 22nd New Jersey Infantry Regiment =

- Active: September 22, 1862 - June 22, 1863
- Country: United States
- Allegiance: Union
- Branch: Infantry
- Engagements: Battle of Chancellorsville

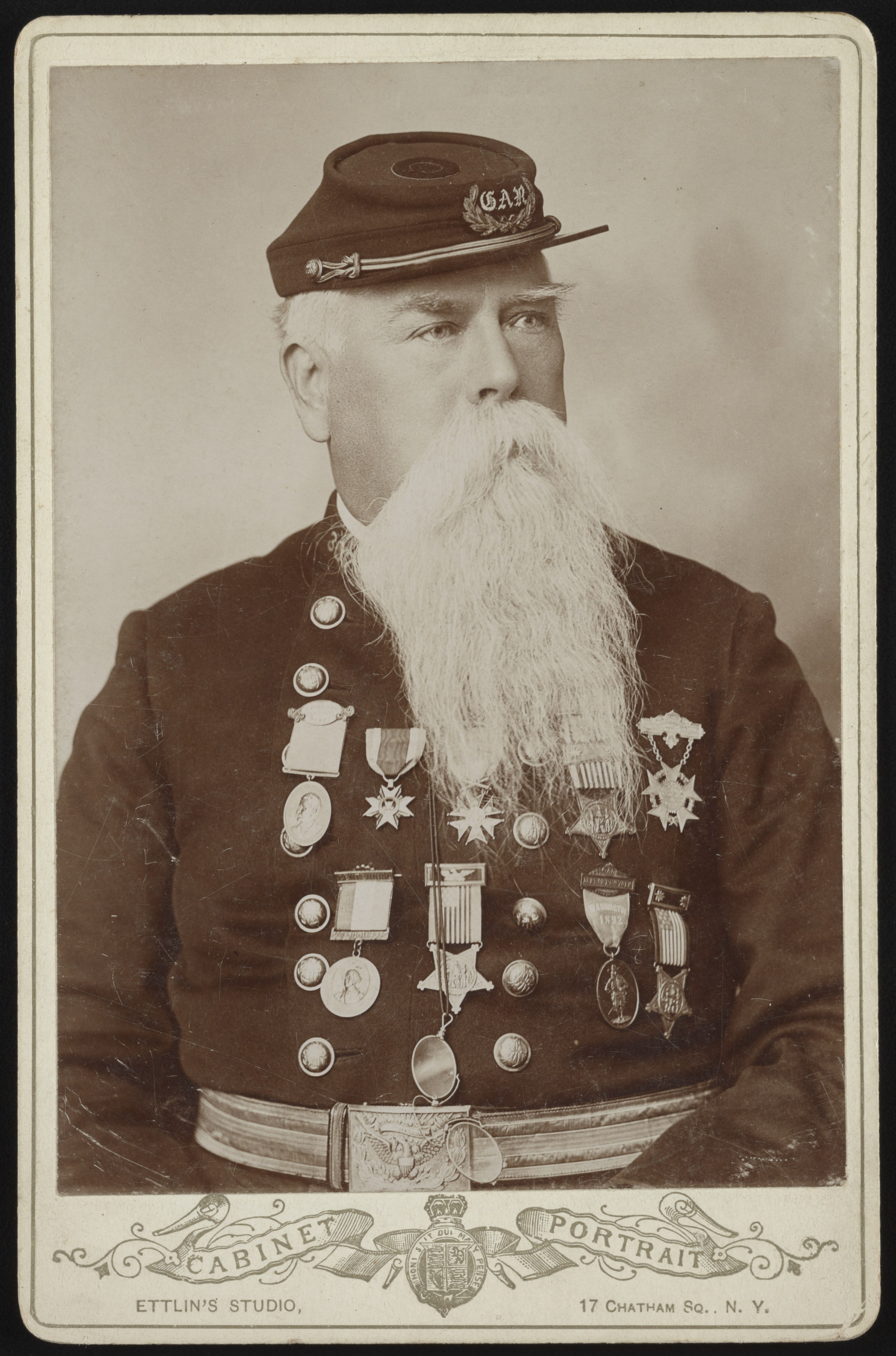
Abraham G. Demarest of Field and Staff, 22nd New Jersey Infantry Regiment, in uniform with medals. From the Liljenquist Family Collection of Civil War Photographs, Prints and Photographs Division, Library of Congress

The 22nd New Jersey Infantry Regiment was an infantry regiment in the Union Army during the American Civil War.

== Service ==
The 22nd New Jersey Infantry Regiment was organized at Trenton, New Jersey for nine-month service and mustered in on September 22, 1862, under the command of Colonel Abraham G. Demarest.

The regiment was attached to Abercrombie's Provisional Brigade, Casey's Division, Defenses of Washington, to December 1862. Patrick's Command, Provost Guard, Army of the Potomac, to January 1863. 3rd Brigade, 1st Division, I Corps, Army of the Potomac, to June 1863.

The 22nd New Jersey Infantry mustered out of service June 22, 1863 at Trenton.

== Detailed service ==
Left New Jersey for Washington, D.C., September 29, 1862. Duty in the defenses of Washington until November 1862. Moved to Aquia Creek, Va., and duty there guarding railroad until January 1863. Moved to Belle Plains and joined the Army of the Potomac January 10, 1863. "Mud March" January 20–24. Duty at Belle Plains until April 27. Chancellorsville Campaign April 27-May 6. Operations at Pollock's Mill Creek April 29-May 2. Battle of Chancellorsville May 2–5. Ordered home for muster out June, reaching Trenton June 22, 1863.

== Casualties ==
The regiment lost a total of 41 men during service; 1 officer and 40 enlisted men died of disease.

== Commanders ==
- Colonel Abraham G. Demarest

== See also ==
- List of New Jersey Civil War units
- New Jersey in the American Civil War
