= 27th New Jersey Infantry Regiment =

- Flag of New Jersey
- Active: September 3, 1862, to July 2, 1863
- Country: United States of America
- Allegiance: Union
- Branch: Union Army
- Type: Infantry
- Engagements: Fredericksburg

The 27th New Jersey Infantry Regiment was an American Civil War infantry regiment from New Jersey that served a nine-month enlistment in the Union Army. It was the only nine-month Regiment from New Jersey with an eleventh Company ("Company L").

The 27th New Jersey Infantry Regiment was recruited from various towns within Morris County, New Jersey and Sussex County, New Jersey, and was mustered into Federal service on September 3, 1862, in Newark, except Company G (Village of Boonton, then part of Pequannock Township) and Company I (Village of Morristown, Morris Township). The regiment trained at Camp Frelinghuysen in Newark before being sent out to join the Army of the Potomac. There, it was attached to the 2nd brigade with Casey's Division, Defenses of Washington, D. C until December, 1862. Next, it was attached to the 9th Army Corps, Army of the Potomac until March 1863 and Army of the Ohio until June 1863.

When their term of service expired in June, the 27th volunteered to remain for 1 more month during the time of the "Pennsylvania Emergency", when Lee's army threatened the north. The 27th was on duty first in Wheeling, West Virginia, then they moved to Pittsburgh, Pennsylvania, and finally to guard a bridge at Harrisburg, Pennsylvania, June 26, 1863.

The regiment fought in one engagement: the December 1862 Battle of Fredericksburg.

After serving its nine-month enlistment, the regiment was mustered out on July 2, 1863. Many of the veterans of the 27th New Jersey went on to serve in other regiments, most notably the 33rd New Jersey Volunteer Infantry, which was led by Colonel George W. Mindil and the 39th New Jersey Volunteer Infantry.

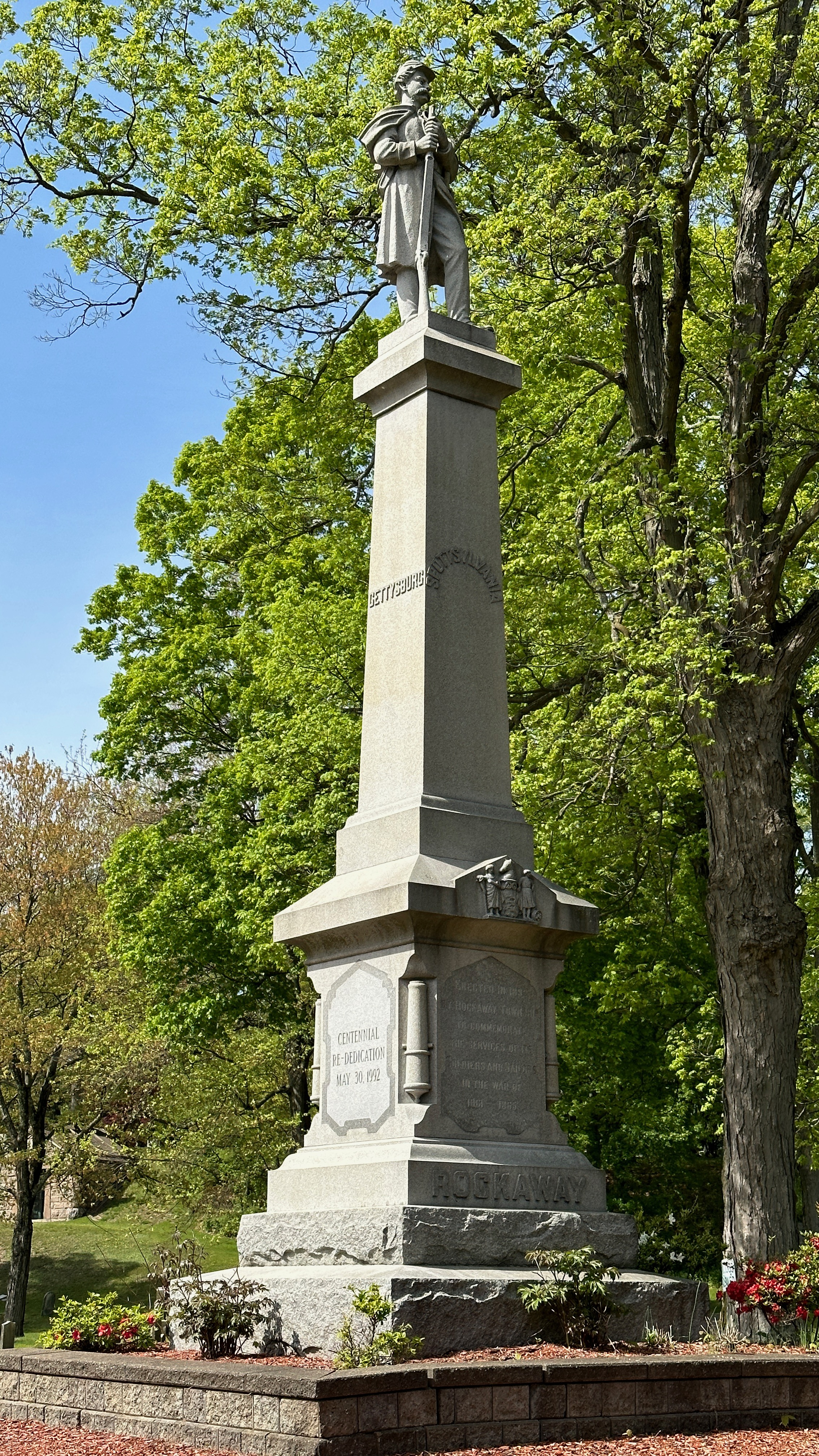
Rockaway Civil War Monument

The Regiment lost 33 members on May 6, 1863, while crossing the Cumberland River in Kentucky. Only the bodies of 7 of those that drowned were recovered and buried at the Mill Springs National Cemetery, Logan Cross Roads, Kentucky. 19 members from Company L, which was recruited mostly from Rockaway Township, were memorialized in the Rockaway Presbyterian Church cemetery. There is a large Standing Soldier Monument in Sparta of a Civil War soldier that was erected in 1900 by James R. Titman, a member of the 27th and 33rd Regiments of the New Jersey Volunteers. The monument honors all the brave soldiers who served on land and sea in defense of their country in any of the wars of the US.

== Original Field and Staff ==
Mustered in September 1862:

- Colonel George W. Mindil
- Lieutenant Colonel Edwin S. Babcock
- Major Augustus D. Blanchet - originally vacant
- Adjutant J. Kearney Smith
- Quartermaster James B. Titman
- Surgeon John B. Richmond
- Assistant Surgeon J. Henry Stiger
- Assistant Surgeon Charles H. Sudyam
- Chaplain John Faull
- Sergeant Major John H. Medcraft

== Original company commanders ==
- Company A - Captain Charles F. Fernald
  - First Lieutenant Thamer Snover
  - Second Lieutenant Robert M. Pettitt
- Company B - Captain John T. Alexander
  - First Lieutenant Jacob M. Stewart
  - Second Lieutenant George Hance
- Company C - Captain Nelson H. Drake
  - First Lieutenant Ferdinand V. Wolfe
  - Second Lieutenant David S. Allen
- Company D - Captain Thomas Anderson
  - First Lieutenant Nathaniel K. Bray
  - Second Lieutenant John B. Grover
- Company E - Captain Augustus Blanchet
  - First Lieutenant George W. Crane
  - Second Lieutenant Hudson Kitchell
- Company F - Captain Daniel Bailey
  - First Lieutenant George W. Cooke
  - Second Lieutenant James Peters
- Company G - Captain James Plant
  - First Lieutenant George S. Esten
  - Second Lieutenant George Anthony
- Company H - Captain Samuel Dennis
  - First Lieutenant John M. Rosencrance
  - Second Lieutenant Jesse Rosencrance
- Company I - Captain Alfred H. Condict
  - First Lieutenant Peter Churchfield
  - Second Lieutenant David H. Ayres
- Company K - Captain Henry A. Franks
  - First Lieutenant Sydney Smith
  - Second Lieutenant Edward S. Baldwin
- Company L - Captain Henry F. Willis
  - First Lieutenant Stephen H. Marsh
  - Second Lieutenant Joseph C. Bower

== See also ==
- List of New Jersey Civil War Units
