= 8th New Jersey Infantry Regiment =

- Active: September 14, 1861 – July 17, 1865
- Country: United States of America
- Allegiance: Union
- Branch: Infantry
- Engagements: Siege of Yorktown; Battle of Williamsburg; Battle of Seven Pines; Seven Days Battles; Battle of Groveton; Second Battle of Bull Run; Battle of Chantilly; Battle of Fredericksburg; Battle of Chancellorsville; Battle of Gettysburg; Bristoe Campaign; Mine Run Campaign; Battle of the Wilderness; Battle of Spotsylvania Court House; Battle of Cold Harbor; Siege of Petersburg; First Battle of Deep Bottom; Second Battle of Deep Bottom; Second Battle of Ream's Station; Battle of Peebles' Farm; Battle of Boydton Plank Road; Battle of Hatcher's Run; Battle of Fort Stedman; Battle of Sailor's Creek; Appomattox Campaign

The 8th New Jersey Infantry Regiment was an infantry regiment in the Union Army during the American Civil War.

== Service ==
The 8th New Jersey Infantry Regiment was organized at Camp Olden in Trenton, New Jersey, for three years service and mustered in September 14, 1861, under the command of Colonel Adolphus J. Johnson.

The regiment was attached to Casey's Provisional Brigade, Division of the Potomac, October 1861. 3rd Brigade, Hooker's Division, Army of the Potomac, to March 1862. 3rd Brigade, 2nd Division, III Corps, Army of the Potomac, to March 1864. 1st Brigade, 4th Division, II Corps, to May 1864. 3rd Brigade, 3rd Division, II Corps, to July 1865.

The 8th New Jersey Infantry mustered out of service July 17, 1865.

== Detailed service ==
Left New Jersey for Washington, D.C., October 1, 1861. At Meridian Hill until December 6, 1861. Expedition to lower Maryland November 3–11. Duty at Budd's Ferry, Md., until April 1862. Moved to the Virginia Peninsula April 5–8. Siege of Yorktown, Va., April 10-May 4. Battle of Williamsburg May 5. Battle of Seven Pines May 31-June 1. Duty near Seven Pines until June 25. Seven Days before Richmond June 25-July 1. Action at Oak Grove, near Seven Pines, June 25. Battles of Savage Station June 29, Glendale June 30, Malvern Hill July 1. At Harrison's Landing until August 15. Movement to Centreville August 15–26. Pope's Campaign in northern Virginia August 26-September 2. Action at Bristoe Station (or Kettle Run) August 27. Battles of Groveton August 29, Bull Run August 30, Chantilly September 1. Duty in the defenses of Washington, D.C., until November 1. Movement to Falmouth, Va., November 1–28. Duty near Falmouth, Va., November 28-December 11. Battle of Fredericksburg, Va., December 12–15. At Falmouth until April 27, 1863. "Mud March" January 20–24. Operations at Rappahannock Bridge and Grove Church February 5–7. Chancellorsville Campaign April 27-May 6. Battle of Chancellorsville May 1–5. Gettysburg Campaign June 11-July 24. Battle of Gettysburg July 1–3. Pursuit of Lee to Manassas Gap, Va., July 5–24. Wapping Heights, Va.. July 23. Duty near Warrenton, Va., until October. Bristoe Campaign October 9–22. McLean's Ford October 15. Advance to line of the Rappahannock November 7–8. Kelly's Ford November 7. Mine Run Campaign November 26-December 2. Payne's Farm November 27. Duty near Brandy Station until May 1864. Demonstration on the Rapidan February 6–7. Campaign from the Rapidan to the James May 3-June 15. Battles of the Wilderness May 5–7, Spotsylvania May 8–12, Spotsylvania Court House May 12–21. Assault on the Salient ("Bloody Angle") May 12. Harris Farm, or Fredericksburg Road, May 19. North Anna River May 23–26. Ox Ford May 23–24. On line of the Pamunkey May 26–28. Totopotomoy May 28–31. Cold Harbor June 1–12. Before Petersburg June 16–18. Siege of Petersburg June 16, 1864, to April 2. 1865. Jerusalem Plank Road June 22–23, 1864. Demonstration north of the James July 27–29. Deep Bottom July 27–28. Demonstration north of the James August 13–20. Strawberry Plains, Deep Bottom, August 14–18. Ream's Station August 25. Fort Sedgwick September 10. Poplar Springs Church September 29-October 2. Yellow House October 2–5. Boydton Plank Road, Hatcher's Run, October 27–28. Warren's Raid on Weldon Railroad December 7–12. Dabney's Mills, Hatcher's Run, February 5–7, 1865. Watkins' House March 25. Appomattox Campaign March 28-April 9. Boydton and White Oak Roads March 30–31. Crow's House March 31. Fall of Petersburg April 2. Pursuit of Lee April 3–9. Sailor's Creek April 6. High Bridge, Farmville, April 7. Appomattox Court House April 9. Surrender of Lee and his army. March to Washington. D.C., May 2–12. Grand Review of the Armies May 23. Duty at Washington until July.

== Casualties ==
The regiment lost a total of 286 men during service; 9 officers and 167 enlisted men killed or mortally wounded, 1 officer and 109 enlisted men died of disease.

== Commanders ==
- Colonel Adolphus J. Johnson – resigned March 19, 1863
- Colonel John Ramsey
- Major Henry Hartford – commanded at the Battle of Hatcher's Run
- Captain John Langton – commanded at the Battle of Gettysburg after Col Ramsey was wounded in action, July 2

== See also ==
- List of New Jersey Civil War units
- New Jersey in the American Civil War
