= 25th New Jersey Infantry Regiment =

- Flag of New Jersey
- Active: September 1, 1862, to June 20, 1863
- Country: United States of America
- Allegiance: Union
- Branch: Union Army
- Type: Infantry
- Engagements: Fredericksburg, Siege of Suffolk

The 25th New Jersey Infantry Regiment was an American Civil War infantry regiment from New Jersey that served a nine-month enlistment in the Union Army.

The 25th New Jersey Infantry Regiment was organized with five companies ("A", "C", "E", "H", & "K") from Passaic County, New Jersey, in Northern New Jersey. Companies F, G and I were recruited from Cape May County, New Jersey, Company D from Cumberland County, New Jersey and Company B from Atlantic County, New Jersey. The regiment trained at Camp in Beverly, before being sent out to Washington, DC. There, it was attached to the 2nd brigade Casey's Division, Defenses of Washington, D. C until December, 1862. Next it was attached to the 1st Brigade, 3rd Division, 9th Army Corps, Army of the Potomac, to February, 1863 and then to the 3rd Brigade until April, 1863. Finally, it was attached to the 3rd Brigade, 2nd Division, 7th Army Corps to June, 1863.

The regiment fought in two engagements–the December, 1862 Battle of Fredericksburg and the Siege of Suffolk, April 11 - May 4, 1863.

Many of the veterans of the 25th New Jersey went on to serve in other regiments, most notably the 33rd New Jersey Volunteer Infantry, and the 38th New Jersey Volunteer Infantry.

== Original Field and Staff ==
Mustered in September, 1862:

- Colonel Andrew Derrom
- Lieutenant Colonel Enoch J. Ayres (originally vacant)
- Major John K. Brown
- Adjutant Daniel B. Murphy
- Quartermaster James Inglis, Jr. (originally vacant)
- Surgeon James Riley
- Assistant Surgeon Robert M. Bateman
- Assistant Surgeon Seffrine Daily
- Chaplain Francis E. Butler
- Sergeant Major Charles J. Field

== Original company commanders ==
- Company A - Captain John McKiernan
  - First Lieutenant Andrew Rogers
  - Second Lieutenant Thomas B. Richards
- Company B - Captain Somers T. Champion
  - First Lieutenant Jethro V. Albertson
  - Second Lieutenant David Saners Risley
- Company C - Captain Archibald Graham
  - First Lieutenant Columbus Force
  - Second Lieutenant Robert Parmley
- Company D - Captain Ethan T. Garretson
  - First Lieutenant Samuel Peacock
  - Second Lieutenant Joseph Bateman
- Company E - Captain Alexander Holmes
  - First Lieutenant George P. Freeman
  - Second Lieutenant Charles M. Marsh
- Company F - Captain David Blenkow
  - First Lieutenant Nicholas W. Godfrey
  - Second Lieutenant Henry Y. Willets
- Company G - Captain Charles R. Powell
  - First Lieutenant Ewing W. Tibbles
  - Second Lieutenant Nicholas Corson
- Company H - Captain James Inglis, Jr
  - First Lieutenant Harvey Beyea
  - Second Lieutenant Cornelius Van Wagoner
- Company I - Captain Philetus A. Stevens
  - First Lieutenant John F. Tomlin
  - Second Lieutenant Samuel E. Douglass
- Company K - Captain Enoch J. Ayres
  - First Lieutenant Edward R. Spear
  - Second Lieutenant Lewis A. Pidget

== See also ==
- List of New Jersey Civil War Units
