= List of New Jersey units in the American Civil War =

== Infantry ==
- 1st New Jersey Volunteer Infantry Regiment
- 2nd New Jersey Volunteer Infantry Regiment
- 3rd New Jersey Volunteer Infantry Regiment
- 4th New Jersey Volunteer Infantry Regiment
- 5th New Jersey Volunteer Infantry Regiment
- 6th New Jersey Volunteer Infantry Regiment
- 7th New Jersey Volunteer Infantry Regiment
- 8th New Jersey Volunteer Infantry Regiment
- 9th New Jersey Volunteer Infantry Regiment
- 10th New Jersey Volunteer Infantry Regiment
- 11th New Jersey Volunteer Infantry Regiment
- 12th New Jersey Volunteer Infantry Regiment
- 13th New Jersey Volunteer Infantry Regiment
- 14th New Jersey Volunteer Infantry Regiment
- 15th New Jersey Volunteer Infantry Regiment
- 16th New Jersey Volunteer Infantry Regiment
- 17th New Jersey Volunteer Infantry Regiment
- 18th New Jersey Volunteer Infantry Regiment
- 19th New Jersey Volunteer Infantry Regiment
- 20th New Jersey Volunteer Infantry Regiment
- 21st New Jersey Volunteer Infantry Regiment
- 22nd New Jersey Volunteer Infantry Regiment
- 23rd New Jersey Volunteer Infantry Regiment
- 24th New Jersey Volunteer Infantry Regiment
- 25th New Jersey Volunteer Infantry Regiment
- 26th New Jersey Volunteer Infantry Regiment
- 27th New Jersey Volunteer Infantry Regiment
- 28th New Jersey Volunteer Infantry Regiment
- 29th New Jersey Volunteer Infantry Regiment
- 30th New Jersey Volunteer Infantry Regiment
- 31st New Jersey Volunteer Infantry Regiment
- 32nd New Jersey Volunteer Infantry Regiment
- 33rd New Jersey Volunteer Infantry Regiment
- 34th New Jersey Volunteer Infantry Regiment
- 35th New Jersey Volunteer Infantry Regiment
- 36th New Jersey Volunteer Infantry Regiment
- 37th New Jersey Volunteer Infantry Regiment
- 38th New Jersey Volunteer Infantry Regiment
- 39th New Jersey Volunteer Infantry Regiment
- 40th New Jersey Volunteer Infantry Regiment

== Cavalry ==
- 1st New Jersey Volunteer Cavalry Regiment
- 2nd New Jersey Volunteer Cavalry Regiment
- 3rd New Jersey Volunteer Cavalry Regiment

== Artillery ==
- Battery A, 1st New Jersey Light Artillery ("Hexamer's" Battery)
- Battery B, 1st New Jersey Light Artillery
- Battery C, 1st New Jersey Light Artillery
- 4th Battery "D" New Jersey Volunteer Light Artillery
- 5th Battery "E" New Jersey Volunteer Light Artillery

== Brigades ==
- First New Jersey Brigade (1st, 2nd, 3rd, 4th, 10th, 15th, 23rd and 40th Infantry Regiments)
- Second New Jersey Brigade (5th, 6th, 7th and 8th NJ Inf Regts)

== See also ==
- Lists of American Civil War Regiments by State
