= 24th New Jersey Volunteer Infantry Regiment =

- State Flag of New Jersey
- Active: September 16, 1862 - June 29, 1863.
- Country: United States
- Branch: Union Army
- Type: Infantry
- Size: 994 (Total Strength, 1,266 on total rosters
- Part of: Army of the Potomac
- Equipment: Belgian Rifles
- Engagements: Battle of Fredericksburg; Battle of Chancellorsville

Commanders
- Notable commanders: Colonel William B. Robertson Lieutenant Colonel Franklin L. Knight Major Joel A. Fithian

The 24th New Jersey Volunteer Infantry was an infantry regiment that served for nine months in the Union Army during the American Civil War.

== Organization ==
The regiment was organized at Camp Cadwaller, September 16, 1862, in Beverly, New Jersey. The men were recruited from several counties in Southern New Jersey, such as:

- Cumberland County: Provided Companies B, F, G and H.
- Salem County: Provided Companies A, C and K.
- Gloucester County: Provided Company E and parts of Companies D and I.
- Camden County: Provided men for Companies D and I.

== Service ==
After leaving New Jersey, the regiment went to Washington D.C. They were equipped with Belgian rifles and spent their first months conducting guard duty for the city. They stayed in several camps, such as Camp Ingham and Camp Nixon. Their main jobs were:

- Conducting picket duty
- Fatigue duty

In December, the regiment was attached to the II Corps of the Army of the Potomac. They marched to Falmouth, Virginia, and fought in the Battle of Fredericksburg.

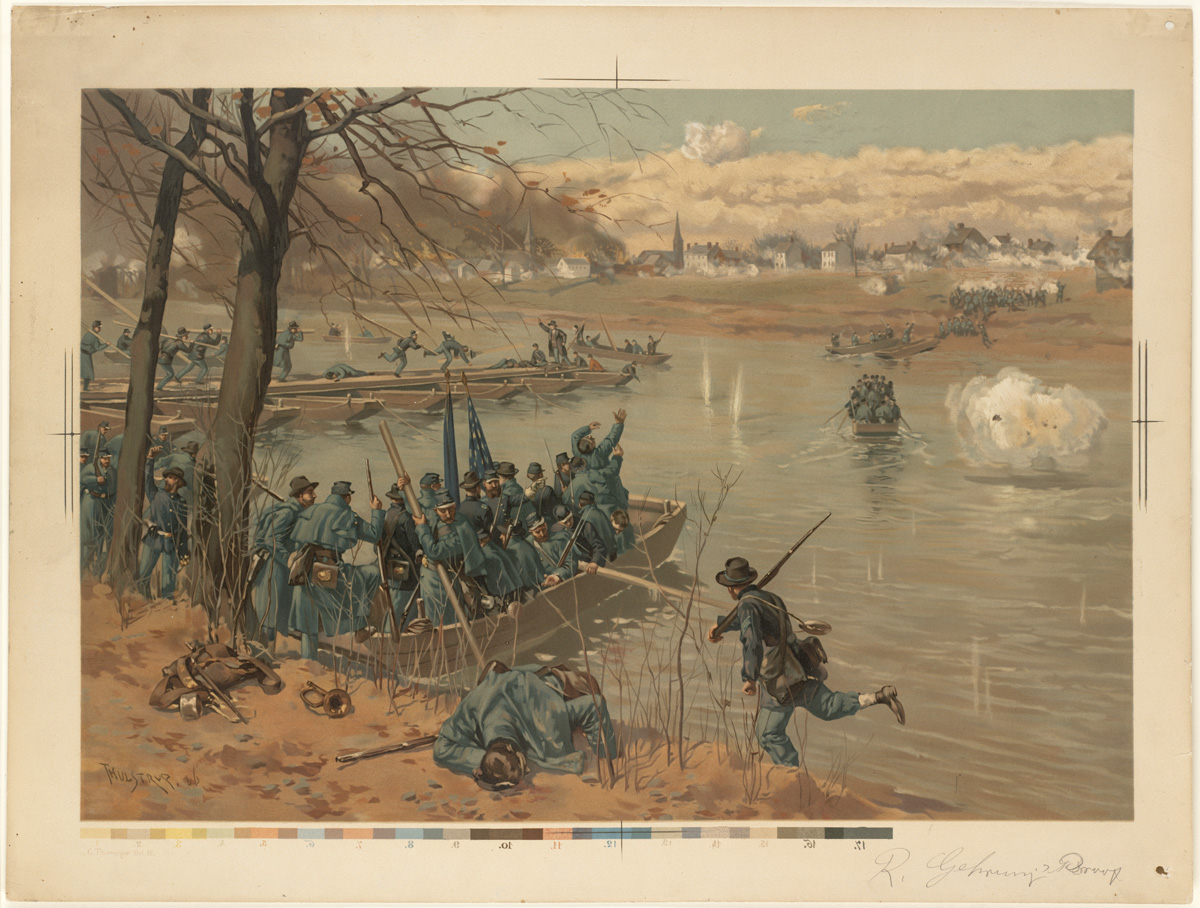
The regiment suffered heavy casualties during the fighting, with at least 160 men killed or mortally wounded, including many officers.

The regiment suffered heavy casualties, they lost 160 men during the fighting, including many officers, who were severely injured, those included:

- Captain William C. Shinn: Wounded in the eye
- Lieutenant James J. Reeves: Wounded in the arm
- Captain Aaron Ward: Shot through the lung

After spending the winter at Camp Robertson, the 24th participated in the Chancellorsville Campaign in May 1963. While they were heavily involved in the campaign, their losses were smaller compared at Fredericksburg, with about 40 men killed or wounded.

After the campaign, their nine-month enlistments ended, they returned to Beverly, New Jersey, and was mustered out of service on June 29, 1863.

== Armaments ==
The regiment was primarily equipped with Belgian rifles of the Vincennes Rifles, and the regiment reported the following surveys at Fredericksburg and Chancellorsville:

=== Fredericksburg ===
- A -- 56 Belgian or Vincennes Rifles, sabre bayonet. Calibre .69 to .71
- B -- 46 Belgian or Vincennes Rifles, sabre bayonet. Calibre .69 to .71
- C -- 42 Belgian or Vincennes Rifles, sabre bayonet. Calibre .69 to .71
- D -- 43 Belgian or Vincennes Rifles, sabre bayonet. Calibre .69 to .71
- E -- 44 Belgian or Vincennes Rifles, sabre bayonet. Calibre .69 to .71
- F -- 56 Belgian or Vincennes Rifles, sabre bayonet. Calibre .69 to .71
- G -- 44 Belgian or Vincennes Rifles, sabre bayonet. Calibre .69 to .71
- H -- 56 Belgian or Vincennes Rifles, sabre bayonet. Calibre .69 to .71
- I -- 27 Belgian or Vincennes Rifles, sabre bayonet. Calibre .69 to .71
- K -- 29 Belgian or Vincennes Rifles, sabre bayonet. Calibre .69 to .71

=== Chancellorsville ===
- A -- 50 Enfield Rifled Muskets. Calibre .58 and .577
- B -- 54 Enfield Rifled Muskets. Calibre .58 and .577
- C -- 45 Enfield Rifled Muskets. Calibre .58 and .577
- D -- 50 Enfield Rifled Muskets. Calibre .58 and .577
- E -- 41 Enfield Rifled Muskets. Calibre .58 and .577
- F -- 62 Enfield Rifled Muskets. Calibre .58 and .577
- G -- 46 Enfield Rifled Muskets. Calibre .58 and .577
- H -- 66 Enfield Rifled Muskets. Calibre .58 and .577
- I -- 46 Enfield Rifled Muskets. Calibre .58 and .577
- K -- 47 Enfield Rifled Muskets. Calibre .58 and .577
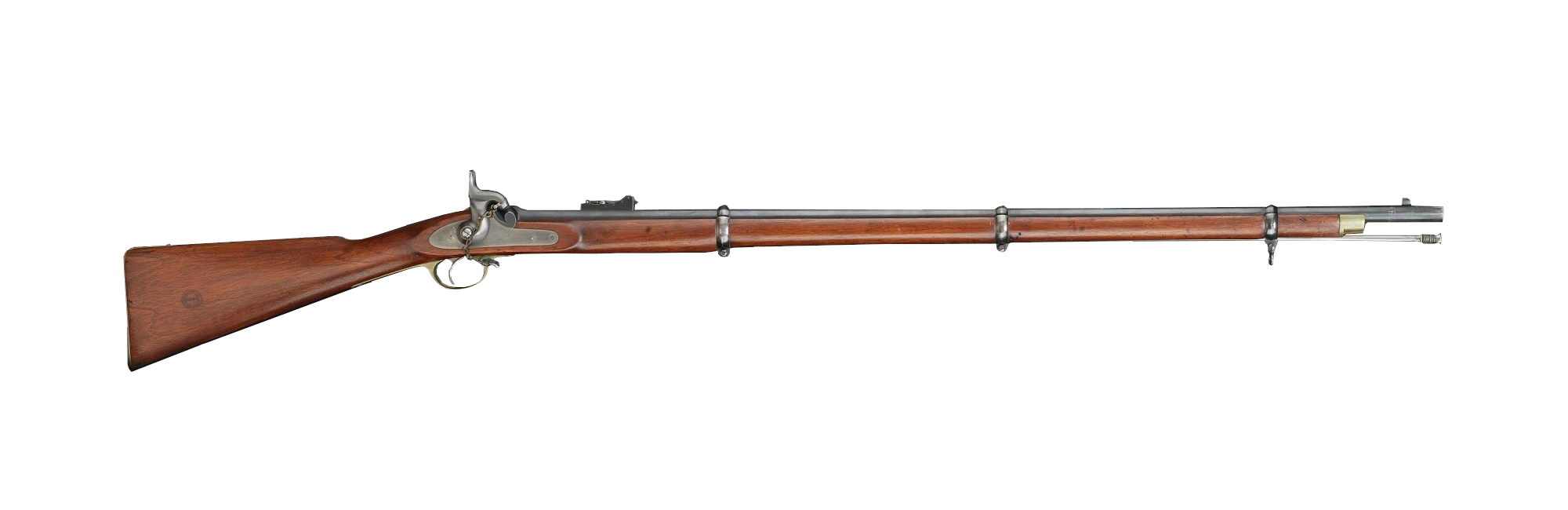
  Pattern 1853 Enfield

== Notable commanders ==
- Col. William B. Robertson
- Lt. Col. Franklin L. Knight
- Maj. Joel A. Fithian

== Total strength and casualties ==
The total strength of the regiment was 994, and lost 3 officers and 46 enlisted men killed or mortally wounded, and 53 enlisted men died of disease.

== See also ==
- List of New Jersey units in the American Civil War
- New Jersey in the American Civil War
