= 127th Pennsylvania Infantry Regiment =

- Active: August 16, 1862 – May 29, 1863
- Country: United States
- Allegiance: Union
- Branch: United States Army
- Engagements: Battle of Fredericksburg; Battle of Chancellorsville; Battle of Salem Church

Commanders
- Notable Commanders: William W. Jennings

The 127th Pennsylvania Infantry Regiment was a regiment in the Union Army during the American Civil War. As part of the Second Corps of the Army of the Potomac, it fought in battles such as Fredericksburg and Chancellorsville.

== History ==
=== Recruitment ===
The 127th Pennsylvania was primarily composed of recruits from the city of Harrisburg and its environs. Initially commanded by Colonel William W. Jennings, its members were officially mustered in on August 16, 1862.

On August 17, 1862, members of the regiment were assigned to the defense of Washington, D.C., and then, in December 1862, to the Second Corps of the Army of the Potomac.

== Monuments ==
There is a monument to the 127th Pennsylvania at Fredericksburg and Spotsylvania National Military Park.
