= 27th Connecticut Infantry Regiment =

- Active: October 1862 – July 27, 1863
- Country: United States
- Allegiance: Union
- Branch: Infantry
- Engagements: Battle of Fredericksburg; Battle of Chancellorsville; Battle of Gettysburg

The 27th Connecticut Infantry Regiment was an infantry regiment recruited in New Haven, Connecticut, for service in the American Civil War.

== Organization ==
The 27th Connecticut Infantry Regiment was raised in the late summer of 1862 in response to President Abraham Lincoln's nationwide call for volunteers to put down the rebellion. The regiment would serve for a nine-month enlistment, unlike the usual three-year enlistments, inducing many older, married men to answer the call. This is evident by the fact that the average age of the 27th Connecticut was 27 years, about six years older than the average age of Union soldiers in general.

The 27th Connecticut departed for Washington, D.C., on October 22 and was attached to the Military District of Washington until November 7, 1862. It was then attached to the 3rd Brigade, 1st Division, 2nd Army Corps, Army of the Potomac, and it advanced to Falmouth, Virginia.

== War history ==
In its nine months of service, the 27th fought in the three largest campaigns in the eastern theatre of the war. First at the Battle of Fredericksburg, on December 13, 1862, during which they launched an attack up Marye's Heights under their brigade commander Col. Samuel K. Zook.

Their second taste of combat was the Battle of Chancellorsville, on May 1, 2 and 3, 1863. On May 3, eight out of 10 companies making up the 27th were captured after fighting a fierce delaying action holding back Confederate forces so the Union Army could reorganize itself and hold off the confederates.

Finally, the 27th Connecticut embarked on their last campaign of their nine-month service which culminated with the campaign and Battle of Gettysburg, on July 1, 2 and 3, 1863. Here, in the late afternoon of July 2, the 27th entered the battle with a total of 3 companies only 160 men out of the original 829 who had joined just nine months earlier. They occupied the portion of the union line known as "The Wheatfield," where the regiment successfully held back the rebels. By the end of the battle, 10 men were dead, 23 wounded, and 4 were missing. Among the regiment's casualties was Regimental Commander Lt. Col. Henry C. Merwin, who was struck by a bullet. After his death, Maj. James H. Colburn took command of the regiment for the rest of its service.

On July 18, 1863, what remained of the 27th was released from the Army of the Potomac and sent back to New Haven to be discharged. On the way home to Connecticut, they were reunited with 279 men who were captured at Chancellorsville, and had been paroled by the Confederates in a prisoner exchange.

== Casualties ==
In its nine months of service, the Regiment lost 533 men who were killed, wounded, captured, and died of disease out of 829 enrolled.

== Equipment ==
Forage Cap, Slouch Cap, Frock Coat, Slouch Coat, Trousers, Socks, Shirts, Brogans, Coat, Blanket, Cartridge Box, Cap Box, Belt, Bayonet, Bayonet Scabbard, Poncho, Canteen, Haversack, Knapsack, Tent shelter-half, Cup, Plate, Fork, Spoon, Knife, Rifle Sling, and Springfield Rifled Musket .58 Caliber Model 1861

== See also ==
- List of Connecticut Civil War units
