= 29th New York Infantry Regiment =

- Active: June 6, 1861, to July 1, 1865
- Country: United States
- Allegiance: Union
- Branch: Infantry
- Engagements: Battle of First Bull Run; Battle of Cross Keys; Battle of Second Bull Run; Battle of Chancellorsville

The 29th New York Infantry Regiment, the "Astor Rifles" or "1st German Infantry", was an infantry regiment that served in the Union Army during the American Civil War.

== Service ==
The regiment was organized in New York City, New York, and was mustered in for a two-year enlistment on June 6, 1861.

The regiment was mustered out of service on June 20, 1863, and those men who had signed three year enlistments or who re-enlisted were mustered as the Independent Company, 29th New York Infantry until they were transferred to the 68th New York on April 19, 1864.

== Total strength and casualties ==
The regiment suffered 8 officers and 107 enlisted men who were killed in action or mortally wounded and 1 officer and 158 enlisted men who died of disease, for a total of 274 fatalities.

== Commanders ==
- Colonel Adolph von Steinwehr

== Flags ==
One of the Flank Markers carried by the regiment

Prussian flag raised over the officers tent in February of 1862

== See also ==
- List of New York Civil War regiments
