= Calvin Edward Pratt =

American lawyer and judge

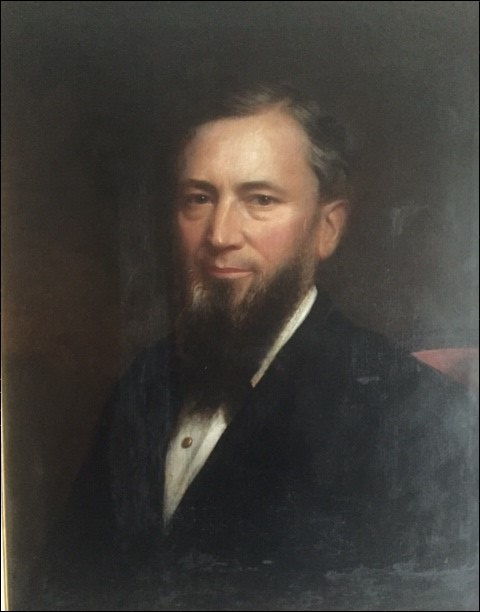
Calvin E. Pratt

Calvin Edward Pratt (1828–1896) was an American lawyer and judge. He also served in the Union Army during the American Civil War as Major, Colonel, and finally Brigadier General.

== Sources ==
- Warner, Ezra J. (1964). "Calvin Edward Pratt". Generals in Blue: Lives of the Union Commanders. Baton Rouge: Louisiana State University Press. p. 385.
- "Calvin E. Pratt". Historical Society of the New York Courts. Retrieved March 17, 2023.
