= Louis Raymond Francine =

Officer in the Union Army during the American Civil War

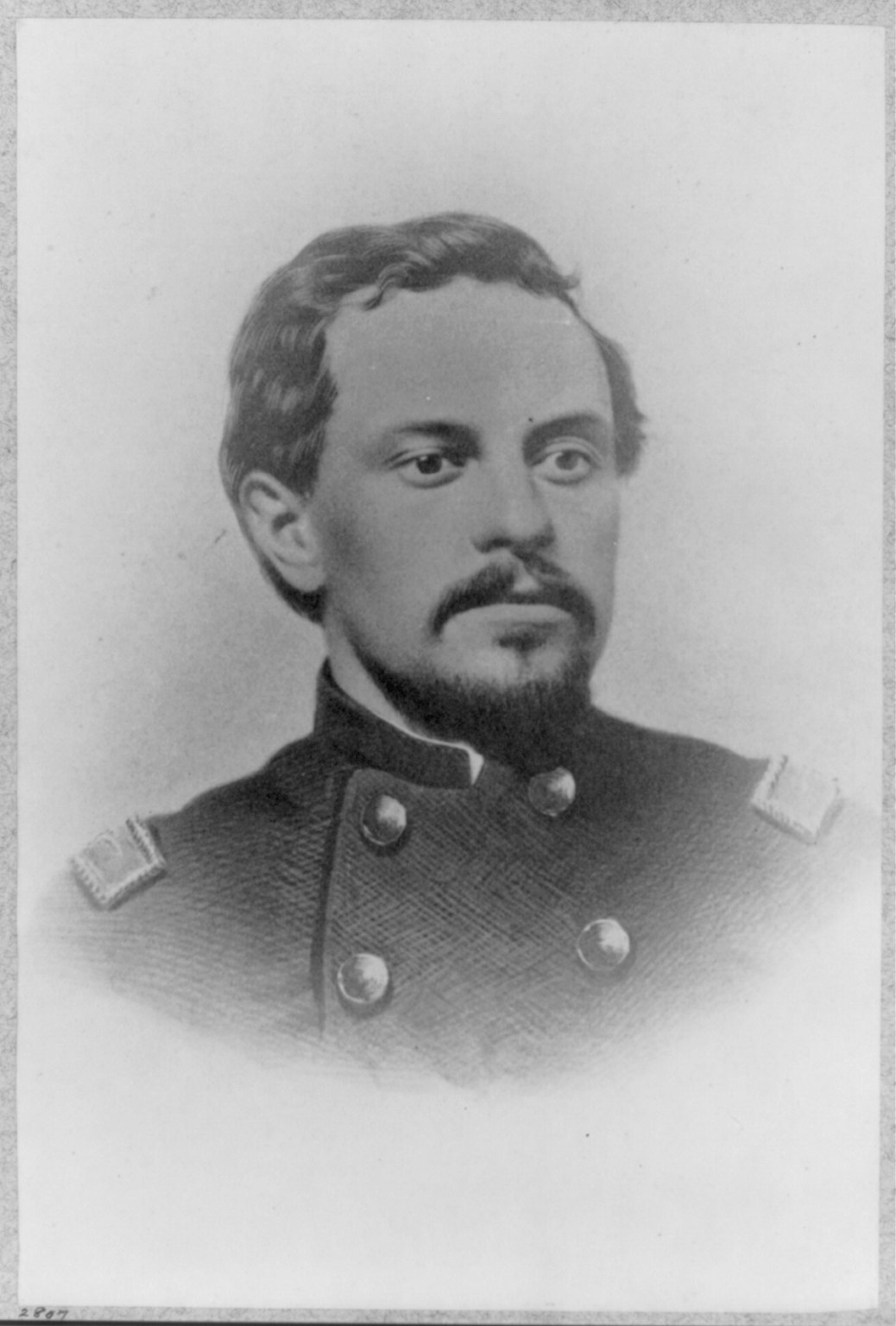
- Born: March 26, 1837; Philadelphia, Pennsylvania
- Died: July 16, 1863 (aged 26); Philadelphia, Pennsylvania
- Military career
- Allegiance: Union
- Branch: Union Army
- Rank: Colonel; Bvt. Brigadier general
- Battles: American Civil War; Battle of Gettysburg (DOW)

Louis Raymond Francine (1837–1863) was a soldier in the Union Army during the American Civil War.

== Career ==
Louis Raymond Francine enlisted, and was commissioned a captain in the 7th New Jersey Infantry Regiment on August 23, 1861; lieutenant colonel on July 8, 1862; and colonel on December 9. He was brevetted brigadier general in the United States Volunteers on July 2, 1863, for gallantry and meritorious service at the Battle of Gettysburg, Pennsylvania, where he was mortally wounded on July 2, 1863, and of which he died on July 16, 1863.

== See also ==
- List of American Civil War brevet generals (Union)

== Sources ==
- Chemerka, William R. (2013). General Joseph Warren Revere: The Gothic Saga of Paul Revere's Grandson. Duncan, OK: BearManor Media. pp. 36, 39, 41, 45, 49, 58–60, 112.
- Heitman, Francis B. (1903). "Francine, Louis R.". Historical Register and Dictionary of the United States Army, From Its Organization, September 29, 1789, to March 2, 1903. Vol. 1. Washington, D.C.: Government Printing Office. p. 433.
- Malcolm, Jim, ed. (2011). The Civil War Journal of Private Heyward Emmell, Ambulance and Infantry Corps: A Very Disagreeable War. Fairleigh Dickinson University Press. pp. 18–75.
- Tucker, Phillip Thomas (2013). Barksdale's Charge: The True High Tide of the Confederacy at Gettysburg. Philadelphia, PA: Casemate. pp. 68, 201.
