= 136th Pennsylvania Infantry Regiment =

Union Army infantry regiment

136th Pennsylvania Volunteer Infantry
- Active: August 20, 1862 - May 29, 1863
- Country: United States
- Allegiance: Union
- Branch: Infantry
- Engagements: Battle of Fredericksburg; Battle of Chancellorsville

The 136th Pennsylvania Volunteer Infantry was an infantry regiment that served in the Union Army during the American Civil War.

== Service ==
The 136th Pennsylvania Infantry was organized at Harrisburg, Pennsylvania, and mustered in for a nine-month enlistment beginning August 22, 1862, under the command of Colonel Thomas McKee Bayne.

The regiment was attached to 2nd Brigade, 2nd Division, I Corps, Army of the Potomac.

The 136th Pennsylvania Infantry mustered out of service on May 29, 1863.

== Detailed service ==
Moved to Washington, D.C., August 29, and duty there until September 29. Moved to Fort Frederick, Md., then to Sharpsburg. Duty at Sharpsburg, Md., until October 30. Movement to Falmouth, Va., October 30-November 19. Battle of Fredericksburg, Va., December 12–15. Burnside's 2nd Campaign, "Mud March," January 20–24, 1863. Duty at Falmouth and Belle Plains until April 27. Chancellorsville Campaign April 27-May 6. Operations at Pollock's Mill Creek April 29-May 2. Fitzhugh's Crossing April 29–30. Battle of Chancellorsville May 2–5.

== Casualties ==
The regiment lost a total of 56 men during service; 3 officers and 23 enlisted men killed or mortally wounded, 30 enlisted men died of disease.

== Commanders ==
- Colonel Thomas McKee Bayne

== See also ==
- List of Pennsylvania Civil War Units
- Pennsylvania in the Civil War
