= 11th New Jersey Infantry Regiment =

- Active: May 1862 to June 1865
- Country: United States of America
- Allegiance: Union
- Branch: Infantry
- Engagements: Battle of Fredericksburg; Battle of Chancellorsville; Battle of Gettysburg; Battle of Beverly Ford; Battle of Locust Grove; Battle of Mine Run; Battle of Spotsylvania Court House; Battle of Barker's Mills; Siege of Petersburg; First Battle of Deep Bottom

The 11th New Jersey Infantry Regiment was a regiment of infantry from New Jersey that served in the Union Army during the American Civil War.

== Service ==
The 11th New Jersey Infantry Regiment was recruited in May 1862 at Camp Perrine, located near the New Jersey State Prison near Trenton. The regiment was led by Colonel Robert McAllister, who had seen service as lieutenant colonel in the 1st New Jersey Volunteer Infantry.

The regiment left New Jersey for Washington on August 25. By mid-September the 11th remain in Washington at half strength due to a measles epidemic.

The 11th saw combat at the Battle of Fredericksburg, Virginia in December 1862.

The regiment also saw action at the following battles:

- Battle of Fredericksburg - December 12–13, 1862
- Battle of Chancellorsville - May 3, 1863
- Salem Heights, Virginia - May 3, 1863
- Battle of Chancellorsville - May 4, 1863
- Battle of Gettysburg - July 2–3, 1863
- Beverly Ford, Virginia - August 19, 1863
- Locust Grove, Virginia - November 27, 1863
- Mine Run, Virginia - November 29, 1863
- Battle of Spotsylvania Court House - May 10–12, 1864
- Barker's Mills, Virginia - June 10, 1864
- Petersburg, Virginia - June 16–23 & July 1, 1864

The regiment was mustered out June 6, 1865.

== Commanders ==
- Colonel Robert McAllister
- Lieutenant Colonel Stephen Moore

== Original field & staff officers ==
- Company A - Captain Phillip J. Kearny
- Company B - Captain William H. Meeker
- Company C - Captain John J. Willis
- Company D - Captain Valentine Mutchler or Luther Martin
- Company E - Captain Thomas J. Halsey
- Company F - Captain John H. Grover
- Company G - Captain Theodore Stagg
- Company H - Captain Dorastus B. Logan
- Company I - Captain John T. Hill
- Company K - Captain William B. Dunning

== Casualties ==
- Officers Killed or Mortally Wounded: 11
- Officers Died of Disease, Accidents: 0
- Enlisted Men Killed or Mortally Wounded: 131
- Enlisted Men Died of Disease, Accidents: 107

== See also ==
- List of New Jersey Civil War Units
