= New Jersey in the American Civil War =

The state of New Jersey in the United States provided a source of troops, equipment and leaders for the Union during the American Civil War. Though no major battles were fought in New Jersey, soldiers and volunteers from New Jersey played an important part in the war, including Philip Kearny and George B. McClellan, who led the Army of the Potomac early in the Civil War and unsuccessfully ran for President of the United States in 1864 against his former commander-in-chief, Abraham Lincoln.

== Slavery and prelude to war ==
The Quaker population of New Jersey was especially intolerant of slavery. However, it ended up becoming the last northern state to abolish slavery, enforcing a period of indentured service in advance of full liberation.

New Jersey passed an act for the gradual abolition of slavery in 1804, it was only in 1830 that most blacks were free in the state. However, by the close of the Civil War, about a dozen African-Americans in New Jersey were still apprenticed freedmen. New Jersey at first refused to ratify the Constitutional Amendments that banned slavery. New Jersey was a major part of the extensive Underground Railroad system.

== Civil War ==
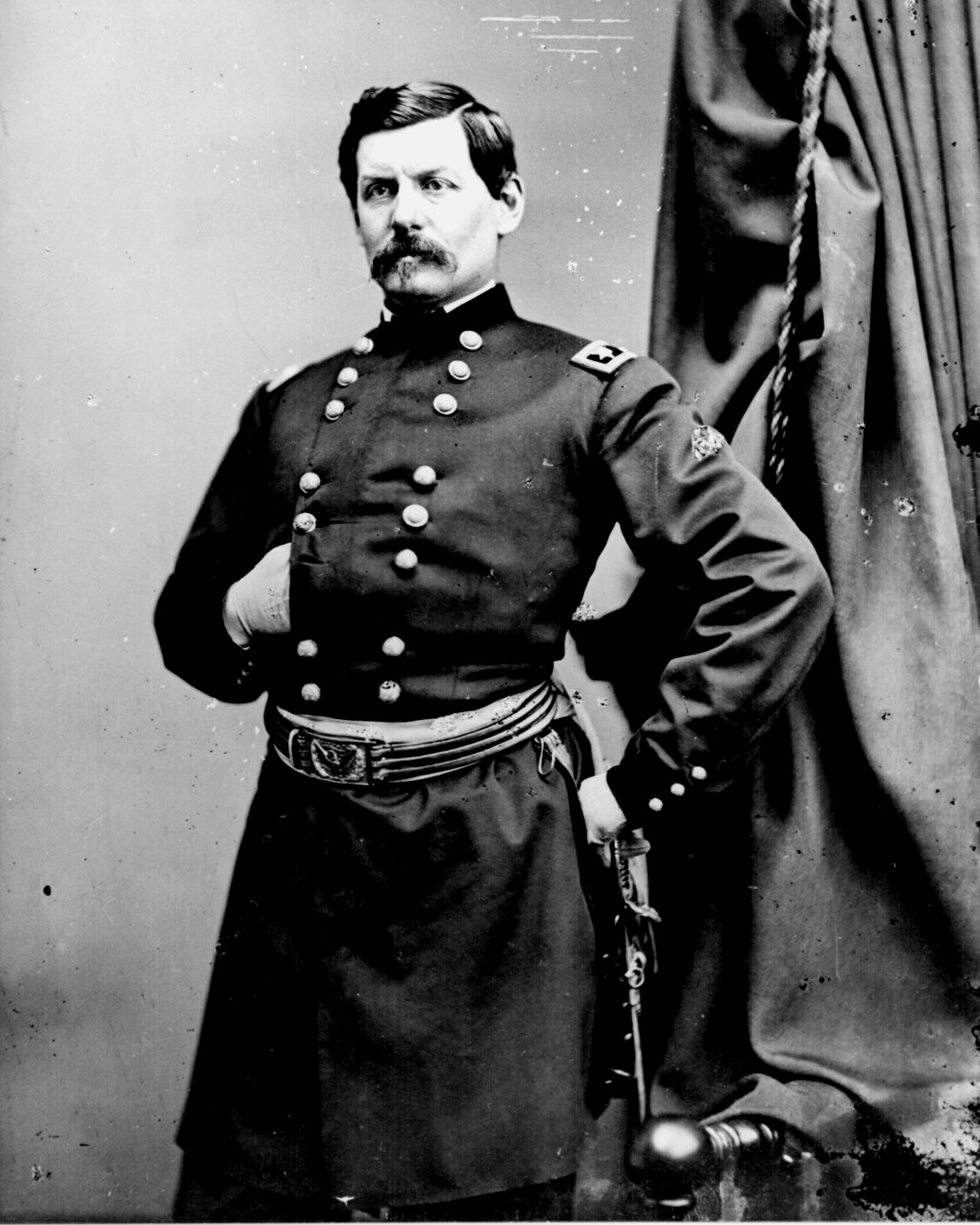
George B. McClellan.

On May 4, 1861, in a response to President Abraham Lincoln's call to arms the U.S. War Department directed New Jersey to fill a quota of three infantry regiments to serve a three-year term of enlistment. Recruitment took place for the new regiments all over the state, and on May 21, the 1st New Jersey Volunteer Infantry was mustered into the Union Army at Camp Olden in Trenton under Maj. Theodore T. S. Laidley of the United States Regular Army. The 9th New Jersey Volunteer Infantry, under Col. Joseph W. Allen at Camp Olden, was the last New Jersey regiment to leave the state in 1861 but the first committed to battle. Additional regiments were raised throughout the war, including cavalry and artillery.

No battles took place within New Jersey throughout the course of the Civil War. However, over 88,000 soldiers from New Jersey were part of several infantry and cavalry regiments. In total, 52 regiments were created by New Jersey soldiers during this war. 23,116 of those soldiers served in the Army of the Potomac. Soldiers from New Jersey fought generally in the Eastern theater of the Civil War. Over 6,000 soldiers from New Jersey lost their lives in the war. Philip Kearny, an officer from the Mexican–American War, led a brigade of New Jersey regiments under Brigadier General William B. Franklin. Kearny distinguished himself as a brilliant officer during the Peninsula Campaign, and was promoted to the rank of major general.

Another notable officer from New Jersey was Major General Gershom Mott, from Trenton. He served as brigade and division commander and temporarily led the II Corps. Major General Hugh Judson Kilpatrick was one of the first officers to be wounded in the war. He infamously fought in the Battle of Gettysburg and served as Sherman's cavalry leader in the Atlanta campaign. After the war he served as ambassador to Chile. Colonel Harvey Brown, of Clark, was a veteran of the regular army. He served to great success in Florida and initially commanded the defences during the New York Draft Riots. Brigadier Generals from New Jersey include George W. Taylor, Charles A. Heckman, Joseph W. Revere, Charles G. Harker and Theodore Runyon.

On 24 March 1863, the New Jersey legislature passed a resolution that included many aspects of the situation caused by the war. Some of the aspects were:

Against proclamations from any source by which, under the plea of "military necessity," persons in states and territories sustaining the federal government, and beyond necessary military lines, are held liable to the rigor and severity of military law

Against all arrests without warrant—against the suspension of the writ of habeas corpus in states and territories sustaining the federal government, "where the public safety does not require it"—and against the assumption of power by any person to suspend such writ, except under the express authority of Congress

Against the power assumed in the proclamation of the President made January one, eighteen hundred and sixty-three, by which all the slaves in certain states and parts of states are forever set free—and against the expenditure of the public moneys for the emancipation of slaves or their support at any time, under any pretence whatever

New Jersey was one of the few states to vote for Stephen Douglas instead of Abraham Lincoln in the 1860 presidential election. The people of New Jersey also gave its electoral votes to George McClellan when he ran for president against Lincoln in the election of 1864, being the only free state that rejected Lincoln twice. McClellan later became the governor of New Jersey, from 1878 to 1881.

Many cities like Paterson and Camden, grew extremely strong through the duration of the Civil War. They produced many necessities, including clothing and war materials like ammunition. These cities prospered through constant production even after the end of the war. Cities like those of Paterson and Camden became crucial to the Northern war effort. With the Union's ability to manufacture more supplies, the Union was able to defeat the Confederates and successfully conclude the war and reunite the country.

== See also ==
- List of New Jersey Civil War units
