= Maria Newell =

English missionary, teacher and translator

Maria Newell Gützlaff (4 August 1794 – 16 February 1831) was an English missionary, teacher and translator.

Maria was born at Stepney, Middlesex, in England, the child of Samuel Newell, tallow chandler, and Mary Duchesne.

Maria studied Chinese under Robert Morrison during his furlough in the 1820s, and was appointed the first female missionary of the London Missionary Society (LMS). The plan was for her to carry on female education among the Chinese immigrants. Before this time sending unmarried female missionaries was absolutely unheard of. She sailed from England on 11 April 1827 (in the company of Maria Dyer) and reached Malacca, Straits Settlements, on 26 August 1827. She was financially supported by Mary Ann Aldersey.

On 26 November 1829 she was married to Karl Gutzlaff, after their marriage she went with her husband to Siam on 11 February 1830. "These two devoted themselves to studying Siamese and translating, hardly allowing themselves time to eat or sleep, and daily employing a number of copyists. Thus they succeeded in evolving a very imperfect translation of the whole Bible in Siamese, a considerable portion of it into the Lao and Cambodian languages, and preparing a dictionary and grammar of the Siamese and Cambodian. These translations were later delivered by Mr. Gutzlaff to Mr. Robinson of the American Board of Commissioners for Foreign Missions and the dictionary was taken over by Mr. Jones of the Baptist Board and became the foundation of the dictionary later prepared by Eliza Grew Jones."

On 16 February 1831 Maria gave birth to twin daughters at Bangkok, Siam. She died a few hours later. One child died at birth, the other was left for a time with her Siamese nurse, later, when it became possible she was put in the care of a Mrs. Thomson in Singapore, she lived about four months.

Maria and the small children were buried by special permit at the upper side of the Portuguese Consulate gate. This plot continued to be the burial ground of the missionaries and others until King Mongkut made a grant for this purpose in 1853, and in 1893 this earliest cemetery which had eventually been bought by the Baptist Mission, was sold and the graves moved to the new Protestant Cemetery.

== Bibliography ==
- Valerie Griffiths, Not Less Than Everything: The Courageous Women Who Carried the Christian Gospel to China, Kregel Publications, 2004.
- Mary Raleigh Anderson, Protestant Mission Schools for Girls in South China, 1827 to the Japanese Invasion, Heiter-Starke Printing Co., 1943.
