= George Dupont =

Man from Siam who took part in the American Civil War

Private George Dupont จอร์จ ดูปองท์
- Born: ยอด (Yod) c. 1844; Rattanakosin Kingdom (Siam)
- Died: July 18, 1900 (aged ~55–56); Kingdom of Siam
- Burial place: Bangkok Protestant Cemetery, Thailand
- Military career
- Allegiance: United States of America; Siam
- Branch: Union Army; Royal Siamese Army
- Service years: 1862–1865
- Units: Company B, 13th New Jersey Volunteer Infantry
- Conflicts: American Civil War: Battle of Antietam; Battle of Chancellorsville; Battle of Gettysburg; Battle of Resaca; Battle of Kolb's Farm; Sherman's March to the Sea

George Dupont (Thai: จอร์จ ดูปองท์), whose Thai name was Yod (ยอด), was a soldier and timber dealer from Siam known for participating in the American Civil War, serving the Union Army. He fought in three major battles of the war: Antietam, Chancellorsville, and Gettysburg. He also took part in Sherman's March to the Sea. After the war, he eventually returned to Siam, where he briefly worked for The Siam Weekly Advertiser, an English-language newspaper. Soon, he was hired by the Siamese Government as a drillmaster for its Army. After leaving his military career, he became a timber dealer, travelling throughout Siam. He was married shortly before his death on July 18, 1900, due to heart disease.

== Life ==
=== Early life and arrival at the United States ===
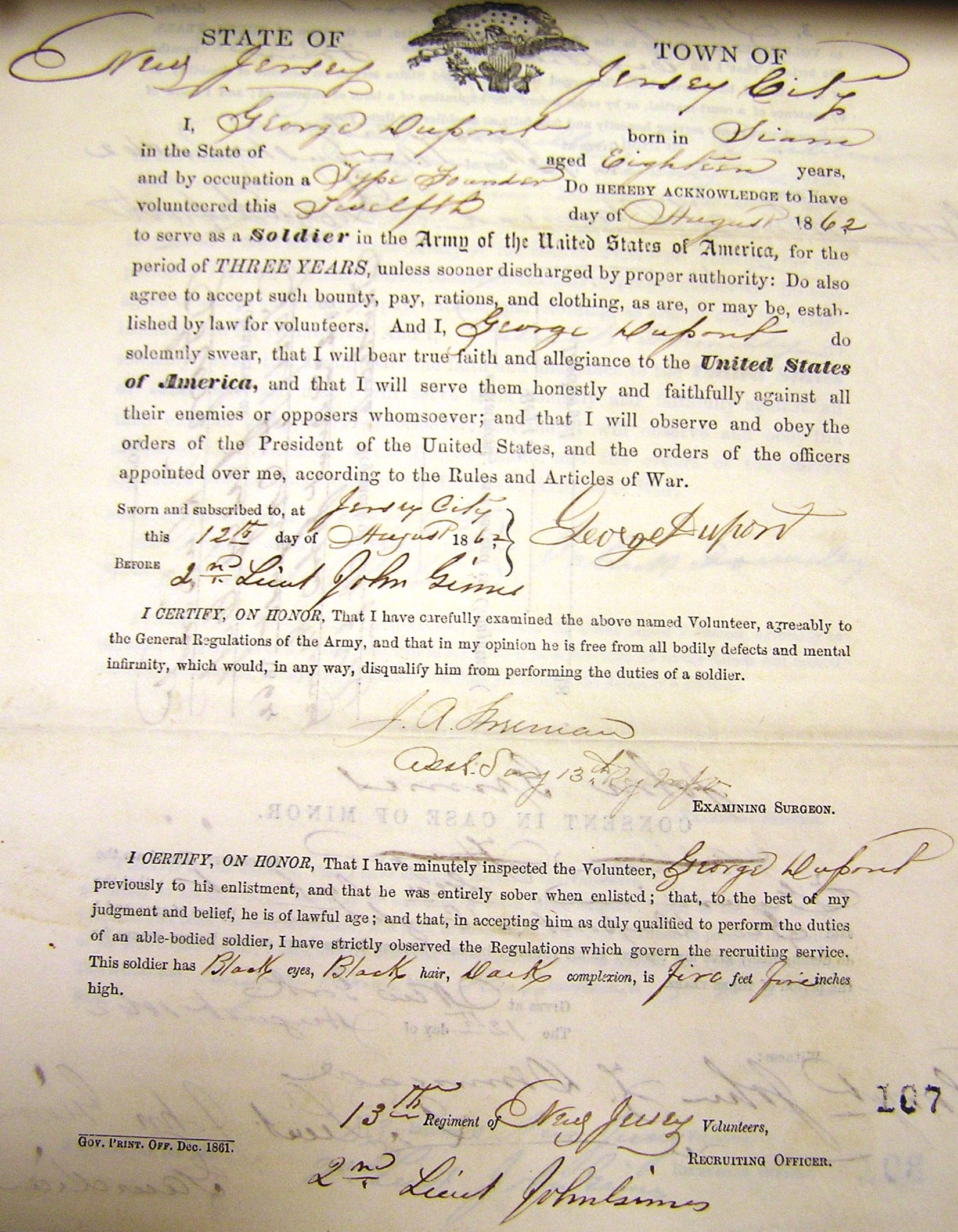
Volunteer document signed by George Dupont, 1862.

George Dupont was born about 1844. Not much is known about Dupont's early life, his family, and how he came to the United States, but documents show that he appears to be educated. He could have possibly been educated by American missionaries before being sent to the United States, or either returning there with them. He arrived at New York in 1859, before settling at Jersey City, New Jersey. When the American Civil War began, Dupont joined Company B of the 13th New Jersey Volunteer Infantry on August 12, 1862. His physical description in his enlistment papers is "5'6" black hair and eyes and a dark complexion."

=== Participation in the Civil War ===
After joining the New Jersey Volunteer Infantry, Dupont fought in major battles throughout the war. He went through the Battle of Antietam, the Battle of Chancellorsville, and the Battle of Gettysburg without any major injuries. However, after the Battle of Gettysburg, he fell ill and was hospitalized near Alexandria, Virginia, during the summer and fall of 1863. He was wounded several times during the war. After his recovery, he became slightly wounded after taking part in the Battle of Resaca, but did not require any hospitalization. A month later, he was wounded again, this time severely, after engaging in the Battle of Kolb's Farm. He recovered from the wound in 1865, after the war came to its end.

=== After the Civil War ===
Dupont was discharged at Louisville, Kentucky. After leaving the army, he received a government bounty worth 75 Dollars, and a back pay worth 64.30 Dollars. It is unknown whether he returned to Jersey City or not, but he eventually ended up at Philadelphia, where he worked as a clerk for a type foundry on Sansom Street. On August 2, 1869, Dupont became a United States citizen and was granted a passport. He soon left the United States, visiting Japan and China before arriving at Bangkok in 1870. It is unknown why Dupont returned to Siam, an amateur historian speculated that he may have returned because he was satisfied with King Chulalongkorn's reforms. However, this is likely false, since major reforms did not happen until the 1880s.

After returning to Siam, Dupont worked for a newspaper called The Siam Weekly Advertiser. However, his career at the newspaper was cut short when the Siamese Government hired him as a drillmaster for the Army, acknowledging him as a “young man well up in military affairs”. He was hired as a foreign instructor, earning him 50 Dollars a month, a very high wage for a commoner at the time.

Dupont left his military career and became a timber dealer, travelling by boat throughout the kingdom's rivers. In November 1889, he was attacked by thieves while resting on his boat at Mueng Sawankhalok. He ended up being shot through both of his feet, leading to an American newspaper calling the incident "an outrage upon…an American citizen, residing in Bangkok, Siam committed on his person by subjects of the King of Siam." He applied for a military pension in 1891 after the injuries rendered him unable to work. He later received a 12 dollars per month pension as a United States citizen, even though his injuries were not war-related.

Dupont was married in early 1900. However, he soon died of heart disease on July 18 of the same year. He is buried at grave 720, Block C, at the Bangkok Protestant Cemetery.
