= Cremation volume =

Genre of Thai literature

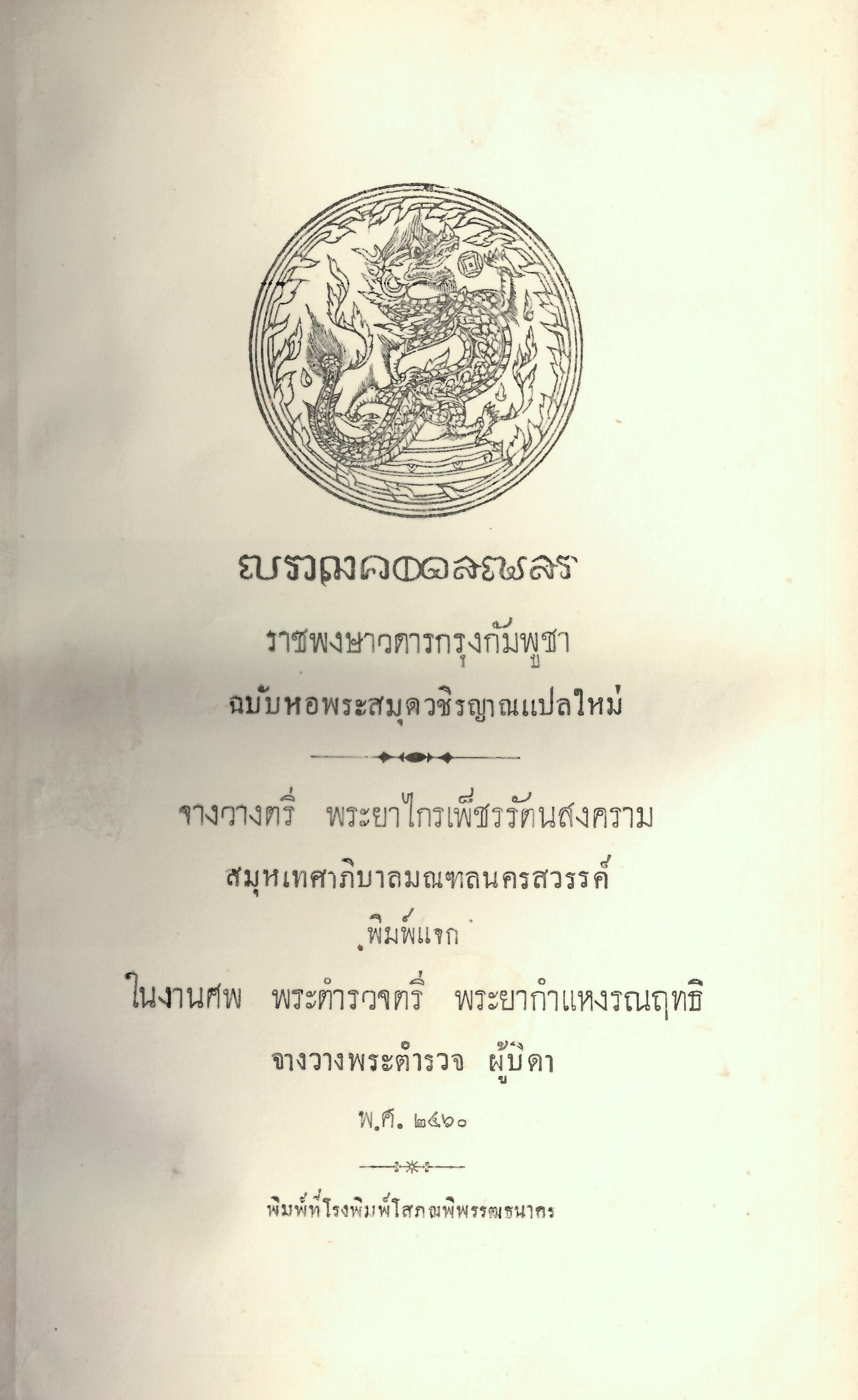
Cover page of a 1917 cremation volume containing a translation of the Cambodian Royal Chronicles

Cremation volumes (or funeral books, etc.) are a genre of printed literature found in Thailand. They are commemorative books given as gifts to guests at Thai funerals, and usually include a biography of the deceased as well as other literary material. Their publication, which dates to the late nineteenth century, was initiated among royalty and nobility, then taken up by wealthy commoners and, later, the wider middle class. These books, whose contents range from compilations of religious texts and historical manuscripts to essays and writings on general knowledge in various fields, are regarded as a valuable historical source by Thai studies scholars, and are actively collected and traded.

== History ==
The exact origins of the tradition of giving books as commemorative gifts are unclear, though it probably derived from the practice of distributing gifts at celebratory events (such as major birthday anniversaries) as well as funerals. Some scholars have traced the practice to the earlier commissioning of handwritten volumes in samut khoi folding book format. These would contain a selection of Buddhist texts in Pali language, often extracts from the seven books of the Abhidhamma, which were sometimes combined with the Thai version of Phra Malai. A colophon would often include information on the occasion, the sponsor of the manuscript, and for which purpose it was produced. These manuscripts have been tentatively dated to as early 1807, though this claim of a written tradition has been disputed.

The earliest known printed cremation volume is generally regarded to be that published for the royal cremation ceremony of Queen Sunanda Kumariratana (a consort of King Chulalongkorn) and her daughter in 1881: a selection of Buddhist verses and chants, of which 10,000 copies were printed. A possible earlier example, sets of the epic Phra Aphai Mani printed by Samuel J. Smith for the royal cremation of King Mongkut in 1869, was discovered in 2006, though it has yet to receive further in-depth study. Printing had been introduced to Thailand by American missionaries in 1835, and quickly gained popularity from the 1860s. The increased accessibility of the press and the medium led to a gradual proliferation of commemorative books, especially cremation volumes, which were seen as more lasting in value than the usual trinket gifts, and were commissioned by noble and well-to-do families following the royal example.

A significant trend beginning in the 1900s was collaboration with royal libraries, who provided material for publication which previously existed only as manuscripts. Through the process, the cremation volumes brought these manuscript documents into print and helped build the libraries' book collections, in effect allowing the families to make merit on behalf of the deceased by contributing to the libraries' mission of spreading knowledge. The earliest volume printed in this tradition is a book of chants dedicated to Chaokhun Chommanda Samli, one of Mongkut's consorts, in 1901. Many that followed were printed through arrangements with the Vajirañāṇa Library (the precursor of the National Library), which committed to assuring the quality of printings and received a portion of the books from each printing as contributions to its funding.

Towards the mid-twentieth century, the publication of cremation volumes increased along with the expanding middle class, especially merchant families of Chinese origin. The format of the books began to diversify, and so did the nature of their content, which more often became directly dedicated to the deceased. By the turn of the century, the practice of printing books for funerals had begun to decline, and again became more limited to the wealthy. In some cases, books have been enhanced or supplanted by digital multimedia such as DVDs.

== Contents ==
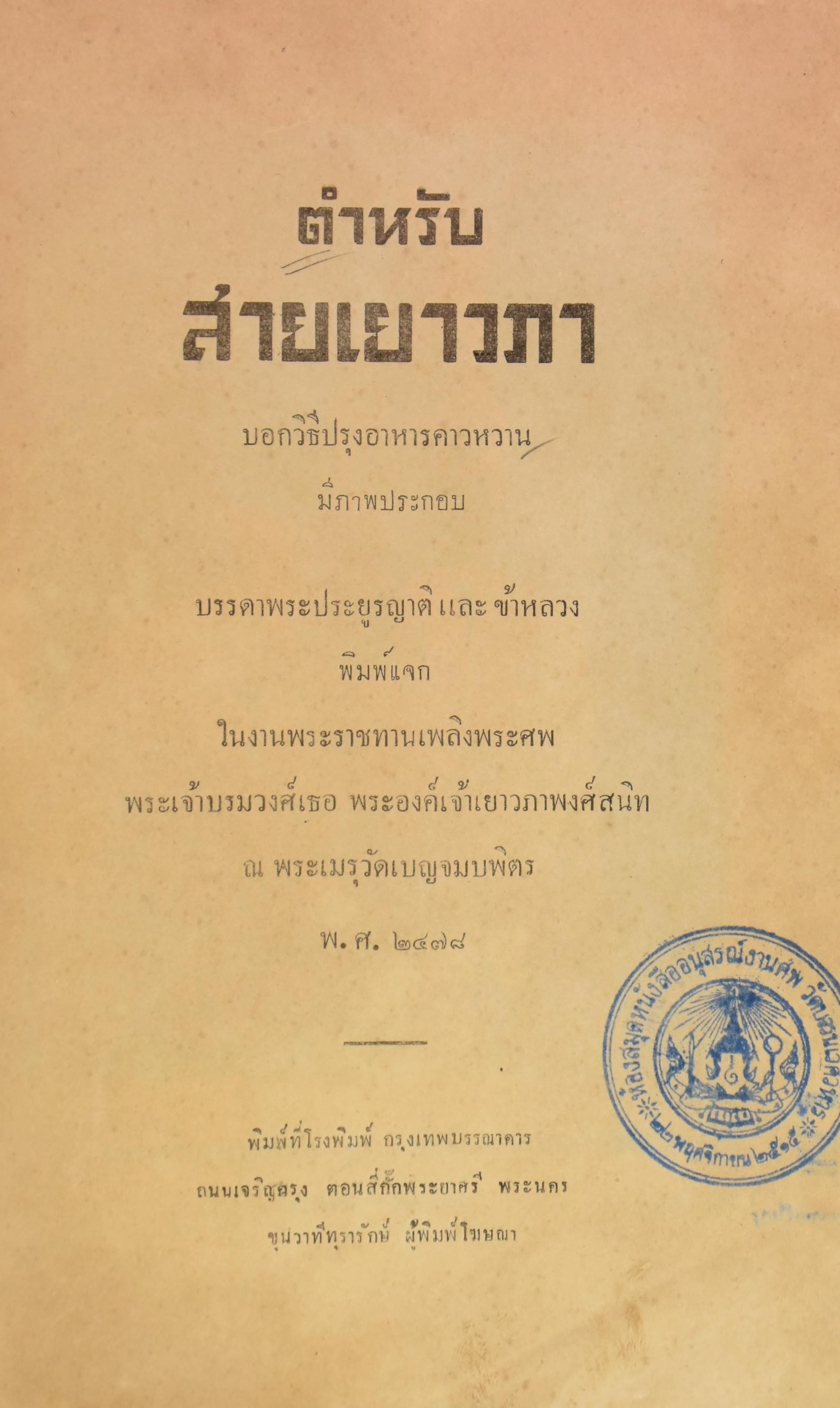
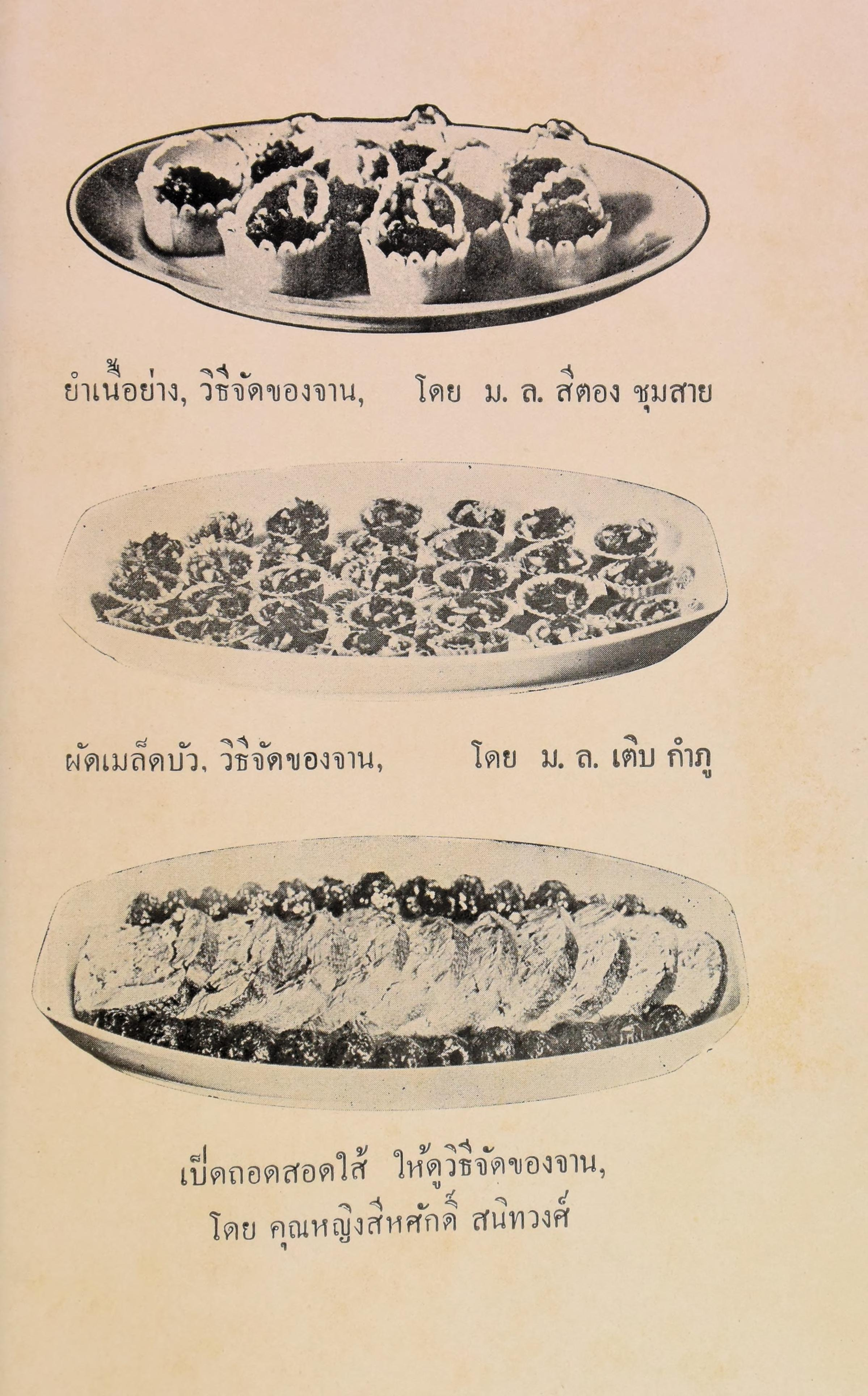
Title page and photographic insert from Tamrap Sai Yaowapha, a recipe book printed as the cremation volume of Princess Yaovabha Bongsanid in 1935

Cremation volumes mainly consist of two parts: a commemoration of the deceased, and content chosen for publication, which may or may not be directly relevant to the person's life. Most early volumes consisted only of the selected work, and commemorated the deceased only through a mention of the occasion of the printing on the title page. Later ones would come to include biographies (or autobiographies) of the deceased as well as eulogies by family and friends. The appearance and quality of printing of cremation volumes vary widely, and mostly reflect the social and financial status of the family producing the work. Some may be ornately designed and printed in colour, while others may be simple pamphlets of Buddhist proverbs with a cover bearing the name of the deceased.

The included works initially featured Buddhist texts. In 1904, Chulalongkorn suggested that a broader range of topics of more interest to people be printed. As more cremation books were published through arrangements with royal libraries during the following decades, the libraries became more involved in suggesting titles for publication. Prince Damrong Rajanubhab, who headed the Vajirañāṇa Library, was especially influential, compiling and editing essays and stories for the purpose, including the Prachum Phongsawadan, an extensive series of topical histories covering areas such as gambling in Thailand, Thai theatre, Thai orchestras and Thai warships. Topics touched ranged from art, music, literature, linguistics and poetry, to Thai traditions and customs, ranks and titles of the nobility, and writings and travels of kings. Nevertheless, up until the 1950s, the subject matter of most cremation volumes did not stray far from the realms of religion, history and archaeology.

As the printing of cremation volumes became a more private affair, their coverage evolved. Some featured selected writings of the deceased themselves, while others may have reprinted works of their favourite authors. Many covered topics directly related to the lives and work of the deceased, while historical biographies, travel, language and cooking were also popular subjects. Health and medical knowledge, especially covering their particular causes of death, gained popularity in the 1970s, though religious writings continued to be the most popular subject featured in most cremation volumes.

== Collection and research ==
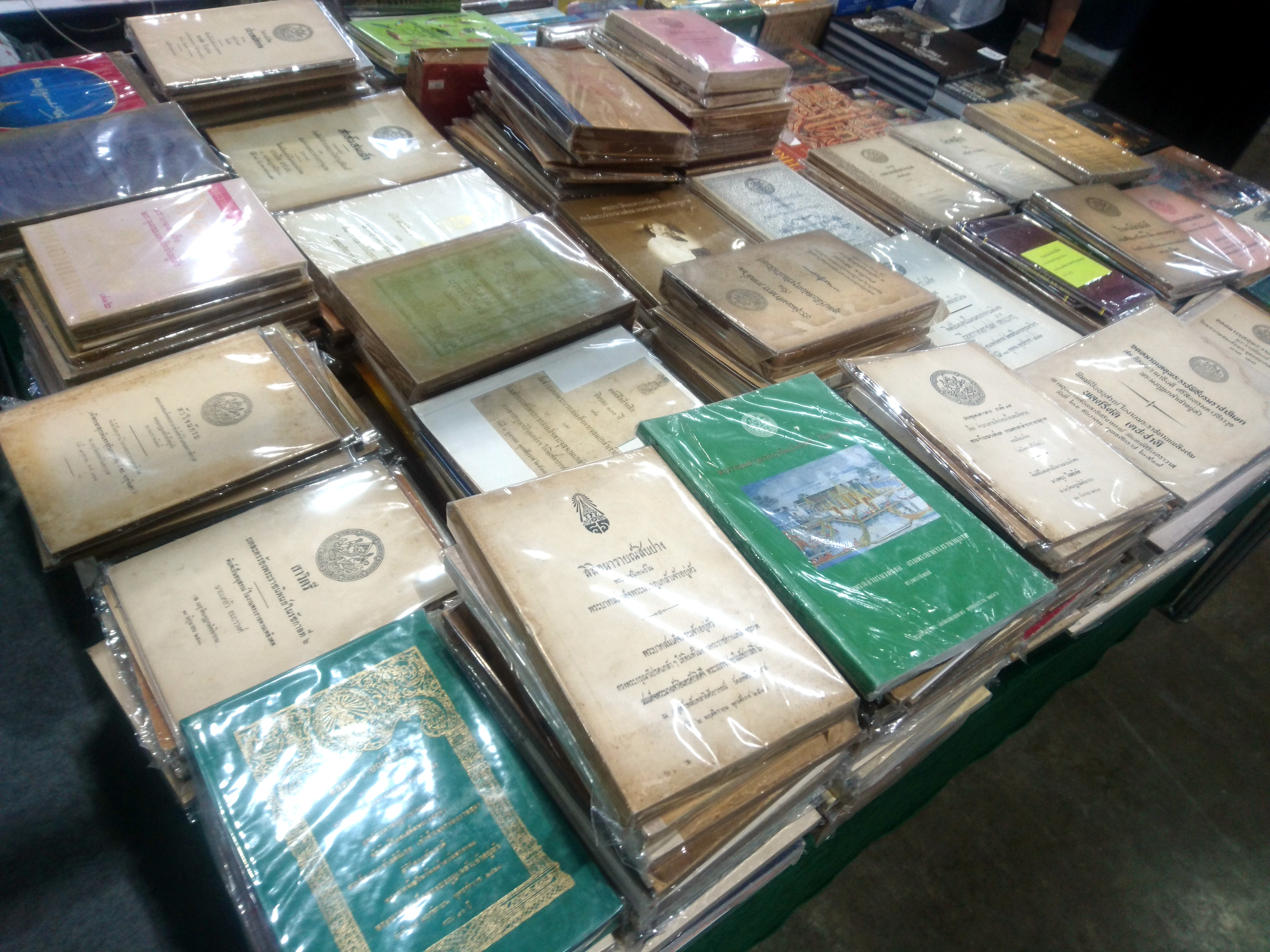
Cremation volumes on sale at a rare bookseller's booth at Book Expo Thailand 2020

Cremation volumes are valued by historians and researchers as a source of information, both for the historical works they feature and the biographical content covering the deceased, which often contain anecdotal first-hand information and can provide reflections on the underlying social structures of the period. They are also of interest to non-academics; a particular area concerns cookbooks, which have been collected by well-known chefs of Thai cuisine. David Thompson, Bo Songvisava and Bongkoch Satongun have based their menus on the books' recipes.

As the books are self-published and do not enter the regular market, instead being immediately given out and dispersed, their acquisition can be difficult. Extensive collector's circles are dedicated to them, and an active market has developed around their trade, which takes place primarily through sellers of rare and used books. Most books reach this second-hand market when families dispose of their old collections. Dealers are also known to hire people to attend funerals specifically to obtain them.

Several foreign libraries have made efforts to acquire cremation volumes, and major collections are held by the National Library of Australia, the University of Michigan Library, the University of California, Riverside Library, and Kyoto University, the last of whose Charas Collection includes over 4,000 volumes, the largest outside Thailand. In Thailand, many libraries hold cremation volumes in their rare book collections, and a central dedicated repository was established in 1972 at the library of Wat Bowonniwet Vihara, following an initiative by columnist Nares Naropakorn. It now has over 24,000 items in its collection. Since 2015, the Thammasat University Library has been digitizing the collection, and over 6,400 items (as of 2019) have been made available electronically through the library's website and the Internet Archive.
