= Death horoscopes in Tibetan Buddhism =

Tibetan death astrology and rituals

The use of death horoscopes in Tibetan Buddhism is an old practice that still sees application today. There are several types of horoscopes used in this religion, including a birth horoscope, a life forecast, an annual horoscope, a marriage horoscope, and a death horoscope. When casting the death horoscope, Tibetan Buddhists place great importance on the corpse, especially within the first three days following its death. There are several purposes for a death horoscope, and carrying out this practice must be done carefully. Additionally, a death horoscope is intended as a loving act for the dead, and a precautionary measure for the family of the deceased. Many Tibetans believe that when a death occurs within the family, other family members' lives are jeopardized, so this practice may be considered essential to both the living and dead. Tibetan Buddhists also believe that their deceased loved ones may spend a short period in hell to pay for sins in their past life.

== Purpose ==
Death horoscopes serve several purposes, including, determining the right time for disposing of the deceased's body, understanding the presumed rebirth destination, and revealing how the deceased's family can improve their rebirth. Additionally, the horoscope may reveal the past life of the dead and whether or not the death was well-timed. The horoscope also serves as a precautionary tool to reveal specific types of threats from demons and future attacks targeted at living family members. In fact, the lama conducts a preventative ceremony before the astrologer casts the death horoscope to prevent any of the eight classes of demonic spirits from harming the deceased. According to some, the chanting of mantras may combat the demons and ward off evil spirits, as well as help interpret the death chart. The death chart indicates who can have contact with the body, and whether certain household items must be removed. Lastly, the astrologer may be able to reveal who will facilitate the corpse's disposal, including carrying, preparing, and cremating it.

== Procedure ==
The initial step in casting the death horoscope includes immediately informing all family and close friends of the death. The corpse is not to be touched or shifted from its position at the moment of death, and the family must wait for the lama or astrologer to arrive. The mourning families may offer a present or fee to the astrologer for the horoscope, to ensure a favorable outcome for the soul. The corpse remains inside the house until the astrologer concludes his calculation. Once the lama arrives, he may perform a religious ritual, known as a phowa (from Sanskrit), which is then followed by the astrologer casting the death horoscope. The lama removes all mourning family members from the death chamber, and closes all windows and doors. He then covers the corpse's face with a white cloth, and sits down next to its head.

He is said to draw the remaining consciousness from the corpse through the top of the head. Then, he extracts some hairs from the corpse's head to allow the soul to exit the body through the roots. He, or the astrologer, indicates whether there is any life remaining in the corpse. According to some, the corpse's consciousness may linger from one life to another for 49 days. So, the lama reads the Tibetan book of the dead, Bardo Thodol, out loud to guide the corpse in its new life. It is important that the body remains undisturbed while the lama guides the spirit because any disruption could cause the soul to drift in an unnatural direction and be seized by a demon.

Other monks may arrive as well, to provide blessings in preparation for the death horoscope. Offering-rites, at this time, are performed as a precautionary measure to ward off demons. The astrologer may then create a grid on the floor or on a sheet of paper, using only rice flour and black pebbles. He constructs the grid and the placement of the materials based on the instruction given in his astrological text. He then reads some of the texts from the astrological manual or a calendar. To calculate the death horoscope, the astrologer considers the time, date, year, and month of the death, and the constellation and phase of the moon. The birth year of the deceased, however, is typically considered the most important factor, because it indicates the deceased's birth animal and trigram. Additionally, the body's position at the final moment of death is essential for the direction the body should be removed and disposed of. The horoscope may also reveal the deceased's last thoughts, and if the thoughts were negative or positive. In the event that they were negative, the family may be given the chance to create and transfer good karma to the deceased's future life. Additionally, the horoscope specifies which actions by the family, will help the deceased in their rebirthed life.
