= 13th New Jersey Infantry Regiment =

- Flag of New Jersey
- Active: 1862–1865
- Country: United States of America
- Allegiance: United States of America; Union
- Branch: Union Army
- Type: Infantry
- Engagements: Antietam, Chancellorsville, Gettysburg, Atlanta campaign, Battle of Peachtree Creek, March to the Sea and Bentonville

The 13th New Jersey Infantry Regiment was a Union Army regiment from New Jersey that fought in the American Civil War.

== American Civil War ==
Recruited in July 1862 essentially from New Jersey's Essex, Hudson and Passaic Counties (with large numbers from the cities of Jersey City and Newark), the 13th New Jersey Infantry Regiment was one of five three-year enlistment units raised by the state that summer. It was mustered into Federal service on August 25, 1862, and was assigned to the Army of the Potomac's XII Corps.

Despite being in existence for less than a month, and with bare rudimentary military training, it was thrown into a combat role at the September 17, 1862, Battle of Antietam. There it fought near the Dunkard Church and performed relatively well considering the unit's inexperience. Its further service would see the regiment take part in the Battles of Chancellorsville, Gettysburg, the Atlanta campaign (most notably at the Battle of Peachtree Creek), the March to the Sea, and Bentonville. It was mustered out of service on June 8, 1865, at Washington, D.C.

Some of the more notable members of the 13th New Jersey were:

- Ezra A. Carman - Colonel and first commander of the regiment. Received a brevet of Brigadier General, US Volunteers for his service. Later served on the Antietam Battlefield Board (1894 to 1898), becoming the leading authority on the battle during his time. Served as Chairman of the Chickamauga and Chattanooga National Military Park Commission in 1905. Author of The Maryland Campaign of September 1862.
- Franklin Murphy - 1st Lieutenant of Company A. Later served as 31st Governor of New Jersey.
- Samuel Toombs - Sergeant, Company F. Author of the 1878 regimental history of his unit, titled "Reminisces of the War: Comprising a Detailed Account of the Experiences of the Thirteenth Regiment New Jersey Volunteers in Camp, on the March and in Battle". Later published the work "New Jersey Troops in the Gettysburg Campaign" in 1888.
- Joseph E. Crowell- Private Company K and Lt. Veteran Reserve Corps wrote "The Young Volunteer - The Everyday Experiences of a Soldier Boy in the Civil War" published in 1906. His book takes you from the muster of the regiment through his commission after being wounded at Chancellorsville.
- Sebastian C. Duncan - Lieutenant, Company E. Author of the "Duncan Papers" of the New Jersey Historical Society. Detailed the experiences of a civil war soldier through letters to his family.
- George Dupont, Thai-American soldier who fought for Company B, 13th New Jersey. Became a naturalized American citizen after the war and went back to Thailand to serve as a drill master of the then recently created Royal Siamese Army. Died of heart disease in 1900 and was buried in the Bangkok Protestant Cemetery in Bangkok, Thailand.

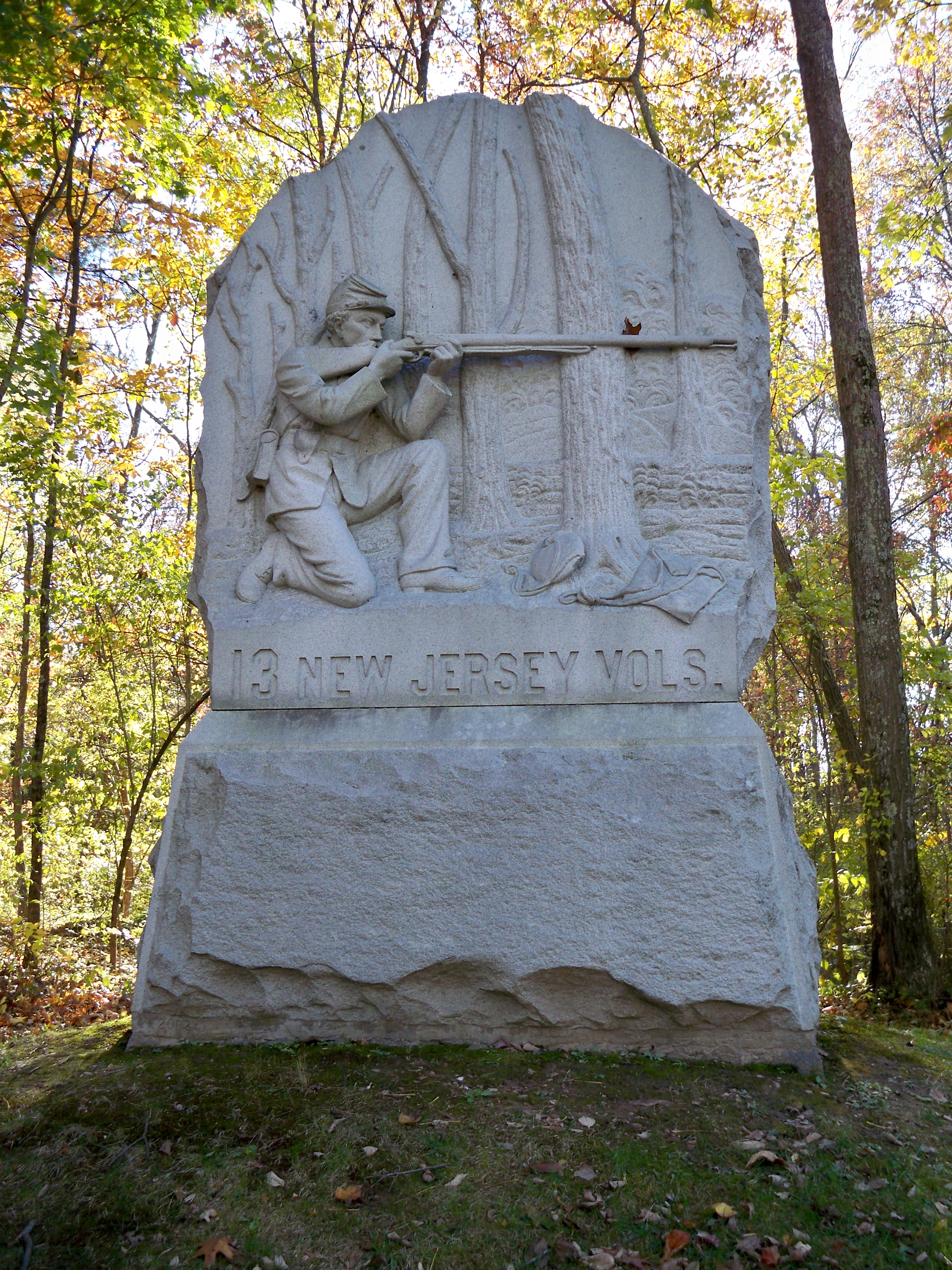
A monument to the 13th New Jersey at Gettysburg National Military Park

Three small monuments were erected in the Antietam National Battlefield to mark the positions the 13th New Jersey held during the battle. A large monument to the unit was erected on Carman Avenue, McAllister Woods in the Gettysburg National Military Park.
