= Phongyibyan =

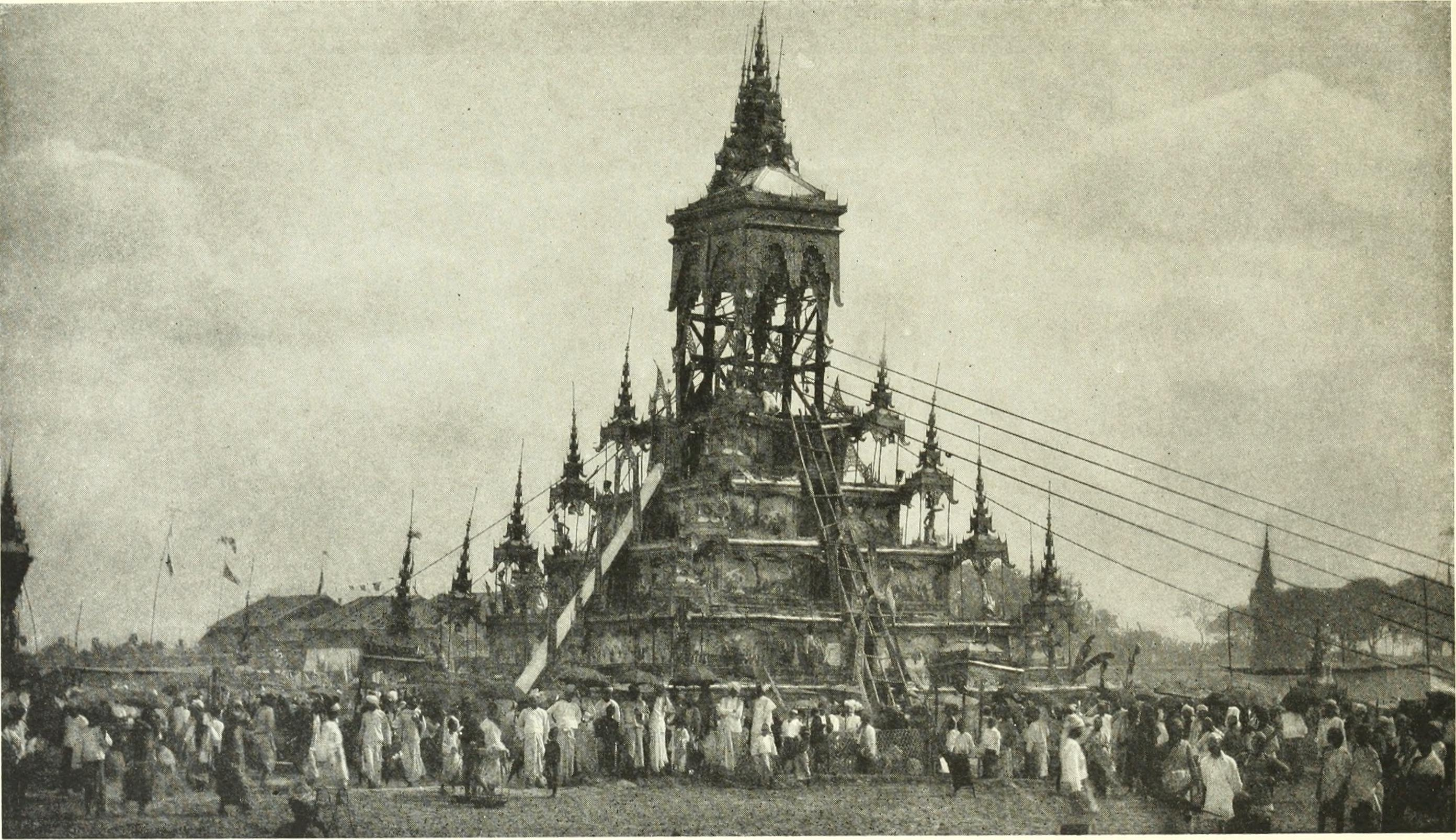
Funerary pyre of a Buddhist monk in the early twentieth century

Phongyibyan (Burmese: ဘုန်းကြီးပျံ; also spelt pongyibyan or phongyibyan pwe) is a Burmese language term for the ceremonial cremation of high-ranking Buddhist monks, in particular monks from Myanmar's largest Buddhist order, the Thudhamma Nikaya.

== Regional observances ==
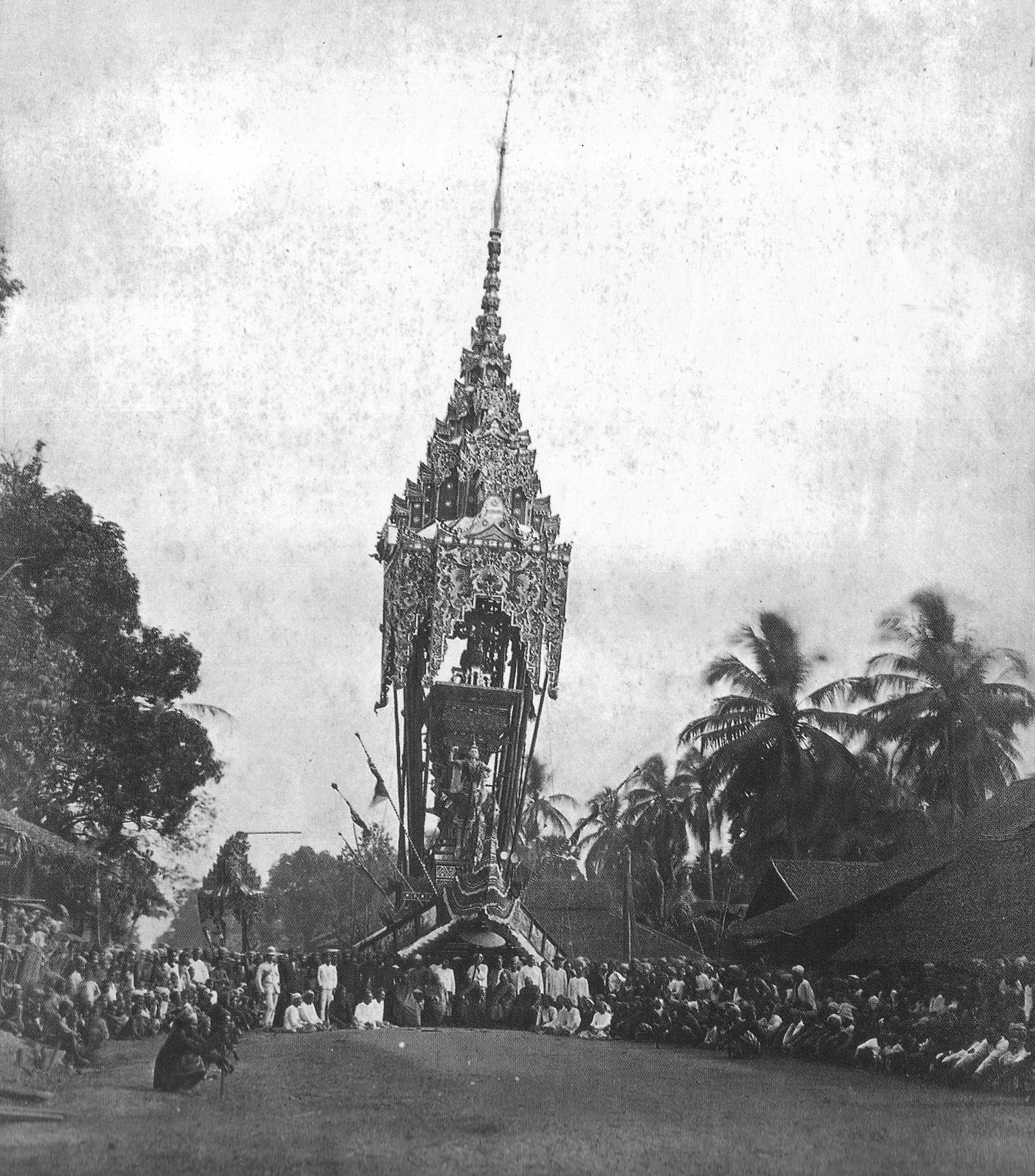
A Burmese ceremonial hearse featuring the hintha bird.

Phongyibyan is widely observed by Buddhists throughout Myanmar, including the Bamar, Mon, Rakhine, and Shan peoples. Similarly elaborate cremation ceremonies, congruous with those in Myanmar, are also held by the Northern Thai people. Among the Shan and Lanna peoples, the ceremony is known as poy law (ပွႆးလေႃ or ปอยล้อ), which literally means "ceremony of the cart," whereby poy is a Burmese loanword meaning "festival" or "ceremony" (cf. Poy Sang Long).

== Timing ==
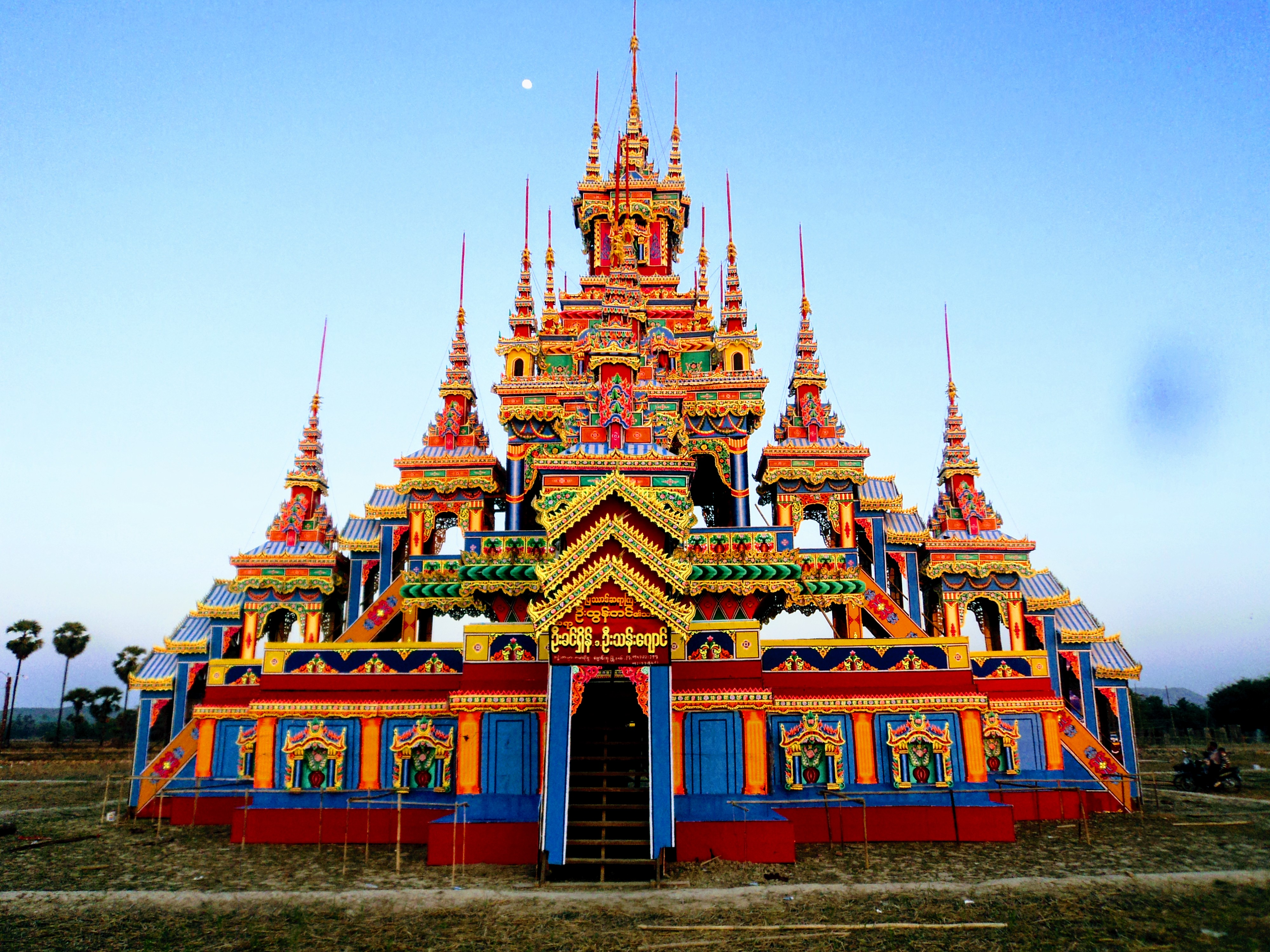
A temporary prāsāda erected for a notable monk in Pa-auk, Mon State

The ceremonial cremation does not necessarily occur immediately after a monk's death. In Northern Thailand, they are typically held between December and March; and in Myanmar, these ceremonies are not held during the Vassa (Buddhist lent). The ceremony typically lasts between 3 and 7 days, depending on the ability of worshippers to organize and finance the ceremonies.

== Ceremonial rituals ==
Some rites have parallels to accounts of the Buddha's own funeral found in the Mahaparinibbana Sutta. An elaborate set of ceremonies, including staged plays, ritual performances, and construction of temporary pyre structures, constitute the cremation. Immediately after the monk's death, the body is embalmed. After the cremation, the remains are collected and housed in a reliquary.

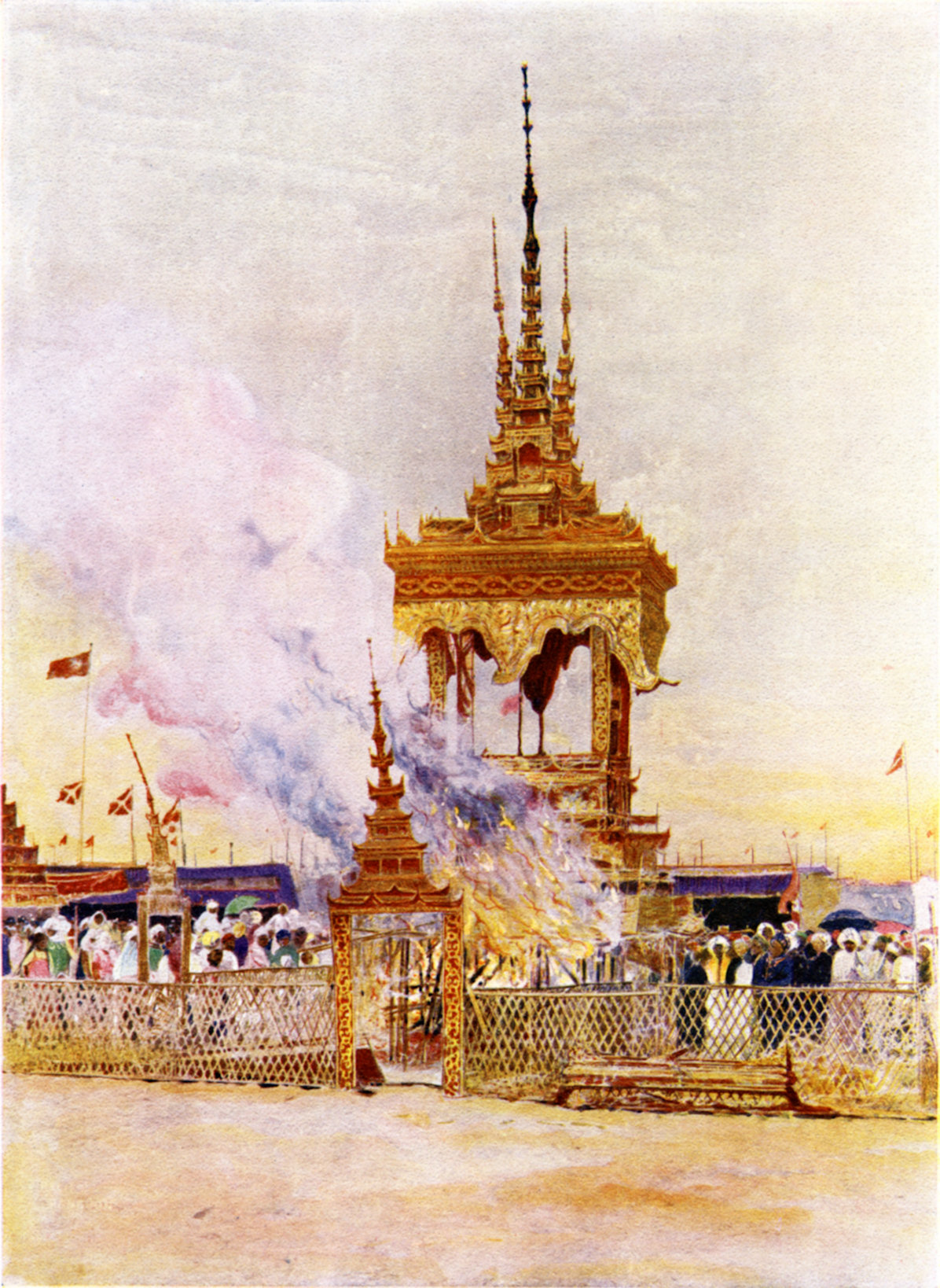
The funerary pyre tower or laungdaik.

A temporary mortuary chapel called neibban kyaung (နိဗ္ဗာန်ကျောင်း), with a multi-tiered pyatthat roof, is constructed to house the coffin. The monk may lie in state for several months, while donations are gathered to fund the cremation ceremonies. A massive funerary pyre tower called laungdaik (လောင်တိုက်), representing Mount Meru, along with numerous subsidiary towers, is also constructed by specialist bamboo artisans called sat-hsaya (စပ်ဆရာ).

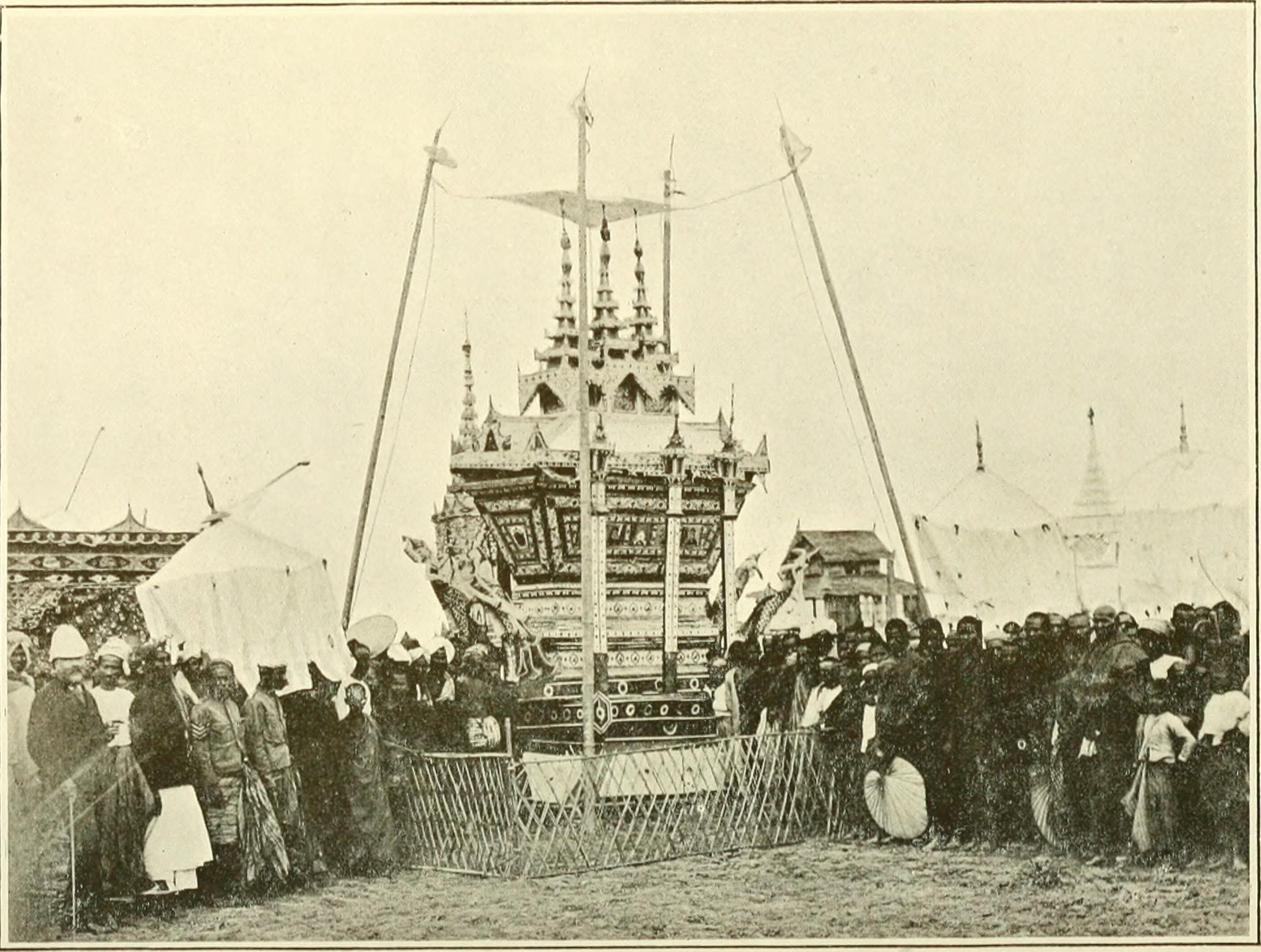
Crematory hearse in Yangon

Ceremonial crematory hearses are often constructed for the cremation, often featuring mythical animals. These hearses or floats are used to transport the coffin to the funerary pyre. The Burmese use hearses featuring hamsa. While the Shan construct hearses featuring the karaweik (a mythical bird), their Northern Thai counterparts build hearses featuring the nok hatsadiling (นกหัสดีลิงค์), a mythical elephant-headed bird. The pyre is often ignited using rockets or fireworks.

Another important ritual during the phongyibyan is a tug-of-war of the funerary pyres, called lun hswe (လွန်ဆွဲ) in Burmese, and lak prasat (ลากปราสาท, lit. "pulling of the prasat") in Thai. This tug-of-war is believed to generate merit. The Rakhine people perform the tala aka (တလားအက) during the cremation ceremony, whereby around two dozen men carry the bedecked coffin using a bamboo frame, while dancing in unison to the tune of a Burmese hsaing waing orchestra.

A staged play called eiyin (ဧယင်), which reflects the pain of the living mourning the departed and combines the Buddhist concept of rebirth and the monk's virtues and life, is performed from the moment the coffin leaves the monastery to the time of cremation. These performances are held during the daytime, generally held in temporary gilt pavilions called san kyaung (စံကျောင်း), which are erected in the monastery grounds or the village squares. Controversy has surrounded the expenses involved in financing such expensive ceremonies.

== Gallery ==
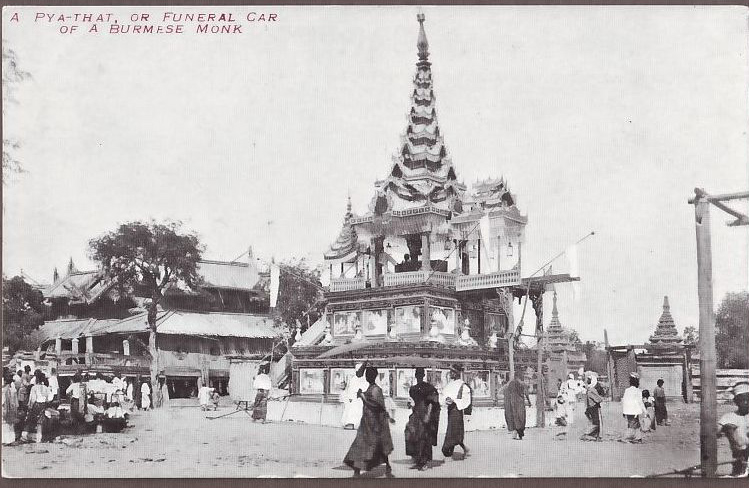

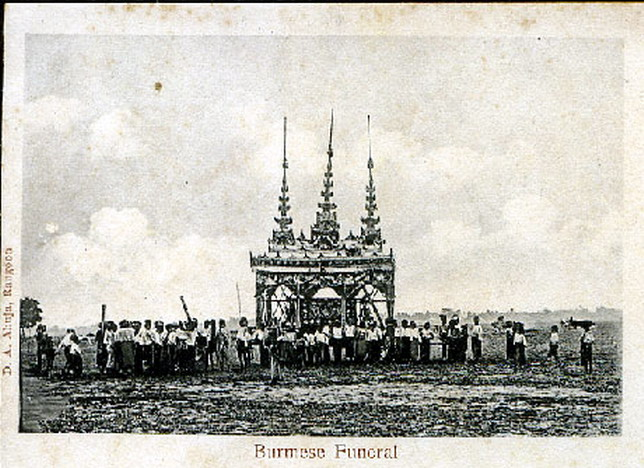

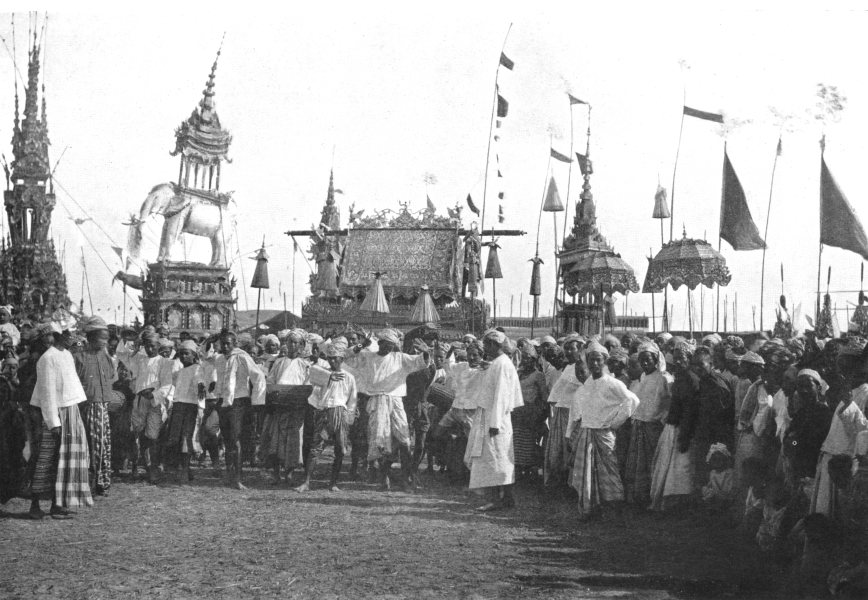

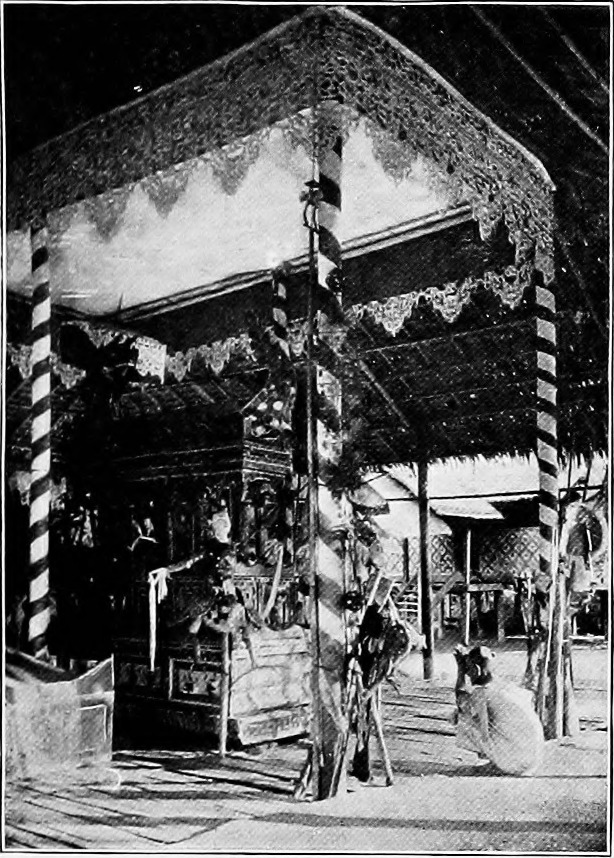

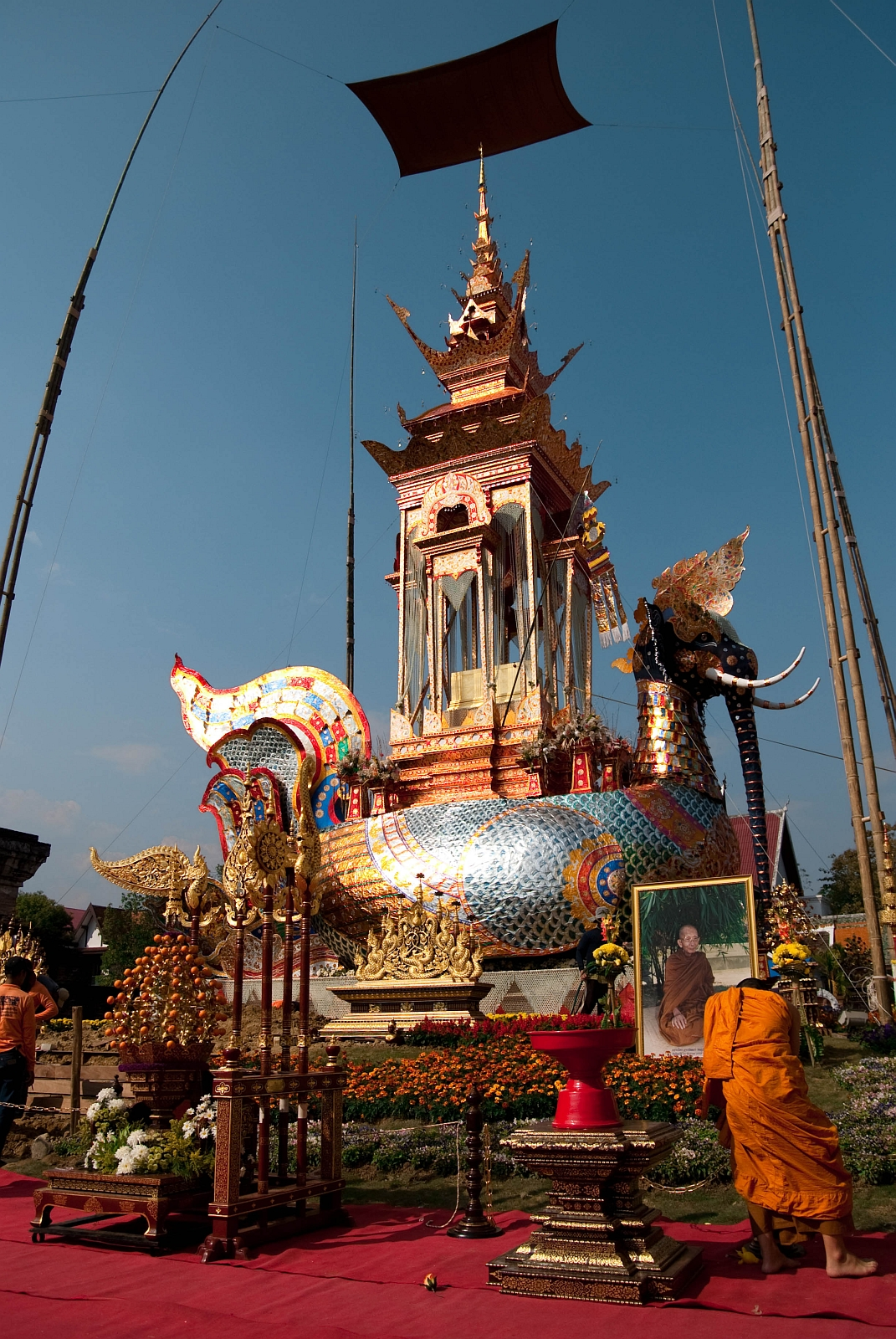

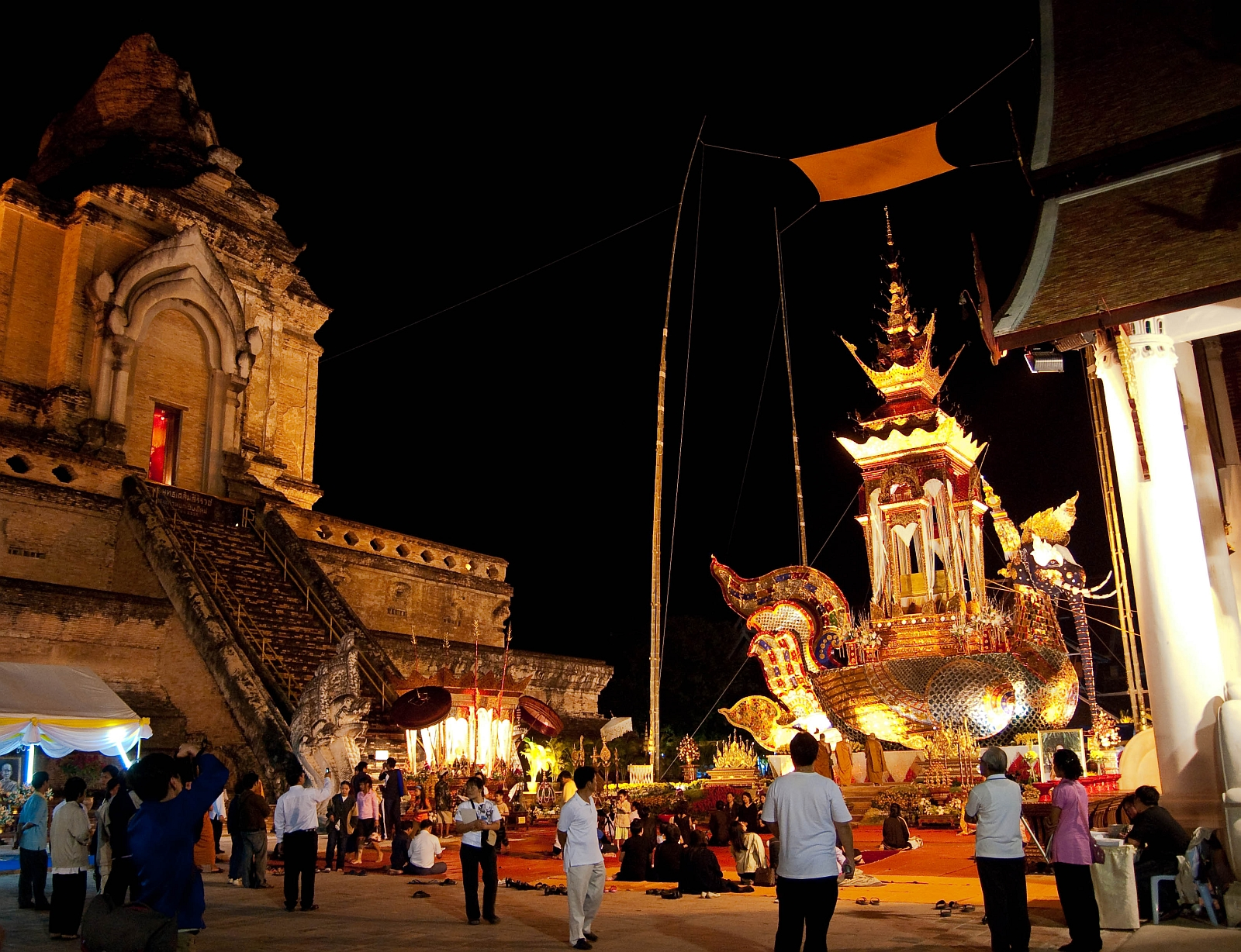

== See also ==
- Buddhism in Burma
- Buddhist funeral
