= Thai funeral =

Summary of Thai funerary rites

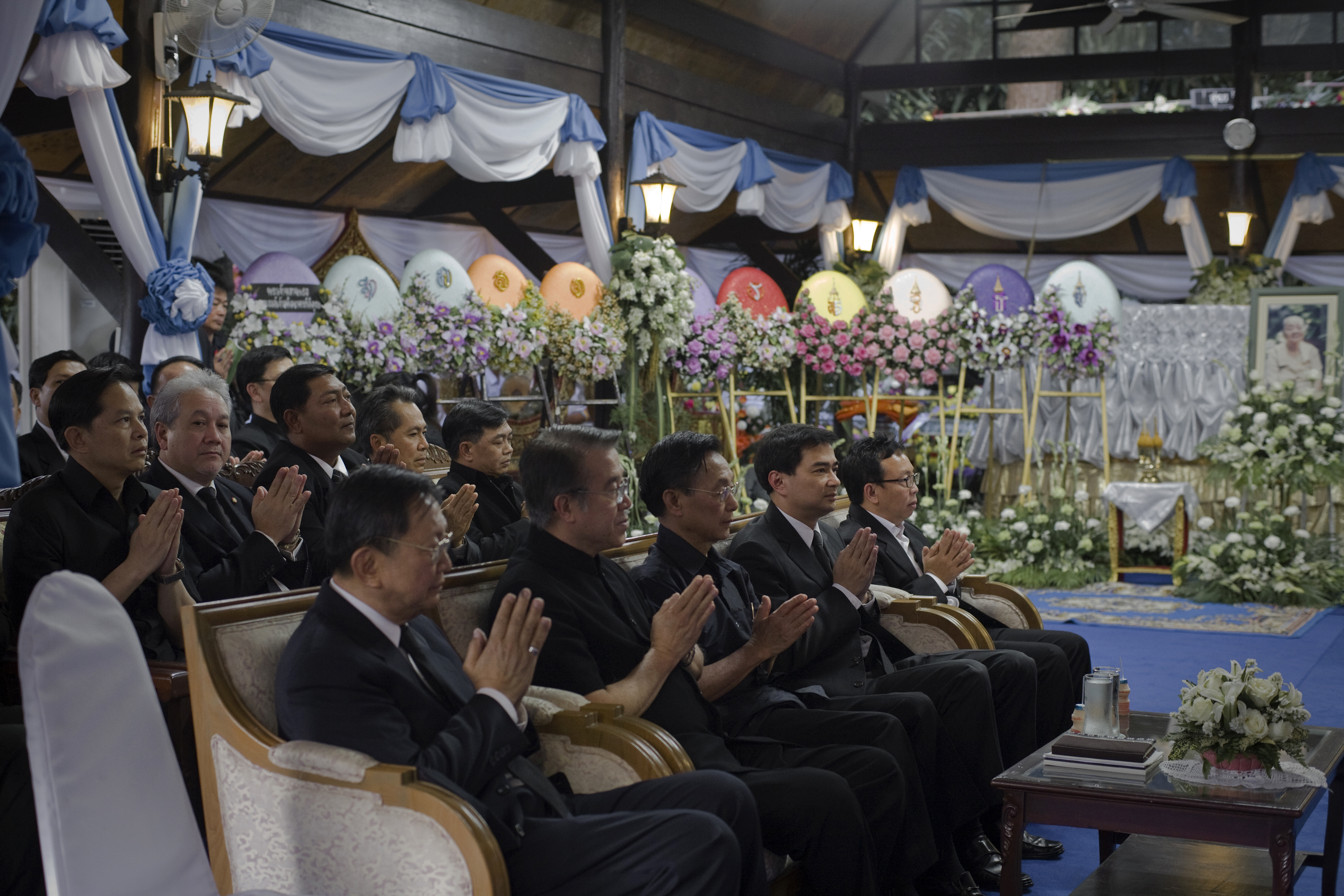
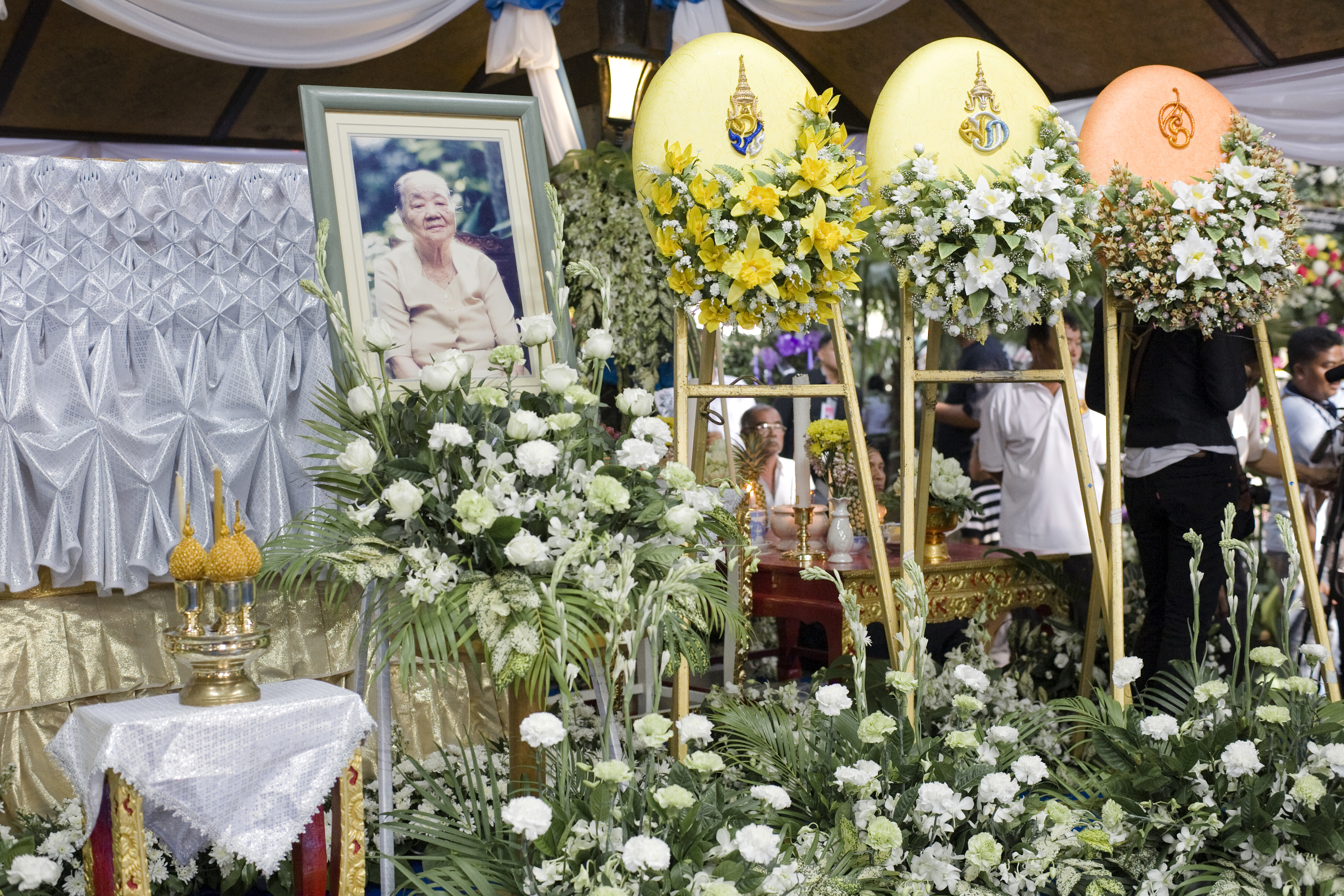
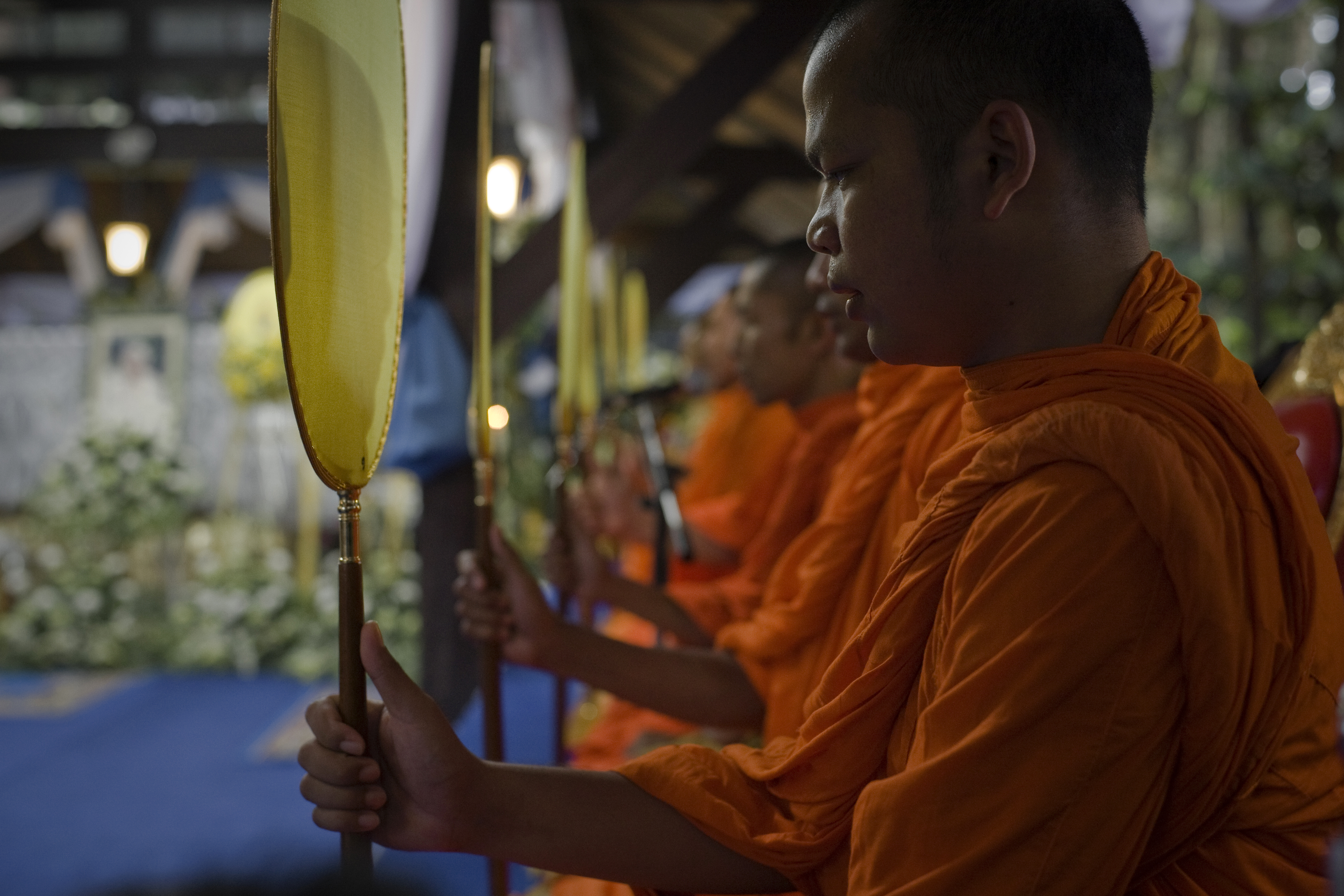
Guests and dignitaries (left); the coffin, decorated with flowers and wreaths (centre); and Buddhist monks (right) at the funeral services for the mother of former Prime Minister Chuan Leekpai

Thai funerals usually follow Buddhist funerary rites, with variations in practice depending on the culture of the region. People of certain religious and ethnic groups also have their own specific practices. Thai Buddhist funerals generally consist of a bathing ceremony shortly after death, daily chanting by Buddhist monks, and a cremation ceremony. Cremation is practised by most peoples throughout the country, with the major exceptions being ethnic Chinese, Muslims and Christians.

== Thai Buddhist funerals ==
While variations exist among the cultures of Thailand's different regions, most Buddhist funerals generally include the same common basic features.

The first ritual following death is the bathing ceremony. Today, it more commonly takes place as a ceremonial pouring of water. Guests to the ceremony will, one by one, pour water infused with lustral water over the hand of the deceased. Following the bathing ceremony, the hair is ritually combed and the body dressed and placed in the coffin; the undertaker will perform certain rituals during the process.

The coffin is then placed on display for merit making, and daily rites are held, with monks invited to chant the Abhidhamma. This was traditionally held at the home, but today it usually takes place at a Buddhist temple (wat), usually in the evening. Such rites are usually held for three, five or seven consecutive days. An important ritual during such funeral rites is bangsukun (บังสุกุล, from Pali paṃsukūla)—the offering of cloth to monks on behalf of the dead. Each chanting ceremony may be sponsored by a family member or friend who pays for refreshments and gifts (cloth, etc) to the monks.

The body is finally disposed of in a cremation ceremony, which takes place at a temple's crematorium (called men (เมรุ) in Thai for their symbolisation of Mount Meru). The body may be taken around the temple's crematorium three times in an anti-clockwise direction, usually via a cart which is pulled, by either Monks or family and friends. The body will then be taken up to the men, where the cremation will occur. Sometimes the cremation will be held after waiting a certain period (e.g. 100 days or a year following death). Merit-making rites are also held at 7, 50 and 100 days after death.

== Royal sponsorship ==
Royal sponsorship of funerals may be granted by the king, usually to government officials and high-ranking members of the country's honours system. These most often take the form of royally sponsored cremations or burials (granted in the form of royal flames or burial soil) and royally bestowed bathing water. Persons of high-standing may also be bestowed the use of a kot (โกศ) or funerary urn, which is an upright container used in place of a coffin, and the king or appointed members of the royal family may attend certain funerals in person.

== Funerals of senior Buddhist clergy and government officials ==
Government officials and distinguished armed forces and police personnel, as well as religious leaders, usually lie in state in Wat Ratchanatdaram or in other major Bangkok Buddhist temples (as well as in major provincial temples). While the lying-in-state for government officials and retired military and police personnel last from either 2 weeks to 5–7 months, the lying-in-state for senior members of the Buddhist clergy can last from 6–8 months to two years, with Buddhist services led by monks with prayers made while using the pha yong or memorial ribbon attached to the urn held 3 to 4 times a day with chanting by 4 monks (for lay funerals) or 8 for clergical funerals also being performed. If necessary the Flag of Thailand is lowered to half-mast. A piphat nang hong and/or piphat Mon traditional ensemble plays in these events, while in some funerals the instruments of the piphat are combined with Western musical instruments.

When the 100-day mark for state funerals is reached, special commemorative books, pamphlets, and flyers containing Buddhist doctrines and on the funeral service are commissioned and special services are held.

Once everything is set for cremation as per Buddhist and Hindu customs, the cremation proper begins with one final late-night service for the decreased officially kicking off the cremation services.

The funeral procession is held from the temple or funeral hall towards the nearest crematorium. For senior state, military and police officials the Royal Thai Armed Forces and the Royal Thai Police provide the funeral escort detachment, buglers, and the military band (plus a firing party and for high-ranking officers an artillery battery). For senior and high-ranking Buddhist clergymen the King's Guards Corps or units of the RTAF and/or the RTP can be ordered to provide the funeral escorts and the massed bands, while other RTAF personnel serve as linemen and the BRH provides the traditional funeral carriage if the funeral is for the Supreme Patriarch of Thailand. The cremation proper is then held in the evening, and on the following day the ashes of the deceased are obtained, a breakfast service is held and the ashes are transferred, some to the temple and others to the residence of the deceased, for deceased Buddhist clergymen their ashes and relics are interred in the nearest temple.

For funerals of government officials and distinguished armed forces and police personnel a three-volley salute is fired, while for senior high-ranking officials a gun salute is fired:

- 15 for all other general, flag and air general officers and other ministers of state
- 17 for the Chief of Defense Forces, the Commanders of the Army, Navy and Air Force and the Commissioner General of Police and provincial governors, all if deceased while in office as well as for former provincial governors and all retired former Chiefs of Defense Forces, Commanders of the Army, Navy and Air Force and Commissioner Generals of Police, for a deceased serving or former Deputy Prime Minister or Minister of Defence
- 19 for a deceased serving or former Prime Minister of Thailand

Maha Chai is played by a marching band during the honors for a deceased Prime Minister while for all other officials and all general and police officers including general officers, flag officers and air general officers Maha Roek can be played as a General Salute tune.

== Royal funerals ==
Funerals of members of the royal family are grand elaborate events, organised as a royal ceremony and akin to a state funeral. The grandest events most notably involve a royal cremation ceremony in a purpose-built phra merumat (พระเมรุมาศ, royal crematorium) in the royal field of Sanam Luang in Bangkok's historic centre. These grand funerals are for the King, Queen, and senior-ranked members of the Royal Family.

== Expenses ==
Thai funerals can be an elaborate event; hosts are expected to provide meals for the guests, and historically, theatrical entertainment was provided by those of higher status. Although modern funerals are usually more solemn, in some rural areas the entertaining of guests still plays an important role. The Thai language includes such idioms as khon tai khai khon pen (คนตายขายคนเป็น, lit. "the dead sell the living"), referring to the act of hosting expensive funerals plunging living descendants into debt.
