= Hatsadiling =

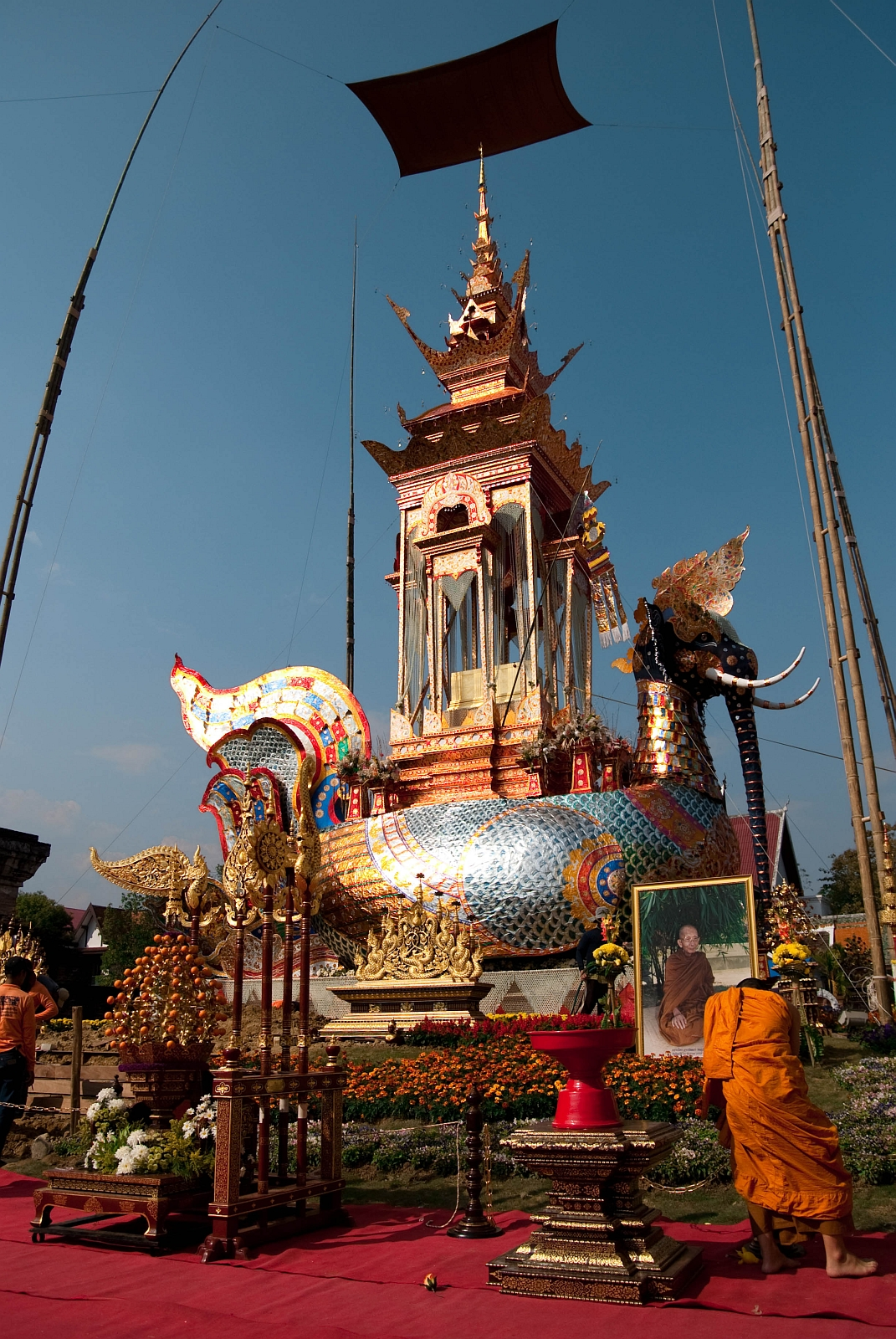
A Northern Thai funerary hearse featuring the hatsadiling.

Hatsadiling (Thai: หัสดีลิงค์; Burmese: ဟတ္ထီလိင်္ဂ; Pali: hatthīliṅga; Sanskrit: hastilinga) is a mythical bird commonly featured in Northern Thai art. The creature is considered to be the size of a house, with the head and body of a lion, trunk and tusks of an elephant, the comb of a cock, and the wings of a bird. According to an oral myth in northeastern Thailand, the bird once inhabited the legendary forest of Himavanta. The bird is often featured as a motif on funerary hearses of prominent Buddhist monks in Northern Thailand during phongyibyan cremation ceremonies. The hatsadiling (hathi linga) has also been used by the Marma people as a primary motif for funerary hearses.

The bird was considered instrumental in the founding of Hariphunchai, a Mon kingdom in modern-day Thailand. It is featured in Cāmadevivaṃsa, a Pali chronicle that recounts the founding of the Hariphunchai kingdom by Queen Camadevi. The Dhammapada-aṭṭhakathā mentions the hastilinga. Buddhaghoṣa mentions it as an animal which possesses the strength of five elephants.

== Other terms ==
In the Thai language, the bird is also known by a number of terms, including nok hatstadiling (นกหัสดีลิงค์), nok hatsading (นกหัสดิน), nok hatsadi (นกหัสดี) and nok hat.

== See also ==
- Phongyibyan
- Pyinsarupa
