= Samuel J. Smith =

British missionary and printer (1820–1909)

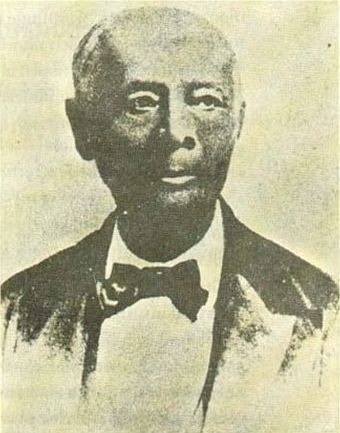
- Born: 6 July 1820
- Died: 10 October 1909 (aged 89)
- Occupations: Missionary; printer; publisher
- Years active: 1849–1909
- Parents: John Taylor Jones (adoptive father); Eliza Grew Jones (adoptive mother)

Samuel Jones Smith (Note: Some sources list the middle name as John.) (6 July 1820 – 10 October 1909) was a Baptist missionary of Indo-British birth who became well-known as a printer and publisher in Siam (Thailand).

== Early life and education ==
He was adopted in Burma by American missionaries John Taylor Jones and his wife Eliza, before the couple took up a new posting in Bangkok in 1833. Smith was sent to be educated in the United States.

== Career ==
He returned to Bangkok as a missionary in 1849. In 1869, he left the mission and established a printing house, publishing several newspapers such as The Siam Weekly Advertiser as well as many popular works of Thai literature.
