= John Taylor Jones =

American Christian missionary (1802–1851)

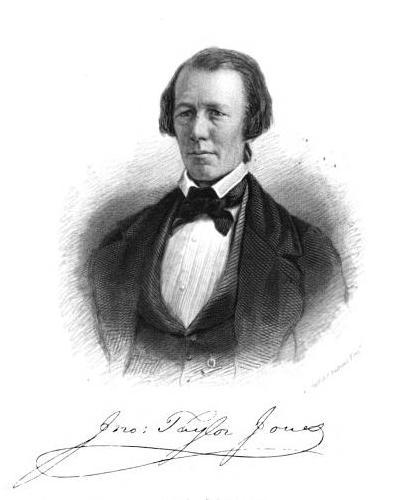
- Born: July 16, 1802; New Ipswich, New Hampshire, U.S.
- Died: September 13, 1851 (aged 49); Bangkok, Siam
- Education: Brown College; Amherst College; Andover Theological Seminary; Newton Theological Institution
- Occupation: Missionary
- Years active: 1830–1851
- Spouses: Eliza Coltman Grew (m. 1830; died 1838) Judith Leavitt (m. 1840; died 1846) Sarah Sleeper (m. 1847)

John Taylor Jones (July 16, 1802 – September 13, 1851) was an American missionary, and one of the earliest Protestant missionary to Siam (now Thailand) with his wife, Eliza Grew Jones. He is credited with introducing to Siam the modern world map, and producing a translation of the New Testament in Siamese (Thai) from Greek.

== Early life and education ==
Jones was born in New Ipswich, New Hampshire, on July 16, 1802, to Elisha and Persia Taylor Jones. He attended preparatory school at New Ipswich Academy and Bradford Academy. He attended Brown College from 1819 to 1820, and worked as a teacher from 1820 to 1823. He graduated from Amherst College in 1825, and undertook graduate studies at Andover Theological Seminary from 1827 to 1830, and then at Newton Theological Institution in 1830.

== Career ==
He married Eliza Grew Jones on July 14, 1830, and was ordained in Boston on July 28, 1830, as a missionary to Burma under the American Baptist Missionary Union (ABMU). He and his wife set sail for the country shortly thereafter. Rev. and Mrs. Jones worked with Adoniram Judson in Burma, residing for about two years at Maulmein, and later at Rangoon.

After Karl Gutzlaff petitioned the ABMU for more missionaries, the Rev. and Mrs. Jones were reassigned to Siam in 1832. Destined to become the first long-term Protestant missionaries in the country, they arrived in April 1833 on the schooner Reliance owned by Robert Hunter, who was a friend of the Siamese foreign minister (known only by his office, that of praklang.) Hunter had interceded with him on behalf of Rev. Gutzlaff, who, in an excess of zeal, offended the Siamese within the first two days of his arrival by throwing thousands of tracts into many cottages, and every floating house, boat, and junk—following which he was ordered expelled and his tracts burnt. Hunter persuaded the praklang to have the tracts translated for the king to read. The king found nothing objectionable in them, but said candidly and openly that he preferred his own religion. The Rev. and Mrs. Jones were made welcome in the accommodations of the embassy of diplomatist Edmund Roberts until their own could be made ready. Hunter introduced Rev. Jones to the praklang, who received him with apparent kindness, likely because they were American citizens. Roberts, indeed, had been told American negotiations for a treaty were proceeding at an unprecedented pace. Rev. Jones informed Roberts that Major Burney, the British ambassador at the court of Ava who had six years previously negotiated the Burney Treaty, told Rev. Jones that Americans were decidedly preferred to any other foreigners. The praklang sent down a boat to convey Rev. Jones and his family to their new residence at Cokai, which had been arranged by the French-, English-, and Siamese–speaking Portuguese consul Mr. Silveiro, near a campong [settlement] of Burmese. The residence had been previously occupied by a Mr. Abeel, another American missionary, of whom Roberts writes:

Mr. Abeel is held here in the highest estimation, by those who have the pleasure of his acquaintance. He possesses talents of a very superior order, and acquirements that do great credit to his industry; is mild and conciliating in his manners, forcible in his arguments, yet possessing a sufficient degree of zeal, never giving offence to the government, nor creating dislike by being over-zealous, and thereby disgusting the natives; but the bad state of his health would not permit him to remain on this good missionary ground, which may be made, in a few years, ready for the harvest.

Mr.Jones had completed in September 1833, a catechism on geography and astronomy in Siamese, besides translating into that language a small Burman tract containing a summary of Christian doctrines.

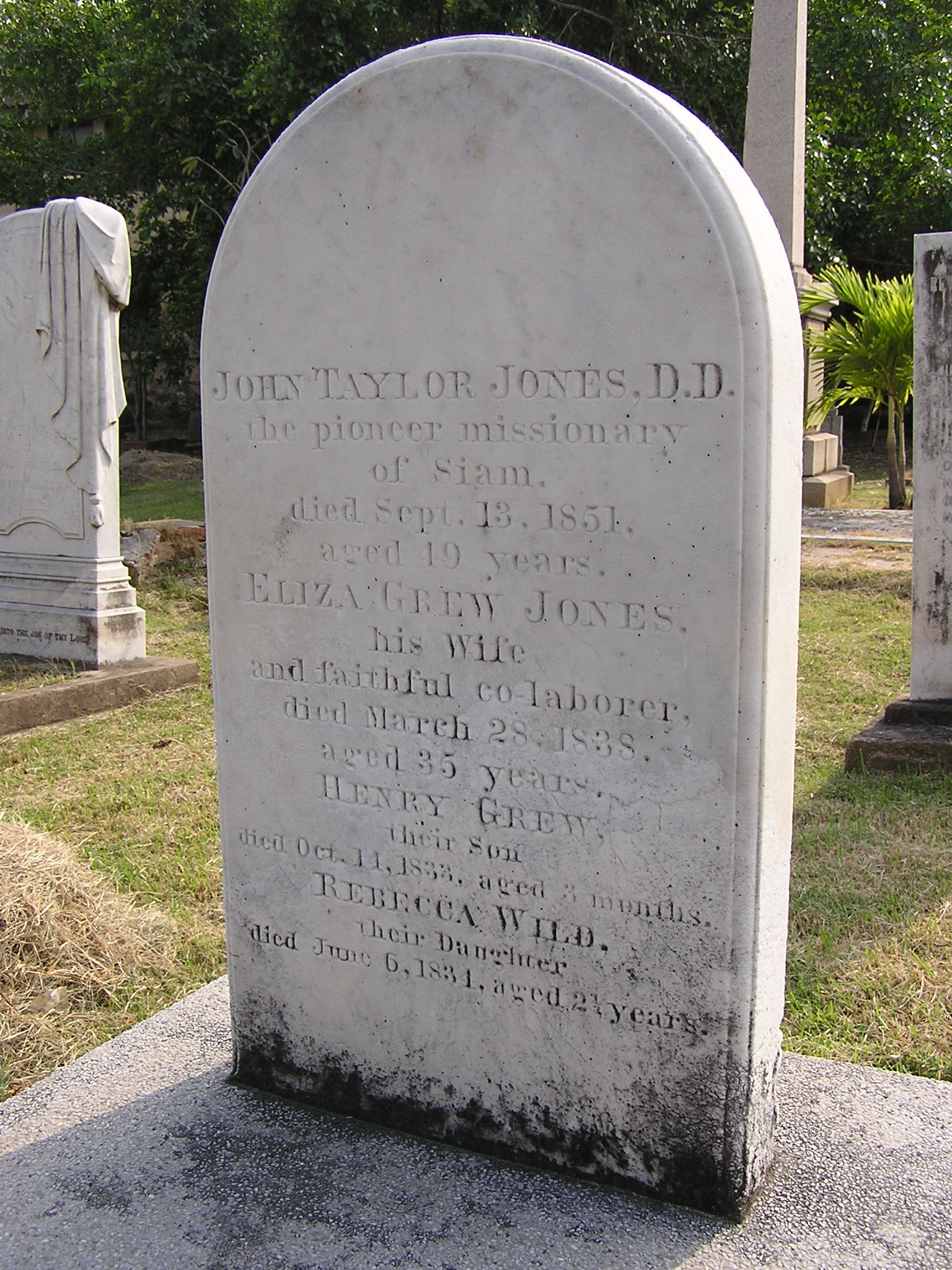
Grave of J.T. and Eliza Jones and children

== Personal life ==
Eliza Jones died of cholera at Bangkok on March 28, 1838. Rev. Jones remarried in November 1840, to Judith Leavitt. She died at sea on March 21, 1846, while en route back to the U.S. with her husband and daughter. He was married for a third and final time on August 20, 1847, to Sarah Sleeper (Gilford, New Hampshire, December 5, 1812 – Bangkok, April 30, 1889) who, after Jones' death in 1851, had in turn married Jones' adopted son Rev S.J. Smith on October 26, 1853. Sleeper served 42 years as a missionary in Bangkok.

== Death ==
Jones died on September 13, 1851. He is buried at the Bangkok Protestant Cemetery.

== Works ==
- Various tracts in Siamese (1834)
- Brief Grammatical Notices of the Siamese Language (1842)
- Siamese translation of the New Testament (1843)

== See also ==
- Dan Beach Bradley
