= The Siam Weekly Advertiser =

Defunct newspaper in Bangkok, Thailand

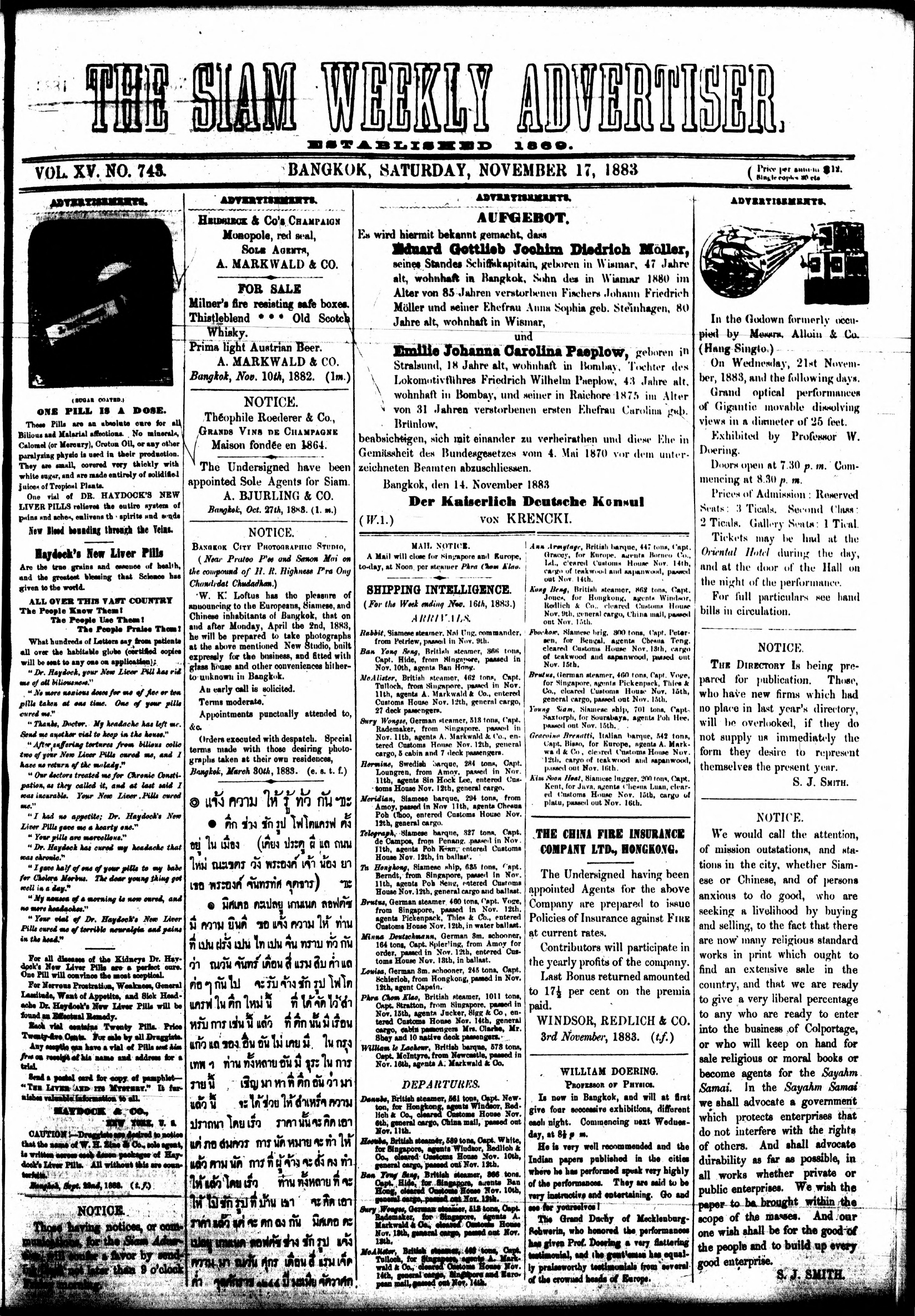
- 17 November 1883 issue of The Siam Weekly Advertiser
- Editor: Samuel J. Smith
- Founded: 26 August 1869
- Language: English
- Ceased publication: 7 August 1886
- Headquarters: Bangkok, Thailand

The Siam Weekly Advertiser was an English-language newspaper published in Thailand that was founded in 1869 by British missionary Samuel J. Smith. Its first issue was published on 26 August 1869. It ceased publication on 7 August 1886.

== See also ==
- Timeline of English-language newspapers published in Thailand
- List of online newspaper archives - Thailand
