= Buddhist funeral =

Buddhist rites after a person's death

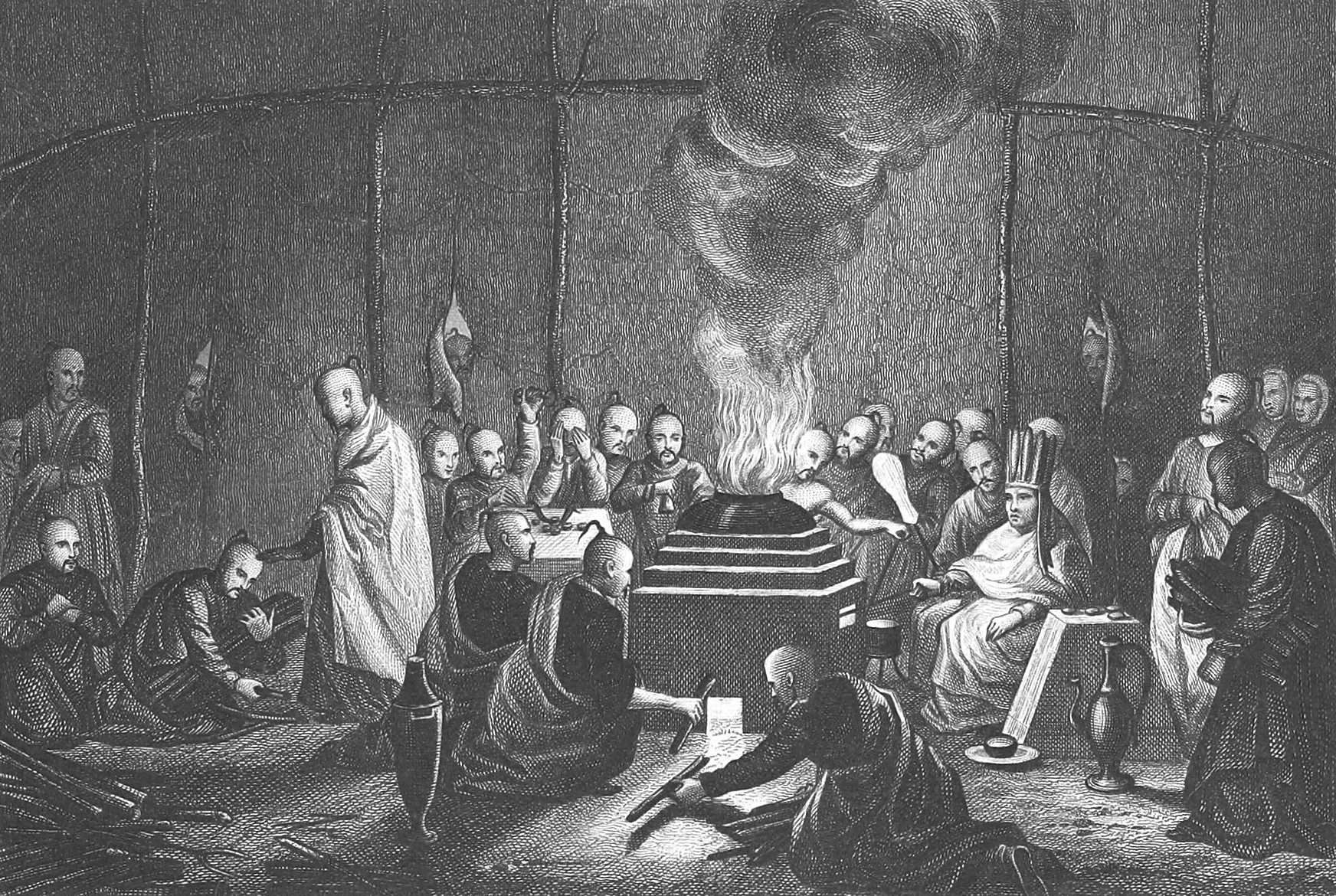
Funeral ceremony of the Dalai Lama, by Johann Georg Heck.

Among Buddhists, death is regarded as one of the occasions of major religious significance, both for the deceased and for the survivors. For the deceased, it marks the moment when the transition begins to a new mode of existence within the round of rebirths (see Bhavacakra). When death occurs, all the karmic forces that the dead person accumulated during the course of their lifetime become activated and determine the next rebirth. For the living, death is a powerful reminder of the Buddha's teaching on impermanence; it also provides an opportunity to assist the deceased person as they transition to a new existence. There are several academic reviews of this subject. In Buddhism, death marks the transition from this life to the next for the deceased.

== Theravada traditions ==
For the non-Arhat, death is a time of transitioning to another rebirth; thus, the living participate in acts that transfer merit to the departed, either providing for a more auspicious rebirth or for the relief of suffering in the departed's new existence. For the living, ceremonies marking another's death are a reminder of life's impermanence, a fundamental aspect of the Buddha's teaching. Death rites are generally the only life cycle ritual that Theravāda Buddhist monks get involved in and are therefore of great importance.

A distinctive ritual unique to funeral rites is the offering of cloth to monks. This is known as paṃsukūla in Pali, which means "forsaken robe". This symbolises the discarded rags and body shrouds that monks used for their robes during the time of the Buddha.

=== Customs in Sri Lanka ===
- Offering of cloth on behalf of the dead (mataka-vastra-puja): Before a cremation or a burial (depends on the will of the dead person or his/her relatives), at the deceased's home or cemetery, the funeral's presiding monastics are offered a white cloth to be subsequently stitched into monastic robes. During this ceremony, the following verse which was, according to the Mahaparinibbana Sutta, spoken by god Sakka after the death of the Buddha, is recited:

Impermanent alas are formations, subject to rise and fall. Having arisen, they cease; their subsiding is bliss.	Aniccā vata saṅkhārā, uppādavayadhammino. Uppajjitvā nirujjhanti tesaṃ vūpasamo sukho.

In addition, as relatives pour water from a vessel to an overflowing cup to symbolize the giving of merit to the deceased, the following verses are recited:

As water raining on a hill flows down to the valley, even so does what is given here benefit the dead.	Unname udakaṃ vaṭṭhaṃ yathā ninnaṃ pavattati evameva ito dinnaṃ petānaṃ upakappati.
As rivers full of water fill the ocean full, even so does what is given here benefit the dead.	Yathā vārivahā pūrā paripūrenti sāgaraṃ Evameva ito dinnaṃ petānaṃ upakappati.

- Preaching for the benefit of the dead (mataka-bana): Within a week after the funeral (usually on the third day after), a monastic returns to the deceased's home to provide an appropriate hour-long sermon for surviving relatives and neighbors. The sermon is usually held on the sixth day after the death; family, friends and neighbours are often treated to a meal afterwards.
- Offering in the name of the dead (mataka-dana): Made three months after the funeral and then annually afterwards, the deceased's survivors hold an almsgiving on their behalf.

== Mahayana traditions ==
In China, numerous instructive and merit-transferring ceremonies are held during the forty-nine days between death and rebirth. It is widely held that, without embarking on the path of spiritual cultivation and attaining the Four Higher Realms, the soul of the deceased will be transmigrated within the Six Realms of Existence. Helping the deceased to ascend to a higher realm (Chaodu, 超渡) becomes an important issue for family members or friends of the deceased within forty-nine days of their death. People often resort to methods such as chanting or recitation of Buddhist scriptures to help the deceased.

For most Chinese funerals, if a Buddhist ceremony is chosen, the practice of recitation of the Amitabha Sutra and the name of Amitabha is an important part of death rites. Many other scriptures or a combination of classic Buddhist scriptures, such as the Great Compassion Mantra, the Heart Sutra, the Amitabha Pure Land Rebirth Mantra and Sapta Atitabuddha Karasaniya Dharani (or Qi Fo Mie Zui Zhen Yan 七佛滅罪真言), are also commonly used. Along with cultural practices, such as the burning of joss paper (which is discouraged by most practicing Buddhists), practitioners are often cremated.

=== Exposure of the Corpse ===
"Exposure of the Corpse" (Lushizang, 露屍葬) is the practice of placing the body of the deceased in an open area instead of using coffins or sarcophagi. In the Indian tradition, the practice of exposing the corpse included putting the body in the forest or sinking it underwater. Originating from India, medieval Chinese monks also practiced exposing the corpse in the woods but so far no textual evidence supports the practice of water burial. In addition, cave burial (Shishi yiku 石室瘞窟) was also a type of Lushizang in medieval China.

The point of exposing the corpse was to offer the body to hungry birds and beasts. After that, the remains were collected. There were three ways to dispose of the remains:

- Collect the remains from the woods, bury them or place them in a pagoda
- Cremate the remains, then bury the ashes or place them in a pagoda
- Cremate the remains, then distribute the ashes in the woods or water

=== Cave burial ===
Starting from the third century AD, Chinese monks used caves as the resting place for the deceased. This funeral practice (石室瘞窟) may have been influenced by Central Asian practices. Compared to forest burial, cave burial was less direct than exposure.

Before medieval times, the word "stone cave" (Shishi, 石室) can either mean the government library or suggest the main room in an ancestral temple (Zongmiao宗廟). To make Buddhist funerary caves, one can adopt the three methods:

- Use natural caves or grottos
- Make slight changes to existing grottos
- Pile up stones to make new caves

To achieve the goal of giving one's body to the animals, most caves and grottos were open. The few exceptions include the north cliff of Longmen wanfo gou (龍門萬佛溝). Generally, monks used the sitting position and practiced dhuta (Toutuo, 頭陀). These caves were reusable and most of them were found in Chang'an and Longmen. Dunhuang and Sichuan also have such caves.

=== Forest burial ===
Chinese monks began the practice of "forest burial" (Linzang, 林葬) from the fifth century CE. Reputedly the famous monk of the Eastern Jin, Huiyuan, was the first in China to practice forest burial.

This practice might have been very popular in the sixth century CE. According to the Book of Chen (陳書), even lay people attempted to adopt this funerary method. The term "Cool Grove" (Shituolin 屍陀林) was applied to describe the exposing place, or used as a general term for this practice.

After the sixth century CE, the number of documents recording forest burial increased. In Daoxuan's Biographies of Eminent Monks (Xugaosenzhuan 繼高僧傳), there were many stories with such descriptions. According to Daoxuan and other epitaphs of monks, there were two types of monks who practiced forest burial:

- the monks of the Three Stages Sect. This sect took both monks and lay practitioners including female believers. The most famous places for the Three Stages Sect were Zhongnan Mountains and Baoshan.
- other monks of different sects, usually from the Chang'an area. They focused on Chan learning and valued lineage. Those monks practiced in temples such as Chang'an Yanxing Temple, Chang'an Shengguang Temple and Chang'an Qingchan Temple.

=== Mummification ===
While mummification does occur as a funeral custom in a variety of Buddhist traditions, it is not a common practice; cremation is more common. Many Mahayana Buddhist monks noted in their last testaments a desire for their students to bury them sitting in a lotus posture, put into a vessel full of coal, wood, paper and/or lime and surrounded by bricks, and be exhumed after approximately three years. The preserved bodies would be painted with paints and adorned with gold. Many were so respected that they were preserved by their students. They were called "Corporeal Bodhisattvas", similar to that of the Roman Catholic incorruptibles. Many were destroyed during the cultural revolution in China, some were preserved, such as Huineng, the Sixth Patriarch of Ch'an Buddhism and Kim Kiaokak, a Korean Buddhist monk revered as a manifestation of Ksitigarbha, and some have been discovered recently: one such was the Venerable Tzu Hang in Taiwan; another was the Venerable Yuet Kai in Hong Kong.

Other notable examples of Buddhist mummification are Dashi-Dorzho Itigilov in Siberia, Loung Pordaeng in Thailand, and a 15th-century Tibetan monk from Northern India examined by Victor Mair in the documentary The Mystery of the Tibetan Mummy. While the documentary suggests that the monk may have consumed poisonous matters on purpose, there is no proof of such practice for any of the mentioned persons, so the poisonous substances occasionally found in their remains may have been applied to their corpses by their followers.

== Tibetan traditions ==
A person who is dying and who is recently dead will have for example the Tibetan Book of the Dead read to them (in the Nyingma tradition) to help guide them through the transition period (Tib.: bardo) between lives, easing attachments to this life and deepening bodhisattva wisdom. The corpse is either cremated or dismembered and fed to vultures (Tib.: jhator).

Other Tibetan traditions have other special texts read and rituals performed, which may also be personalized to the specific (vajrayana) practice a person focused on during his/her life. As the bardo is generally said to last a maximum of 49 days, these rituals usually last 49 days.

Death and dying is an important subject in Tibetan Buddhism as it is a most critical period for deciding which karma will ripen to lead one to the next rebirth, so a proper control of the mind at the death process is considered essential. Preparation for death is considered important because one's mental state at death may influence the subsequent rebirth process.

After prolonged meditation, the meditator continues into the bardo or even towards enlightenment. Great masters are often cremated, and their ashes stored as relics in stupas.

In Tibet, firewood was scarce, and the ground often not suitable for burial, so the unusual practice of feeding the body to vultures or other animals developed. Known in Tibetan as jhator and literally translated as "Alms to the Birds", this practice is known as Sky burial. One can see this also as an offering to these animals, a last act of generosity and detachment to one's own body.

== See also ==
- Mahāparinibbāṇa Sutta
- Upajjhatthana Sutta
- Jarāmaraṇa
- Phongyibyan
- Burmese pagoda
- Thai funeral
- Cheondojae

== Bibliography ==
- Harvey, Peter (1990). An introduction to Buddhism: Teachings, history and practices. Cambridge: Cambridge University. ISBN 0-521-31333-3.
- Kariyawasam, A.G.S. (1995). Buddhist Ceremonies and Rituals of Sri Lanka (The Wheel Publication No. 402/404). Kandy, Sri Lanka: Buddhist Publication Society. Retrieved 2007-10-22 from "Access to Insight" (1996 transcription) at http://www.accesstoinsight.org/lib/authors/kariyawasam/wheel402.html.
- Langer, Rita (2007). Buddhist Rituals of Death and Rebirth: A study of contemporary Sri Lankan practice and its origins. Abingdon: Routledge. ISBN 0-415-39496-1
- Thanissaro Bhikkhu (trans.) (1994). Tirokudda Kanda: Hungry Shades Outside the Walls (Khp. 7). Retrieved 2008-09-04 from "Access to Insight" at http://www.accesstoinsight.org/tipitaka/kn/khp/khp.1-9.than.html#khp-7.
- Buddhists commonly believe that life and death are a part of a cycle known as Saṃsāra (Buddhism)
