= Bangkok Protestant Cemetery =

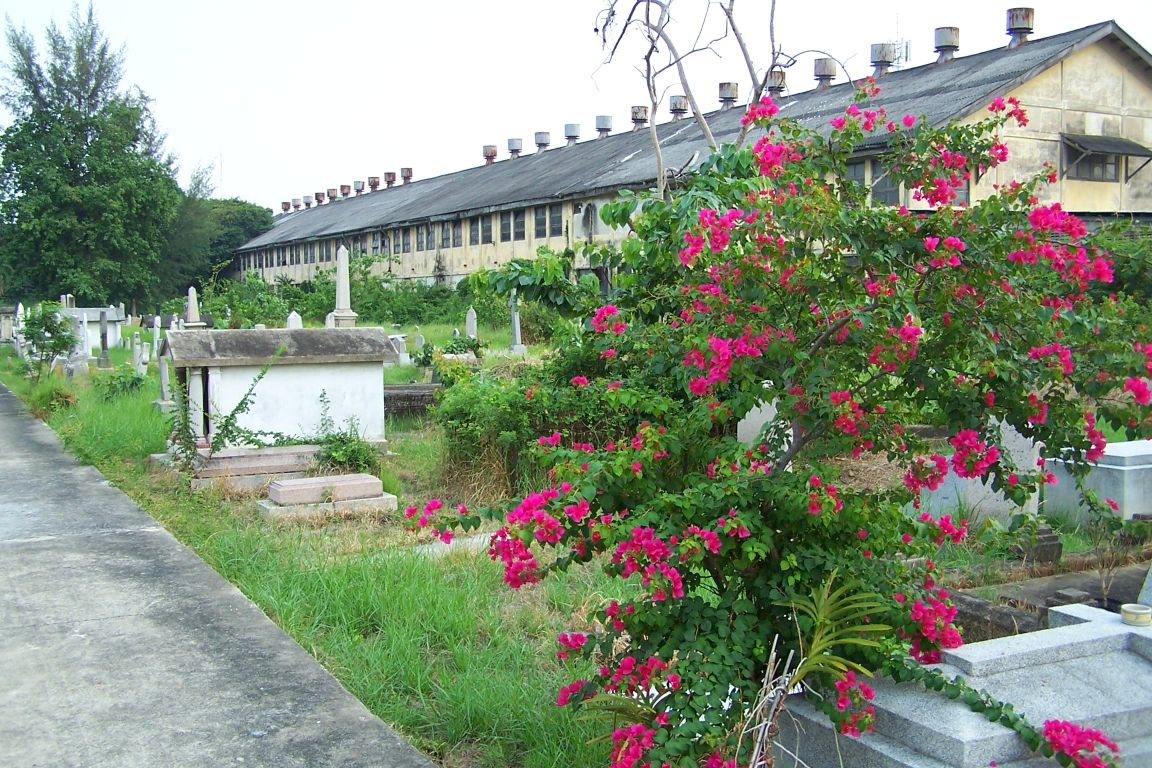
- A view of the Bangkok Protestant Cemetery looking east
- Interactive map of Bangkok Protestant Cemetery

Details
- Established: 1853
- Location: Soi 72/5, Charoen Krung Road, Bangkok
- Country: Thailand
- Coordinates: 13°42′22″N 100°30′20″E
- Type: For resident Protestant Christian foreigners of Thailand
- Style: Protestant cemetery
- No. of graves: 1,800

The Bangkok Protestant Cemetery is a cemetery catering mainly to the foreign community in Bangkok. To date, the cemetery has over 1800 interments (around 1100 names are legible on extant gravestones and memorials), and it is still accepting burials on a limited basis. The burial register is kept by Christ Church Bangkok (11 Convent Road).

There are also a number of Jewish graves here, since before 1997 there was no other place in the city for the small Jewish community to bury their dead. This changed with the opening of the Jewish Cemetery, in a separate property adjacent to this cemetery.

== History ==
The Bangkok Protestant Cemetery was founded by a royal land grant given by King Mongkut on 29 July 1853, to address the need for burial space for Bangkok's growing Protestant community.

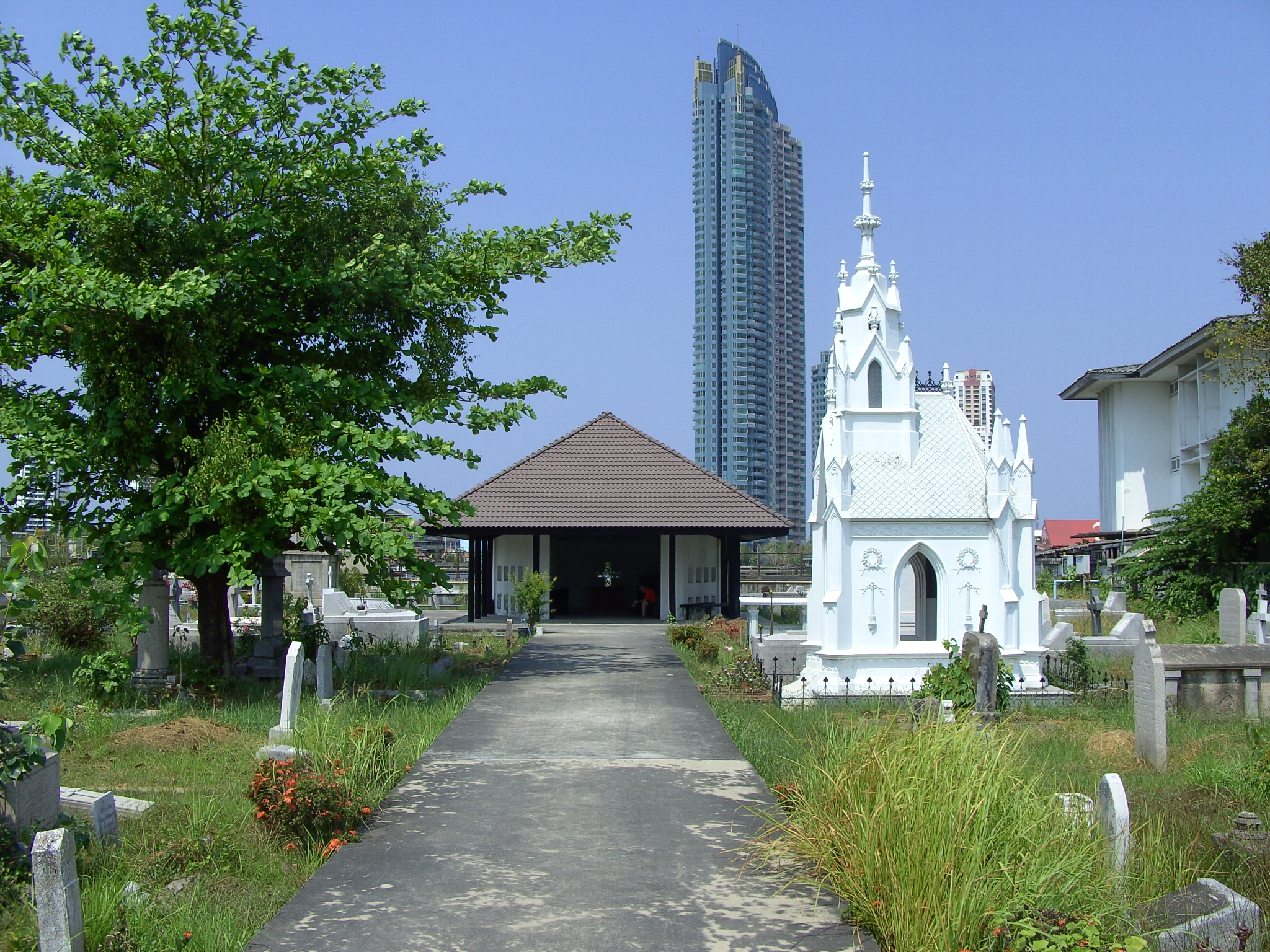
Central path and chapel, looking west to the Chao Phraya River

== Location ==
The cemetery is located on the banks of the Chao Phraya River just south of the Menam Riverside Hotel, and 1.75 km south of the Saphan Taksin BTS station along Charoen Krung Road. It is very close to the Asiatique night market.

== Notable Interments ==
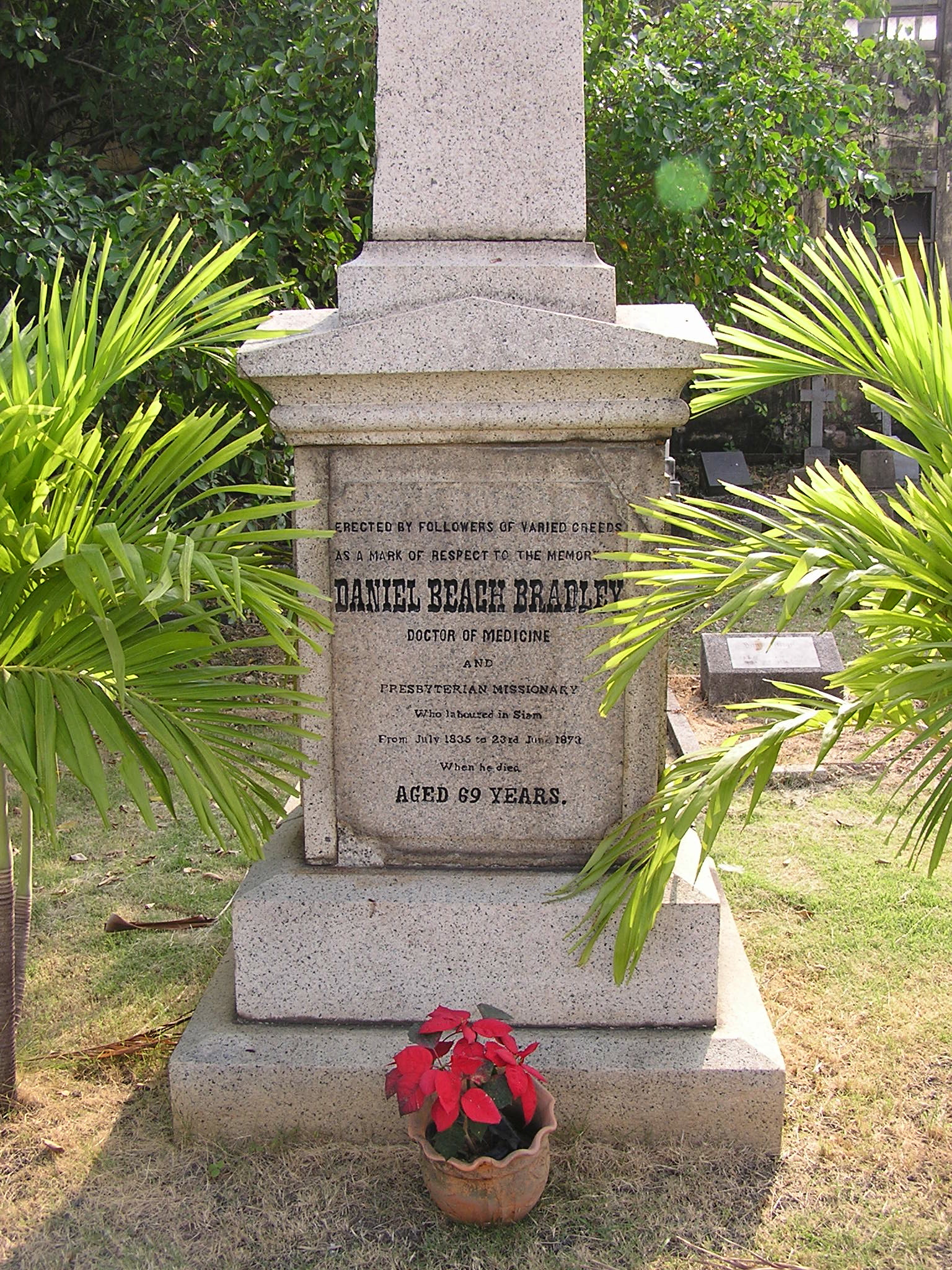
Grave of Dan Beach Bradley

- Dan Beach Bradley – medical doctor and missionary
- John Taylor Jones – missionary
- Eliza Grew Jones – missionary and wife of J. T. Jones
- William Henry Adelbert Feilding – general of the Coldstream Guards
- Sir John Bush, Admiral – Harbour Master
- Henry Alabaster – advisor to the King of Siam
- John Fennell Belbin, Captain of the SS Bangkok, who died at his post, 1876, aged 34
- Albert Jucker, Consul of Italy, (1844–1885)
- Hamilton King, Envoy Extraordinary and Minister Plenipotentiary of the United States, (born St. John's, Newfoundland 1852–1912)
- Caroline Isabella Knox Leonowens – daughter-in-law of Anna Leonowens of The King and I fame.
- Sungkas Thongborisute M.D. FACS (1932–1999)
- Brian Charles Dade, Able Seaman, British Royal Navy, of HMS London, died 1965 aged 25
- Friedrich Schaefer, M.D., founder of and surgeon at King Chulalongkorn Memorial Hospital, who died from an infection acquired when operating 1914
- Hans Herzfeld, banker and chief accountant with the Bombay Burma Trading Corporation, who died 1950 aged 57.
- George Dupont (Yod) – A Siamese man who took part in the American Civil War.
- Frank Fillis, entertainer and owner of the South African circus company Fillis' Circus.
