= Eliza Grew Jones =

American Christian missionary and lexicographer (1803–1838)

- Born: Eliza Coltman Grew; March 30, 1803; Providence, Rhode Island, U.S.
- Died: March 28, 1838 (aged 34); Bangkok, Siam
- Resting place: Bangkok Protestant Cemetery
- Occupations: Missionary; lexicographer
- Years active: 1832–1838
- Known for: Creating a romanized script for the Siamese language; creating the first Siamese-English dictionary
- Spouse: John Taylor Jones (m. 1830)

Eliza Grew Jones (born Eliza Coltman Grew; March 30, 1803 – March 28, 1838) was an American Baptist missionary and lexicographer. She created a romanized script for writing the Siamese language, and created the first Siamese-English dictionary.

== Early life ==
Eliza Coltman Grew was born on March 30, 1803. Her father, Rev. Henry Grew, was a native of Providence, Rhode Island. Presaging her future accomplishments, an early school teacher noted that she had an unusual ability in languages, learning Greek without the aid of a teacher.

== Career ==
She married Rev. Dr. John Taylor Jones on July 14, 1830. Her husband was ordained in Boston two weeks later under the American Baptist Missionary Union, and the couple was then assigned to work in Burma. They lived there for over two years before being transferred to Siam.

Jones' first large work was a Siamese-English dictionary that she completed in December 1833, after she had been transferred to Siam. It was not published due to the difficulty of printing with Siamese type, and thought to be lost until an untitled manuscript in the British Museum Library was identified in 2007 as an extant copy of the lost Jones dictionary. Later, she also created a romanized script for writing the Siamese language. She wrote portions of Biblical history in Siamese.

In Burma and Thailand, she gave birth to four children, two of whom died in childhood.

== Death ==
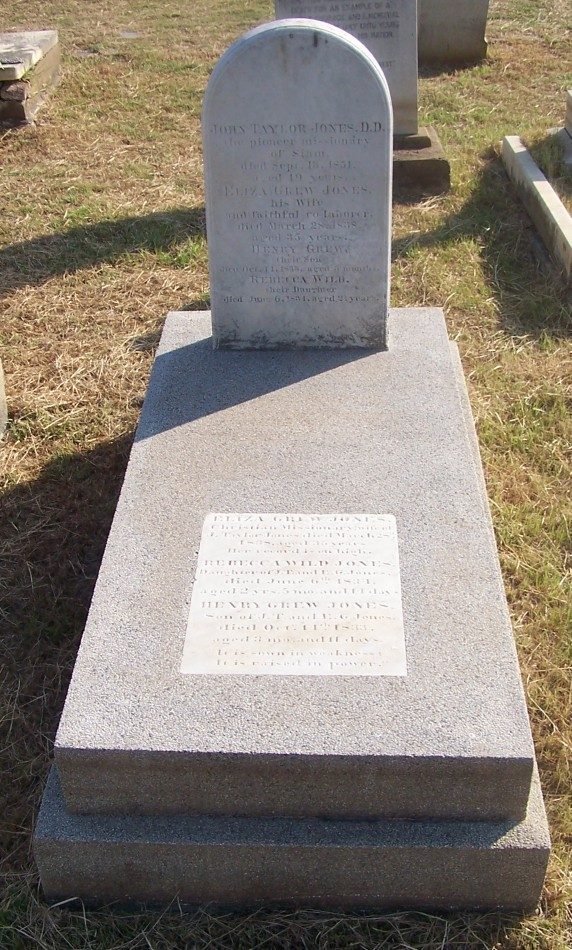
The grave of Eliza Grew Jones in the Bangkok Protestant Cemetery

Jones died in Bangkok of cholera on March 28, 1838. She is buried in the Bangkok Protestant Cemetery.
