= Battle of Cedar Creek order of battle: Union =

The following Union Army units and commanders fought in the Battle of Cedar Creek of the American Civil War. The battle was fought on October 19, 1864. Order of battle compiled from the army organization during the campaign. The Confederate order of battle is listed separately.

== Abbreviations used ==
=== Military rank ===
- MG = Major General
- BG = Brigadier General
- Col = Colonel
- Ltc = Lieutenant Colonel
- Maj = Major
- Cpt = Captain

=== Other ===
- w = wounded
- mw = mortally wounded
- k = killed

== Army of the Shenandoah ==
MG Philip Sheridan, Commanding
MG Horatio Wright

Escort:

- 17th Pennsylvania Cavalry (detachment): Maj Weidner H. Spera
- 6th U. S. Cavalry: Cpt Ira W. Claffin

=== VI Corps ===
BG James B. Ricketts (w)
BG George W. Getty
MG Horatio Wright

Escort: 1st Michigan Cavalry, Company G: Lieutenant William H. Wheeler

Division	Brigade	Regiments and Others
First Division BG Frank Wheaton	1st Brigade Col William Henry Penrose (w); Ltc Edward L. Campbell (w); Cpt Baldwin Hufty	4th New Jersey: Cpt Baldwin Hufty; 10th New Jersey: Maj Lambert Boeman (k), Cpt Charles D. Claypool; 15th New Jersey: Ltc Edward L. Campbell, Cpt James W. Penrose
First Division BG Frank Wheaton	2nd Brigade Col Joseph Eldridge Hamblin (w); Col Ranald S. Mackenzie (w); Ltc Egbert Olcott	2nd Connecticut Heavy Artillery: Col Ranald S. Mackenzie, Maj Edward W. Jones; 65th New York: Ltc T. H. Higginbotham (k), Cpt Henry C. Fisk; 121st New York: Ltc Egbert Olcott, Cpt Daniel D. Jackson; 95th Pennsylvania: Cpt Dan Harper; 96th Pennsylvania: Cpt Dan Harper
First Division BG Frank Wheaton	3rd Brigade Col Oliver Edwards	37th Massachusetts: Ltc George L. Montague; 49th Pennsylvania: Ltc Baynton J. Hickman; 82nd Pennsylvania: Col Isaac C. Bassett; 119th Pennsylvania: Ltc Gideon Clark; 2nd Rhode Island (battalion): Cpt Elisha Hunt Rhodes; 5th Wisconsin (battalion): Maj Charles W. Kempf; 17th Pennsylvania Cavalry: Maj Coe Durland
Second Division BG George W. Getty; BG Lewis A. Grant; BG George W. Getty	1st Brigade Col James M. Warner	62nd New York: Ltc Theodore B. Hamilton; 93rd Pennsylvania: Cpt David C. Keller; 98th Pennsylvania: Ltc John B. Kohler (k), Cpt Gottfried Bauer.; 102nd Pennsylvania: Maj James H. Coleman (k), Cpt James Patchell (w); 139th Pennsylvania: Ltc John G. Parr
Second Division BG George W. Getty; BG Lewis A. Grant; BG George W. Getty	2nd Brigade BG Lewis A. Grant; Ltc Amasa Tracy; BG Lewis A. Grant	2nd Vermont: Ltc Amasa Tracy, Cpt Elijah Wales, Ltc Amasa Tracy; 3rd Vermont, (battalion): Maj Horace W. Floyd; 4th Vermont: Maj Horace W. Floyd, Col George P. Foster; 5th Vermont: Maj Enoch E. Johnson; 6th Vermont, (battalion): Cpt Edwin R. Kinney (w), Cpt William J. Sperry.; 11th Vermont (1st Heavy Artillery): Ltc Charles Hunsdon
Second Division BG George W. Getty; BG Lewis A. Grant; BG George W. Getty	3rd Brigade BG Daniel D. Bidwell (k); Ltc Winsor B. French	1st Maine Veterans: Maj Stephen C. Fletcher; 43rd New York (battalion): Maj Charles A. Milliken; 49th New York (battalion): Ltc Erastus D. Holt; 77th New York: Ltc Winsor B. French; 122d New York: Ltc Augustus W. Dwight (w), Maj Jabez M. Brower (w); 61st Pennsylvania (battalion): Cpt David J. Taylor
Third Division Col J. Warren Keifer	1st Brigade Col William Emerson	14th New Jersey: Cpt Jacob J. Janeway; 106th New York: Cpt Alvah W. Briggs (w), Cpt Peter Robertson; 151st New York: Cpt Browning N. Wiles (w), Cpt Hiram A. Kimball; 184th New York (battalion): Maj William D. Ferguson; 87th Pennsylvania (battalion): Cpt Edgar M. Ruhl (k), Cpt John A. Salsbury; 10th Vermont: Col William W. Henry (w), Cpt Henry H. Dewey
Third Division Col J. Warren Keifer	2nd Brigade Col William H. Ball	6th Maryland: Maj Joseph C. Hill; 9th New York Heavy Artillery: Maj James W. Snyder; 110th Ohio: Ltc Otho H. Binkley; 122nd Ohio: Ltc Moses M. Granger; 126th Ohio: Maj George W. Voorhes (w), Cpt George W. Hoge; 67th Pennsylvania: Lt John F. Young; 138th Pennsylvania: Maj Lewis A. May
Artillery Brigade Col Charles Henry Tompkins		5th Maine Light Artillery (Battery E): Cpt Greenlief T. Stevens; New York Light Artillery, 1st Battery: Lt Orsamus R. Van Etten; Battery C, 1st Rhode Island Light Artillery: Lt Jacob H. Lamb; Battery G, 1st Rhode Island Light Artillery: Cpt George W. Adams; Battery M, 5th U.S. Artillery: Cpt James McKnight

=== XIX Corps ===
BG William H. Emory

Division	Brigade	Regiments and Others
First Division BG James W. McMillan	1st Brigade Col Edwin P. Davis	29th Maine: Maj George H. Nye (w), Cpt Alfred L. Turner; 30th Massachusetts: Cpt Samuel D. Shipley; 90th New York: Ltc Nelson Shaurman (w), Cpt Honore De La Paturelle; 114th New York: Ltc Henry B. Morse; 116th New York: Col George M. Love; 153rd New York: Ltc Alexander Strain (w), Cpt George H. McLaughlin
First Division BG James W. McMillan	2nd Brigade Col Stephen Thomas	12th Connecticut: Ltc George N. Lewis; 160th New York: Cpt Henry P. Underhill; 47th Pennsylvania: Maj J. P. Shindel Gobin; 8th Vermont: Maj John B. Mead (w), Cpt Moses McFarland
First Division BG James W. McMillan	3rd Brigade Col Leonard D. H. Currie	30th Maine: Col Thomas H. Hubbard; 133rd New York: Maj Anthony J. Allaire; 162nd New York: Col Justus W. Blanchard; 165th New York (six companies): Ltc Gouverneur Carr; 173rd New York: Majr George W. Rogers
First Division BG James W. McMillan	Division Artillery	New York Light Artillery, 5th Battery: Cpt Elijah D. Taft
Second Division BG Cuvier Grover (w); BG Henry W. Birge	1st Brigade BG Henry W. Birge; Col Thomas W. Porter	9th Connecticut (battalion): Cpt John G. Healy; 12th Maine: Ltc Edwin Ilsley; 14th Maine: Ltc Charles S. Bickmore (k), Cpt John K. Laing; 26th Massachusetts (battalion): Lt John S. Cooke; 14th New Hampshire: Cpt Theodore A. Ripley (c), Cpt Oliver H. Marston; 75th New York: Maj Benjamin F. Thurber
Second Division BG Cuvier Grover (w); BG Henry W. Birge	2nd Brigade Col Edward L. Molineux	13th Connecticut: Col Charles D. Blinn; 11th Indiana: Ltc William W. Darnall; 22nd Iowa: Col Harvey Graham; 3rd Massachusetts Cavalry (dismounted): Col Lorenzo D. Sargent; 131st New York: Col Nicholas W. Day; 159th New York: Ltc William Waltermire
Second Division BG Cuvier Grover (w); BG Henry W. Birge	3rd Brigade Col Daniel Macauley (w); Ltc Alfred Neafie	38th Massachusetts: Maj Charles F. Allen; 128th New York: Cpt Charles R. Anderson; 156th New York: Ltc Alfred Neafie, Cpt Alfred Cooley; 175th New York (battalion): Cpt Charles McCarthey; 176th New York: Maj Charles Lewis
Second Division BG Cuvier Grover (w); BG Henry W. Birge	4th Brigade Col David Shunk	8th Indiana: Ltc Alexander J. Kenny (w), Maj John R. Polk; 18th Indiana: Ltc William S. Charles (w); 24th Iowa: Ltc John Q. Wilds (mw), Maj Edward Wright (w), Cpt Leander Clark; 28th Iowa: Ltc Bartholomew W. Wilson (w), Maj John Meyer
Second Division BG Cuvier Grover (w); BG Henry W. Birge	Division Artillery	1st Battery (A), Maine Light Artillery: Lt Eben D. Haley (w)
Reserve Artillery Maj Albert W. Bradbury		17th Battery, Indiana Light Artillery: Lt Hezekiah Hinkson; Battery D, 1st Rhode Island Light Artillery: Lt Frederick Chase

=== Army of West Virginia (VIII Corps) ===
BG George Crook

Division	Brigade	Regiments and Others
First Division Col Joseph Thoburn (k); Col Thomas M. Harris	1st Brigade Ltc Thomas F. Wildes	34th Massachusetts: Cpt Andrew Potter; 2nd Battalion, 5th New York Heavy Artillery: Cpt Frederick C. Wilkie; 116th Ohio: Cpt Wilbert B. Teters (w), Cpt John Hull; 123rd Ohio: Maj Horace Kellog
First Division Col Joseph Thoburn (k); Col Thomas M. Harris	2nd Brigade Colonel William B. Curtis	1st West Virginia: Ltc Jacob Weddle; 4th West Virginia: Cpt Benjamin D. Boswell; 12th West Virginia: Ltc Robert S. Northcott
First Division Col Joseph Thoburn (k); Col Thomas M. Harris	3rd Brigade Col Thomas M. Harris; Col Milton Wells (w)	23rd Illinois: Cpt Samuel A. Simison; 54th Pennsylvania: Cpt John Suter; 10th West Virginia: Ltc Moses S. Hall (w), Maj Henry H. Withers; 11th West Virginia: Ltc Van H. Bukey; 15th West Virginia: Col Milton Wells, Maj John W. Holliday
Second Division Col Rutherford B. Hayes	1st Brigade Col Hiram F. Devol	23rd Ohio: Ltc James M. Comly; 36th Ohio: Ltc William H. G. Adney; 5th West Virginia (battalion): Ltc William H. Enochs; 13th West Virginia: Col William R. Brown, Ltc James R. Hall
Second Division Col Rutherford B. Hayes	2nd Brigade Ltc Benjamin F. Coates	34th Ohio (battalion): Ltc Luther Furney; 91st Ohio: Maj Lemuel Z. Cadot; 9th West Virginia: Cpt John S. P. Carroll; 14th West Virginia: Maj Shriver Moore
Artillery	Artillery Brigade Cpt Henry A. du Pont	Battery L, 1st Ohio Light Artillery: Cpt Frank C. Gibbs; Battery D, 1st Pennsylvania Light Artillery: Lt William Munk; Battery B, 5th U.S. Artillery: Lt Henry F. Brewerton (w), Lt Charles Holman
Provisional Division Col J. Howard Kitching (mw); Col Wilhelm Heine	1st Brigade Col Wilhelm Heine; Ltc Thompson D. Hart	6th New York Heavy Artillery: Maj Edward Jones (mw); 103rd New York Infantry: Maj Joseph Morrison; 104th Pennsylvania Infantry: Cpt Theophiles Kephart
Provisional Division Col J. Howard Kitching (mw); Col Wilhelm Heine	2nd Brigade Ltc G. DePeyster Arden	41st New York Infantry: Ltc Detleo Von Einseidel; 10th New York Heavy Artillery: Ltc DePeyster Arden

=== Cavalry Corps ===
BG Alfred T. A. Torbert

Escort: 1st Rhode Island: Maj William H. Turner, jr.

Division	Brigade	Regiments and Others
First Division BG Wesley Merritt	1st Brigade: Michigan Brigade Col James H. Kidd	1st Michigan Cavalry: Cpt Andrew W. Duggan; 5th Michigan Cavalry: Maj Smith H. Hastings; 6th Michigan Cavalry: Maj Charles W. Deane; 7th Michigan Cavalry: Maj Daniel H. Darling; New York Light Artillery, 6th Battery: Cpt Joseph W. Martin
First Division BG Wesley Merritt	2nd Brigade Col Thomas C. Devin	4th New York Cavalry: Maj Edward Schwartz; 6th New York Cavalry: Cpt George E. Farmer; 9th New York Cavalry: Col George S. Nichols; 19th New York Cavalry (1st New York Dragoons): Col Alfred Gibbs; Batteries K & L, 1st US Artillery: Lt Franck E. Taylor
First Division BG Wesley Merritt	Reserve Brigade Col Charles Russell Lowell (mw); Ltc Caspar Crowninshield	2nd Massachusetts Cavalry: Ltc Caspar Crowninshield, Cpt Archibald McKendry; 1st U.S. Cavalry: Cpt Eugene M. Baker; 2nd U.S. Cavalry: Cpt Robert S. Smith; 5th U.S. Cavalry: Lt Gustavus Urban
Second Division Col William H. Powell	1st Brigade Col Alpheus S. Moore	8th Ohio Cavalry (detachment): Col Samuel A. Gilbert; 14th Pennsylvania Cavalry: Maj Thomas Gibson; 22nd Pennsylvania Cavalry: Ltc Andrew J. Greenfield
Second Division Col William H. Powell	2nd Brigade Col Henry Capehart	1st New York Cavalry: Maj Timothy Quinn; 1st West Virginia Cavalry: Maj Harvey Farabee; 2nd West Virginia Cavalry: Ltc John J. Hoffman; 3rd West Virginia Cavalry: Ltc John L. McGee
Second Division Col William H. Powell	Division Artillery	Battery L, 5th U.S. Artillery: Lt Gulian V. Weir
Third Division BG George Armstrong Custer	1st Brigade Col Alexander Cummings McWhorter Pennington, Jr.	1st Connecticut Cavalry: Cpt Edwin W. French; 3rd New Jersey Cavalry: Ltc Charles C. Suydam; 2nd New York Cavalry: Cpt Andrew S. Glover; 5th New York Cavalry: Maj Abram H. Krom; 2nd Ohio Cavalry: Ltc George A. Purington; 18th Pennsylvania Cavalry: Maj John W. Phillips
Third Division BG George Armstrong Custer	2nd Brigade Col William Wells	3rd Indiana Cavalry (two companies): Lt Benjamin F. Gilbert; 1st New Hampshire Cavalry (battalion): Col John L. Thompson; 8th New York Cavalry: Ltc William H. Benjamin; 22nd New York Cavalry: Maj Charles C. Brown; 1st Vermont Cavalry: Ltc John W. Bennett
Horse Artillery		Batteries B & L, 2nd U.S. Artillery: Cpt Charles H. Peirce; Batteries C, F & K, 3rd U.S. Artillery: Cpt Dunbar R. Ransom
