= 23rd New Jersey Infantry Regiment =

- Flag of New Jersey
- Active: September 13, 1862, to June 27, 1863
- Country: United States of America
- Allegiance: Union
- Branch: Union Army
- Type: Infantry
- Engagements: Fredericksburg, and Battle of Salem Church

The 23rd New Jersey Infantry Regiment was an American Civil War infantry regiment from New Jersey that served a nine-month enlistment in the Union Army.

The 23rd New Jersey Infantry Regiment was recruited from various towns within Burlington County, New Jersey, and was mustered into Federal service in August 1862.The regiment trained at Camp Cadwalader in Beverly, before being sent out to join the Army of the Potomac. There, it was brigaded with the New Jersey units that made up the famed "First New Jersey Brigade", which had been reduced to a shadow of its former self due to continual field service and participation in the Battles of Gaines Mill, Second Bull Run, and South Mountain. The arrival of the nearly 1,000-strong 23rd New Jersey and the newly recruited three-year 15th New Jersey Volunteer Infantry greatly replenished the brigade's numbers.

When the 23rd New Jersey's first commander, Colonel John S. Cox, resigned to prevent a court-martial for drunkenness in November 1862, the new commander, Col. Henry O. Ryerson (the former Lieutenant Colonel of the 2nd New Jersey Volunteer Infantry), reviewed the regiment, and disparagingly called them "Yahoos", due to their less than military demeanor and irreverence. The men of the regiment took to the sobriquet, emblazoning it on their regimental flag, and called themselves Yahoos for the rest of their lives.

The regiment fought in two engagements–the December 1862 Battle of Fredericksburg, and the May 1863 Battle of Salem Church. Years after the war was over, the regiment erected a monument—the only one ever erected for a nine-month New Jersey unit—on the Salem Church battlefield, where it stands today. In that engagement, it was led by Col. Edward Burd Grubb, Jr., who took over command when Colonel Ryerson left to lead the 10th New Jersey Volunteer Infantry in March 1863.

After serving its nine-month enlistment, the regiment was mustered out in June 1863. Many of the veterans of the 23rd New Jersey went on to serve in other regiments, most notably the 34th New Jersey Volunteer Infantry, which is attributed to the fact that Colonel Grubb, much respected by the Yahoos, was rumored to be the commander of the unit (he in fact went on to command the 37th New Jersey Volunteer Infantry instead)

Captain Forrester L. Taylor, commander of Company H, rescued two wounded soldiers while under intense fire from the Confederates during the Salem Church engagement, an act of bravery that would get him awarded the Medal of Honor. This made him one of only two men from New Jersey's 11 nine-month enlistment regiments to be awarded that high honor (the other being Sergeant Major Amos J. Cummings of the 26th New Jersey Volunteer Infantry).

== Original Field and Staff ==
Mustered in September 1862:

- Colonel John S. Cox
- Lieutenant Colonel George C. Brown
- major Alfred Thompson
- Adjutant William G. Winans
- Quartermaster Abel H. Nichols
- Surgeon William Cook
- Assistant Surgeon David G. Hetzell
- Assistant Surgeon Robert T. Elmer
- Chaplain William T. Abbott.
- Sergeant Major John F. Mckee

...

== Original company commanders ==
- Company A - Captain Francis W. Milnor
- Company B - Captain Francis J. Higgins
- Company C - Captain Samuel Carr
- Company D - Captain Reading Newbold
- Company E - Captain Augustus W. Grobler
- Company F - Captain Samuel B. Smith
- Company G - Captain Joseph R. Ridgway
- Company H - Captain Henry A. McCabe
- Company I - Captain John P. Burnett
- Company K - Captain William J. Parmentier

== See also ==
- List of New Jersey Civil War Units
