= Battle of Cedar Creek order of battle =

The order of battle for the Battle of Cedar Creek (also known as the Battle of Belle Grove) includes:

- Battle of Cedar Creek order of battle: Confederate
- Battle of Cedar Creek order of battle: Union

== See also ==
- Battle of Cedar Creek (disambiguation)
