= Fort Kearny (disambiguation) =

Fort Kearny may refer to:

- Fort Kearny, a historic fort in Nebraska
- Fort Phil Kearny, a historic fort in Wyoming
- Fort Kearny (Washington, D.C.), a historic fort in Washington, D.C.
- Fort Kearny (Rhode Island), a historic fort in Narragansett, Rhode Island (often misspelled Fort Kearney)
- Camp Kearny, a former military installation in Linda Vista, California
