= Forrester L. Taylor =

Forrester Lore Taylor
- Forrester Lore Taylor, Medal of Honor recipient
- Born: October 30, 1833; Philadelphia, Pennsylvania, US
- Died: April 21, 1907 (aged 73); Rustburg, Virginia, US
- Burial place: Rustburg, Virginia
- Military career
- Allegiance: United States of America; Union
- Branch: United States Army; Union Army
- Service years: 1862-1864
- Rank: Brevet Major
- Units: Company H, 23rd New Jersey Volunteer Infantry
- Conflicts: American Civil War
- Awards: Medal of Honor

Forrester Lore Taylor (October 30, 1833 – April 21, 1907) was an officer in the Union Army during the American Civil War who received the Medal of Honor for his bravery at the May 3, 1863 Battle of Salem Church.

== Early years and education ==
Born in Philadelphia, Pennsylvania, he was a member of a Burlington, New Jersey militia company at the start of the Civil War. In July 1862, President Abraham Lincoln enacted legislation that called for established militia units to be called into Federal service for a period of nine months.

== Military career ==
Forrester Taylor's unit was recruited up to the strength of a standard Union Army infantry company, and it was mustered into service as Company A of the 23rd New Jersey Volunteer Infantry, with Taylor becoming a sergeant on September 13, 1862. He served in this duty as the regiment was brigaded with the Army of the Potomac's First New Jersey Brigade in October 1862, and fought in the December 1862 Battle of Fredericksburg, where the 23rd New Jersey performed rather well for a green, untested unit, and took a number of casualties. The battle, however, was an unequivocal Union defeat, and the 23rd New Jersey, with the rest of the beaten army, limped into winter quarters to await the spring after the engagement.

While in that period of inactivity, Forrester Taylor was promoted three times: December 26, 1862 to second lieutenant of Company G, February 13, 1863 to first lieutenant of Company D, and April 18, 1863 to captain and commander of Company H. He was in command of his company during the May 1863 Chancellorsville Campaign, which featured an attack of the First New Jersey Brigade on Confederate positions in and around Salem Church, just west of the town of Fredericksburg, Virginia. The brigade encountered the rebel forces in strong defensive positions and superior numbers, and eventually retreated with a great number of casualties. In that retreat, Captain Taylor twice braved intense enemy gunfire to save wounded comrades, and was almost killed himself by friendly Union artillery fire. His act was recognized over 33 years later, when, on November 2, 1896, he was awarded the Medal of Honor for his bravery (his official citation reads simply "At great risk voluntarily saved the lives of and brought from the battlefield two wounded comrades").

His enlistment expired on June 27, 1863, and he was mustered out in Trenton, New Jersey. Still feeling a sense of duty, he re-enlisted in the newly raised 34th New Jersey Volunteer Infantry (which contained a large number of former members of the 23rd New Jersey), and was commissioned as Captain and commander of the unit's Company H on October 6, 1863. He would see garrison and occupation duty in Kentucky and Tennessee with the 34th New Jersey until he was discharged on December 2, 1864. On March 13, 1865 he received the brevet promotion of Major, United States Volunteers "for gallant conduct at the battle of Chancellorsville, Va."

== Post war life and death ==
After the war he resided in Virginia, where he lived on a farm known as the "Sweeney Plantation", the site of a former tavern south of Lynchburg in Lawyers, Campbell County, Virginia. He was buried on the farm in his family's cemetery in what is now Rustburg, Virginia. From the year 1988, his final resting site was unmarked, but was rededicated with a new US government-issue white marble headstone on April 22, 2007.

== Medal of Honor citation ==
Rank and organization: Captain, Company H, 23d New Jersey Infantry. Place and date: At Chancellorsville. Va., May 3, 1863. Entered service at: ------. Birth: Philadelphia, Pa. Date of issue: November 2, 1896.

Citation:

At great risk voluntarily saved the lives of and brought from the battlefield 2 wounded comrades.

== See also ==
- List of Medal of Honor recipients
- List of American Civil War Medal of Honor recipients: T–Z
