= Edward L. Campbell =

American colonel

Edward Livingston Campbell
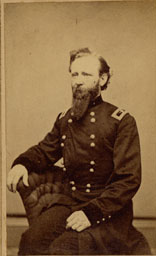
- Born: February 2, 1833; Belvidere, New Jersey, U.S.
- Died: December 27, 1913 (aged 80); Trinidad, Colorado, U.S.
- Burial place: Masonic Cemetery, Trinidad, Colorado, United States
- Education: Lafayette College
- Military career
- Allegiance: United States (Union)
- Branch: United States Army (Union Army)
- Service years: 1861–1865
- Rank: Colonel; Bvt. Brigadier General
- Commands: 4th New Jersey Infantry Regiment
- Conflicts: American Civil War; Manassas campaign; First Battle of Bull Run; Maryland campaign; Battle of Antietam (WIA); Shenandoah Valley Campaign; Third Battle of Winchester; Battle of Fisher's Hill; Battle of Cedar Creek (WIA)

Edward Livingston Campbell (1833-1913) was an American Brevet Brigadier General who commanded the 15th New Jersey Infantry Regiment and the 4th New Jersey Infantry Regiment throughout several battles of the Shenandoah Valley Campaign during the American Civil War.

== American Civil War ==
When the American Civil War broke out, Campbell helped muster the 3rd New Jersey Infantry Regiment and was appointed as captain of Company E of the regiment as he commanded the Company throughout the First Battle of Bull Run before the 3rd New Jersey was merged into the First New Jersey Brigade. On August 13, 1862, Campbell was transferred to the 15th New Jersey Infantry Regiment and was made Lieutenant Colonel of the regiment before being wounded at the Battle of Antietam. In September 1864, he was made the main commander of the First New Jersey Brigade and commanded it throughout the battles of 3rd Winchester, Fisher's Hill, and Cedar Creek although he was wounded in the latter.

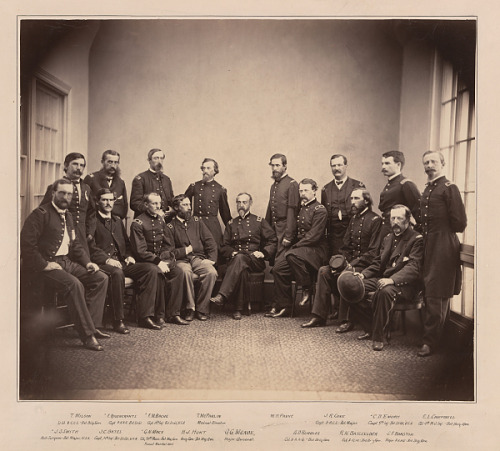
Campbell in George Meade's staff

Around the conclusion of the war, Campbell served within George Meade's staff as the Acting Judge Advocate. He was promoted to colonel on October 19, 1864, and brevetted brigadier general on April 9, 1865, for "gallant and meritorious services during the recent operations resulting in the fall of Richmond, Va., and the surrender of the insurgent army under General Robert E. Lee". He was then given command of the 4th New Jersey Infantry Regiment on May 29, 1865, before being honorably mustered out on July 9 in the same year.

== Later years ==
Campbell initially returned to Trenton, New Jersey before moving to Trinidad, Colorado. Campbell died on December 27, 1913, and was buried at the Masonic Cemetery at Trinidad.
