= Theodore A. Ripley =

American general (1835–1866)

Theodore Alexander Ripley
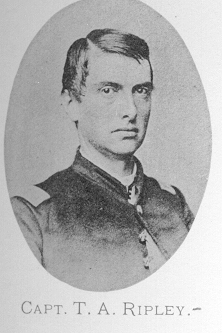
- Born: December 23, 1835; Winchester, New Hampshire, U.S.
- Died: July 24, 1866 (aged 30); Emanuel County, Georgia, U.S.
- Burial place: Evergreen Cemetery, Winchester, New Hampshire, U.S.
- Spouse: Harriet Sophia Fulham (m. 1857–1866)
- Military career
- Allegiance: United States (Union)
- Branch: United States Army (Union Army)
- Rank: Colonel; Bvt. Brigadier General
- Conflicts: American Civil War: Shenandoah Valley campaign; Battle of Cedar Creek

Theodore Alexander Ripley (1835–1866) was an American Brevet Brigadier General who participated in the American Civil War. He commanded the 14th New Hampshire Infantry Regiment throughout its entire creation and disbandment. Ripley was also known for his murder by the Ku Klux Klan that took place at Emanuel County, Georgia after being discharged from military service and moving there after the war.

== Early years ==
Theodore Alexander Ripley was born on December 23, 1835. Prior to the war, Ripley was a merchant at New York City and married Harriet Sophia Fulham on July 9, 1857.

== American Civil War ==
On October 2, 1862, Ripley enlisted into the 14th New Hampshire Infantry Regiment as a Captain within Company F. At the Battle of Cedar Creek, Ripley was captured during the battle and was imprisoned at Libby Prison until his exchange in March 1865, having endured the many abuses there. Ripley was then brevetted Brigadier General on March 13, 1865, and promoted to full colonel on March 29 before being discharged on late May 1865.

== Murder ==
After the war, Ripley was in a partnership that established the firm of Ripley, Barker and Flanders in Washington, D.C. which aimed to help former soldiers and sailors to obtain back pay, pensions and bounties during their service. He continued his business by gaining some real estate in Virginia as well as fully relocating the firm down south to Georgia with his first documented visit being in January 1866. He fully settled into Emanuel County, Georgia and started many businesses there until he formed a partnership with George O. Marcy who was a veteran of the 1st Connecticut Cavalry Regiment. They then gained a plantation by the Ogeechee River as Ripley served as superintendent of the plantation and building up his partnership with Marcy's lumber company. While most Northern landowners in the southern states were generally disliked and unwanted among the populace, Ripley was on friendly terms with his neighbors and customers.

Ripley found himself the victim of several horse and mule robberies as one of the earliest cases of this was at late summer or early fall of 1865 as three South Carolinian men who were possibly affiliated with the Ku Klux Klan known as Henry Padgett, Henry Hodge and John Pryer, stole some of his horses and mules but Ripley and other employees managed to catch the thieves and had them arrested at Savannah jail until their release of Summer 1866. The thieves wanted revenge on Ripley as they enacted it on the night of July 23, 1866, heading directly for his home. They told a household servant that they needed to have a talk with Ripley at his front gate and after they refused an offer of discussing matters within inside, Ripley went outside to meet with one of the members. He then proclaimed “Colonel Ripley, you are my prisoner!” but Ripley drew his revolver and shot at the man, causing him to flee immediately afterwards. The other members hid in the dark and began firing at Ripley with four bullets hitting Ripley and causing him to retreat back to his house. Harriet tried her best to treat his wounds and pleaded with the three men to allow a doctor to attend her dying husband but they refused, even preventing her from drawing water from the well in a last ditch effort to treat him. Ripley died on the early morning on July 24, 1866, dying at Harriet's arms. Satisfied, the three men left the house and hid back in the darkness. After a few months, all three men were arrested along with Daniel Coleman and his son, Thornton were also indicted for the crime but the latter two were then cleared of the crimes in September 1866 while the former three's sentence remains unknown.

== See also ==
- List of American Civil War brevet generals (Union)
