= 15th New Jersey Infantry Regiment =

15th New Jersey Volunteer Infantry Regiment
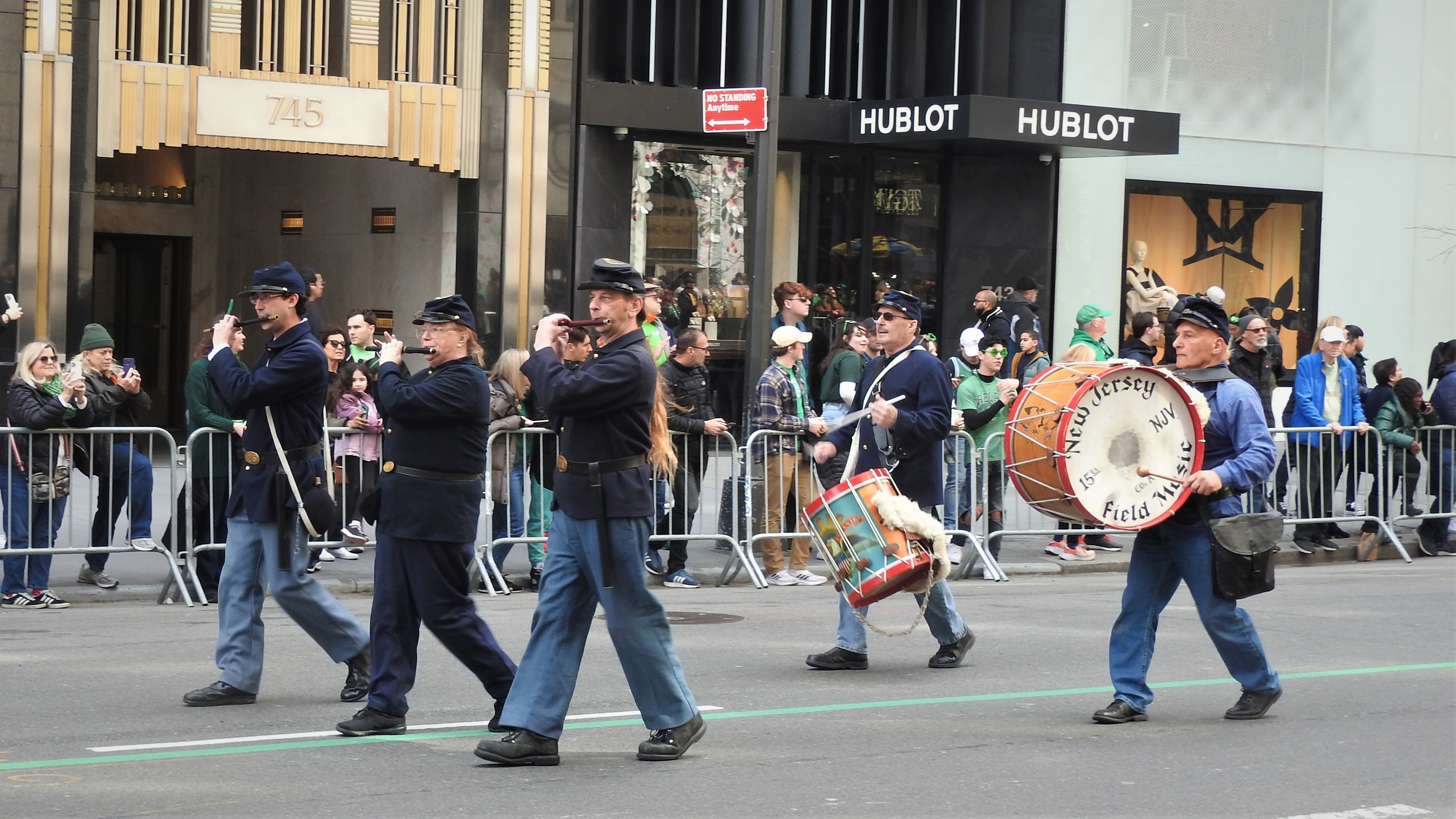
- Active: August 1862 - 1865
- Country: United States
- Allegiance: Union
- Branch: Infantry
- Engagements: Battle of Fredericksburg; Battle of Chancellorsville; Battle of Gettysburg; Battle of the Wilderness; Battle of Spotsylvania; Battle of North Anna; Battle of Cold Harbor; Siege of Petersburg; Shenandoah Valley Campaign

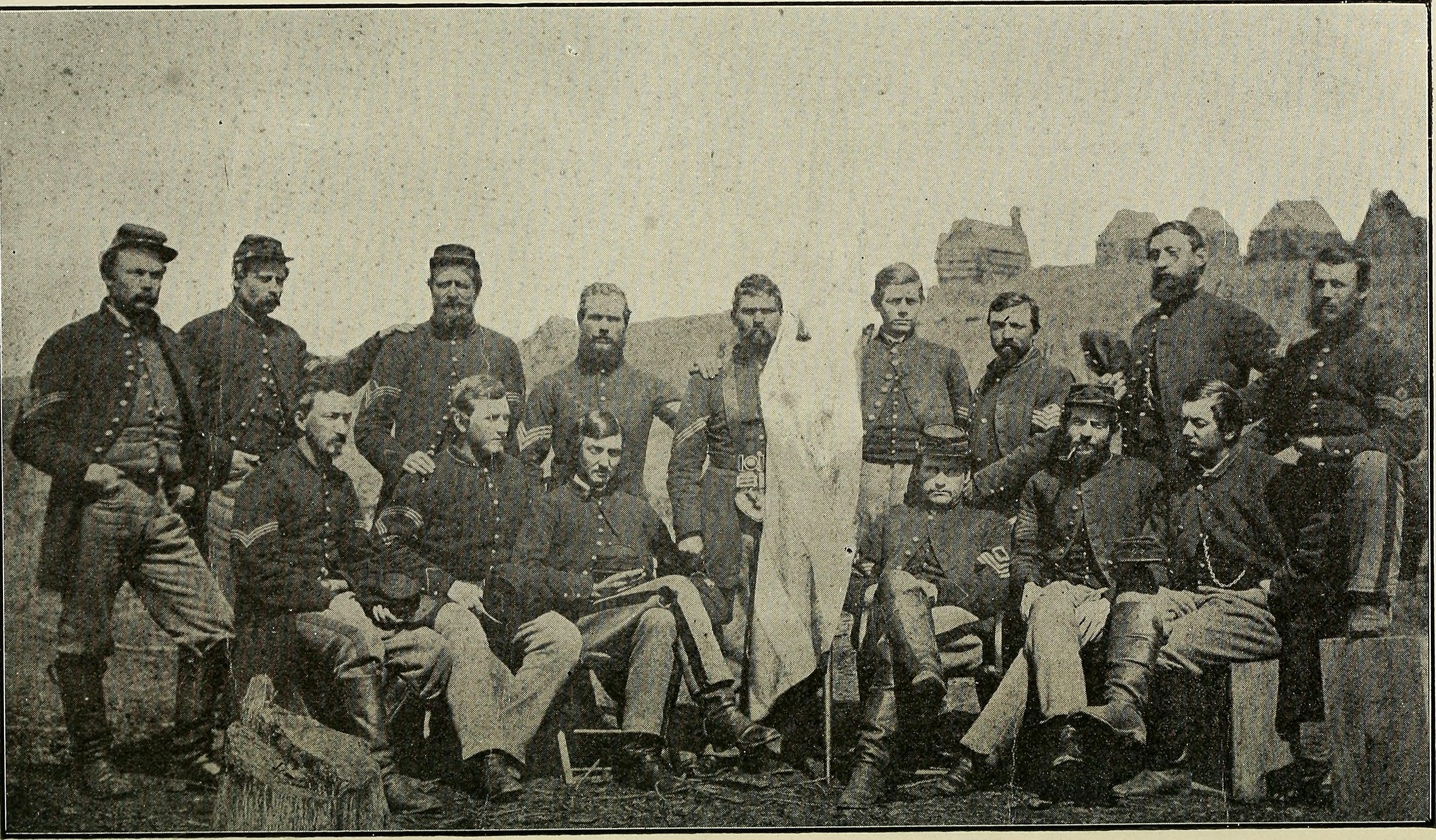
Noncommissioned staff of the 15th New Jersey Volunteers, 1864

The 15th New Jersey Volunteer Infantry Regiment was an American Civil War infantry regiment from New Jersey that served from September 1862 through 1865 in the Union Army.

The 15th New Jersey Volunteer Infantry Regiment was organized at Flemington, New Jersey, in July and August 1862. Three companies were recruited in Sussex County (D, I & K), two in Warren (B & H), two in Hunterdon (A & G), two in Morris (C & F) and one in Somerset (E), and all were composed of men of superior physical strength and capacities of endurance. The regiment was mustered into the United States services on the 25th of August and on the 27th left for Washington, numbering nine hundred and twenty-five officers and men, Colonel Samuel Fowler commanding. Reaching the Capital it encamped at Tennallytown, where it remained for about a month, engaged in drill and acquiring discipline for future service. While here, the men were also employed upon the defenses of Washington, slashing timber, making military roads, and throwing up earthworks - Fort Kearny being constructed entirely by their labor.

== Original regimental commanders ==
The following officers led the regiment at the outset. Staff officers, including the Colonel, were generally listed under Company S. Unassigned replacements were listed under Company U.

- Colonel Samuel Fowler
- Lieutenant Colonel Edward L. Campbell
- Major James M. Brown
- Adjutant William P. Peymour
- Quartermaster Lowe Emerson
- Surgeon Redford Sharp
- Assistant Surgeon George R. Sullivan
- Assistant Surgeon George Trumpore
- Chaplain Alanson A. Haines

== Original company commanders ==
- Company A - Captain Lambert Boeman
  - First Lieutenant Thomas P. Stout
  - Second Lieutenant John R. Emery
- Company B - Captain Alfred S. Burt
  - First Lieutenant Charles M. Fairelo
  - Second Lieutenant Charles R. Paul
- Company C - Captain Ira J. Lindsely
  - First Lieutenant Erastus H. Taylor
  - Second Lieutenant Samuel R. Connett
- Company D - Captain James Walker
  - First Lieutenant Lewis Van Blarcom
  - Second Lieutenant James S. MacDanolds
- Company E - Captain John H. Vanderveer
  - First Lieutenant Stephen H. Bogardus
  - Second Lieutenant Ellis Hamilton
- Company F - Captain George C. King
  - First Lieutenant Owen H. Day
  - Second Lieutenant John H. Vanderveer
- Company G - Captain William H. Slater
  - First Lieutenant Henry S. Crater
  - Second Lieutenant John D. Trimmer
- Company H - Captain Andrew J. Wright
  - First Lieutenant William D. Cornish
  - Second Lieutenant James Bentley
- Company I - Captain James H Simpson
  - First Lieutenant Cornelius C. Shimer
  - Second Lieutenant William W. Van Voy
- Company K - Captain George W. Hamilton
  - First Lieutenant William H. Edsall
  - Second Lieutenant John Fowler

== First enlistment ==
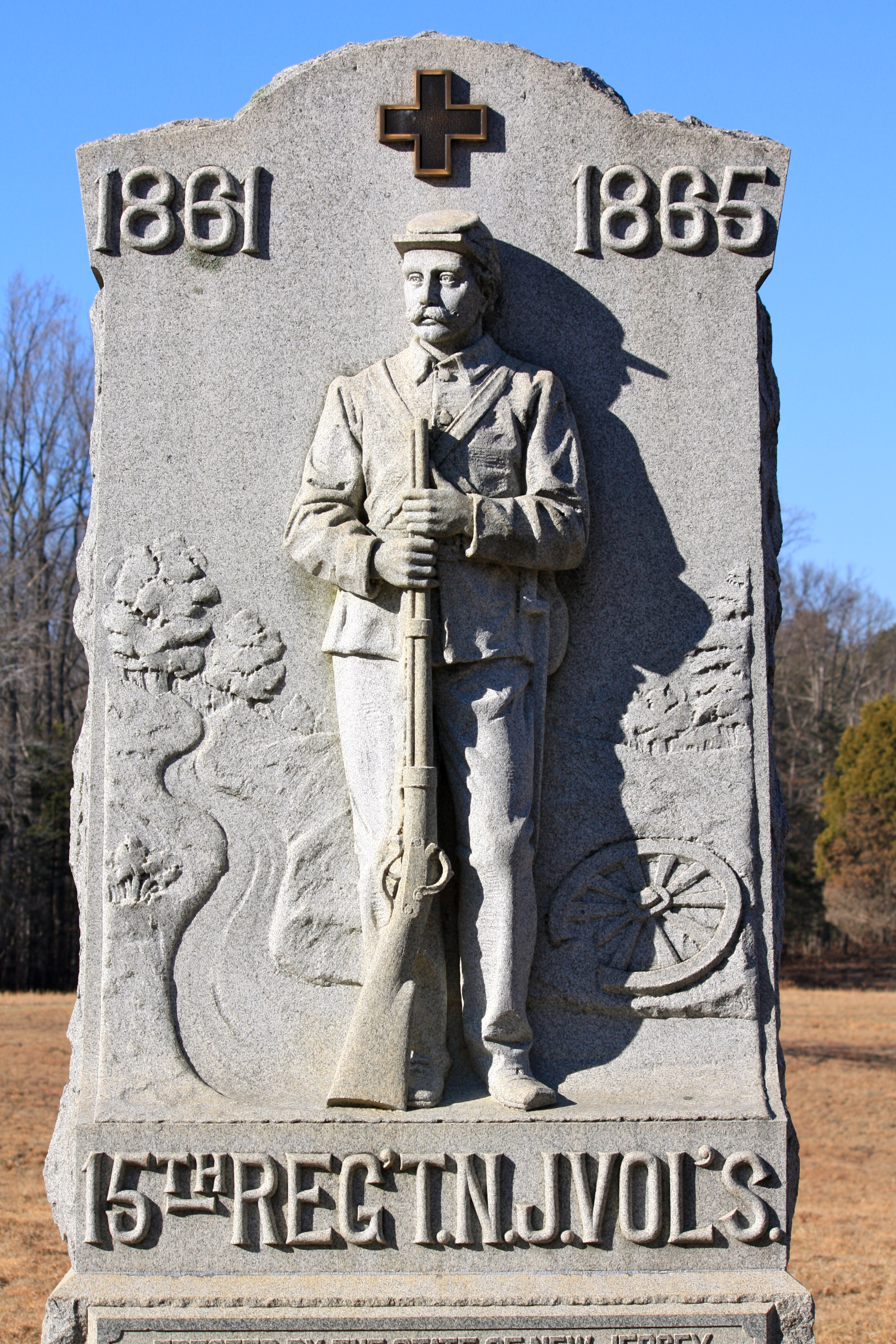
A monument dedicated to the 15th New Jersey Volunteer Infantry at the Spotsylvania Courthouse Battlefield

By the time the 15th was formed all regiments were created for 3 years service. Most would reenlist to become "Veteran" regiments when and if their time came.

- December 11–15, 1862 - Battle of Fredericksburg
- April 30 - May 6, 1863 - Battle of Chancellorsville
- July 1–3, 1863 - Battle of Gettysburg, but the regiment was not actively engaged
- July 5–24, 1863 - Pursuit of Lee to Manassas Gap
  - July 5, 1863 - Fairfield, Pennsylvania
  - July 10–13, 1863 - At and near Funkstown, Maryland
- May 5–7, 1864 - Battle of the Wilderness
- May 8–12, 1864 - Spotsylvania
  - May 12 - Assault on the Salient (the "Bloody Angle")
- May 12–21, 1864 - Spottsylvania Court House
- May 23–26, 1864 - Battle of North Anna
- June 1–12, 1864 - Battle of Cold Harbor
- June 17–22, 1864 - Before Petersburg, Virginia
- August 7-November 28 - Shenandoah Valley Campaign

== Statistics ==
This regiment suffered higher casualties than any other infantry regiment from New Jersey. At Spotsylvania, the Jersey Brigade of Wright's Division was engaged in a deadly struggle, the percentage of killed in the 15th New Jersey being equaled in only one instance during the whole war.

- Officers killed or wounded: 8
- Officers died of disease, etc.: 1
- Enlisted men killed or wounded: 239
- Enlisted men died of disease, etc.: 98
- Other: 15

== Commanders ==
- Colonel Samuel Fowler (resigned, March 1863)
- Colonel William H. Penrose

== Personal Stories ==
Personal stories of individual officers or enlisted men should be added to this section in alphabetical order.

=== Kelsey, William (PVT) ===
William Kelsey was born in Newton, Sussex County, NJ in December 1844, and was orphaned at a young age. He was working as a farm hand in Lafayette Township when he enlisted as a drummer boy in Company D in July 1862. On June 16, 1863, on the march to the Potomac, just as the order came to fall in line, a stack of arms fell, and the bullet from a musket exploded and struck William C Kelsey in the neck. At first it was thought the carotid artery was cut and he asked the Doctor “Am I dying?” The answer came “You’ll be dead in less than 15 minutes”. He asked for the chaplain and the Rev. Haines was called and prayed earnestly with him while one of the Surgeons thrust his fingers full length into the wound. The Surgeon called for a roll of lint and a roll of linen threads had been brought that had been picked and sent by some school girls in New York. This was rolled into a plug and forced into the wound. He was conveyed to a tent of some Calvary videlles, where he was left temporarily. To the surprise of all, he reached Washington alive and later transferred to the invalid corps. While recuperating, he was made Assistant, Past Master at York, Penn. He was mustered out on May 30, 1865. He later moved to Brooklyn, NY, where he worked as a chemist (pharmacist), then to Sag Harbor, NY. He and his family eventually settled in Amagansett, NY, joining two fellow soldiers who were Amagansett natives: (Sgt) Lodowick H. King (Co. I) and Marcus Barnes Duvall (Co. E). King and Duvall had joined the 15th New Jersey along with Chaplain Alanson A. Haines, a New Jersey native who was a pastor in Amagansett at the start of the war. Kelsey died in Amagansett on December 6, 1916, and is buried in East End Cemetery.

=== Losey, Peter (PVT) ===
Peter Losey was an unmarried farmer in Stillwater Township, Sussex County, New Jersey, when he enlisted at Newton. He served in Company I from first muster on August 11, 1862, until his capture on May 4, 1864, during the Battle of the Wilderness. By July 16 he was at Andersonville where he remained until he was released to the Union with others who were too ill matter. That is, he was too far gone to recover. He was exchanged on November 30 at Savannah, Georgia, and taken to Annapolis where he died of chronic diarrhea on December 20, 1864. Private Peter Losey (no. 287) was buried at U. S. Cemetery Annapolis in 259 Ash Grove.

== See also ==
- List of New Jersey Civil War Units
