= Terrence Begley =

Union Army Medal of Honor recipient

- Born: 1843 or 1844; Ireland
- Died: August 25, 1864; Dinwiddie County, Virginia
- Burial place: Unknown; likely at Poplar Grove National Cemetery
- Military career
- Allegiance: United States of America
- Branch: United States Army; Union Army
- Service years: 1864
- Rank: Sergeant
- Unit: (New York (state)) 7th Regiment New York Volunteer Heavy Artillery - Company D
- Conflicts: Battle of Spotsylvania Court House; Battle of North Anna; Battle of Cold Harbor; Second Battle of Ream's Station
- Awards: Medal of Honor; Civil War Campaign Medal

Sergeant Terrence Begley (died 25 August 1864) was an Irish soldier who fought in the American Civil War. Begley was awarded the United States' highest award for bravery during combat, the Medal of Honor, for his action during the Battle of Cold Harbor in Cold Harbor, Virginia on 3 June 1864. He was honored posthumously with the award on 1 December 1864.

== Biography ==
Begley was born in Ireland and enlisted at age 20 in the Army from Albany, New York in February 1864. Begley was killed in combat during the Second Battle of Ream's Station at Reams Station, Virginia on 25 August 1864, just two months after the actions that led to his Medal of Honor award. A cenotaph was placed in his honor at Albany Rural Cemetery, New York in 2021.

== Medal of Honor citation ==
Shot a Confederate color bearer, 26th Virginia Infantry, rushed forward and seized his colors, and although exposed to heavy fire, regained the lines in safety.

== See also ==
- List of American Civil War Medal of Honor recipients: A–F
