= First New Jersey Brigade =

The First New Jersey Brigade (also called the First Jersey Brigade and Kearny's New Jersey Brigade) is the common name for an American Civil War brigade of New Jersey infantry regiments in the Union Army of the Potomac. Its official designation through most of its service was as the 1st Brigade, 1st Division, VI Corps.

== Beginnings and early service ==
Through the course of the Civil War, the brigade was composed entirely of units from New Jersey, the only Union brigade during the war to be constituted as such. Its origins were on May 4, 1861, when New Jersey was directed by the Federal government to fill a quota of three infantry regiments to serve a three-year term of enlistment. Recruitment took place for the new regiments all over the state, and on May 21, 1861, the 1st New Jersey Volunteer Infantry was mustered into the Union Army at Camp Olden in Trenton, New Jersey, under Maj. Theodore T. S. Laidley of the United States Regular Army. The 1st New Jersey was then followed into Federal service by the 2nd New Jersey Volunteer Infantry (May 28, 1861) and the 3rd New Jersey Volunteer Infantry.

On June 28, 1861, the three newly created three-year regiments began the journey to Virginia, where in June they were joined with a brigade of three-month enlistment New Jersey Militia regiments to form a division commanded by Brig. Gen. Theodore Runyon. This was the first time the New Jersey regiments officially formed the brigade. During the First Bull Run Campaign, most of the brigade saw service in the field guarding train hubs, supply depots and roadways, being considered too "green" to be reliable in combat. However, a few companies of the 1st and 2nd New Jersey Infantries were directed to help stem the retreat at Centreville, Virginia, after the Confederates routed General Irvin McDowell's forces at Manassas, Virginia, on July 21, 1861. They were unsuccessful, and many officers and men retreated in the rout as well.

In August 1861, the 4th New Jersey Volunteer Infantry was recruited and added to the First New Jersey Brigade after its muster into service. From that point on, the four regiments and their later remnants would serve together until the end of the war and their final discharge.

== Later service ==
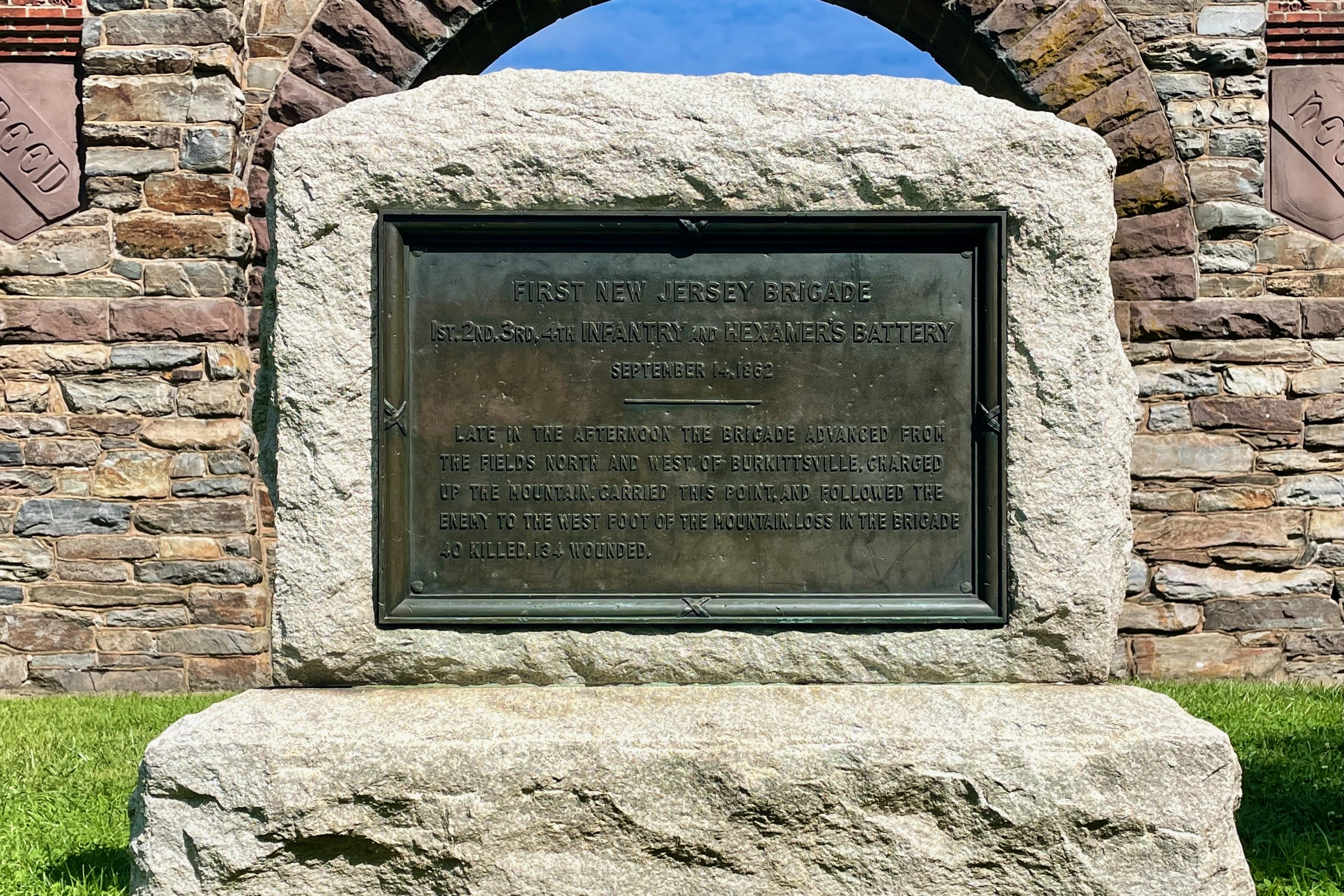
First New Jersey Brigade Monument at Crampton's Gap

As the war progressed, more regiments were added to the brigade, but in keeping with its tradition, they were New Jersey units. In September 1862, the nine-month enlistment unit 23rd New Jersey Volunteer Infantry and the three-year 15th New Jersey Volunteer Infantry were added, with the 23rd New Jersey serving until June 1863 and the 15th New Jersey serving until the end of the war. On April 19, 1864, the 10th New Jersey Volunteer Infantry "Olden's Legion" was added. In March 1865 the 40th New Jersey Volunteer Infantry—the last raised by the state—was brigaded with the original units.

The brigade saw its first pitched battle rather late, as it fought in the June 27, 1862, Battle of Gaines' Mill during the Seven Days Battles. There it sustained heavy casualties, with most of the 4th New Jersey being captured by Confederate forces. The 4th New Jersey's men were subsequently released in a prisoner exchange and returned to their lines, but they lost the Model 1861 Springfield Rifles they'd been carrying. Since none were available to rearm the regiment, they were issued old .69 caliber smoothbore muskets. It then fought in the Second Bull Run Campaign, where it blundered into the entire Confederate army corps commanded by Major General Stonewall Jackson, and at Crampton's Gap during the Battle of South Mountain, where it redeemed its honor by making a triumphant charge up the hill. The 4th New Jersey managed to reequip itself with .58 caliber rifles dropped by the Confederates. Later engagements included Fredericksburg, Chancellorsville, Gettysburg, the Wilderness, Spotsylvania, Cold Harbor, Strasburg, Fisher's Hill, and Cedar Creek.

== Regiments ==
First New Jersey Infantry
Service in brigade: June 1861 – June 3, 1864
153 killed or died of wounds and 99 died of disease or accidents

Second New Jersey Infantry
Service in brigade: June 1861 – May 21, 1864
96 killed or died of wounds and 69 died of disease or accidents

Third New Jersey Infantry
Service in brigade: June 1861 – June 3, 1864
157 killed or died of wounds and 81 died of disease or accidents

Fourth New Jersey Infantry
Service in brigade: June 1861 – June 22, 1865
161 killed or died of wounds and 105 died of disease or accidents

Tenth New Jersey Infantry "Olden Legion"
Service in brigade: April 19, 1864 – June 22, 1865
93 killed or died of wounds and 190 Died of disease or accidents

Fifteenth New Jersey Infantry "Fighting Fifteenth"
Service in brigade: September 30, 1862 – June 22, 1865
240 killed or died of wounds and 132 died of disease or accidents.

Twenty-Third New Jersey Infantry
Service in brigade: October 8, 1862 – June 27, 1863
35 killed or died of wounds and 55 died of disease or accidents

Fortieth New Jersey Infantry
Service in brigade: February 2, 1865 – July 13, 1865
2 killed or died of wounds and 17 died of disease or accidents

== Commanders ==
The brigade's first commander was Brig. Gen. Philip Kearny, whose training and discipline molded the regiments into an effective fighting unit. He was succeeded by George W. Taylor, who was colonel of the 3rd New Jersey Infantry. Taylor was promoted to brigadier general soon after assuming command of the brigade. After being mortally wounded at the Second Battle of Bull Run, the leadership of the brigade went to Alfred Thomas Torbert, who was serving as colonel of the 1st New Jersey Infantry. Subsequent commanders were Col. Henry Brown (3rd New Jersey), Col. William H. Penrose (15th New Jersey), and Cpt. Baldwin Hufty (4th New Jersey).

== Medal of Honor recipients ==
Six soldiers from the First New Jersey Brigade received the Medal of Honor for bravery:

- 1st Lieutenant William Brant, Jr. – 1st New Jersey Veterans Battalion
- Corporal Charles Ferren Hopkins – 1st New Jersey Volunteer Infantry
- Corporal Edmund English – 2nd New Jersey Volunteer Infantry
- Sergeant John P. Beech – 4th New Jersey Volunteer Infantry
- Captain Forrester L. Taylor – 23rd New Jersey Volunteer Infantry
- Private Frank E. Fesq – 40th New Jersey Volunteer Infantry

== Monuments ==
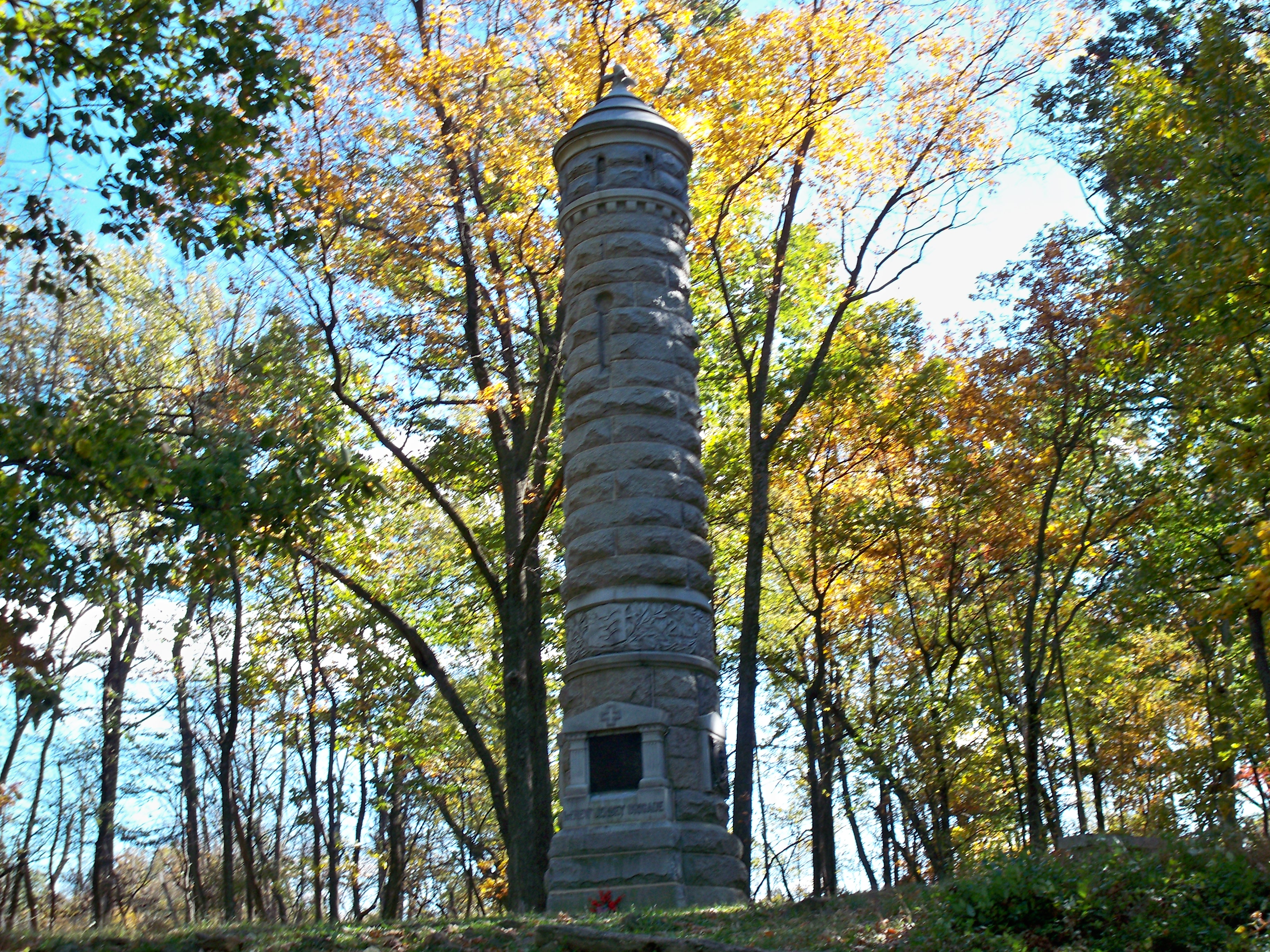
A monument to the brigade at Gettysburg National Military Park

A large monument dedicated to the First New Jersey Brigade stands on Weikert Hill in the Gettysburg National Military Park, marking the general location where the brigade was positioned during the battle.

== See also ==
- List of New Jersey Civil War units
