= 40th New Jersey Infantry Regiment =

- Active: February 2, 1865, to July 13, 1865
- Country: United States
- Allegiance: Union
- Branch: Infantry
- Engagements: Battle of Petersburg III

The 40th New Jersey Infantry Regiment was an infantry regiment raised in the state of New Jersey during the American Civil War. It was the last such unit the state raised for the conflict.

== Organization ==
The first company of the 40th New Jersey Infantry Regiment was organized on October 23, 1864, but since the low enlistments numbers the companies were individually sent to the front, and were temporarily attached to the 4th New Jersey Volunteer Infantry in the First New Jersey Brigade. It was officially organized and mustered in as a whole on March 10, 1865, when the last company was sent to the front. Owing largely to high bounties paid out and a smaller pool of available men of age since the war was in its later days, the unit suffered heavy desertion rates - the highest of any New Jersey infantry regiment. Its commander, Colonel Stephen Rose Gilkyson, had previously commanded the 6th New Jersey Volunteer Infantry as a lieutenant colonel, and had several years of combat field service under his belt. Likewise, most of the 40th's officer corps were combat veterans from previous New Jersey regiments. Due to the haphazard way the unit was organized, many officers served in their duty in the field long before they were officially mustered in.

== Field service ==
Although the unit as it existed at the time was present at the Battle of Hatcher's Run near Dabney's Mills on February 5–7, 1865, the 40th New Jersey participated in their first and last battle on April 2 at Petersburg, where it participated in the final Union army assaults on Confederate entrenchments. There the unit suffered 23 wounded (2 of whom died later). Private Frank E. Fesq of Company A captured the battle flag of the 18th North Carolina Infantry during the assault, earning him the Medal of Honor.

The regiment remained in occupation duty after the Confederate surrender, then was mustered out at Hall's Hill, Virginia, on July 13, 1865.

== Original field and staff ==
- Colonel Stephen R. Gilkyson (mustered on March 10, 1865)
- Lieutenant Colonel Samuel J. Hopkins (not mustered)
- Major J. Augustus Fay, Jr. (mustered on February 16, 1865)
- Adjutant George W. Breen (mustered on April 13, 1865)
- Quartermaster J. Warner Kinsey (mustered on March 20, 1865)
- Chief Surgeon Charles Hall (mustered on February 21, 1865)
- Assistant Surgeon Harmon Heed (mustered on March 17, 1865)
- Assistant Surgeon Elias Wildman (mustered on March 16, 1865)

Lieutenant Colonel Hopkins was never mustered in, and his position was eventually filled by promoting Major Fay to lieutenant colonel. The major's duty of the regiment then went to Captain Andrew J. Mandeville, who was promoted on June 7, 1865.

== Company commanders ==
Company A
Captain John Edelstein
Mustered on October 24, 1864, left state October 24, 1864

Company B
Captain Samuel W. Downs
Mustered on December 24, 1864, left state January 12, 1865

Company C
Captain George Eggers
Mustered on December 24, 1864, left state January 12, 1865

Company D
Captain Maurice C. Stafford
mustered on January 21, 1865, left state January 21, 1865

Company E
Captain Joseph A. Schnetzer
Mustered in January 27, left state January 31, 1865

Company F
Captain Charles E. Grant
Mustered in February 2, left State February 6, 1865

Company G
Captain Ellwood Lippincott
Mustered in February 9, left state February 10, 1865

Company H
Captain Andrew J. Mandeville
Mustered in February 16, left state February 17, 1865

Company I
Captain Ezra Stewart
Mustered in March 2, left state March 4, 1865

Company K
Captain John W. Goodenough
Mustered in March 10, left state March 12, 1865

== See also ==
- List of New Jersey Civil War Units
