= William H. Penrose =

United States Army general (1832–1903)

William Henry Penrose
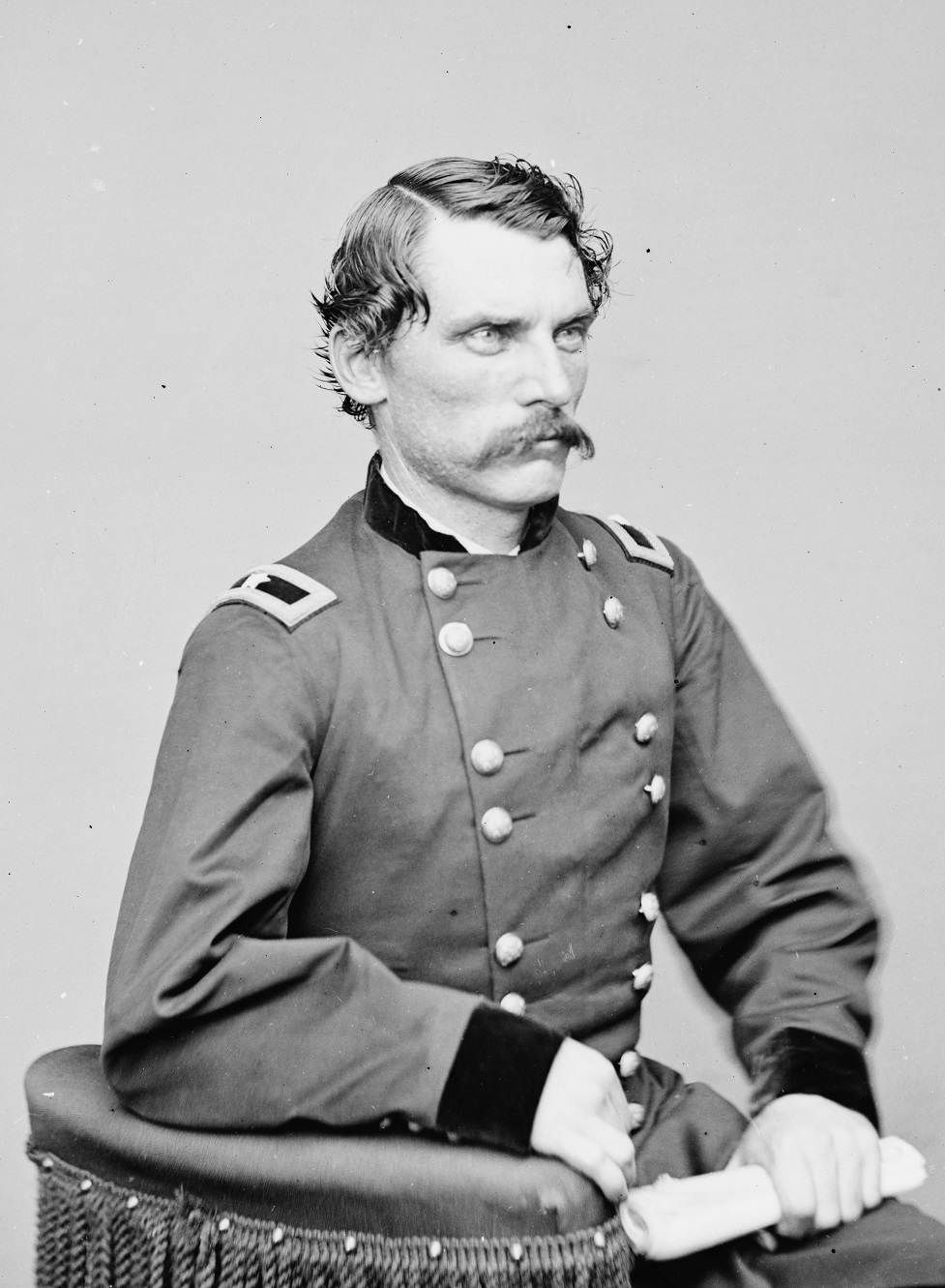
- William Penrose as brigadier general
- Born: March 10, 1832; Sackett's Harbor, New York
- Died: August 29, 1903 (aged 71); Salt Lake City, Utah
- Burial place: Arlington National Cemetery
- Military career
- Allegiance: United States of America; Union
- Branch: United States Army; Union Army
- Service years: 1861–1896
- Rank: Brigadier General
- Commands: 15th New Jersey Infantry; First New Jersey Brigade
- Conflicts: American Civil War: Seven Days Battles; Second Bull Run; Battle of Fredericksburg; Battle of Marye's Heights; Battle of Gettysburg; Battle of the Wilderness; Battle of Spotsylvania; Battle of Fort Stevens; Battle of Cedar Creek; Third Battle of Petersburg; Battle of Sayler's Creek
- Other work: mechanical engineer

William Henry Penrose (March 10, 1832 – August 29, 1903) was a United States Army officer who served in the Union Army during the American Civil War. Penrose commanded the First New Jersey Brigade and ended the war with the rank of brigadier general.

== Biography ==
Penrose was born at Madison Barracks in Sackett's Harbor NY, his father being a career army officer. He moved to Michigan where and became a civil and mechanical engineer. At the beginning of the Civil War Penrose appointed 2nd lieutenant in the 3rd U.S. Infantry and fought in the Seven Days Battles, Second Bull Run and Fredericksburg. In early 1863 he served as the regimental adjutant until being appointed as colonel of the 15th New Jersey Infantry on April 18. He led the regiment at the battle of Marye's Heights, Gettysburg, and the Wilderness briefly in command of the 1st Brigade, 1st Division, VI Corps (First New Jersey Brigade). He received a brevet promotion for conspicuous action at each of these battles. During the battle of Spotsylvania Court House he assumed permanent command of the 1st Brigade, leading it through the battles of Cold Harbor, and Jerusalem Plank Road. The entire VI Corps was transferred to the Civil War Defenses of Washington where Penrose and his brigade were involved in the battle of Fort Stevens. Penrose and the VI Corps were attached to the Army of the Shenandoah during the Shenandoah Valley Campaign of 1864 before returning to the Army of the Potomac along the Petersburg Front. Penrose was awarded a brevet to brigadier general of United States Volunteers for the battle of Cedar Creek. During the Siege of Petersburg the VI Corps was selected to lead the final assault on the Confederate trenches. During this attach Penrose was wounded in the hip but maintained command of his brigade through the battles of Sayler's Creek and Appomattox Court House where he received a brevet promotion to brigadier general in the Regular Army. Penrose was given a full promotion to brigadier general of volunteers in June 1865 and mustered out of volunteer forces in 1866 but stayed in the U.S. Army serving in the 12th, 16th and 20th U.S. Infantry Regiments. While serving in the 12th Infantry he commanded Fort Sully in Dakota Territory. He retired from the army in 1896 and moved to Salt Lake City, Utah where he died on August 29, 1903.

Penrose and his wife Harriet Elizabeth (1836–1910) are buried at Arlington National Cemetery.

== Promotion history ==
Full Promotion

Rank	Unit	Date
2nd Lieutenant	3rd U.S. Infantry	13 April 1861
1st Lieutenant	3rd U.S. Infantry	14 May 1861
Colonel	15th New Jersey Infantry	18 April 1863
Captain	(3rd U.S. Infantry)	11 September 1863
Brigadier General	U.S.V.	27 June 1865
Major	12th U.S. Infantry	31 May 1883
Lieutenant Colonel	16th U.S. Infantry	21 Aug 1888
Colonel	20th U.S. Infantry	28 November 1893

Brevet Promotion

Brevet Rank	Citation	Date
Captain U.S.A.	Marye's Heights	3 May 1863
Major U.S.A.	Gettysburg	3 July 1863
Lieutenant Colonel U.S.A.	Wilderness	5 May 1864
Colonel U.S.A.	Cedar Creek	19 Oct 1864
Brigadier General U.S.V.	Cedar Creek [Middletown]	19 Oct 1864
Brigadier General U.S.A.		9 Apr 1865
