= Battle of Cedar Creek (disambiguation) =

Battle of Cedar Creek was a battle fought in Virginia in 1864 during the American Civil War.

Battle of Cedar Creek may also refer to:

- Skirmish at Cedar Creek, a minor battle fought in Florida in 1864 during the American Civil War
- Battle of Cedar Creek (1876), a battle fought in the Montana Territory during the Great Sioux War of 1876
