= Frank Emil Fesq =

American Civil War Medal of Honor recipient (1840-1920)

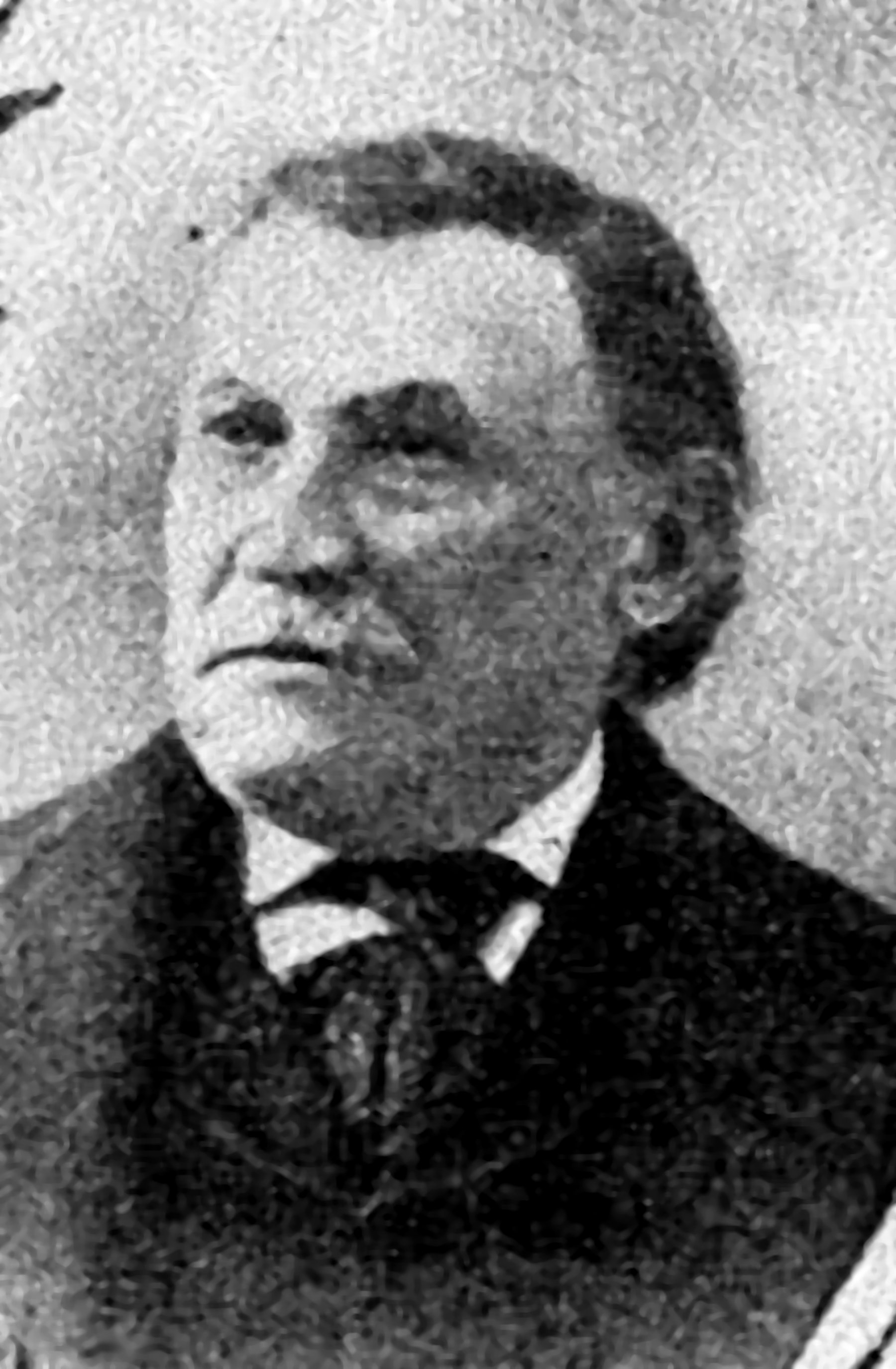
- Fesq c. 1915
- Born: April 4, 1840; Braunschweig, Duchy of Brunswick
- Died: May 6, 1920 (aged 80); Orange, New Jersey, US
- Burial place: Rosedale Cemetery
- Military career
- Allegiance: United States of America
- Branch: United States Army
- Service years: 1864 - 1865
- Rank: Private
- Unit: 40th New Jersey Volunteer Infantry
- Conflicts: Third Battle of Petersburg
- Awards: Medal of Honor

Frank Emil Fesq (April 4, 1840 – May 6, 1920) was a German soldier who fought in the American Civil War. He received the United States' highest award for bravery during combat, the Medal of Honor, for his action during the Third Battle of Petersburg in Virginia on April 2, 1865. He was honored with the award on May 10, 1865.

== Biography ==
Fesq was born in the Duchy of Brunswick on April 4, 1840. At the beginning of the war he was enlisted into service of the 20th New York Volunteer Infantry on May 3, 1861 and was mustered out with the unit on June 1, 1863. He volunteered for the 40th New Jersey Infantry in late 1864 (the unit was not officially organized until February 1865), and mustered out with the regiment in July 1865.

He died on May 6, 1920, and his remains are interred at Rosedale Cemetery in Orange, New Jersey.

== Medal of Honor citation ==
The President of the United States of America, in the name of Congress, takes pleasure in presenting the Medal of Honor to Private Frank E. Fesq, United States Army, for extraordinary heroism on 2 April 1865, while serving with Company A, 40th New Jersey Infantry, in action at Petersburg, Virginia, for capture of flag of 18th North Carolina (Confederate States of America) within the enemy's works.

== See also ==
- List of American Civil War Medal of Honor recipients: A–F
