= John P. Beech =

English-American potter and soldier (1844–1926)

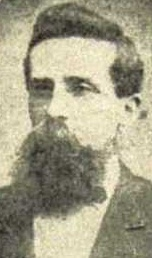
- Born: John Pointon Beech; May 1, 1844; Staffordshire, England
- Died: November 27, 1926 (aged 82); New Jersey, U.S.
- Burial place: Mercer Cemetery, Trenton, New Jersey
- Military career
- Allegiance: United States of America
- Branch: United States Army; Union Army
- Service years: 1861–1865
- Rank: Sergeant
- Unit: 4th New Jersey Infantry Regiment – Company B
- Conflicts: American Civil War; Battle of Gaines' Mill; Battle of Spotsylvania Court House
- Awards: Medal of Honor

Sergeant John Pointon Beech (Note: His surname is spelled Beach in a number of sources. Beech is the spelling on his tombstone and Medal of Honor citation.) (May 1, 1844 – November 27, 1926) was an English-American soldier who fought in the American Civil War. Beech was awarded the United States' highest award for bravery during combat, the Medal of Honor, for his action during the Battle of Spotsylvania Court House, in Virginia, on May 12, 1864. He was honored with the award on June 1, 1894. Outside of his military career, he worked as a potter.

== Biography ==
John Pointon Beech was born in Staffordshire, England, on May 1, 1844. With his family, he emigrated to the United States in 1849. Beech joined the 4th New Jersey Infantry Regiment at Trenton, New Jersey, on August 9, 1861, as a private. On June 27, 1862, Beech was captured at the Battle of Gaines' Mill and then imprisoned at Belle Isle in Richmond, Virginia.

On May 12, 1864, during the Battle of Spotsylvania Court House, in Virginia, most of the members of an artillery battery, deployed in front of Beech's company, were killed by enemy fire. Beech voluntarily assisted the remaining artillery men, despite being under heavy fire. It is for this act of bravery that he was awarded the Medal of Honor on June 1, 1894. Beech was discharged on July 9, 1865, as Sergeant, Company B.

Outside of his military career, Beech worked as a potter.

Beech died on November 27, 1926, at his home; he was buried at the Mercer Cemetery, Trenton, New Jersey. A marker commemorating Beech was erected in Trenton in 1992.

== Medal of Honor citation ==
Voluntarily assisted in working the guns of a battery, all the members of which had been killed or wounded.

== See also ==
- List of American Civil War Medal of Honor recipients: A–F
