= 7th New York Heavy Artillery Regiment =

7th New York Heavy Artillery Regiment, U.S. Volunteers
- Active: August 18, 1862, to August 1, 1865
- Country: United States
- Allegiance: Union
- Branch: Heavy artillery & Infantry
- Engagements: Battle of Spotsylvania Court House; Battle of North Anna; Battle of Cold Harbor; Siege of Petersburg; First Battle of Deep Bottom; Second Battle of Deep Bottom; Second Battle of Ream's Station

The 7th New York Heavy Artillery Regiment, U.S. Volunteers was a heavy artillery regiment that served in the Union Army during the American Civil War. The regiment operated as both heavy artillery and infantry beginning in December 1862 while serving in the defenses of Washington, D.C., and continued in both capacities until the end of the war.

== Service ==
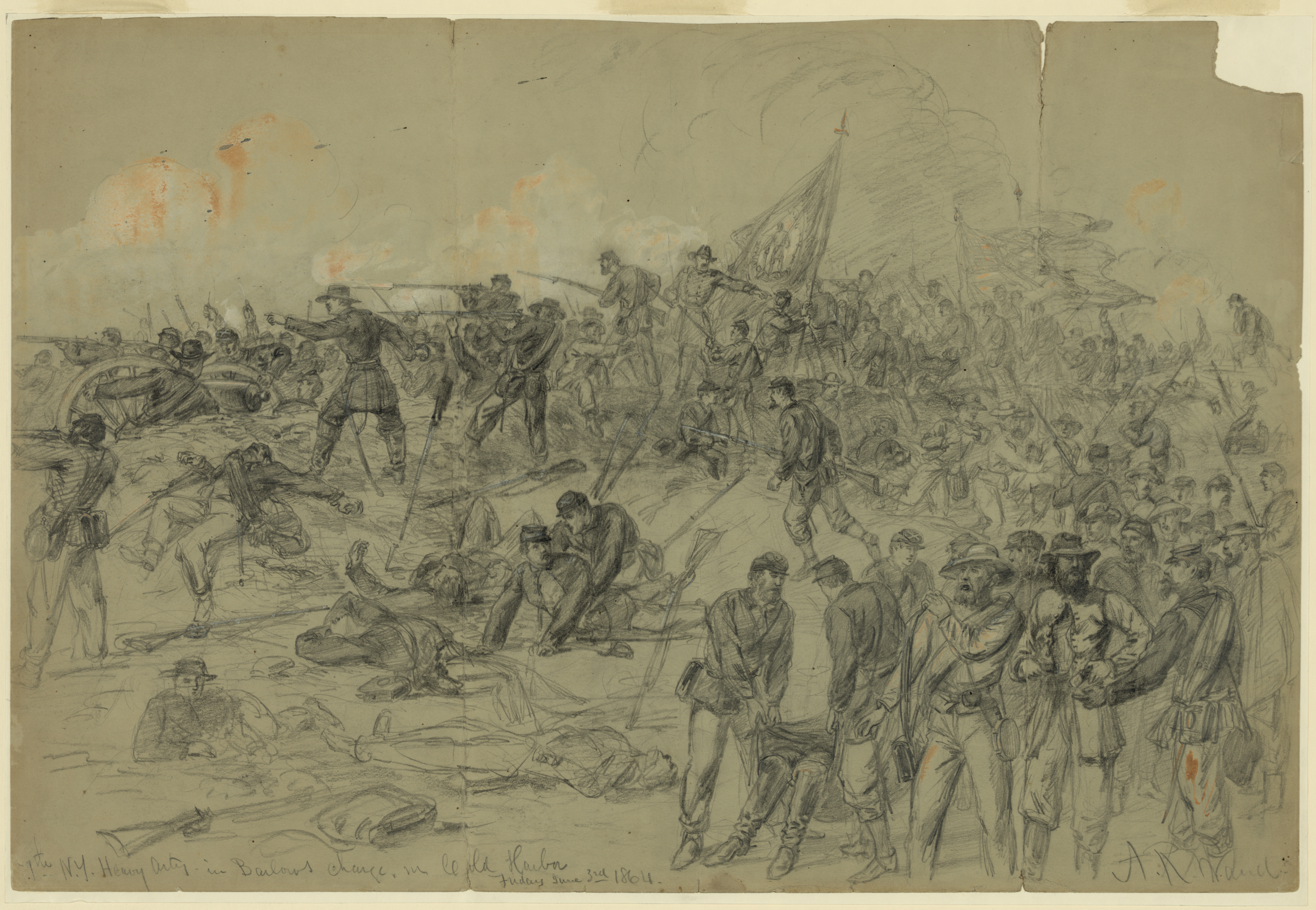
7th New York Heavy Artillery (serving as infantry) preparing to leave the trenches and charge the Confederate line in Barlows charge near Cold Harbor Friday June 3rd, 1864, sketched by Alfred Waud.

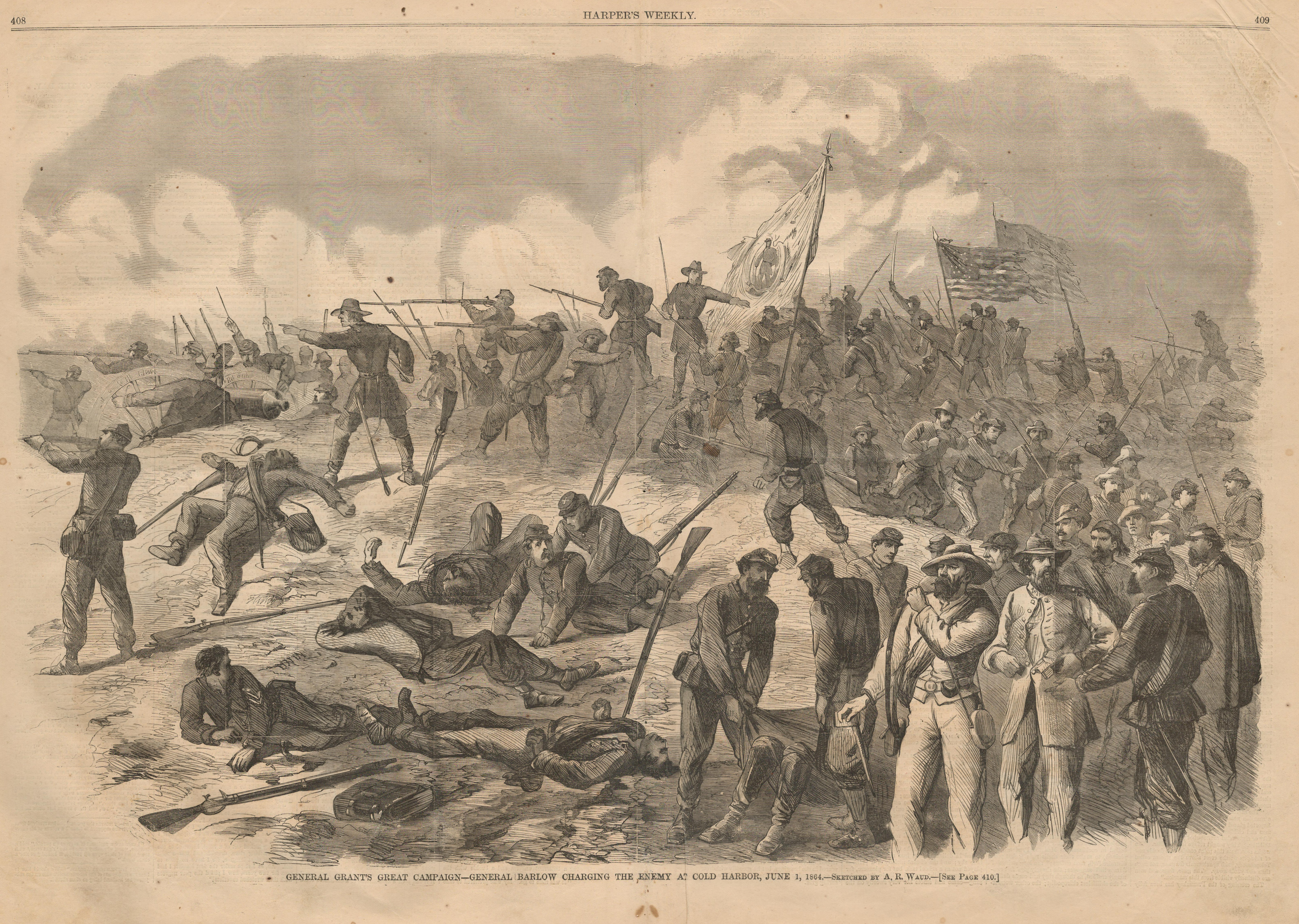
This print, based on the sketch of the same by Alfred Waud, was the centerfold for the June 25, 1864 edition of Harper's Weekly.

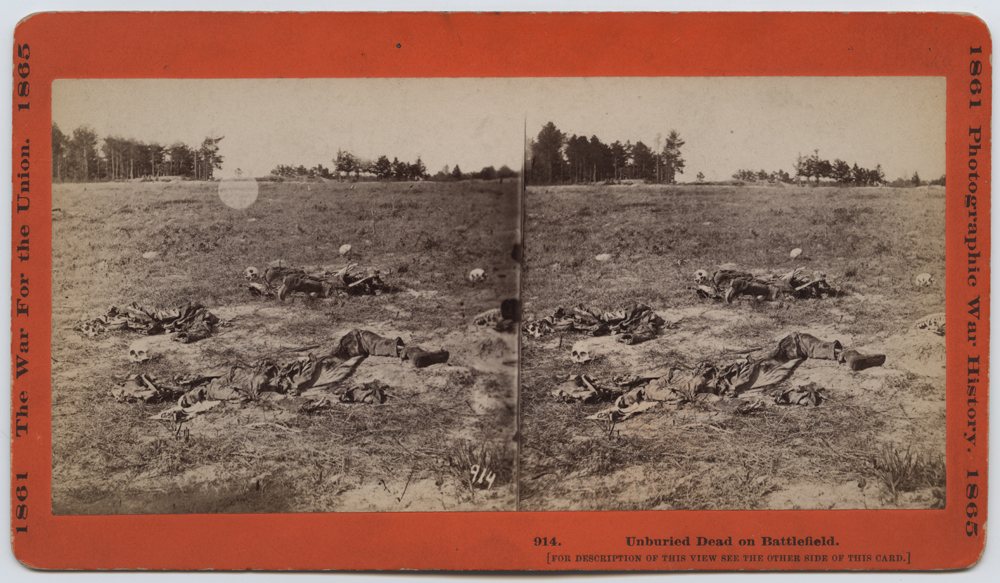
"Unburied Dead on Battlefield" (by John Reekie; issued as Stero #914 being taken on the 1862 Battlefield of Gaines Mills aka First Cold Harbor April 1865; taken near the Adams Farm where 7th New York artillery was stationed June 1864 see Civil war Talk.

The regiment was organized at Albany, New York, as the 113th New York Volunteer Infantry and mustered on August 18, 1862, for three years service under the command of Colonel Lewis O. Morris. Because heavy artillery regiments were needed for the defenses of Washington, D.C., the regiment was converted from infantry on December 10, 1862, and became the 7th New York Heavy Artillery on December 19, 1862. Two additional companies were organized and mustered on August 6, 1863, and January 19, 1864.

The regiment was attached to Defenses North of the Potomac River, September 1862 to February 1863. 2nd Brigade, Haskin's Division, XXII Corps, Department of Washington, to May 1864. Tyler's Heavy Artillery Division, II Corps, Army of the Potomac, May 18–29, 1864. 4th Brigade, 1st Division, II Corps, to November 23, 1864. 2nd Brigade, 1st Division, II Corps, to February 22, 1865. Defenses of Baltimore, Maryland, VIII Corps, Middle Department, to August 1865.

The 7th New York Heavy Artillery mustered out of the service August 1, 1865.

== Detailed service ==
Moved to Washington, D.C., August 19, 1862, and duty in the defenses of that city until December 19, 1862. Garrison duty in the defenses of Washington, D.C., until May 15. 1864. Ordered to join the Army of the Potomac in the field May 15, 1864. Rapidan Campaign May–June. Spotsylvania Court House May 17–21. Harris Farm or Fredericksburg Road May 19. North Anna River May 23–26. On line of the Pamunkey May 26–28. Totopotomoy May 28–31. Cold Harbor June 1–12. Before Petersburg June 16–18. Siege of Petersburg June 16, 1864, to February 22, 1865. Weldon Railroad June 22–23, 1864. Demonstration north of the James River July 27–29. Deep Bottom July 27–28. Mine Explosion, Petersburg, July 30 (reserve). Demonstration north of the James River August 13–20. Strawberry Plains, Deep Bottom, August 14–18. Ream's Station August 25. Hatcher's Run October 27–28. Reconnaissance to Hatcher's Run December 9–10. Dabney's Mills, Hatcher's Run, February 5–7, 1865. Ordered to Baltimore, February 22, and garrison duty there until August.

== Casualties ==
The regiment lost as a total of 669 men during service; 14 officers and 277 enlisted men killed or mortally wounded, four officers and 374 enlisted men died of disease.

== Commanders ==
- Colonel Lewis O. Morris
- Colonel Richard C. Duryea

== Notable members ==
- Sergeant Terrence Begley, Company D – received the Medal of Honor for capturing an enemy flag at Cold Harbor, but received the honor after his death at the Second Battle of Ream's Station.

== See also ==
- List of New York Civil War regiments
- New York in the American Civil War
