= Battle of Smithfield Crossing =

Battle of the American Civil War

Coordinates: 39.3080°N 77.9824°W

- Part of American Civil War
| Date | August 25, 1864 – August 29, 1864 |
| Location | Jefferson County, West Virginia and Berkeley County, West Virginia |
| Result | Inconclusive: Tactical stalemate; Confederate advance permanently halted |

Belligerents
| United States (Union) | (Confederate States of America) Confederate States (Confederacy) |

Commanders and leaders
| Wesley Merritt | Jubal Early |

Strength
| Divisions | Divisions |

Casualties and losses
| Unknown | Unknown |
- 300

The Battle of Smithfield Crossing was a small battle during the American Civil War fought August 25 through August 29, 1864, in Jefferson and Berkeley counties in West Virginia.

== Battle ==
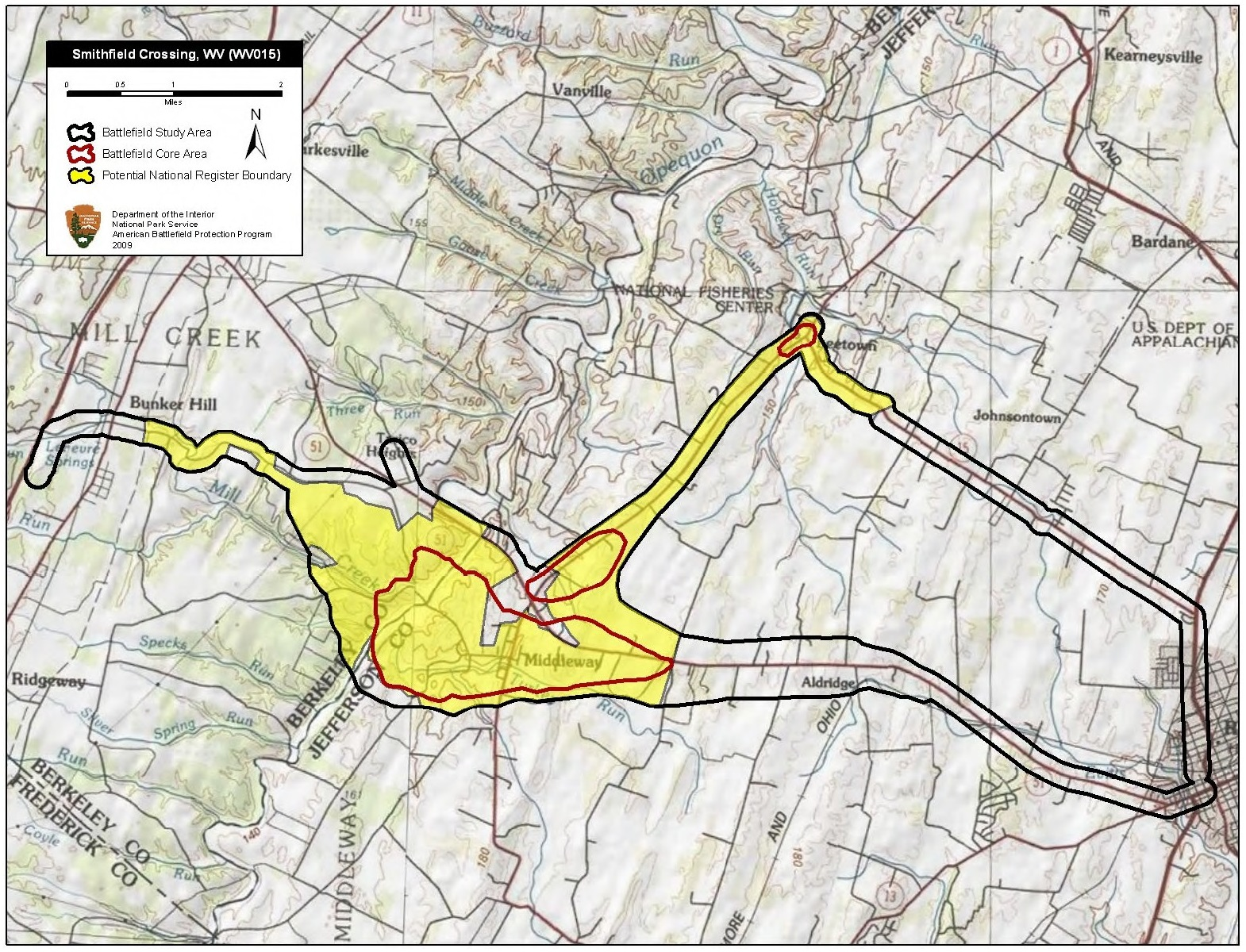
Map of Smithfield Crossing Battlefield core and study areas by the American Battlefield Protection Program.

On August 29, two Confederate infantry divisions under Lieutenant General Jubal Early crossed Opequon Creek at Smithfield Crossing and forced back Wesley Merritt's Union cavalry division. However, a counterattack from Ricketts' infantry division stopped the Confederate advance. Rebel troops were never ordered to attempt another advance, and ultimately the results were inconclusive. It was the last engagement of the war to take place in West Virginia.

== Preservation ==
The battle ranks in the top 3 percent of the more than 16,000 recorded armed encounters in the Civil War. The Middleway Conservancy Organization commemorated the 150th anniversary of the Battle of Smithfield Crossing in August 2014. To expand the community's knowledge and interest in this battle, the Conservancy hosts a living history event and reenactment of the battle.
