= 14th New Hampshire Infantry Regiment =

- Active: September 24, 1862 - July 8, 1865
- Country: United States of America
- Allegiance: New Hampshire & Union
- Type: volunteer infantry
- Engagements: First Battle of Deep Bottom; Third Battle of Winchester; Battle of Smithfield Crossing; Battle of Berryville; Battle of Fisher's Hill; Battle of Tom's Brook; Battle of Cedar Creek

Commanders
- Notable commanders: Alexander Gardiner; Carroll Davidson Wright

The 14th New Hampshire Infantry Regiment was an infantry regiment that participated in the American Civil War. It was the last three-year regiment raised in New Hampshire, serving from September 24, 1862, to July 8, 1865. Carroll Davidson Wright was one of its regimental leaders.

== History ==
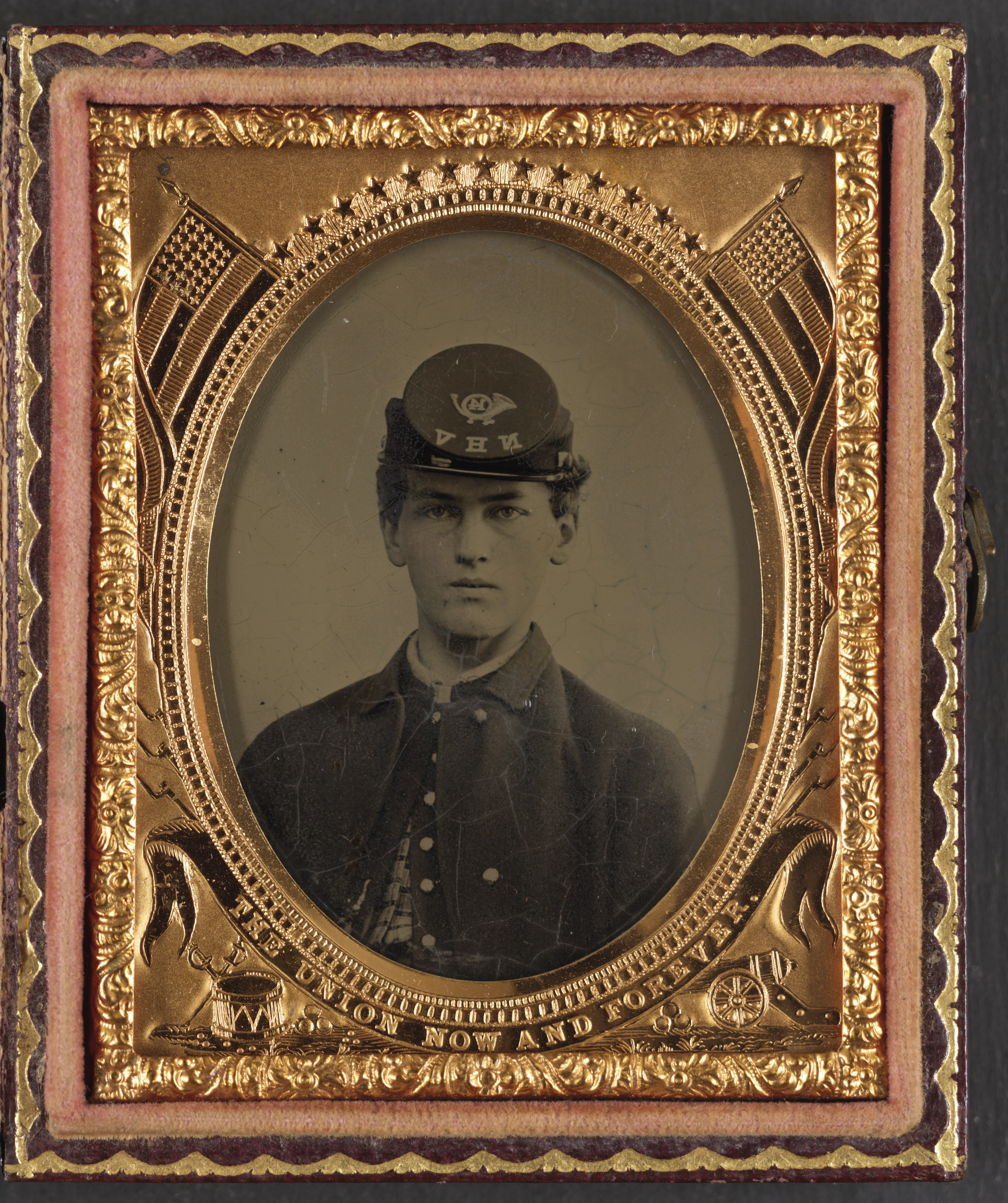
Unidentified soldier with the 14th New Hampshire

On September 24, 1862, the regiment was organized and mustered in Concord, New Hampshire. It was filled mostly with residents of the four western counties. Cheshire County furnished four companies, while Sullivan, Grafton, Coos, Carroll, Merrimack and Hillsborough Counties furnished one Company each.

In October 1862, the 14th NH arrived in Washington, D.C., where it camped on East Capitol Hill before establishing winter quarters at Poolesville, Maryland. From November 1862 to April 1863, the 14th NH served picket duty along the upper Potomac River. In April 1863, the regiment moved its quarters to Camp Adirondack, in northeast Washington D.C. From April 1863 to the end of the year, the 14th NH performed guard duty at Old Capitol Prison, transporting prisoners and deserters, and at the Navy Yard Bridge (Benning's Bridge). In early 1864, the 14th NH briefly performed picket duty in the Shenandoah Valley.

The regiment returned to New Hampshire to vote in the spring elections which were heavily contested. On March 16, 1864, the 14th N.H. departed for Louisiana to participate in the Red River Campaign, but arrived after it had ended. The regiment served at Camp Parapet, Carrollton, and Jefferson City until June 1864, when they returned to Virginia. The 14th served at Fortress Monroe and Berryville in Virginia until the end of July 1864. From August to December 1864, the regiment was part of General Sheridan's Army of the Shenandoah, and participated in the Third Battle of Winchester, on September 19, 1864, with heavy losses at the Battle of Fisher's Hill on September 22, 1864, and the Battle of Cedar Creek on October 19, 1864. Sergeant Major J. Henry Jenks, from Keene, New Hampshire, was the last man from this unit to fall in battle on October 19, 1864, in the Battle of Cedar Creek. At the conclusion of the Civil War, the 14th NH was stationed near Augusta and Savannah, Georgia. On July 8, 1865, the 14th New Hampshire Volunteer Regiment was mustered out in Savannah.

== Affiliations, battle honors, detailed service, and casualties ==
=== Organizational affiliation ===
Its assignments are as follows:

- Attached to Grover's Brigade, Military District of Washington, to February 1863.
- Jewett's Brigade, XXII Corps, Defenses of Washington, to June 1863.
- Garrison of Washington, DC, XXII Corps, to March 1864.
- Unattached, Defenses of New Orleans, LA, Department of the Gulf, to June 1864.
- 1st Brigade, 2nd Division. XIX Corps, Department of the Gulf, to July 1864
- Army of the Shenandoah, Middle Military Division, to January 1865.
- 1st Brigade, Grover's Division, District of Savannah, GA, Department of the South, to March 1865.
- 1st Brigade, 1st Division, X Corps, Department of North Carolina, to May 1865.
- Department of the South to July 1865.

=== List of battles ===
The official list of battles in which the regiment bore a part:

- First Battle of Deep Bottom
- Third Battle of Winchester
- Battle of Smithfield Crossing
- Battle of Berryville
- Battle of Fisher's Hill
- Battle of Tom's Brook
- Battle of Cedar Creek

=== Detailed service ===
==== 1862 ====
- Picket and patrol duty along Upper Potomac, Defenses of Washington, November 1862, to April, 1863

==== 1863 ====
- Provost duty at Washington, D. C., till February 1864

==== 1864 ====
- Ordered to Harper's Ferry, W. Va., February 3, thence moved to Cumberland, Md., and return to Washington February 25.
- Ordered to New Orleans, La., and sailed from New York March 20.
- Duty at Camp Parapet, Carrollton, Jefferson City and along Lake Pontchartrain till June.
- Ordered to Morganza. LA., June 7.
- Movement to Fortress Monroe, Va., thence to Washington, D. C., and to Berryville, Va., July 13- August 19.
- Sheridan's Shenandoah Valley Campaign August to December.
- Battle of Winchester September 19. Fisher's Hill September 22.
- Battle of Cedar Creek October 19.
- Duty at Kernstown and other points in the Shenandoah Valley till January 1865

==== 1865 ====
- Moved to Washington, D. c., thence to Savannah, GA
- January 3–20 and Provost duty there till May 6.
- March to Augusta, Ga., May 6–14.
- Return to Savannah June and mustered out July 8, 1865

=== Casualties and total strength ===
The regiment lost a total of 232 men during its service; 8 officers and 63 enlisted men killed and mortally wounded, 4 officers and 151 enlisted men by disease.

== See also ==
- List of New Hampshire Civil War Units
