= 10th New Jersey Infantry Regiment =

- Flag of New Jersey
- Active: October 1, 1861, to June 22, 1865
- Country: United States of America
- Allegiance: Union
- Branch: Union Army
- Type: Infantry
- Equipment: Enfield/Springfield rifles
- Engagements: Battle of the Wilderness, Battle of Spotsylvania, Battle of Cold Harbor, Battle of Strasburg, Battle of Fisher's Hill, Battle of Opequon, Battle of Cedar Creek and Battle of Petersburg III

Commanders
- Notable commanders: James W. McNeely

The 10th New Jersey Infantry Regiment was a regiment was organized under the provisions of an Act of Congress approved July 22, 1861, and by authority issued by the War Department. It was created to recruit from residents of the State of New Jersey, but was not under the control or supervision of the State authorities. It was originally known as "Olden Legion" after New Jersey Governor Charles Olden.

== History ==
William Bryan of Beverly, New Jersey, recruited and organized the 10th New Jersey Infantry Regiment. According to Foster, On the first roster of the regiment, after being placed in State service, is this endorsement: "This regiment was raised by individuals, not authorized by the State, and accepted by the War Department as an independent organization, some time in the fall of 1861, and was not known by the State authorities until it was placed under their care, January 29, 1862."

When the organization of the regiment was completed with nine companies of infantry and one company of cavalry, it was established at Camp Beverly, New Jersey, where William Bryan lived. The unit proceeded to Washington, D.C., on December 26, 1861, with 35 officers, 883 non-commissioned officers and privates, for a total of 918 men.

After they marched to Camp Clay on the Bladensburg Turnpike, a location approximately one mile from Washington, they were reorganized and designated the 10th New Jersey Infantry. Soon after being reorganized the cavalry company, Company D, was discharged and a new company was raised that April. In fact, the regiment was not very effective by February 1862 when many of the cavalry company were under arrest for refusing to do infantry duties.

For the next year, the regiment served under the command of Brig. Gen. James Wadsworth in the defenses of Washington before being assigned to field service in the XXII Corps until April 1863.

According to Foster this regiment suffered from defective organization and the absence of discipline soon after arriving in Washington. The War Department turned to Governor Olden who did not want responsibility for this problem regiment. In the end, however, the State accepted responsibility after reorganizing the regiment and assigning a new Colonel, William R. Murphy.

The regiment moved between various commands — beginning with the 3rd Brigade, 1st Division, VII Corps, Department of Virginia, until July 1863, when it was sent to Philadelphia, Pennsylvania, after the Gettysburg campaign and assigned to Darius Couch and the Department of the Susquehanna. It served in the defenses of Philadelphia until September 1863, when it moved to Pottsville, Pennsylvania. The regiment remained in the Department of the Susquehanna through April 1864. After more than 50% of the men re-enlisted the regiment became known as the 10th New Jersey Veteran Infantry. The regiment joined the First New Jersey Brigade in the 1st Division, VI Corps, in the Army of the Potomac on April 19, 1864, and was sent to Virginia for the Overland Campaign. During that campaign, the regiment notably participated in the Battle of the Wilderness, Spotsylvania, and Cold Harbor, losing 250 men. In late summer, the 10th was assigned to the Army of the Shenandoah, serving in the Shenandoah Valley under Philip H. Sheridan.

While with the Army of the Shenandoah the regiment, along with the First New Jersey Brigade, participated in the battles of Strasburg, Point Pleasant, Fisher's Hill, Third Winchester and Cedar Creek losing another 200 men. After returning to Virginia for the fall of Petersburg and the surrender of Robert E. Lee's Army of Northern Virginia at Appomattox Court House in April 1865, the 10th served as an occupation force at Danville, Virginia, until June 1865 when it was mustered out and returned home to New Jersey and a hero's welcome. Many veterans of the 10th New Jersey joined the Grand Army of the Republic and attended several reunions over the succeeding years.
