= 34th New Jersey Infantry Regiment =

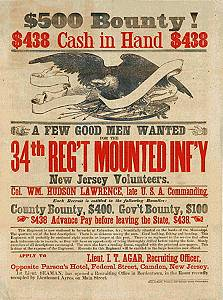
- Active: September 3, 1863, to April 30, 1866
- Country: United States
- Allegiance: Union
- Branch: Infantry
- Engagements: Battle of Spanish Fort; Battle of Fort Blakeley

The 34th New Jersey Infantry Regiment was an infantry regiment in the Union Army during the American Civil War.

== Service ==
The 34th New Jersey Infantry Regiment began organization at Beverly, New Jersey, for three years service with Company A being the first to muster into the service on September 3, 1863.

The regiment was attached to District of Columbus, Kentucky, 6th Division, XVI Corps, Department of the Tennessee, to August 1864. District of Paducah, Kentucky, Department of the Ohio, to February 1865. 3rd Brigade, 2nd Division, XVI Corps, Military Division of West Mississippi, to August 1865. District of Alabama, Department of the Gulf, to April 1866.

The 34th New Jersey Infantry mustered out of service April 10, 1866, and the men were discharged at Trenton, New Jersey, on April 30, 1865.

== Detailed service ==
Left New Jersey for Eastport, Miss., November 16. 1863. Moved from Eastport, Miss., to Columbus, Ky., December 12–20, 1863, then to Union City, Tenn., December 20. Expedition to Huntington, Tenn., in pursuit of Forrest December 22, 1863, to January 21, 1864. Garrison duty at Columbus, Ky., January 21 to August 28. Expedition to Riley's Landing February 17. Near Island No. 10 March 6. Scout from Island No. 10 to New Madrid March 18 (Company C). Skirmishes at Columbus, Ky.. March 27 and April 11–13. Hickman June 10. Expedition into the interior July 9–12. (Company C on duty at Island No. 10 July and August.) Clinton July 10. Expedition to Uniontown, Ky., against Johnston and Adams August 15–25. Moved to Mayfield, Ky., August 28. Duty there and at Paducah, Ky., until December. Moved to Nashville, Tenn., December 25, then to Eastport, Miss., January 11, 1865, and duty there until February 7. Moved to New Orleans, La., February 7–22. Campaign against Mobile, Ala., and its defenses March 17-April 12. Siege of Spanish Fort and Fort Blakely March 26-April 8. Assault and capture of Fort Blakely April 9. Occupation of Mobile April 12, March to Montgomery April 13–25, and provost duty there, at Montevallo, Talladega, Gainesville, Tuscaloosa, and other points in Alabama until April 1866.

== Casualties ==
The regiment lost a total of 170 men during service; 3 enlisted men killed or mortally wounded, 3 officers and 164 enlisted men died of disease.

== Commanders ==
- Colonel William Hudson Lawrence

== See also ==
- List of New Jersey Civil War units
- New Jersey in the American Civil War
