= 4th New Jersey Infantry Regiment =

- Active: April 27, 1861 to July 31, 1861; August 19, 1861 to July 9, 1865
- Country: United States
- Allegiance: Union
- Branch: Infantry
- Engagements: First Battle of Bull Run (reserve); Siege of Yorktown; Seven Days Battles; Battle of Gaines's Mill; Battle of Glendale; Battle of Malvern Hill; Second Battle of Bull Run; Battle of South Mountain; Battle of Antietam; Battle of Fredericksburg; Battle of Chancellorsville; Battle of Gettysburg; Bristoe Campaign; Mine Run Campaign; Battle of the Wilderness; Battle of Spotsylvania Court House; Battle of Cold Harbor; Siege of Petersburg; Battle of Fort Stevens; Battle of Fisher's Hill; Third Battle of Winchester; Battle of Cedar Creek; Third Battle of Petersburg; Appomattox Campaign; Battle of Appomattox Court House

The 4th New Jersey Infantry Regiment was an infantry regiment in the Union Army during the American Civil War. Overall, the regiment lost 5 officers and 156 enlisted men killed or mortally wounded and 2 officers and 103 enlisted men to disease during the Civil War. The regiment's first commander, Colonel James H. Simpson, helped lead the 4th N.J through the hardships of the first year of campaigning.

== Service ==
=== Three months regiment ===
The 4th New Jersey Infantry Regiment was first organized at Trenton, New Jersey for three months service on April 27, 1861. It was attached to Runyon's New Jersey Brigade, Defenses of Washington, to June 1861. It was then attached to 1st Brigade, Runyon's Reserve Division, McDowell's Army of Northeast Virginia.

- Left New Jersey for Annapolis, Maryland, May 3.
- Reported to General Butler May 5, then moved to Washington, D.C., arriving there May 6.
- At Meridian Hill until May 24.
- Occupation of Arlington Heights, Va., May 24.
- Construction of Fort Runyon.
- Duty on line of Alexandria & Loudon Railroad until July 16.
- Advance on Manassas, Va., July 16–21.
- Battle of Bull Run July 21 (reserve).
- Mustered out of service on July 31, 1861.

=== Three years regiment ===
The 4th New Jersey Infantry was reorganized at Camp Olden in Trenton for three years service on August 19, 1861, under the command of Colonel James H. Simpson.

The regiment was attached to Kearney's Brigade, Division of the Potomac, to October 1861. Kearney's Brigade, Franklin's Division, Army of the Potomac, to March 1862. 1st Brigade, 1st Division, I Corps, Army of the Potomac, to April 1862. 1st Brigade, 1st Division, Department of the Rappahannock, to May 1862. 1st Brigade, 1st Division, VI Corps, Army of the Potomac and Army of the Shenandoah, to July 1865.

The regiment was surrounded at Gaines Mill and most of its men taken prisoner. After the Seven Days Battles, they were freed by the Confederate authorities in a prisoner exchange. The 4th New Jersey had been armed with M1861 Springfield rifles, however upon returning from captivity, the authorities in Washington had no rifled muskets to rearm the regiment with, thus they were given outdated .69 smoothbore muskets. The regiment was forced to use them until the Battle of South Mountain in September, when they rearmed themselves with Enfield rifles dropped by retreating Confederates.

Left New Jersey for Washington, D.C., August 20, 1861. Duty in the defenses of Washington, D. C., until March 1862. Advance on Manassas, Va., March 8–15, 1862. Advance from Alexandria to Bristoe Station April 7–11. Embarked for the Virginia Peninsula April 17. Siege of Yorktown April 19-May 5 (on transports). West Point May 7–8. Reconnaissance to East Branch Chickahominy June 7 (Companies D, F, and I). Seven Days Battles before Richmond June 25-July 1: Battles of Gaines's Mill June 27, Charles City Cross Roads and Glendale June 30, Malvern Hill July 1. At Harrison's Landing until August 16. Movement to Fort Monroe, then to Manassas, Va., August 16–26. Pope's Campaign in northern Virginia August 26-September 2. Bull Run Bridge, Manassas, August 27. Second Battle of Bull Run August 30. Cover Pope's retreat to Centreville August 30–31. Maryland Campaign September 6–22. Battles of Crampton's Pass, South Mountain, September 14. Battle of Antietam September 16–17. At Sharpsburg, Md., until October 29. Movement to Falmouth, Va., October 29-November 19. Battle of Fredericksburg December 12–15. At Falmouth until April 27, 1863. "Mud March" January 20–24. Chancellorsville Campaign April 27-May 6. Operations at Franklin's Crossing April 29-May 2. Battle of Maryes Heights, Fredericksburg, May 3. Salem Heights May 3–4. Banks's Ford May 4. Gettysburg Campaign June 11-July 24. Battle of Gettysburg July 2–4. Guarding ammunition train July. In camp near Warrenton, Va., until September 15, and at Culpeper Court House until October. Bristoe Campaign October 9–22. Advance to line of the Rappahannock November 7–8. Rappahannock Station November 7. Mine Run Campaign November 26-December 2. At Brandy Station to May 1864. Campaign from the Rapidan to the James May 3-June 15. Battle of the Wilderness May 5–7. Spotsylvania May 8–12. Spotsylvania Court House May 12–21. Assault on the Salient, "Bloody Angle," May 12. North Anna River May 23–26. On line of the Pamunkey May 26–28. Totopotomoy May 28–31. Cold Harbor June 1–12. Before Petersburg June 17–18. Siege of Petersburg until July 9. Jerusalem Plank Road June 22–23. Moved to Washington, D.C., June 9–11. Repulse of Early's attack on Fort Stevens and the northern Defenses of Washington July 11–12. Pursuit of Early to Snicker's Gap July 14–23. Sheridan's Shenandoah Valley Campaign August 7-November 28. Strasburg August 14–15. Cedar Creek August 15. Winchester August 17. Charlestown August 21–22. Battle of Winchester September 19. Fisher's Hill September 22. Battle of Cedar Creek October 19, Duty in the Shenandoah Valley until December. Moved to Washington, D.C., then to Petersburg. Siege of Petersburg December 1864 to April 2, 1865. Dabney's Mills, Hatcher's Run, February 5–7, 1865. Appomattox Campaign March 28-April 9. Fall of Petersburg April 2. Pursuit of Lee April 3–9. Appomattox Court House April 9. Surrender of Lee and his army. March to Danville April 23–27 and duty there until May 18. Moved to Richmond, Va., then to Washington, D.C., May 18-June 3. Corps review June 8.

The 4th New Jersey Infantry mustered out of service July 9, 1865 at Hall's Hill, Virginia.

== Casualties ==
The regiment lost a total of 266 men during service; 5 officers and 156 enlisted men killed or mortally wounded, 2 officers and 103 enlisted men died of disease.

== Commanders ==
- Colonel James H. Simpson - resigned August 24, 1862 to resume his duties as a major in the Corps of Topographical Engineers
- Colonel William B. Hatch - commanded the regiment at the Battle of Gaines's Mill while at the rank of lieutenant colonel after Col. Simpson and 400 men from the regiment were captured; promoted to colonel August 26, 1862 and mortally wounded in action at the Battle of Fredericksburg
- Colonel William Birney - promoted to brigadier general May 22, 1863
- Colonel David Vickers - mustered out May 18, 1865
- Colonel Edward L. Campbell
- Major Charles Ewing - commanded at the Battle of Gettysburg
- Captain Ebenezer Davis - commanded at the Battle of Fort Stevens
- Captain Baldwin Hufty - commanded at the Battle of Fisher's Hill, Third Battle of Winchester, and Battle of Cedar Creek

== Notable members ==
- Sergeant John P. Beech, Company B - Medal of Honor recipient for action at the Battle of Spotsylvania Court House

== Reenactors ==
The 4th New Jersey Volunteer Infantry portrays the group at many reenactments. They also do fundraiser events and living histories in various parks and battlefields.

== See also ==
- List of New Jersey Civil War units
- New Jersey in the American Civil War
