= 4th New York Infantry Regiment =

- Active: May 2, 1861, to May 25, 1863
- Country: United States
- Allegiance: Union
- Branch: Infantry
- Size: 780, (Note: As reported back to Adjutant General Hillhouse upon departure from New York on June 3, 1861) 792, (Note: As reported back to Adjutant General Hillhouse, on December 31, 1862) 780 (Note: As reported back to Adjutant General Sprague, on December 31, 1863)
- Nickname: First Scott's Life Guard
- Equipment: Model 1842 Springfield Muskets (.69 caliber, smooth) (Note: On 8 May 1861, 742 Model 1842 Springfield smoothbore (ca!. 69).), Springfield Model 1855, Springfield Model 1861 (.58 caliber) (Note: As seen in survey before Fredericksburg and Chancellorsville.)
- Engagements: Battle of Antietam; Battle of Fredericksburg; Battle of Chancellorsville

Commanders
- Colonel: Alfred W. Taylor
- Colonel: John D. MacGregor;

Insignia
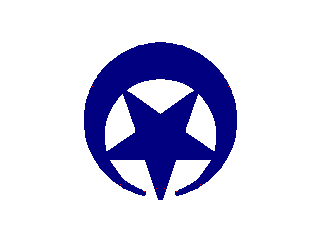
- VII Corps (3rd Division) badge

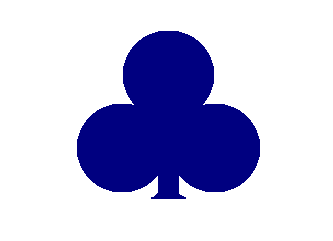
- II Corps (3rd Division) badge

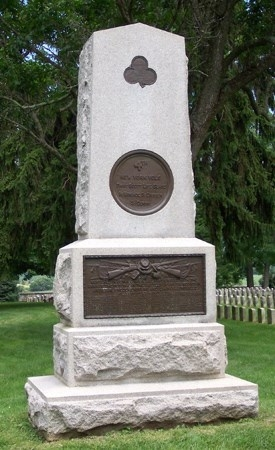
The 4th New York Volunteer Infantry Monument at Antietam National Cemetery, dedicated in 1887

The 4th New York Infantry Regiment was an infantry regiment that served in the Union Army during the American Civil War. It is also known as the 1st Scott's Life Guard.

== Organization ==
The 4th New York organized in the city of New York, under the auspices of the "Veteran Scott Life Guard," an association incorporated by the Legislature, Friday, March 26, 1861, and composed of persons who had served in the Mexican–American War. Eight companies were mustered into the State service by Maj. Robert Taylor, Monday, April 22, 1861, on which day Edward McK. Hudson was elected Colonel; John D. MacGregor, Lieut. Colonel, and Alfred W. Taylor, Major, whose election was confirmed by the State Board on April 25. On Thursday, May 9, the companies recruited for it were formed by the State Board into a regiment, and numbered. Six companies (C, D, E, F, H and K), were mustered into the United States service for a two years' term on May 2, two companies (A and G), on May 7, and two companies (B and I), on May 9.

On the 13th of May, Col. Hudson having declined command of the regiment, Alfred W. Taylor was elected Colonel, and William Jameson, Major, in place of Taylor promoted to Lieut. Colonel. On Wednesday, May 8, 742 United States percussion muskets, pattern 1848, calibre 69, were issued to the regiment by Commissary General Welch.

To assist in the organization of the Regiment the Union Defense Committee of New York city expended $3,987.16. The total expenditure by the State, on, behalf of the regiment, exclusive of subsistence and quarters, up to August 15, 1861, was $43,897,81. At the end of their term of service, the regiment returned to New York city, where they were honorably discharged May 25, 1863.

The original companies were recruited principally:

- A — New York city by Joseph Henriques
- B - New York city by Samuel S. May
- C - New York city by James Mooneye
- D - New York city by Charles W. Kruger
- E — Brooklyn by William B. Parison
- F - New York city by John H. Camp
- G - New York city by John B. Brahams
- H - New York city by William Jameson
- I - New York city by John B. Houstain
- K - New York city by And. J. Constantine

== Service ==
On Monday, June 3, 1861, it left New York and on Friday, June 3, arrived at Newport News. It was quartered there until July 26, when it was sent to Baltimore, MD. The 4th remained there until Saturday, August 31. On that day, it was sent to Havre de Grace, MD, at the mouth of the Susquehanna River and the head of Chesapeake Bay. It remained there until March 26, 1862 serving as security between there and Baltimore for the vital Philadelphia and Baltimore section of the Pennsylvania Railroad supply line. It was next sent to garrison Fort McHenry, Baltimore, where it remained until Friday, June 6.

Leaving Fort McHenry, the 4th went to Suffolk where it was attached to VII Corps. It spent the summer in garrison at Suffolk where it had a change of command with Col. McGregor relieving Col. Taylor. On September 6, it was sent to Washington. DC. Leaving there on September 11, it moved up the Potomac and joined the Army of the Potomac's 3rd Brigade, 3rd Division of II Corps. The 4th fought in its first battle at Antietam on September 17. It suffered heavy losses of 2 officers and 42 enlisted men killed, 12 enlisted men mortally wounded, 6 officers and 124 wounded, and 1 missing for an aggregate of 187. (Note: There is a discrepancy between Phisterer, Federal Publishing and the New York State Military Museum (NYSMM) which cites 3rd Annual Report Of The Bureau Of Military Statistics from the 1870s. Federal Publishing (1908) reports 44 killed, 142 wounded and I missing, and NYSMM (ca. 1870) reports 38 killed, 130 wounded, and one missing. Given that the Phisterer 3rd edition was published in 1912, those numbers are reported here.)

After Antietam, the 4th was part of the force sent to reoccupy Harper's Ferry on Monday, September 22 as the Rebels had withdrawn to the Rappahannock. It remained in the garrison there for five and a half weeks until October 30, when it marched down to Falmouth with the army arriving opposite Fredericksburg on November 17.

From December 12–15, 1862, it was heavily engaged at the Battle of Fredericksburg. In that battle on December 13, it suffered 6 enlisted men killed, 7 enlisted men mortally wounded, 6 officers (including the Colonel) and 49 enlisted men wounded, and 6 missing for an aggregate of 74. After the battle, the regiment recrossed the Rappahannock and went into winter quarters at Falmouth, VA.

In January 1863, the 4th took part in the ineffective "Mud March" and returned to its winter quarters. It remained there until the army began maneuvering in April in the Chancellorsville Campaign.

In the campaign, Col. McGregor, as the senior regimental commander, assumed command of the brigade delegating the regiment to Lieut. Col. William Jameson. The 4th and its brigade narrowly escaped capture on May 1, on the Plank Road leading to Fredericksburg. Unknowingly moving toward an overwhelming Rebel force, Gen. Hooker recalled it back to Federal lines before contact. Upon return to the main body of the army, the 4th was detailed to special duty guarding the II Corps hospital. (Note: Due to sickness on May 2, McGreggor turned over command of the brigade to Col. Charles Albright of the 132nd Pennsylvania and went into the hospital as a patient.) As a result, it suffered no losses in the defeat.

By mid-May, the 4th detached from the 3rd brigade and returned to New York city where it mustered out in City Hall Park on May 25, 1863.

== Affiliations, battle honors, detailed service, and casualties ==
=== Organizational affiliation ===
Attached to:

- Attached to Newport News, VA, Department of Virginia, to July 1861.
- Dix's Command, Baltimore, MD, to June 1862.
- Mansfield's Division, Newport News, VA, Department of Virginia, to July 1862.
- Weber's Brigade, Division at Suffolk, [VII Corps, Dept. of Virginia, to September, 1862.
- 3rd Brigade, 3rd Division, II Corps, to May, 1863.

=== List of battles ===
The official list of battles in which the regiment bore a part:

- Battle of Antietam
- Battle of Fredericksburg
- Battle of Chancellorsville

=== Detailed service ===
==== 1861 ====
- Departed New York May 18
- Duty at Newport News, Va., June 7 to July 25, 1861.
- Moved to Baltimore, Md., July 25, and rail security duty there and at Havre de Grace till June 5, 1862.

==== 1862 ====
- Moved to Suffolk, VA, June 5, and duty there till September 6
- Ordered to join Army of the Potomac September 8.
- Maryland Campaign
- Battle of Antietam September 16–17
- Moved to Harper's Ferry, September 22, and duty there till October 30.
- Reconnaissance to Charlestown October 16–17
- Advance up Loudoun Valley and movement to Falmouth, Va., October 30-November 17
- Battle of Fredericksburg December 12–15.

==== 1863 ====
- "Mud March" January 20–24, 1863
- At Falmouth till April 27
- Chancellorsville Campaign April 27-May 6
- Battle of Chancellorsville May 1–5
- Mustered out New York city, May 25, 1863

== Total strength and casualties ==
During its service it lost by death, killed in action, 2 officers, 48 enlisted men; of wounds received in action, 19 enlisted men; of disease and other causes, 1 officer, 23 enlisted men; total, 3 officers, 90 enlisted men; aggregate, 93 (Note: Phisterer's numbers.)

== Commanders ==
- Colonel Alfred W. Taylor - May 15, 1861 - July 7, 1862
- Colonel John Dunn MacGregor - July 7, 1862 - May 25, 1863

== Armament ==
The 4th New York were issued the Model 1842 Springfield Muskets .69 caliber, smoothbore when accepted by the state on Wednesday, April 25, 1861. At some time prior to the Fredericksburg campaign, the regiment exchanged their 1842 Springfield smoothbores for a mix of Springfield Model 1855/1861 National Armory (NA) and contract (Note: In government records, National Armory refers to one of three United States Armory and Arsenals, the Springfield Armory, the Harpers Ferry Armory, and the Rock Island Arsenal. Rifle-muskets, muskets, and rifles were manufactured in Springfield and Harper's Ferry before the war. When the Rebels destroyed the Harpers Ferry Armory early in the American Civil War and stole the machinery for the Confederate central government-run Richmond Armory, the Springfield Armory was briefly the only government manufacturer of arms, until the Rock Island Arsenal was established in 1862. During this time production ramped up to unprecedented levels ever seen in American manufacturing up until that time, with only 9,601 rifles manufactured in 1860, rising to a peak of 276,200 by 1864. These advancements would not only give the Union a decisive technological advantage over the Confederacy during the war but served as a precursor to the mass production manufacturing that contributed to the post-war Second Industrial Revolution and 20th century machine manufacturing capabilities. American historian Merritt Roe Smith has drawn comparisons between the early assembly machining of the Springfield rifles and the later production of the Ford Model T, with the latter having considerably more parts, but producing a similar numbers of units in the earliest years of the 1913–1915 automobile assembly line, indirectly due to mass production manufacturing advancements pioneered by the armory 50 years earlier. These rifles were also produced by contracted commercial arms companies who, by the contract, had to meet the NA manufacturing specifications.) rifle-muskets.The regiment reported the following surveys:

Fredericksburg

- A — 35 Springfield Rifled Muskets, model 1855, 1861, NA and contract, (.58 Cal.)
- B — 23 Springfield Rifled Muskets, model 1855, 1861, NA and contract, (.58 Cal.)
- C — 33 Springfield Rifled Muskets, model 1855, 1861, NA and contract, (.58 Cal.)
- D — 25 Springfield Rifled Muskets, model 1855, 1861, NA and contract, (.58 Cal.)
- E — 30 Springfield Rifled Muskets, model 1855, 1861, NA and contract, (.58 Cal.)
- F — 41 Springfield Rifled Muskets, model 1855, 1861, NA and contract, (.58 Cal.)
- G — 41 Springfield Rifled Muskets, model 1855, 1861, NA and contract, (.58 Cal.)
- H — 29 Springfield Rifled Muskets, model 1855, 1861, NA and contract, (.58 Cal.)
- I — 40 Springfield Rifled Muskets, model 1855, 1861, NA and contract, (.58 Cal.)
- K — 45 Springfield Rifled Muskets, model 1855, 1861, NA and contract, (.58 Cal.)

Chancellorsville

- A — 42 Springfield Rifled Muskets, model 1855, 1861, NA and contract, (.58 Cal.)
- B — 30 Springfield Rifled Muskets, model 1855, 1861, NA and contract, (.58 Cal.)
- C — 37 Springfield Rifled Muskets, model 1855, 1861, NA and contract, (.58 Cal.)
- D — 35 Springfield Rifled Muskets, model 1855, 1861, NA and contract, (.58 Cal.)
- E — 36 Springfield Rifled Muskets, model 1855, 1861, NA and contract, (.58 Cal.)
- F — 58 Springfield Rifled Muskets, model 1855, 1861, NA and contract, (.58 Cal.)
- G — 42 Springfield Rifled Muskets, model 1855, 1861, NA and contract, (.58 Cal.)
- H — 32 Springfield Rifled Muskets, model 1855, 1861, NA and contract, (.58 Cal.)
- I — 40 Springfield Rifled Muskets, model 1855, 1861, NA and contract, (.58 Cal.)
- K — 45 Springfield Rifled Muskets, model 1855, 1861, NA and contract, (.58 Cal.)

=== Shoulder Arms ===
Issued weapons

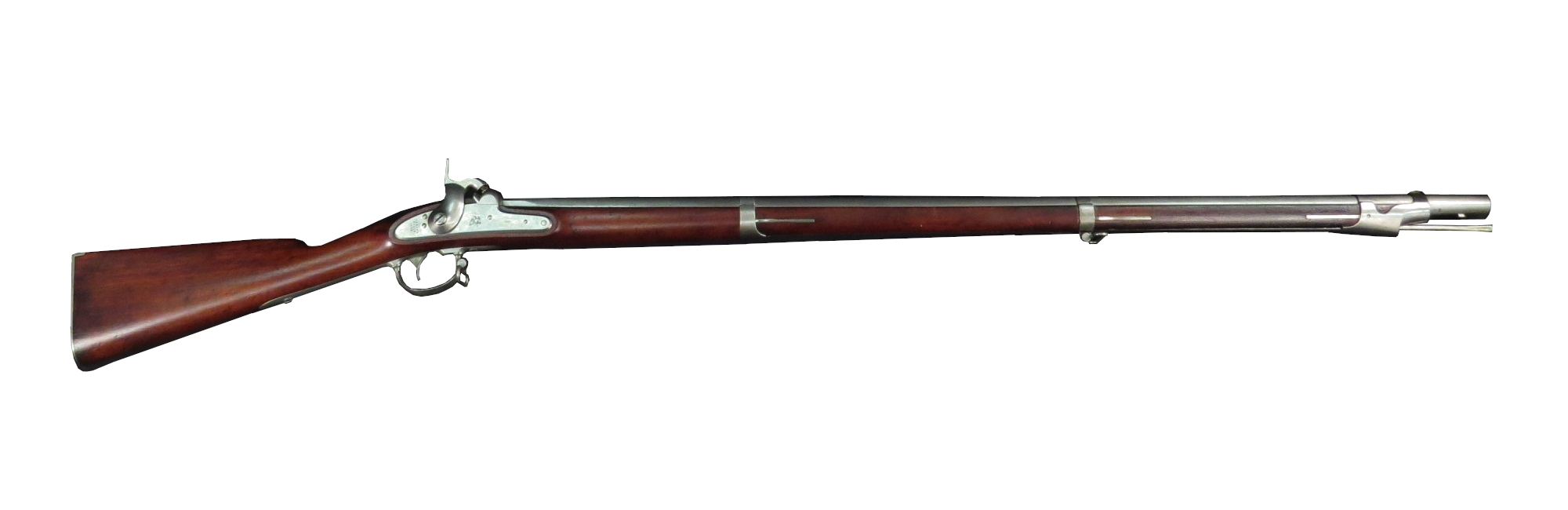
Model 1842 smoothbore musket

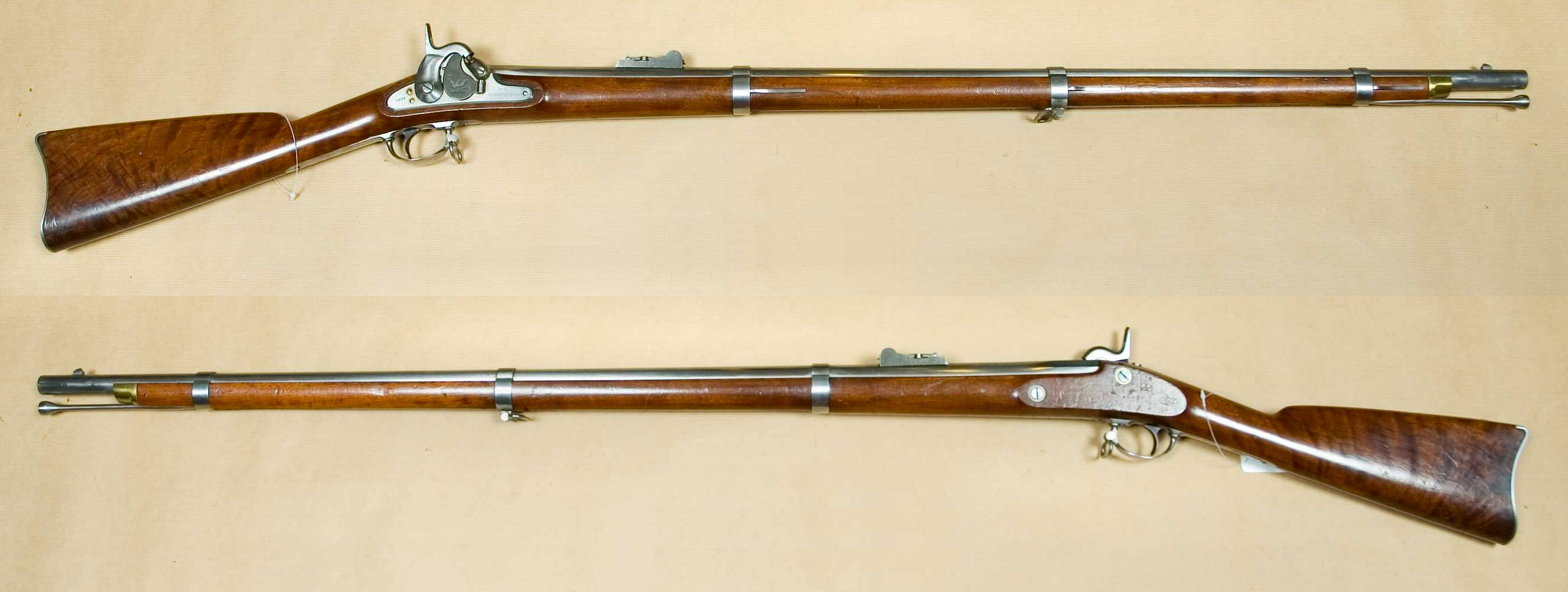
Springfield Model 1855

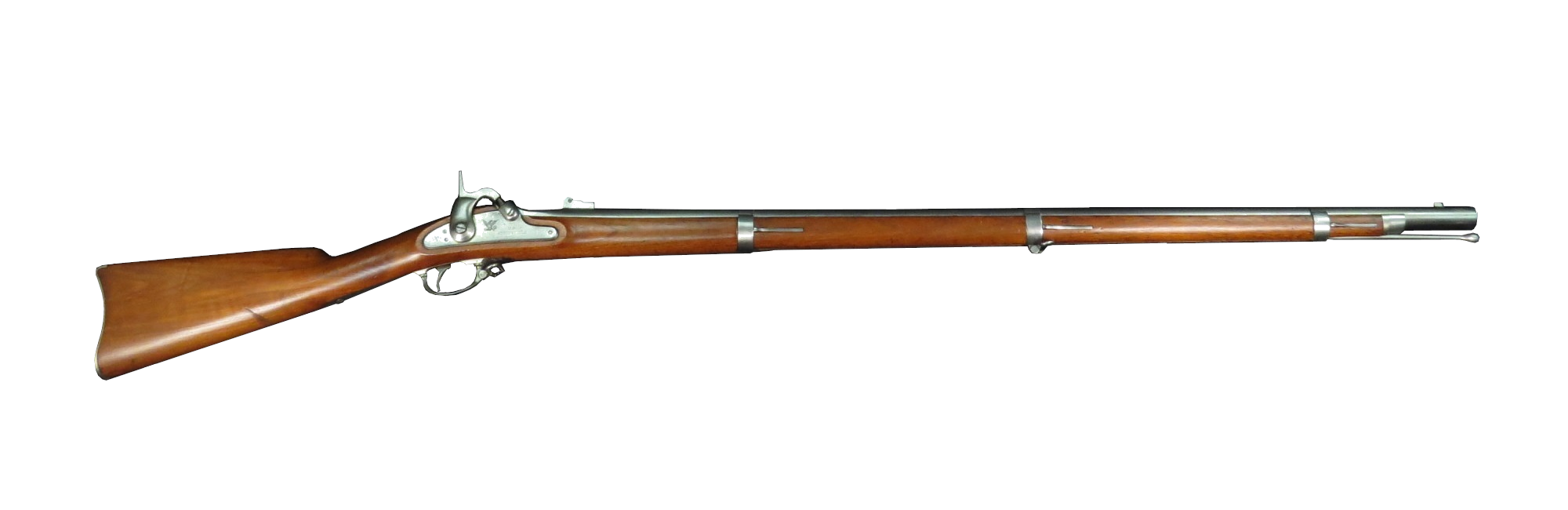
Springfield Model 1861

== Uniform ==
The men of the regiment were issued the dark blue New York state eight button jackets with shoulder straps trimmed in light blue. They also were issued the state dark blue trousers. As their service continued, the standard sky blue trousers were worn when the original trousers wore out.

== See also ==
- List of New York Civil War regiments
