= 202nd Pennsylvania Infantry Regiment =

Union Army infantry regiment

202nd Pennsylvania Volunteer Infantry
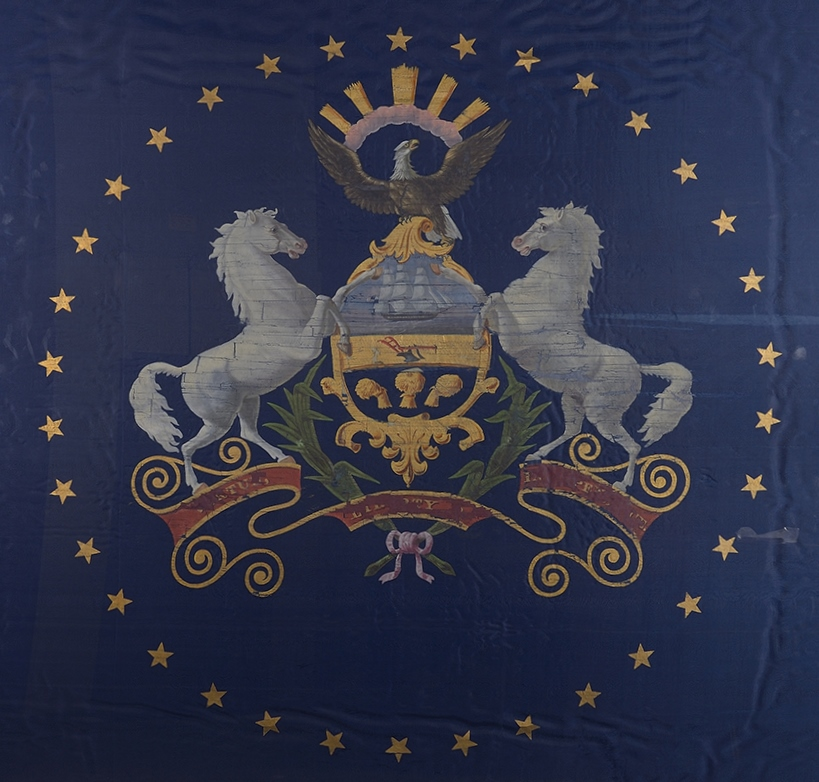
- State Flag of Pennsylvania, circa 1863.
- Active: 3 September 1864–3 August 1865
- Country: United States
- Allegiance: Union
- Branch: Union Army
- Role: Infantry
- Engagements: American Civil War

The 202nd Regiment Pennsylvania Volunteer Infantry was an infantry regiment of the Union Army in the American Civil War. Raised in the Harrisburg area and the Coal Region in August and September 1864, the regiment was sent to the Manassas Gap Railroad to guard it against the attacks of Confederate partisan rangers led by John Mosby. Following the Union victory at Battle of Cedar Creek, the regiment helped break up the now unneeded railroad and moved to Alexandria to guard the railroad there. After the end of the war, the regiment served in the Coal Region to suppress labor unrest, and was mustered out in mid-1865.

== History ==
=== Organization ===
The 202nd Pennsylvania was raised in the Harrisburg area and the Coal Region beginning in early August 1864 for a one-year term in response to President Abraham Lincoln's call for 500,000 men. It was organized under the command of Colonel Charles Albright, a lawyer and former colonel of the 132nd Pennsylvania, at Camp Curtin near Harrisburg on 3 September. The companies were recruited as follows: A in Carbon County, B in Juniata County, C in Adams County, D in Northumberland and Cumberland Counties, E in Lehigh County, F in Northampton County, G and H in Cumberland County, I in Union County, and K in Huntingdon County. Although some of its officers and men were veterans, most had little military experience.

=== Camp Couch and Manassas Gap Railroad ===
Rail bridge with train on the Orange and Alexandria, guarded by the regiment

The regiment was sent to Camp Couch near Chambersburg in the Department of the Susquehanna for training on 10 September, and began an exercise march of three days on 23 September. While the regiment was at Camp Couch, Albright was sent to Columbia County to collect witnesses against arrested draft evaders who participated in the Fishing Creek Confederacy; he was absent from the regiment for several weeks. The regiment was sent via Washington, D.C. to Alexandria on 29 September, and after its arrival took positions guarding the Manassas Gap Railroad from Thoroughfare Gap to Rectortown, part of the District of Alexandria in XXII Corps. The vital Manassas Gap Railroad transported supplies to the Army of the Shenandoah, and as a result was frequently attacked by Confederate partisan rangers led by John Mosby. The regiment fought in skirmishes against the Mosby men at Salem on 8 and 16 October, suffering several casualties although inflicting losses on and driving off the Confederate forces. A train was derailed while moving at full speed by the guerrillas on 10 October, killing four to five and severely wounding an estimated twenty, after which they fired upon the survivors. In response, Albright ordered every building within a mile burned, and forced Confederate sympathizers to accompany each train, preventing further attacks.

=== Alexandria railroad guard duty ===
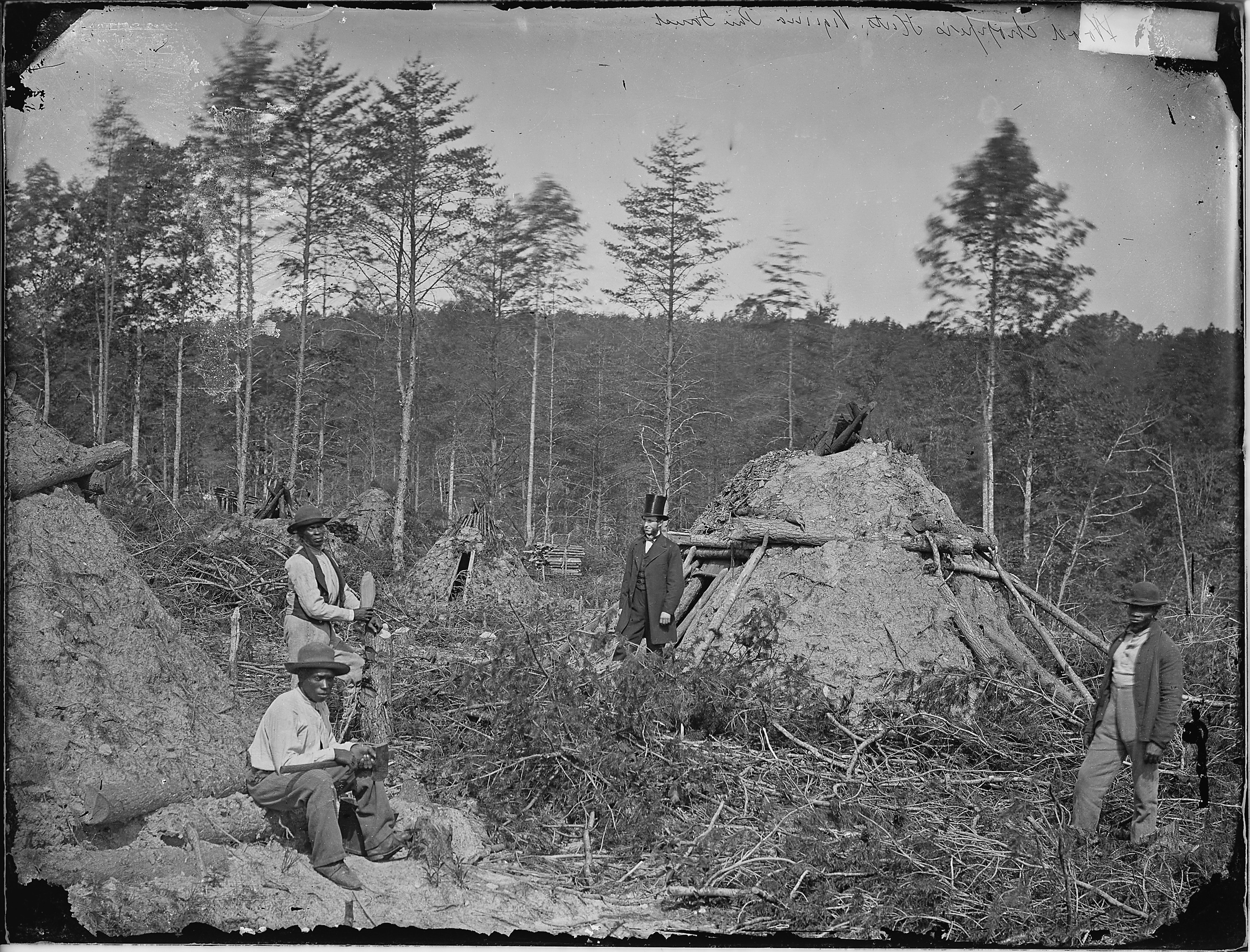
Wood choppers with huts on the Orange and Alexandria, escorted by the regiment

After the Union victory in the Shenandoah at Cedar Creek, the railroad was no longer necessary, and the regiment helped remove the ties and rails. Following the completion of the rail destruction, the 202nd returned to Alexandria, guarding the Orange and Alexandria Railroad from Bull Run to Alexandria, headquartered at Fairfax Station. There, it became part of the 1st Separate Brigade of XXII Corps. The soldiers of the regiment escorted woodmen felling timber for the construction of four large fortifications near Fairfax Station and details transporting timber for the needs of the army. In a New Year's greeting for 1865 sent to the regiment by brigade commander General William Gamble, he complimented the brigade, writing "You have a good regiment, and I am glad to know the right kind of a Colonel is at the head of it."

=== Coal Region service ===
After the end of the war, in late May, the 202nd was relocated to Philadelphia and was sent to the Coal Region to suppress a strike by miners of the New York and Schuylkill Coal Company. It arrived in the coal center of present-day Jim Thorpe, Pennsylvania on 29 May. The regimental headquarters was located at Tamaqua and it was divided into detachments in the region, whose District of Lehigh (part of the Department of Pennsylvania) was placed under the command of Albright. The coal mine operators helped determine detachment locations, including one sent to Forestville on 24 June. Regular patrols between Forestville and the mines at Swatara, New Mines, and Heckscherville by the 202nd Pennsylvania intimidated the strikers into reducing their demands, and eventually ended the strike entirely. Company A moved to Pittsburgh in early July, after which the regiment concentrated at Harrisburg near the end of the month, before it was mustered out on 3 August. During its service, the regiment suffered a total of 36 deaths: three enlisted men killed and 33 died of disease.

== See also ==
- List of Pennsylvania Civil War regiments
- Pennsylvania in the Civil War
