= Fairfax Station Railroad Museum =

Railroad museum

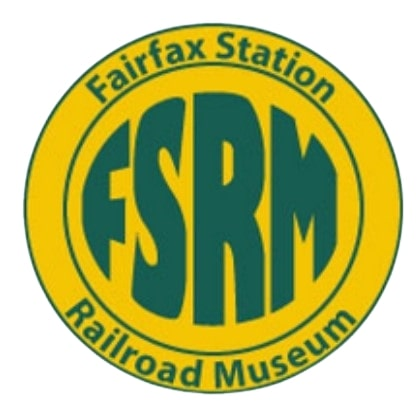

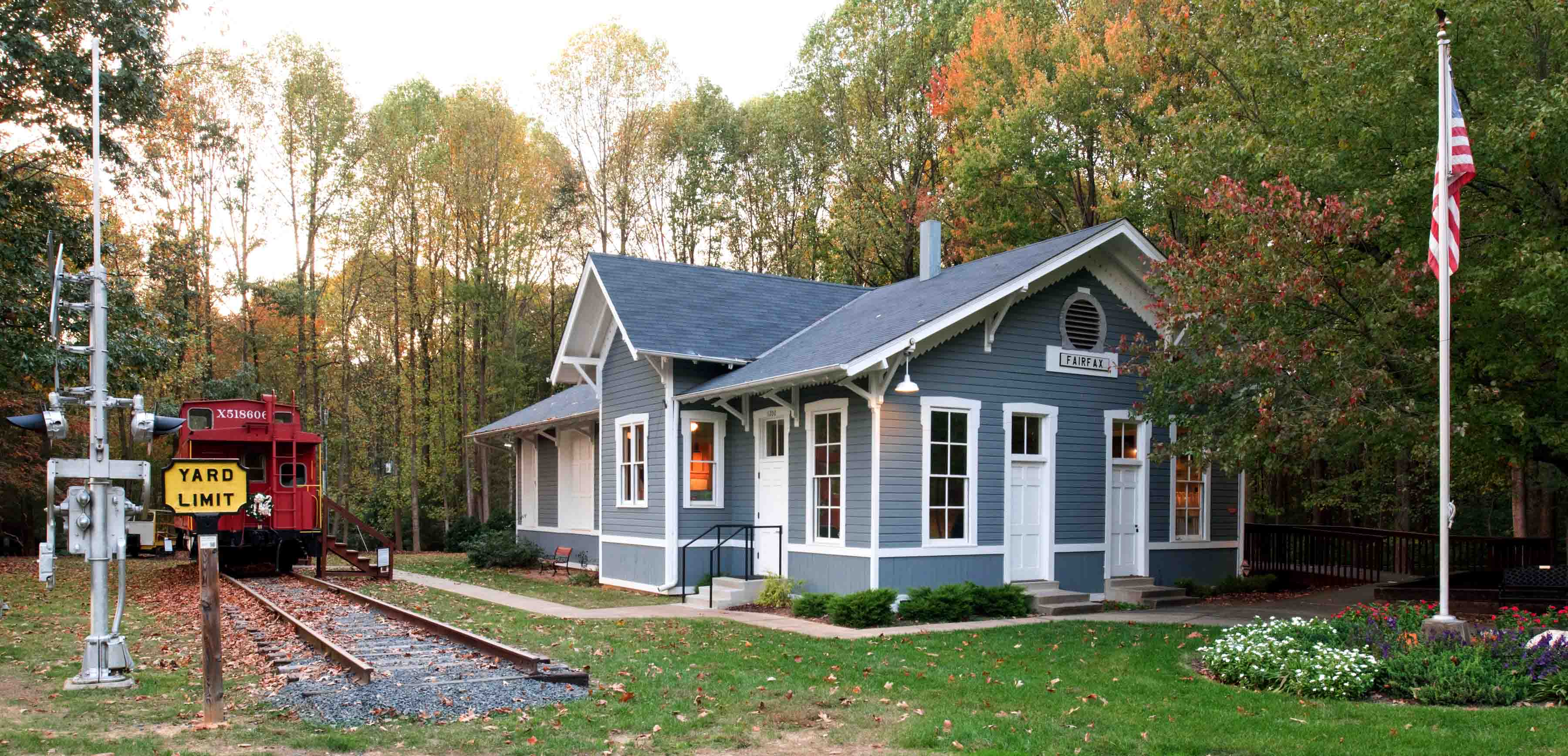
- Established: 1987 (Building Dedicated)
- Coordinates: 38°48′2.3616″N 77°19′54.5268″W
- Type: Community/local history museum
- Founder: Lena Wyckoff
- Website: https://fairfax-station.org/

The Fairfax Station Railroad Museum (FSRM) is a depot museum located in the census-designated place of Fairfax Station in Fairfax County, Virginia. It is owned and operated by the Friends of the Fairfax Station, an all-volunteer, 501(c)(3) non-profit organization. The purpose of the Friends is to maintain the former station as a museum with a focus on local history, the significance of railroads in the region, and the role of the station during the American Civil War. It opened in April 1988.

Three buildings were constructed at the location that would become known as Fairfax Station in 1852, 1873, and 1891. The third was relocated in the early 1900s to accommodate the reconstruction of the entire line by then-owner Southern Railway Co. The museum is a replica of this structure.

== Station ==
=== The O&A Station: 1852 ===
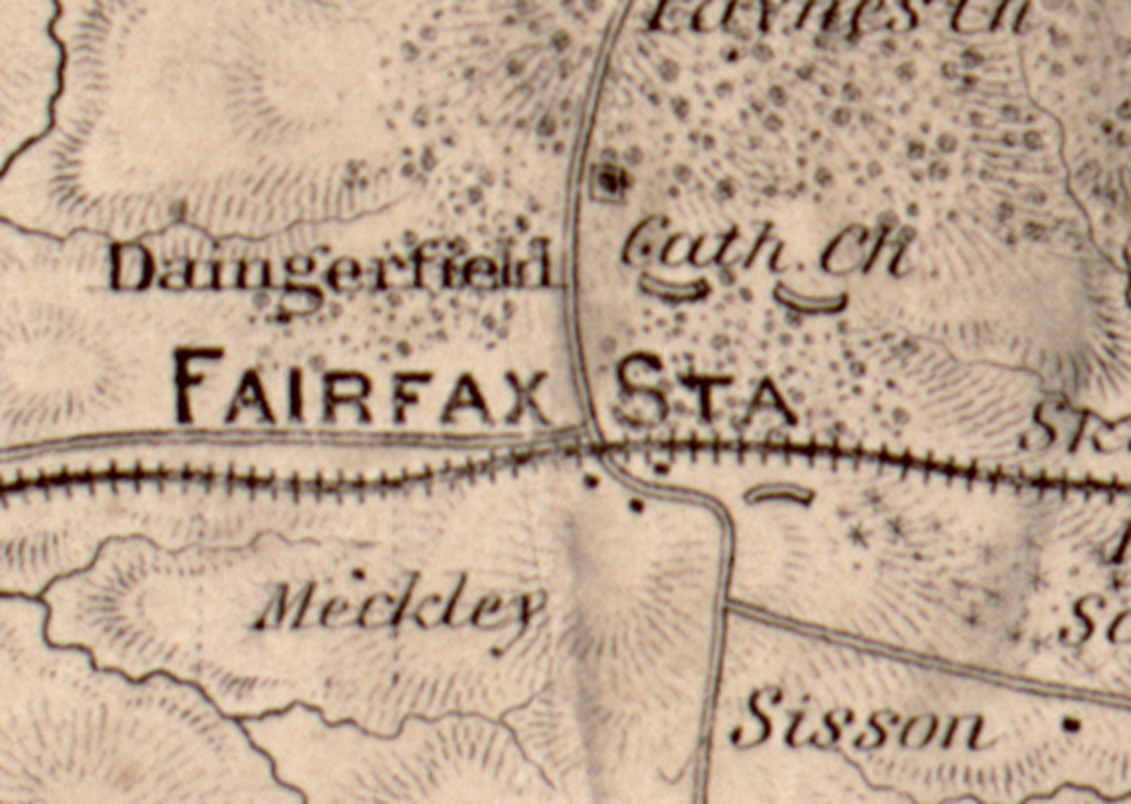
The depot is one of the cluster of buildings along the Orange & Alexandria Railroad at Fairfax Station in this detail from an 1862 map. Library of Congress, Map of n. eastern Virginia and vicinity of Washington, United States. Corps of Topographical Engineers McDowell, Irvin, 1818-1885; Schedler, J. (Joseph), Washington, D.C.? : s.n., 1862.

Although the exact date is unknown, the first station probably was constructed no later than 1852 as a stop on the Orange & Alexandria Railroad (O&A). The O&A was chartered in 1848 to run from the port city of Alexandria, Virginia, through Virginia's central farmlands to Gordonsville in Orange County. The O&A was under construction in Fairfax County in 1850. By October 1851, 28 miles of the railroad had been completed, taking it all the way through Fairfax County. The O&A reported freight revenue originating at Fairfax Station in 1851. The awarding of mail contracts in 1852 provides the strongest evidence of a station building having been constructed by that time. The U.S. Post Office Department established post offices at Fairfax Station and nearby Burke, another O&A stop, in April 1852.

Fairfax Station was constructed to service the town of Providence – the county seat now known as the City of Fairfax. The building was described by soldiers in 1862 as a modest, two-storied building. It included office space and possibly a residence for the station master. A survey published in May 1862 shows several buildings clustered on the south side of the O&A tracks. One of them presumably was the station.

=== Civil War years ===
The environment around Fairfax Station changed dramatically with the advent of the Civil War. O&A facilities in Alexandria were seized by Federal troops in the early stages of the conflict. Both Federal and Confederate forces focused on controlling or disrupting the rail line due to its strategic position through central Virginia.

The agrarian quality of life around the station changed quickly as the station was converted to a communications post and field hospital. Federal forces used the station to evacuate wounded soldiers during the battles of Second Bull Run and Chantilly in 1862. An estimated 3,500 soldiers, perhaps hundreds more, made their way to the station where they were treated and returned to hospitals in Alexandria and Washington City. Clara Barton was among the civilian volunteers aiding the effort. The depot was abandoned and destroyed on Sept. 2, 1862, as the fortunes of battle turned against Federal forces. Units returned by the end of the month and began rebuilding capacity but it would be years before another station building was constructed.

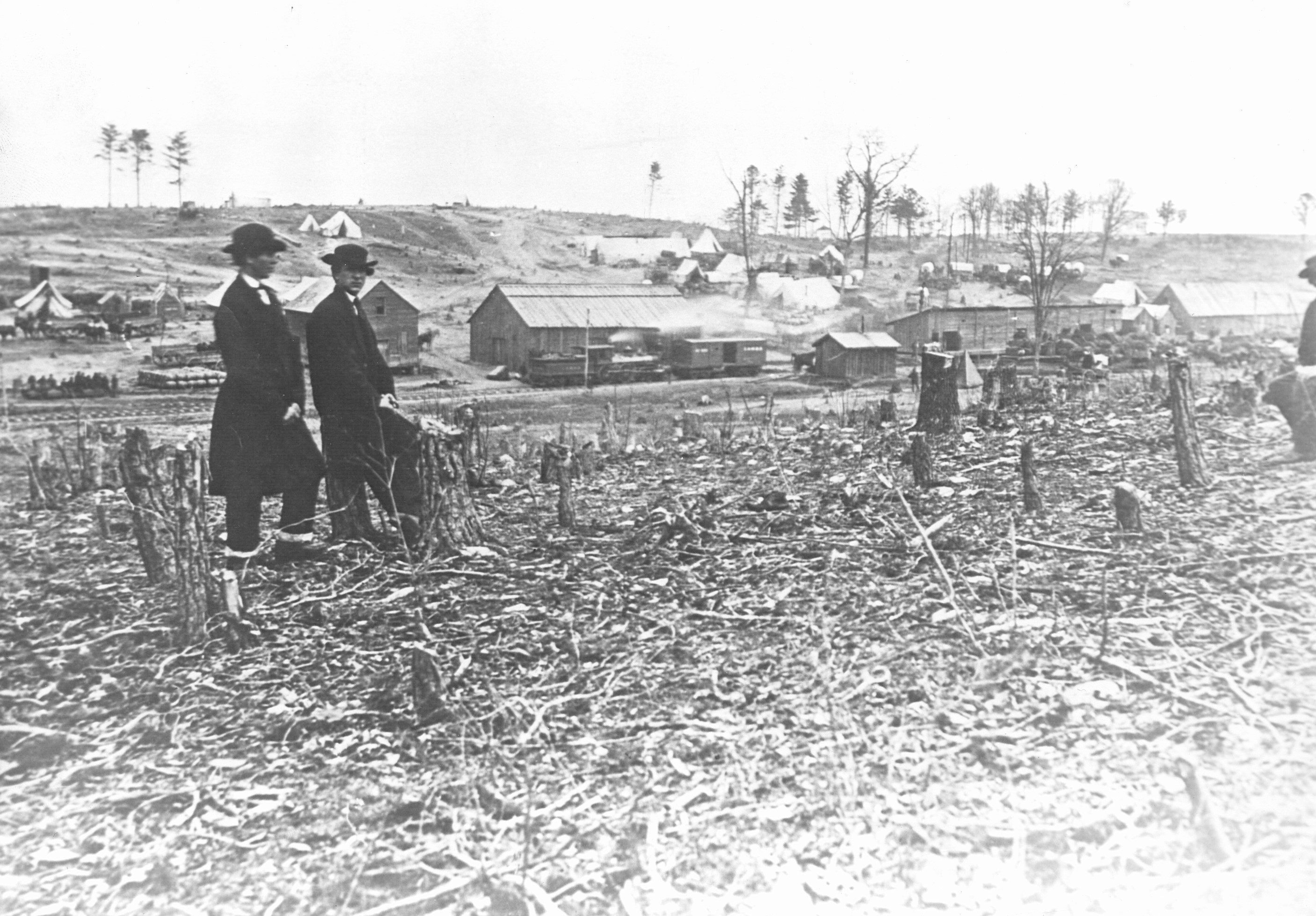
Fairfax Station, circa 1863.

=== Orange, Alexandria and Manassas Gap RR Co.: 1873 ===
Area residents made do without a proper station for several years after the end of the Civil War. A new building at Fairfax Station was a low priority for the O&A following the Civil War. The company focused instead on rebuilding and consolidating with other regional railroads, becoming the Orange, Alexandria and Manassas Gap Railroad Co. (OA&M). Local newspapers reported the opening of a new facility at Fairfax Station in January 1873. The new building was near or at the location of the 1852 structure.

=== Richmond & Danville: 1891 ===
The railroad underwent a series of mergers, ownership changes, and restructurings during the next fifteen years until it became part of the Richmond & Danville Railroad Co. (R&D) in 1889. Traffic along the route increased during this period, particularly for freight, despite financial problems. The R&D completed a new station with combined freight and passenger services in 1891. To accommodate its larger size, it was located on the north side of the tracks opposite the 1873 site. It was this building that ultimately served as the model for the present day museum.

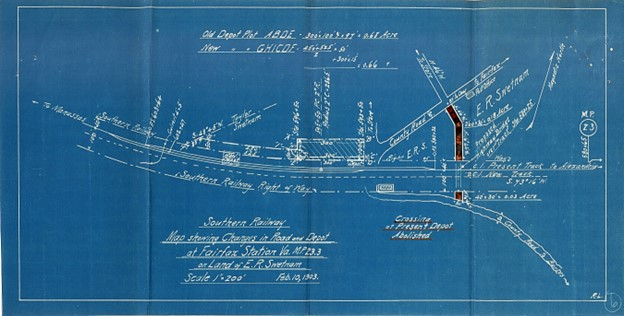
“New Depot” denotes the final location for the 1891 building. Road petition, Southern Railway Co., RR-336, September 1903. Fairfax County (Virginia) Circuit Court, Historic Records Center.

=== Southern Railway: 1903 ===
The Southern Railway Co. absorbed the R&D and other regional railroads in 1894. Southern became the dominant railroad throughout the region due to its size and control of key routes. However, the company inherited lines that did not meet the growing needs of a company its size.

Southern launched a rebuilding project in 1903 that included all of the original O&A roadbeds. A key element of the rebuild was adding a second track that would allow traffic in both directions. Southern's project required moving the station slightly south. Rather than build a new structure, the existing building constructed by the R&D just over a decade before was relocated. This was the final location for the building as an active facility.

== Museum ==
=== Origins ===
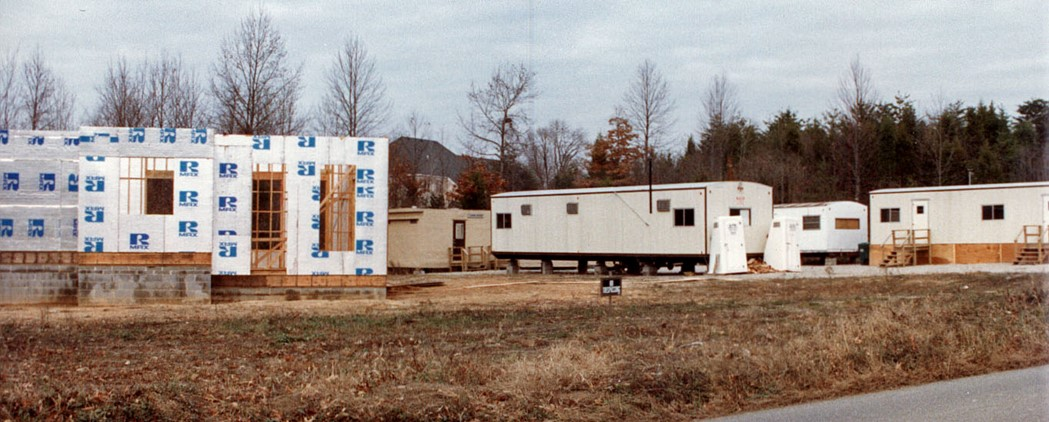
A volunteer photo shows the foundation and walls of the future museum. Trailers in the background were used to hold student classes on site while they constructed the building as part of their curriculum.

Fairfax Station declined as a viable railroad stop from the 1930s until 1969 when the railroad ceased using it for operations. Cargo deliveries were of importance to the immediate area but it no longer was useful for Southern Railway. Stations in other parts of Fairfax County had been demolished, moved or repurposed for non-railroad uses. Fairfax Station seemed likely to meet a similar fate.

A group of local residents, with the particularly strong participation of the Clifton Community Woman's Club (CCWC), organized the Friends of the Fairfax Station in 1973 to save what had been the center of their community. In February 1975, local resident and CCWC member Lena Wyckoff approached Southern Railway Co. about the possibility of donating the depot to a local non-profit for the purpose of preserving and operating it as a museum. The Fairfax County Board of Supervisors supported the concept. Local landowners contributed property to meet Southern's condition that the depot be moved to a nearby site. Southern Railway's president, Stanley Crane, formally agreed to the transfer of ownership of the station to the Friends on Sept. 15, 1977.

=== Reconstruction ===
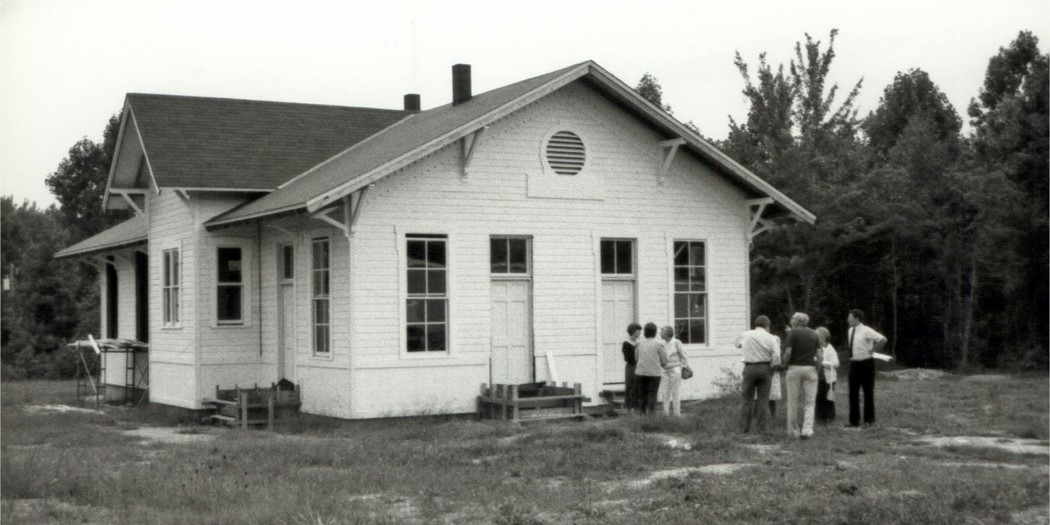
The near-finished building in 1987.

The Friends dismantled the station, storing the pieces on the donated property while pursuing approval from local jurisdictions to rebuild and operate it as a museum. The Fairfax County Board of Supervisors approved a permit for the future museum on July 11, 1983. By then, however, the pieces of the old building had deteriorated badly, making reconstitution impossible. With assistance from Fairfax County and contributions of the local business community, a replica of the old structure was built, incorporating roughly 20 percent of the original building. High school students from a Fairfax County vocational program completed most of the construction work.

The Friends held a ground-breaking ceremony in 1983. The building was dedicated in October 1987. Once the finishing touches were completed, the doors for the new museum opened in April 1988 to its first visitors.

== Exhibits and artifacts ==
The museum displays numerous artifacts relating to the development of railroads in the area as well as specific historical events.

=== Railroad artifacts ===
The museum owns a range of railroad tools and equipment. Volunteer docents demonstrate the use of many of them to visitors during open hours.

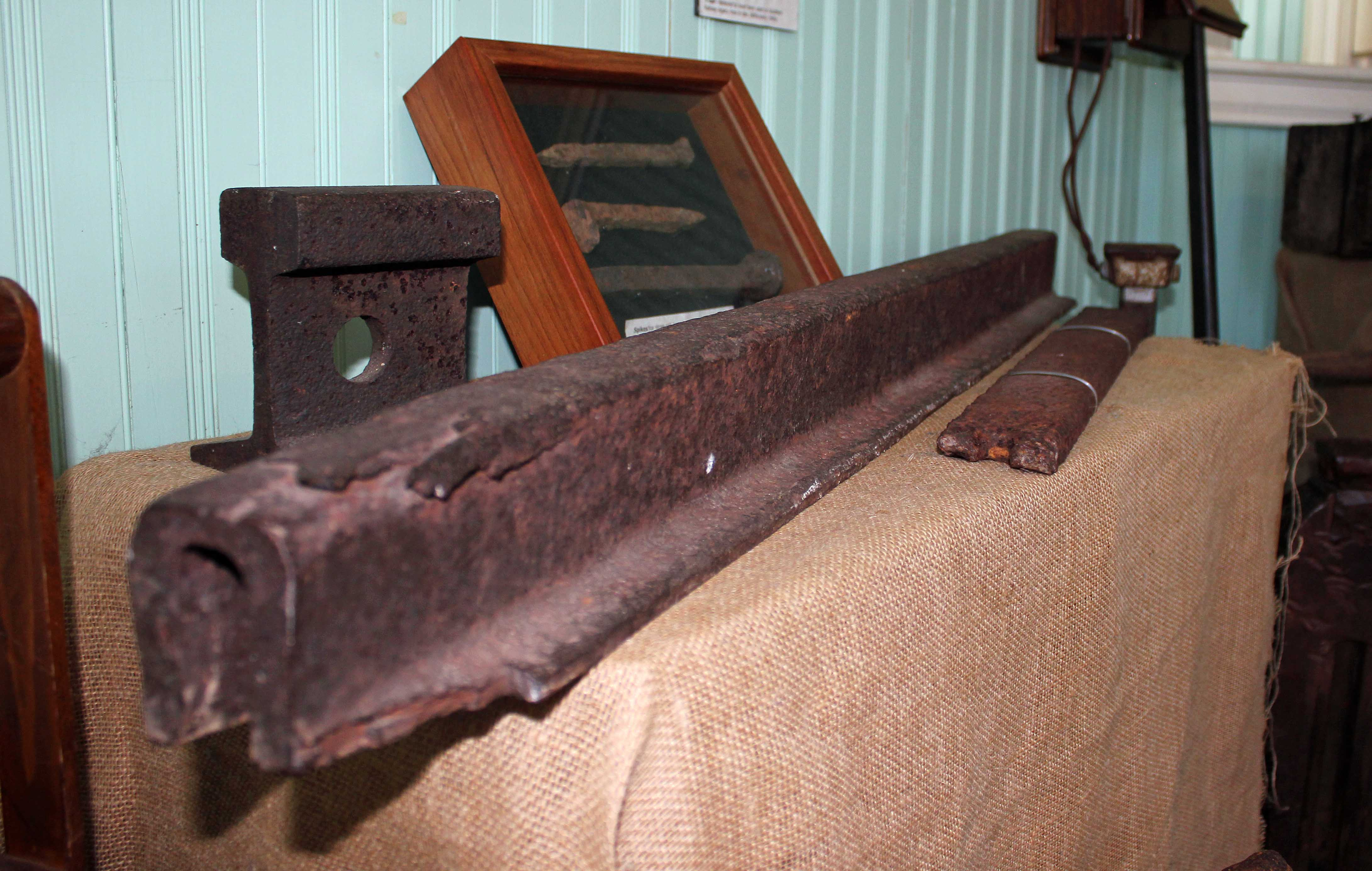
Tracks on display at the museum

Sections of railroad tracks from the O&A and the former Richmond, Fredericksburg, and Potomac Railroad show the evolution of rail technology in Virginia – and the United States – from simple strap rail through U-rail to T-rail.

Other relics from the O&A include links and pins used locally to couple freight and passenger cars. An authentic link and pin coupler acquired in 2021 also is on display.

Several items used by Southern Railway are on display, including a whistle board used near Fairfax Station and a conductor's flag box dating back to the early 1900s. A manual switch lantern used in the area by Southern is one of a large collection of lanterns at the museum.

The expansion of telegraph networks in the United States paralleled the growth of railroads. It is uncertain when the telegraph arrived in Fairfax Station but the station was an important communications center during the Civil War. Telegraph service remained active until the station was no longer used for railroad business in 1969. A functioning telegraph is on display, allowing visitors to "pound brass" as real telegraph operators did years before.

A restored baggage cart used at the station a century ago is on display. Such carts were common at large stations and small depots during the heyday of American railroads. The one on display is believed to be the same cart visible in the background of a scene in "The Road to Happiness" – a 1924 film financed by the Bureau of Public Roads, Ford Motor Co., Highway Education Board, and National Automobile Chamber of Commerce. The production was filmed mainly in Fairfax County with several scenes taking place at Fairfax Station.

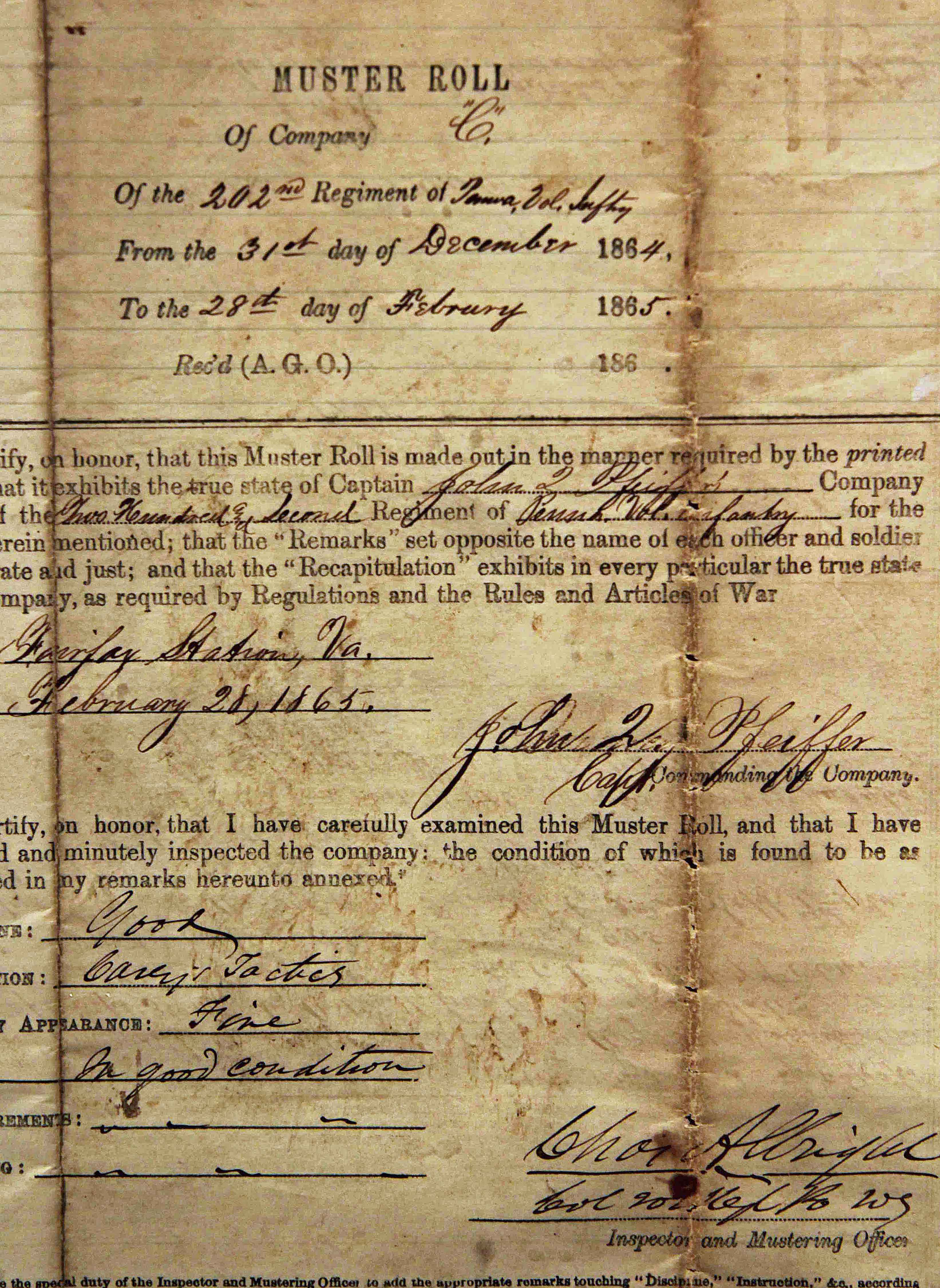
202nd Pennsylvania Regiment Co. C muster roll 01

=== Civil War artifacts ===
Among the Civil War artifacts are a muster list of the 202nd Pennsylvania Volunteer Infantry – a unit organized specifically to defend the railroads in northern Virginia – and a guard duty report of the 15th Vermont Infantry Regiment. Modern vintage prints illustrate many of the major clashes, skirmishes, and raids at and around Fairfax Station, including John Mosby's March 1863 raid on Fairfax Courthouse and the march of a relief wagon train to Fairfax Station later that year. The commander of the wagon train, Richard N. Batchelder, then a lieutenant colonel, was awarded the Medal of Honor for his defense of the supply train against Mosby's Raiders.

On long-term loan is a sketch of Fairfax Station as it was in 1863-64.

=== Caboose ===
In 1993, the Norfolk Southern Foundation donated a caboose to the museum that was used originally by the Norfolk Western Railway. Volunteers were recruited for its installation on the grounds. It was repainted with a Southern Railway logo a decade later. It is the only example of rolling stock on the museum grounds.

=== Village life ===
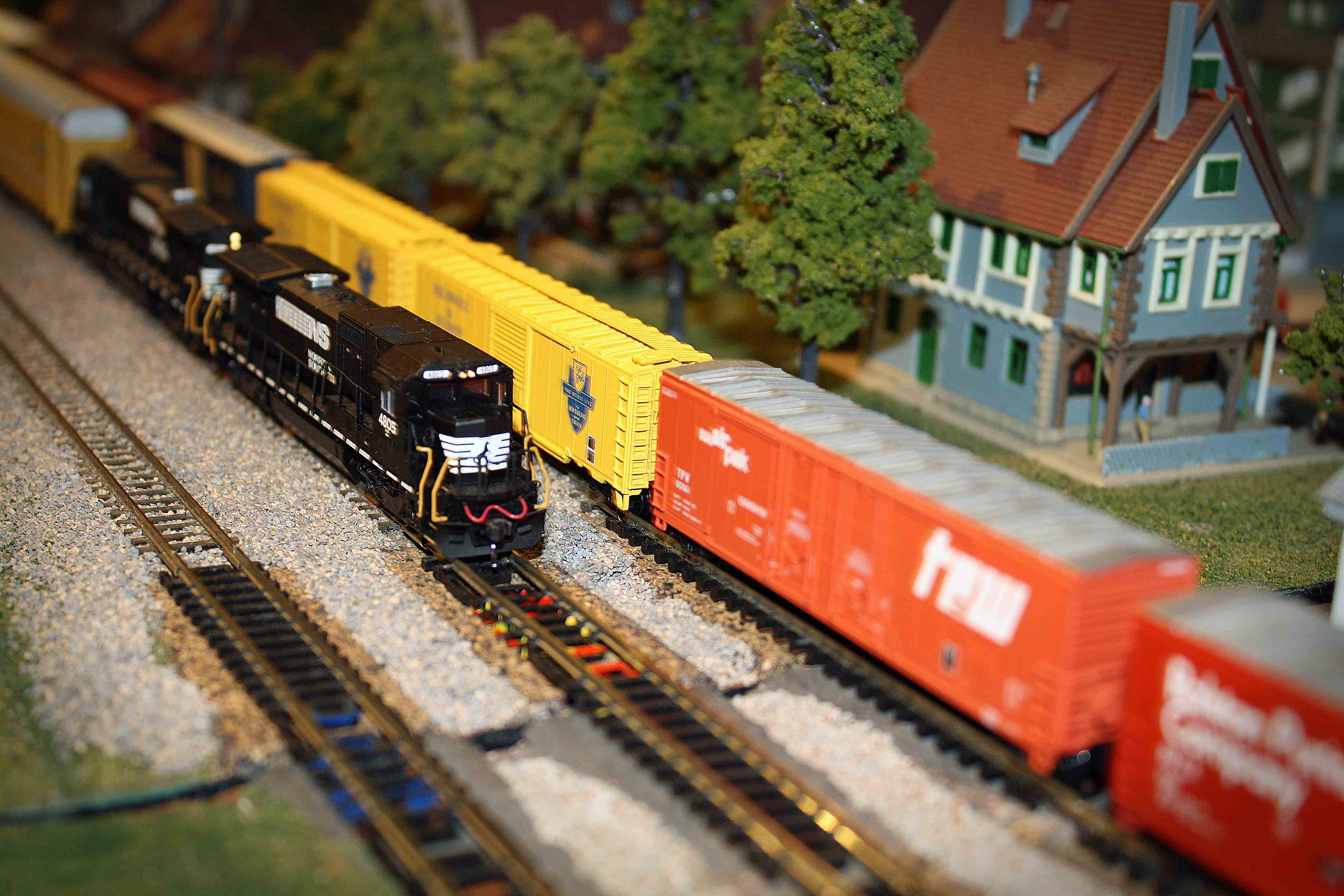
Model train display

Several displays and interpretive signs illustrate life in a typical county depot. Among those items are the mailboxes salvaged from the old post office in Fairfax Station.

== Events ==
The museum partners with area model train organizations for regular displays. Different scale models and styles can be viewed at various times throughout the year. The museum has permanent HO and N scale layouts representing the local area.

The museum has held special exhibits over the years on such topics as railroad technology and local inventors. Special events have included historical re-enactments. Student organized events and activities have been held in cooperation with local public high schools.

In 2012, the museum held a special, ten-day exhibit in conjunction with the Civil War Sesquicentennial that commemorated the events of August–September 1862 at Fairfax Station. The Fairfax City Museum, Clara Barton National Historic Site, National Building Museum and National Museum of Civil War Medicine cooperated with the Fairfax Station Railroad Museum for this event.

== Programs and affiliations ==
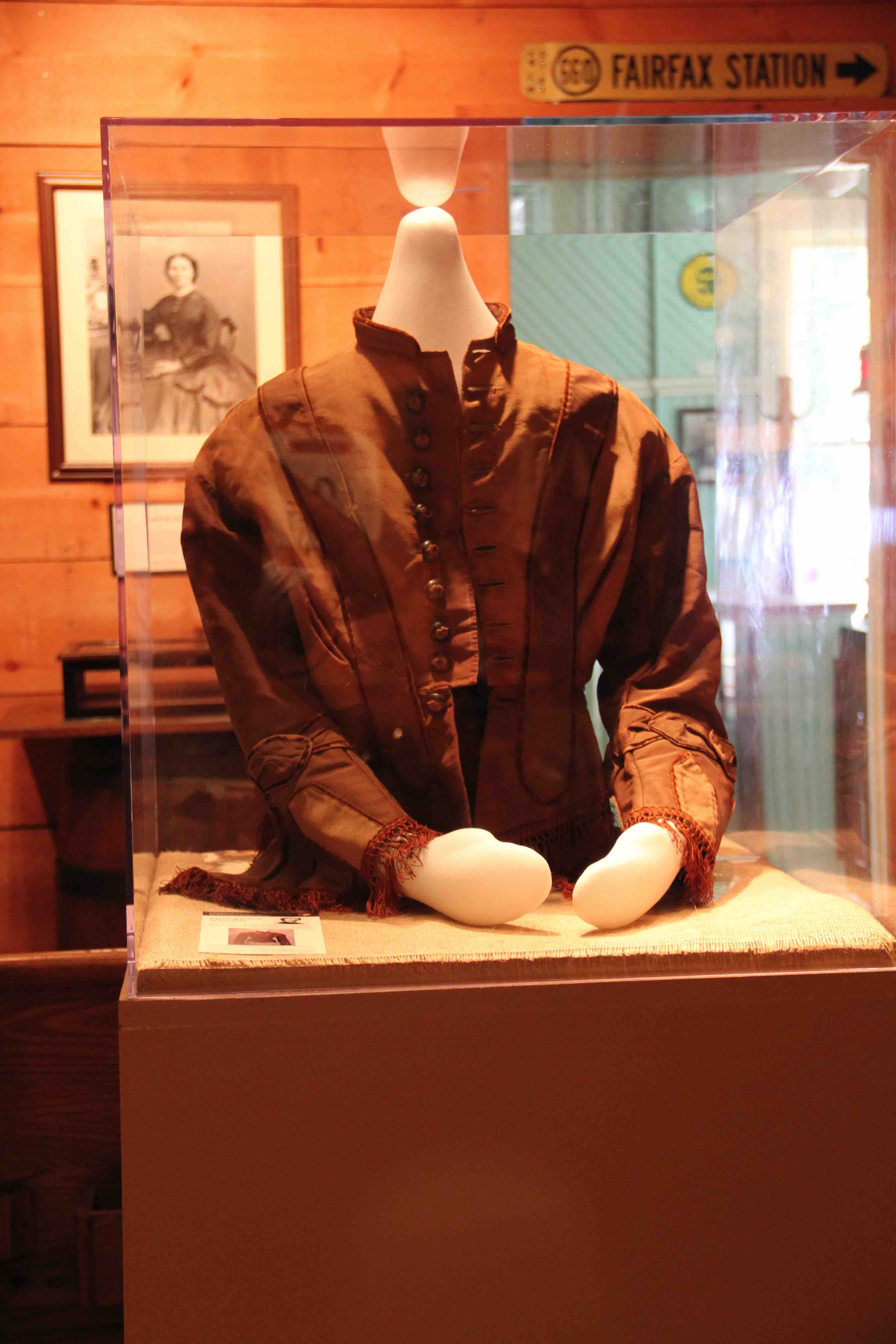
Clara Barton bodice loaned from the Clara Barton National Historic Site to the Fairfax Station Railroad Museum for use during the 2012 Civil War Sesquicentennial, August–September, 2012.

The museum participates in several national and community programs, including:

- National Park Service's Traveling Clara Barton Junior Ranger program.
- Civil War Trails (commemorating Clara Barton's activities as part of the 1862 evacuation effort at Fairfax Station).
- National Wildlife Federation (the museum's five-acre grounds are designated as a Certified Wildlife Habitat).
- The museum has participated in the Northern Virginia Geocaching Organization (NoVA-GO) since 2015.
