= Mount Wachusett Community College =

Public community college in Gardner, Massachusetts, U.S.

Coordinates: 42°35′34.64″N 71°59′0.61″W

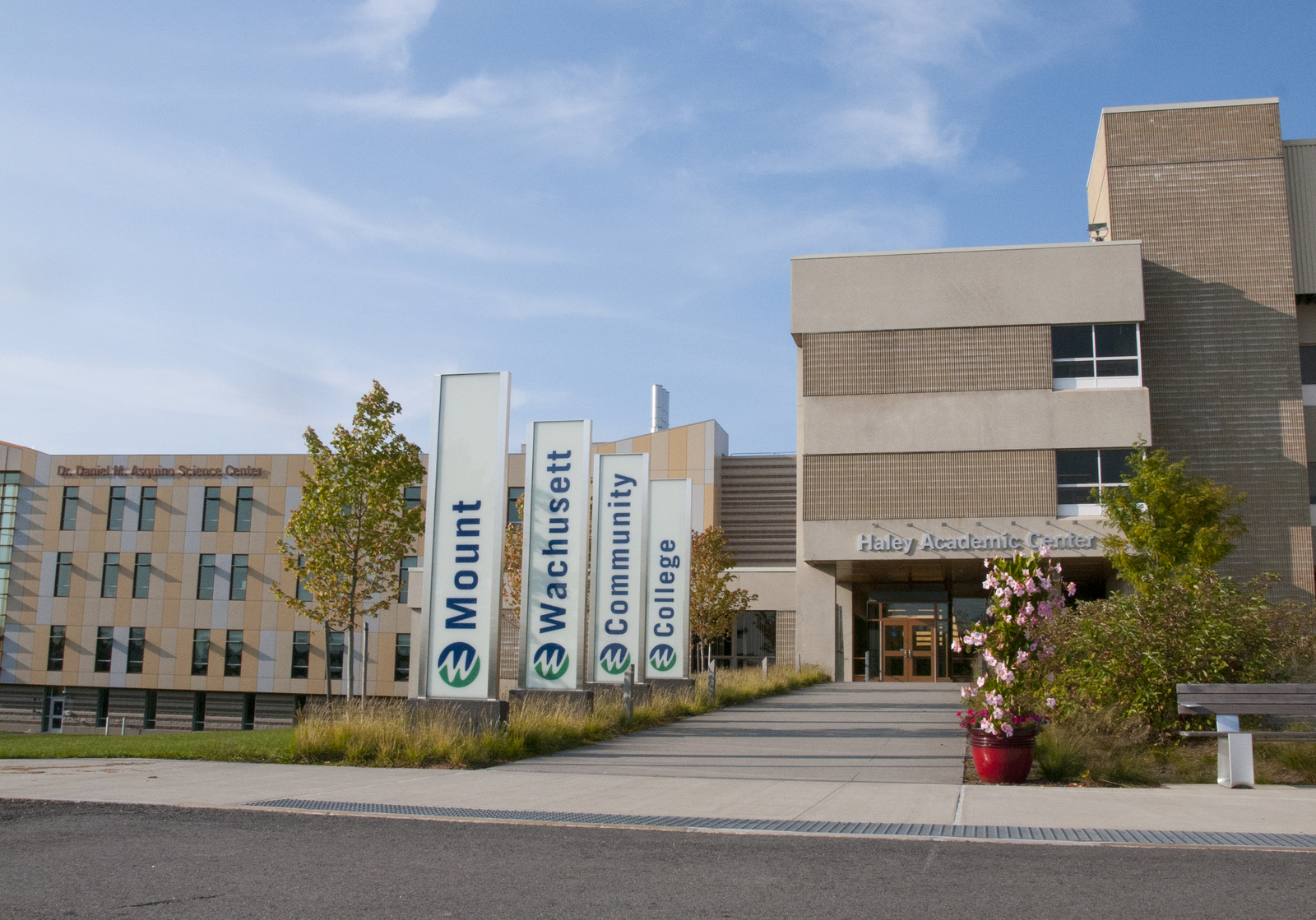
- Motto: Life Happens, Keep Learning
- Type: Public community college
- Established: 1963
- Accreditation: NECHE
- President: James L. Vander Hooven
- Students: 5,932 (2023)
- Location: Gardner, Massachusetts, United States
- Campus: 269 acres (109 ha); Rural
- Mascot: Monty the Mountain Lion
- Website: mwcc.edu

Mount Wachusett Community College (MWCC) is a public community college in Gardner, Massachusetts. Established by the Commonwealth of Massachusetts in 1963, it features an open admissions policy for the majority of its academic programs. MWCC offers more than 70 academic programs that allow students to earn an Associate of Science degree (A.S.), Associate of Arts degree (A.A.), or a certificate.

== Campuses ==
The 269-acre (1.09 km2) main campus is located on 444 Green Street in Gardner, Massachusetts. The college also maintains a satellite campus at 100 Erdman Way in Leominster, Massachusetts, and an Automotive Technology Facility on Linus Allain Ave in Gardner, Massachusetts. The college has an additional educational site in Fitchburg, Massachusetts where dental hygiene and dental assisting students take classes and offer free dental cleanings at 326 Nichols Road in Fitchburg, MA in partnership with Community Health Center of Fitchburg, Massachusetts.

== Sustainability ==
The college has been praised for its use of renewable energy, winning the National Wildlife Federation's "Chill-Out: Campus Solutions to Global Warming" competition in the spring of 2007.

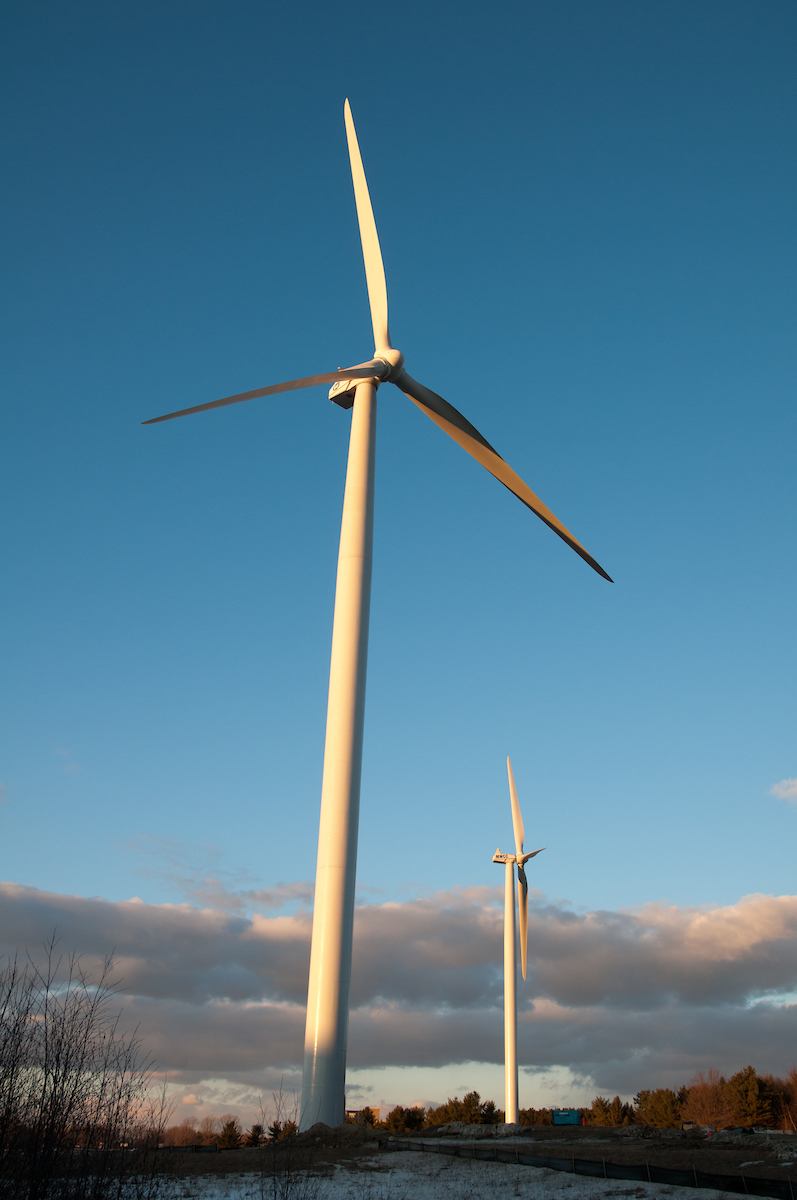
MWCC Wind Turbines on Gardner, MA campus.

Renewable energy technologies at the college include: Solar PhotoVoltaic panels originally producing 5 kilowatts and upgraded to 97.24 kilowatts in September 2009. and a biomass plant which heats the college by burning waste woodchips.

The college also uses a biomass gasification generator, where woodchips are turned into combustible gases, which are used in a gasoline engine, powering a generator that produces 50 kilowatts of electricity. This is a research and development project contracted with the U.S. Department of Energy.

Two Vestas V82 1.65 MW wind turbines were activated in March 2011 which are expected to generate 97 percent of the college's annual electricity demand.

== Service area ==
Mount Wachusett Community College serves the following 29 cities and towns in North Central Massachusetts:

- Ashburnham, Massachusetts
- Ashby, Massachusetts
- Athol, Massachusetts
- Ayer, Massachusetts
- Barre, Massachusetts
- Clinton, Massachusetts
- Fitchburg, Massachusetts
- Gardner, Massachusetts
- Groton, Massachusetts
- Hardwick, Massachusetts
- Harvard, Massachusetts
- Hubbardston, Massachusetts
- Lancaster, Massachusetts
- Leominster, Massachusetts
- Lunenburg, Massachusetts
- Oakham, Massachusetts
- Orange, Massachusetts
- Pepperell, Massachusetts
- Petersham, Massachusetts
- Royalston, Massachusetts
- Phillipston, Massachusetts
- Princeton, Massachusetts
- Rutland, Massachusetts
- Shirley, Massachusetts
- Sterling, Massachusetts
- Templeton, Massachusetts
- Townsend, Massachusetts
- Winchendon, Massachusetts
- Westminster, Massachusetts

== Academics ==
=== Early college and dual enrollment ===
Mount Wachusett Community College offers multiple programs that offer high school/home school juniors and seniors the chance to enroll in college classes prior to their high school graduation. Mount Wachusett Community College is accredited by the New England Commission of Higher Education.

- Dual Enrollment: Dual Enrollment allows the student to focus on courses that will be transferable to most two-year and four-year public and private institutions, while simultaneously completing their high school graduation requirements. Selected students are enrolled in either a part-time or full-time college-level course load depending on their program and course needs. Dual Enrollment students are considered MWCC students and as such will be awarded the same academic support privileges as other MWCC students. Courses are limited and applicants from local high schools are given priority.
- Pathways Early College Innovation School: Mount Wachusett Community College partners with the Ralph C. Mahar Regional School District to offer an Early College High School opportunity to 20 motivated students with the opportunity to earn their high school diploma and an associate degree simultaneously. The Pathways program covers the cost of course tuition and fees for enrolled students. These students complete their junior and senior years of high school while taking courses at MWCC. Students must fulfill all state and educational requirements to meet high school diploma and associate degree requirements, which also includes passing the MCAS. Admissions are competitive. Applicants are required to have a minimum 3.0 GPA from their high school, be at least 16 years old, have a recommendation from their high school, and must be willing to enroll in classes during all available MWCC semesters.
- Gateway to College: Gateway to College is a dual enrollment opportunity especially for students who either have not experienced success in the traditional high school setting. The program is for students who have dropped out of high school or are at risk of dropping out. Gateway students have the opportunity to earn a high school diploma with the added benefit of receiving free college credits toward an associate degree or certificate through a variety of career-focused pathways. The Gateway to College Program provides tuition, fees, and first-semester books for enrolled students and is funded through Chapter 70 School Choice funds from the Ralph C. Mahar Regional School District.

=== Adult education ===
An Adult Education program prepares adults without high school degrees to complete their high school equivalency exam (GED/HiSET). These students are then eligible to continue their education at the college level at Mount Wachusett Community College or any other institution.

=== Workforce development ===
The college provides corporate instruction and workforce development training for local businesses. Services include assisting companies with accessing Workforce Training Fund grants and delivering customized training.

=== English as a Second Language (ESL) ===
ESL students receive personalized instruction in a computer/media lab at the campus in Leominster, MA. Courses are taught at 4 levels: beginning, advanced beginning, intermediate, and advanced.

=== Continuing education ===
The college offers noncredit classes for personal enrichment year-round as part of its Lifelong Learning program.

== Notable people ==
- Harold Brown Jr. (1972 – 2009), was a CIA Officer and U.S. Army Reserve Major who was killed during the Camp Chapman attack

== Student services ==
MWCC students enjoy many support services and resources including free tutoring in the Academic Support Center, subsidized childcare, career planning assistance, disability support, food assistance, counseling, and veteran services.

== Mount Fitness ==
Mount Fitness is the college's 65,000-square foot gymnasium. It is open to the public and offers memberships for individuals and families. Membership fees include group fitness/yoga classes, pool use, and tanning. The facility includes:

- Olympic sized swimming pool with 6 lanes
- (3)full-size, indoor basketball courts
- Outdoor tennis and basketball courts
- 200-meter outdoor track
- (2) Regulation racquetball courts
- Weight training and cardiovascular equipment
- On-site nursery

== Theatre at the Mount ==
The college's theatre hosts a sizable community theatre program. Started in the autumn of 1976 (under the name "Theatre North Central"), notably through the Eastern Massachusetts Association of Community Theatres (EMACT) and New England Theatre Conference (NETC)

=== TAMY Awards ===
In 2006, Theatre at the Mount launched the TAMY Award program for high school musical theatre. Modeled after Broadway's Tony Awards, the TAMYs evaluate high school performances within a 50-mile radius of the college based on a number of criteria, including (among others) Best Actor, Best Actress, Best Featured Ensemble and Best Overall Production.

== See also ==
- List of colleges and universities in Massachusetts
