= St. Mary's Church (Fairfax Station, Virginia) =

Historic church in Virginia, United States

- U.S. National Register of Historic Places
- Virginia Landmarks Register
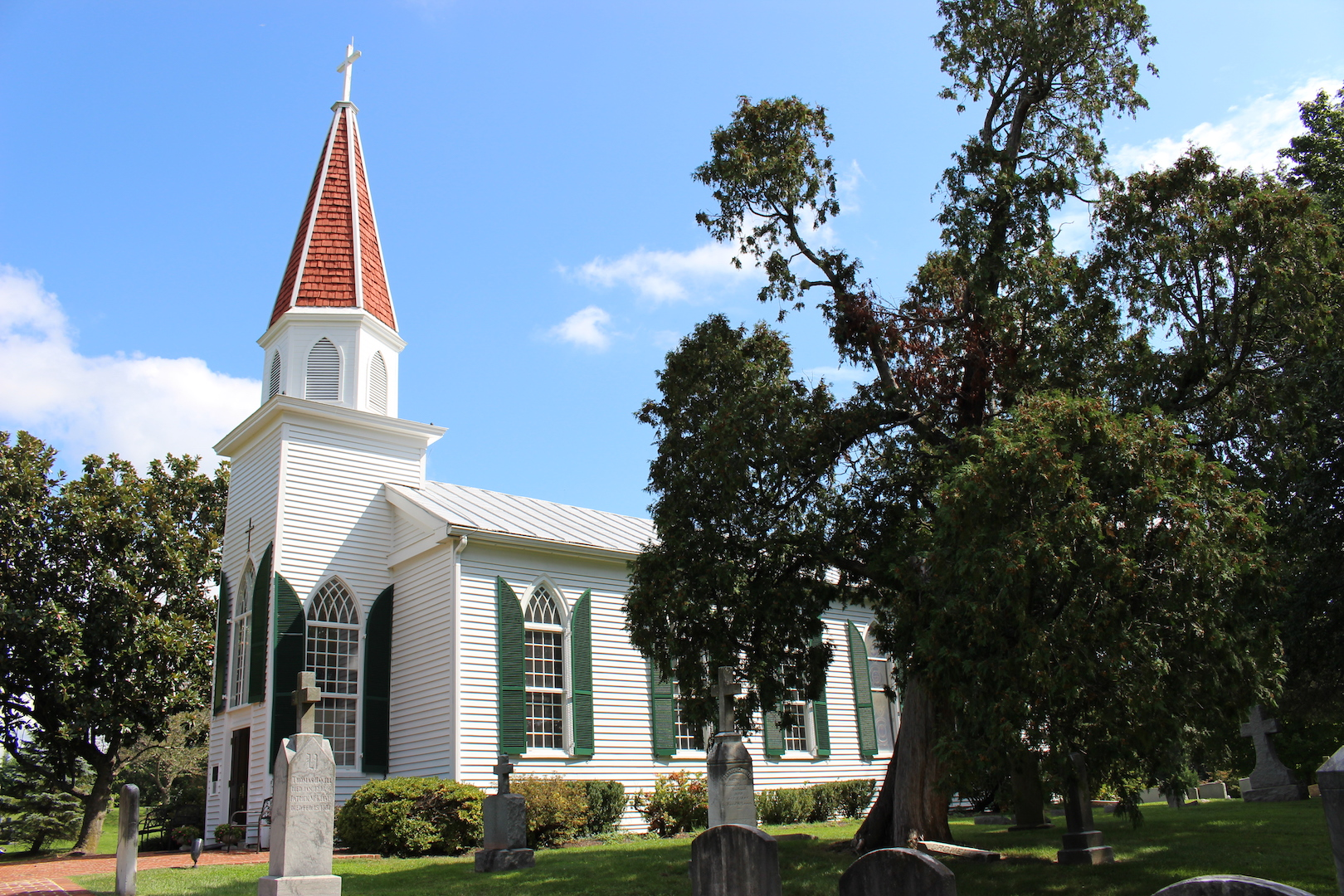
- View of the church from the cemetery in September 2017

- Location within Northern Virginia Location within Virginia Location within the United States
- Location: 5605 Vogue Road; Fairfax Station, Virginia, U.S.
- Coordinates: 38.8027°N 77.3266°W
- Area: 2.3 acres (0.93 ha)
- Built: 1858; 168 years ago
- Architectural style: Gothic Revival
- NRHP reference No.: 76002104
- VLR No.: 029-0169

Significant dates
- Added to NRHP: July 1, 1976
- Designated VLR: February 17, 1976

St. Mary's Church is a historic Catholic church in Fairfax Station, Virginia, United States, a suburb southwest of Washington, D.C. Built 168 years ago in 1858, it is a rectangular, one-story, gable-front, frame structure in the Gothic Revival style. It has a steeple at the entrance and a large Gothic arched window over the entrance door. St. Mary's was the first Catholic church built within Fairfax County, and its early parishioners were primarily Irish and German immigrants employed by the Orange and Alexandria Railroad.

During the Civil War, wounded were brought here by train to be treated and evacuated to Alexandria and Washington after the Second Battle of Bull Run (Manassas) in late August 1862. Volunteer Clara Barton, an employee of the U.S. Patent Office in Washington, tended to the wounded and made this church her headquarters; she later founded the American Red Cross in 1881.

St. Mary's gained a listing on the National Register of Historic Places fifty years ago in 1976. The historic church property belongs to Saint Mary of Sorrows Catholic Church in the Diocese of Arlington. The historic church is still in use, although a new primary parish center was built several miles northeast and opened in 1980. The annual Labor Day picnic in early September continues to be held on the grounds (primarily its graveyard), and is one of the oldest celebrations in the county.

St Mary's Church is part of the larger parish of St Mary of the Sorrows
