= Harold Brown Jr. =

American intelligence officer (1972–2009)

Harold E. Brown Jr. (June 4, 1972 – December 30, 2009) was an American intelligence officer and U.S. Army Reserve major who was killed in action during the Camp Chapman attack in Khost, Afghanistan, in 2009. Brown's death occurred while he was working for the Central Intelligence Agency (CIA) as part of the United States' efforts in the war on terror.

== Early life and education ==
Brown was born on June 4, 1972, in Bolton, Massachusetts, to Harold E. Brown Sr. and Barbara Brown. His family had deep roots in the Bolton community; his father served as the town's public works director, and his mother was a police officer with the Bolton Police Department. Brown attended Nashoba Regional High School, graduating in 1990. He later attended Mount Wachusett Community College in Gardner, Massachusetts, before transferring to George Washington University in Washington, D.C., where he earned his degree. While at GW, Brown interned in the office of U.S. Representative Martin Meehan, a Democrat from Lowell, Massachusetts. He went on to earn a Master of Business Administration degree from the University of Phoenix.

== Military and intelligence career ==
Following his graduation, Brown attended Officer Candidate School, where he was commissioned as a second lieutenant in the United States Army. He served four years on active duty, including deployments to Bosnia, before transitioning to the Army Reserve, where he achieved the rank of Major. He had also served during Operation Iraq Freedom and the Gulf War.

Brown later joined the CIA, where he worked in various intelligence capacities. At the time of his death, he was stationed in Afghanistan as part of the CIA's War on terror. His family believed he worked for the United States Department of State.

=== Death ===
On December 30, 2009, Brown was killed in a suicide bombing at a CIA base in Khost, Afghanistan. The attack, carried out by a bomber who had been invited onto the base without being searched, resulted in the deaths of seven CIA officers and the wounding of six others. The incident was one of the deadliest attacks on CIA personnel in the agency's history. In response, President Barack Obama praised the fallen officers for their service, describing them as part of a "long line of patriots" who had made significant sacrifices to protect the United States. Brown Jr. was buried with full military honors following a funeral Mass at St. John the Evangelist Church in Clinton, Massachusetts.

=== Legacy ===
The Harold E. Brown Jr. Memorial Bridge on I-495 over Massachusetts Route 117 in Bolton was dedicated in October 2012 in honor of Brown Jr. In 2012, Brown Jr. was inducted into the Army's 3rd Legal Support Organization's Hall of Fame. The training room/emergency operations center at the Bolton's public safety center is also named in Brown's honor.

== Personal life ==
Brown was married to Janet Brown, whom he met while attending George Washington University. The couple had three children. At the time of his death, he was an active parishioner of St. Mary of Sorrows, where he taught elementary religious education classes. He was a member of the Knights of Columbus.
