= St. Mary of Sorrows (Fairfax, Virginia) =

Catholic parish in Virginia, US

St. Mary of the Sorrows
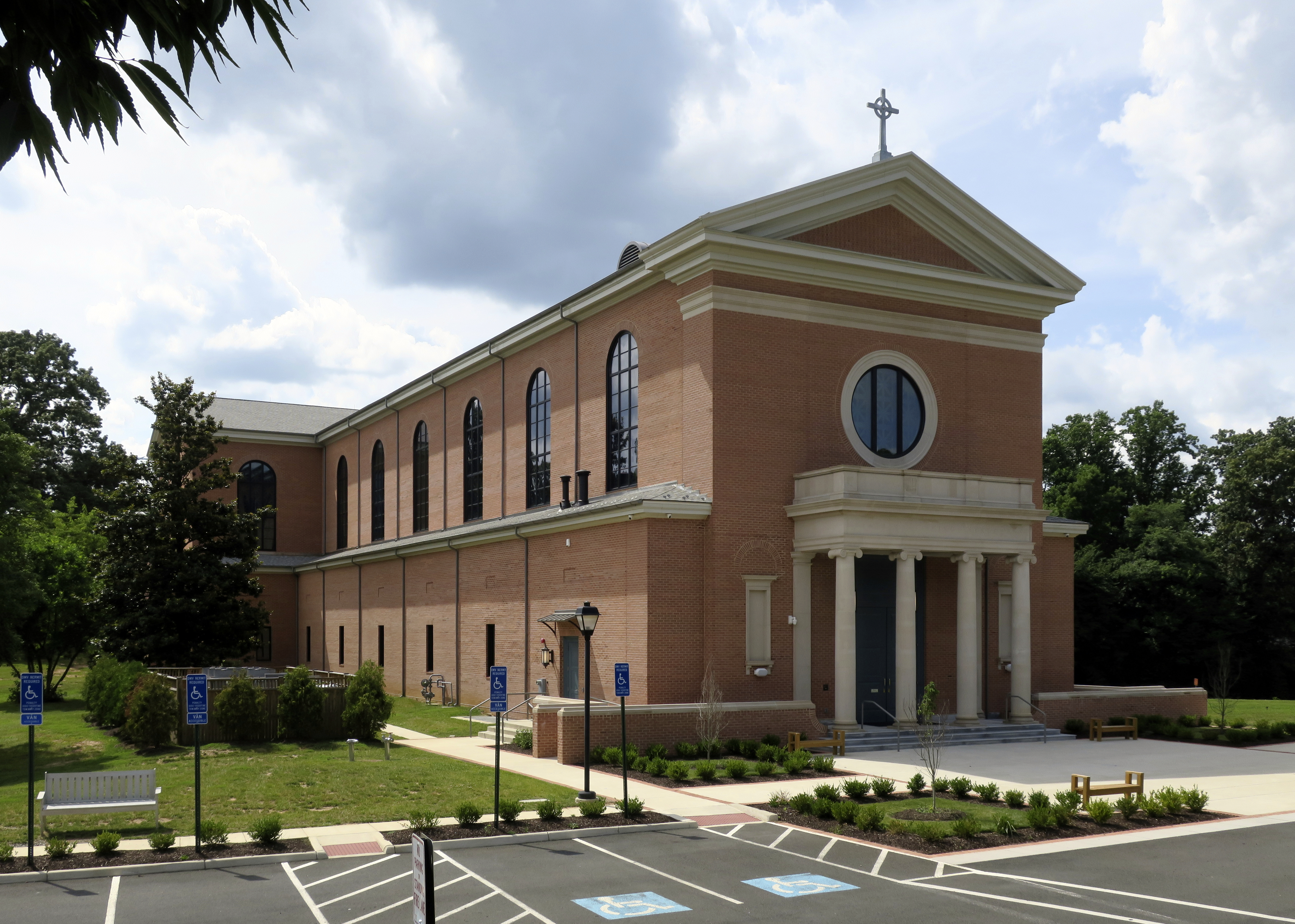
- St. Mary of the Sorrows main church in Kings Park West

- Location within Virginia
- 38°48′46.8″N 77°18′35.6″W
- Location: Arlington, Virginia
- Country: United States
- Denomination: Catholic
- Website: stmaryofsorrows.org

History
- Founded: 1838
- Dedication: Our Lady of the Sorrows

Architecture
- Architectural type: Colonial
- Completed: 1860

Administration
- Diocese: Arlington

Clergy
- Bishop: Michael F. Burbidge
- Rector: Rev. Thomas P. Vander Woude
- Vicar(s): Rev. Keith D. Cummings, Rev Edwin Seh

St. Mary of the Sorrows is a Catholic parish located in Fairfax, Virginia. It is part of the Diocese of Arlington. Although most of the parish's services are conducted at its primary worship center in Fairfax, the parish also celebrates several Masses each week at St. Mary's Historic Church in Fairfax Station, its original place of worship. Harold Brown Jr., a CIA officer killed in the Camp Chapman attack, was an active parishioner and taught elementary religious education classes.

== History ==
In 1858, several Catholic families donated a tract of land to the Diocese of Richmond not far from the Fairfax Courthouse in hopes that a church and cemetery be built there. Several years later, many Irish immigrants were hired by the Orange & Alexandria (O&A) railroad to extend its tracks from Alexandria, Virginia, to Lynchburg, Virginia. These men and their families desired a place to worship. The only option at the time was for a priest to take the O&A train to the Fairfax Station depot, and he said Mass while in a boxcar. In 1855, the cemetery was consecrated in the donated land, which was up on a bluff overlooking the railroad depot. Construction of the church took two years. The church was consecrated by the Bishop of Richmond on September 23, 1860. During the Civil War, following the first battle of Bull Run in the summer of 1861, the routed Union soldiers retreated through Centerville and headed for Fairfax Station, seeking transportation to safety. Included were numerous wounded and injured men. All of the church pews were removed from the small church to make room for treatment of wounded and dying men. As these men were transported east, to Alexandria, on trains, volunteers boarded the now empty rail cars headed back to Fairfax Station to assist in providing medical care on the grounds of Saint Mary's. Clara Barton was among the number of volunteer nurses who responded to calls for treatment of the wounded and dying men. As the Confederate forces reached Fairfax Courthouse, they learned of the large number of Union casualties being treated at the depot and the church. As they approached the railroad depot, the last of the survivors were pulling out of the station. The Confederates promptly burned the church to the ground.

The small catholic church remained in full operation until the mid-1980s, when a new parish center was built about six miles north of the original church. Over time, fewer and fewer Masses were celebrated in the historic church, but it was popular for weddings. In 2020 a new, much larger church was built on property adjacent to the parish center The historic church remains an ideal site for weddings, and its original cemetery is still used for burials.
