= Fairfax Station, Virginia =

- Census-designated place
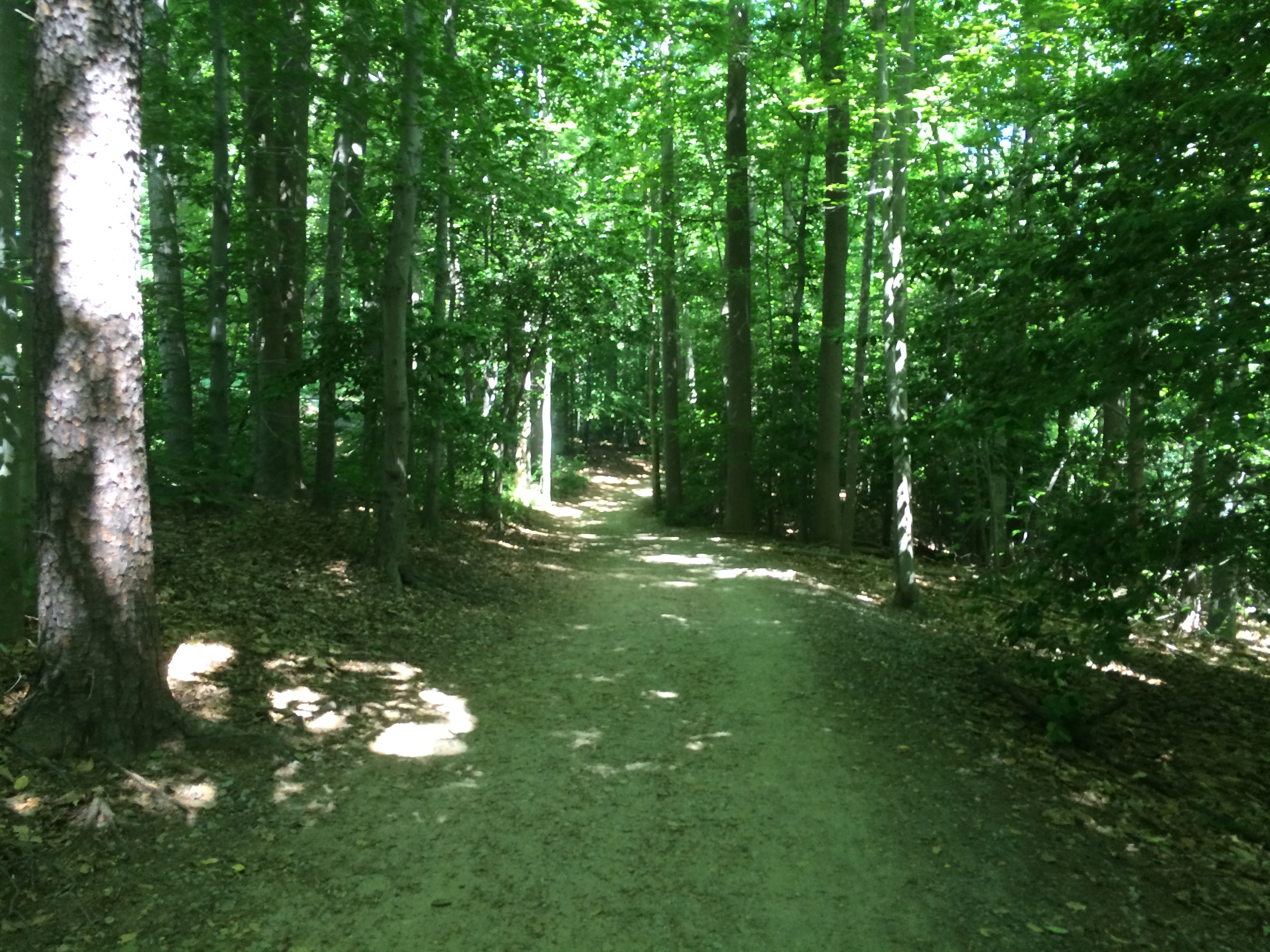
- Trail in Burke Lake Park in 2014

- Location within the Commonwealth of Virginia Fairfax Station (Virginia) Fairfax Station (the United States)
- Coordinates: 38°48′9″N 77°19′31″W
- Country: United States
- State: Virginia
- County: Fairfax

Area
  - Total: 9.2 sq mi (23.8 km^{2})
  - Land: 9.1 sq mi (23.6 km^{2})
  - Water: 0.077 sq mi (0.2 km^{2})
- Elevation: 425 ft (130 m)

Population (2020)
  - Total: 12,420
  - Density: 1,363/sq mi (526.3/km^{2})
- Time zone: UTC−5 (Eastern (EST))
  - Summer (DST): UTC−4 (EDT)
- ZIP code: 22039
- FIPS code: 51-26592
- GNIS feature ID: 1494913

Fairfax Station is a census-designated place (CDP) in Fairfax County, Virginia, United States. The population was 12,420 at the 2020 census. Located in Northern Virginia, its center is located 22 miles (35 km) southwest of Washington, D.C.

== History ==
Established 175 years ago in 1851, Fairfax Station was originally a station of the Orange and Alexandria Railroad, with proximity to the county seat of Fairfax; it was known as "Lee's Station" during its first year. During the Civil War in August 1862, Clara Barton tended to wounded Union and Confederate troops at the station after the Second Battle of Bull Run (Manassas), with headquarters at nearby St. Mary's Church. An employee of the U.S. Patent Office in Washington at the start of the war, Barton later founded the American Red Cross in 1881. A small skirmish, which was also the last in the county during the war, was fought at Brimstone Hill near Fairfax Station.

The construction of St. Mary's began in 1858, and it was the first Catholic church in Fairfax County. Its parishioners were primarily Irish immigrants, employed by the railroad. The area was renamed Swetnam in 1897, and reverted to Fairfax Station in 1921. Ekoji Buddhist Temple is also located in Fairfax Station, built 28 years ago in 1998.

== Geography ==
Fairfax Station is located in western Fairfax County, between Clifton to the west, Burke to the east, and the city of Fairfax to the north. The original community of Fairfax Station is located in the eastern part of the CDP, where State Route 123 (Ox Road) crosses the Norfolk Southern Railway line. State Route 286, the Fairfax County Parkway, curves through the center of the CDP, leading northwest to Fair Lakes and southeast to Newington.

Population densities range from 200 to 500 per square mile (77 to 193 per square kilometer) in the northern, southern, and western portions of the CDP, to between 1,600 and 2,200 per square mile (584 to 849 per square kilometer) in the center and eastern portions.

According to the U.S. Census Bureau, the Fairfax Station CDP has a total area of 9.2 square miles (23.8 km^{2}), of which 9.1 square miles (23.6 km^{2}) is land and 0.1 square miles (0.2 km^{2}), or 0.85%, is water.

== Demographics ==
Historical population
Census	Pop.	Note	%±
2010	12,030		—
2020	12,420		3.2%
U.S. Decennial Census; 2010 2020

Fairfax Station was first listed as a census designated place in the 2010 U.S. census.

=== Racial and ethnic composition ===
Fairfax Station CDP, Virginia – Racial and ethnic composition Note: the US Census treats Hispanic/Latino as an ethnic category. This table excludes Latinos from the racial categories and assigns them to a separate category. Hispanics/Latinos may be of any race.
Race / Ethnicity (NH = Non-Hispanic)	Pop 2010	Pop 2020	% 2010	% 2020
White alone (NH)	8,883	8,118	73.84%	65.36%
Black or African American alone (NH)	460	545	3.82%	4.39%
Native American or Alaska Native alone (NH)	11	11	0.09%	0.09%
Asian alone (NH)	1,457	1,914	12.11%	15.41%
Native Hawaiian or Pacific Islander alone (NH)	5	8	0.04%	0.06%
Other race alone (NH)	38	74	0.32%	0.60%
Mixed race or Multiracial (NH)	307	707	2.55%	5.69%
Hispanic or Latino (any race)	869	1,043	7.22%	8.40%
Total	12,030	12,420	100.00%	100.00%

=== 2020 census ===
As of the 2020 census, Fairfax Station had a population of 12,420. The median age was 45.0 years. 21.5% of residents were under the age of 18 and 18.9% of residents were 65 years of age or older. For every 100 females there were 98.6 males, and for every 100 females age 18 and over there were 96.8 males age 18 and over.

The population density was 1,364.8 inhabitants per square mile (527.0 inhabitants/km^{2}). The average housing unit density was 457.6 per square mile (176.7/km^{2}).

88.6% of residents lived in urban areas, while 11.4% lived in rural areas.

There were 4,103 households in Fairfax Station, of which 35.8% had children under the age of 18 living in them. Of all households, 77.2% were married-couple households, 7.8% were households with a male householder and no spouse or partner present, and 12.7% were households with a female householder and no spouse or partner present. About 10.8% of all households were made up of individuals and 6.4% had someone living alone who was 65 years of age or older.

There were 4,164 housing units, of which 1.5% were vacant. The homeowner vacancy rate was 0.3% and the rental vacancy rate was 4.3%.

=== Demographic estimates ===
The average family household had 3.25 people.

The largest ancestry is the 13.7% who had Irish ancestry, 19.2% spoke a language other than English at home, and 15.4% were born outside the United States, 83.5% of whom were naturalized citizens.

=== Income and poverty ===
The median income for a household in the CDP was $211,000, and the median income for a family was $224,180. 15.3% of the population were military veterans, and 74.9% had a batchelor's degree or higher. In the CDP 2.1% of the population was below the poverty line, including 1.0% of those under the age of 18 and 0.4% of those aged 65 or over, with 3.3% of the population without health insurance.

=== 2010 census ===
As of the census of 2010, there were 12,030 people, 4,070 households, and 3,497 families residing in the CDP. The population density was 1,323.4 inhabitants per square mile (511.0/km^{2}). There were 4,140 housing units at an average density of 455.4 units per square mile (175.8 units/km^{2}). The racial makeup of the CDP was 78.9% White, 3.9% African American, 0.1% Native American, 12.2% Asian, 0.04% Pacific Islander, 1.7% some other race, and 3.2% from two or more races. Hispanic or Latino of any race were 7.2% of the population.

There were 4,070 households, out of which 38.7% had children under the age of 18 living with them, 77.6% were headed by married couples living together, 5.9% had a female householder with no husband present, and 14.1% were non-families. 10.6% of all households were made up of individuals, and 3.7% were someone living alone who was 65 years of age or older. The average household size was 2.95, and the average family size was 3.16.

In the CDP, the population was spread out, with 24.2% under the age of 18, 7.5% from 18 to 24, 18.3% from 25 to 44, 38.1% from 45 to 64, and 12.0% who were 65 years of age or older. The median age was 45.0 years. For every 100 females, there were 100.6 males. For every 100 females age 18 and over, there were 99.5 males.

For the period 2010 through 2014, the estimated median annual income for a household in the CDP was $163,796, and the median income for a family was $180,091. Male full-time workers had a median income of $125,760 versus $75,119 for females. The per capita income for the CDP was $67,357. About 0.7% of families and 1.8% of the population were below the poverty line, including 1.3% of those under age 18.

== Arts and culture ==
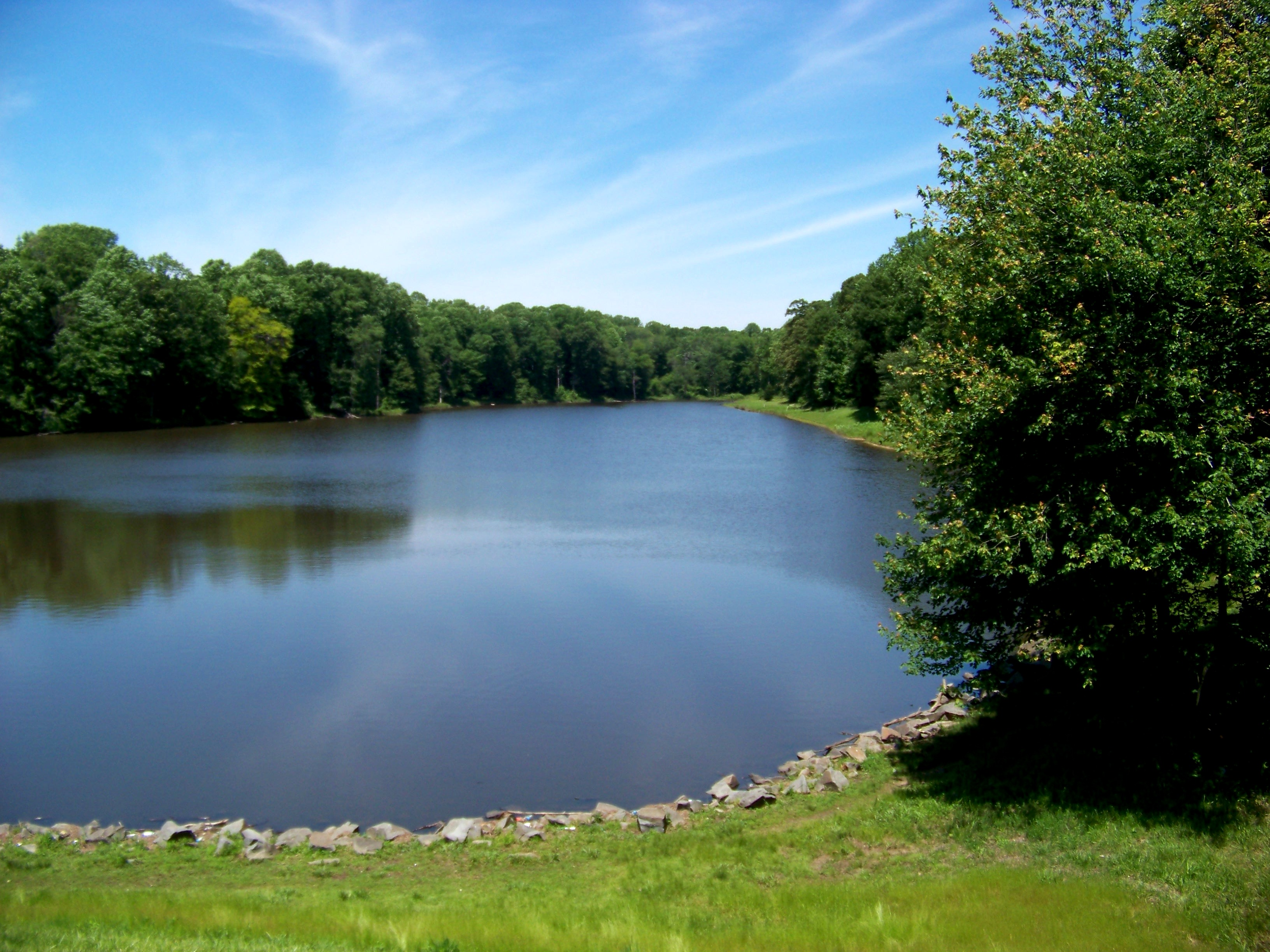
Woodglen Lake is located in the CDP

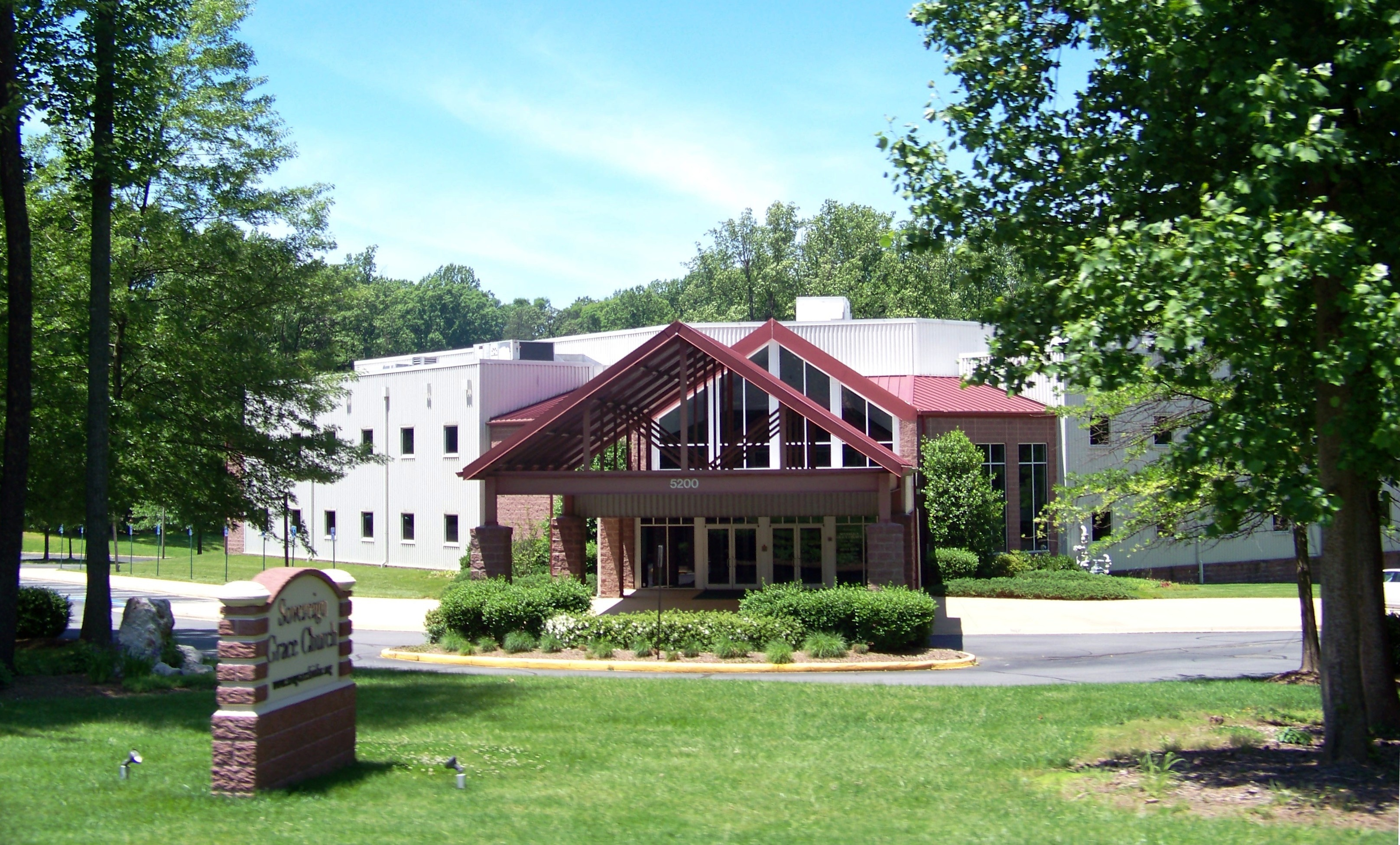
Church in Fairfax Station

Fairfax Station Railroad Museum is located here.

== Education ==
The education system in Fairfax County is among the top public school counties in the country. The children of Fairfax Station go to six elementary schools; William Halley Elementary for the southern part of Fairfax Station and Silverbrook Elementary for the northern part. They can also attend Fairview Elementary, Oak View Elementary, Bonnie Brae Elementary or Sangster Elementary. After 6th grade, the last year in all of the elementary schools, students enter one of four public schools: South County Middle School (feeder school for South County High School), Robinson Secondary School, Robert Frost Middle School (feeder for W.T. Woodson High School), or Lake Braddock Secondary School.

The private school Islamic Saudi Academy previously had its West Campus in Fairfax Station.

== Infrastructure ==
=== Transportation ===
Residents are dependent on private cars for most transportation. Local roads include Route 123 (Ox Road) and Fairfax County Parkway. Some commute using Virginia Railway Express.

== Notable people ==
- Bob Hall, Republican member of the Texas State Senate, former resident of Fairfax Station
- John Jackson, blues singer and guitarist
- Rebiya Kadeer, political activist
- David Lereah, author and businessman
- Doug Limerick, radio personality
- Kjell Lindgren, astronaut
- Bob McEwen, former member of the United States House of Representatives
- Alex Riley, professional wrestler
- William A. Roosma, U.S. Army major general
- Wolfgang W. E. Samuel, author and United States Air Force veteran
- William Lloyd Scott, former United States Senator
- Steve Scully, former senior executive producer and political editor for C-SPAN
- Clarence Thomas, Associate Justice, United States Supreme Court
