= Charles Albright (Pennsylvania politician) =

American politician

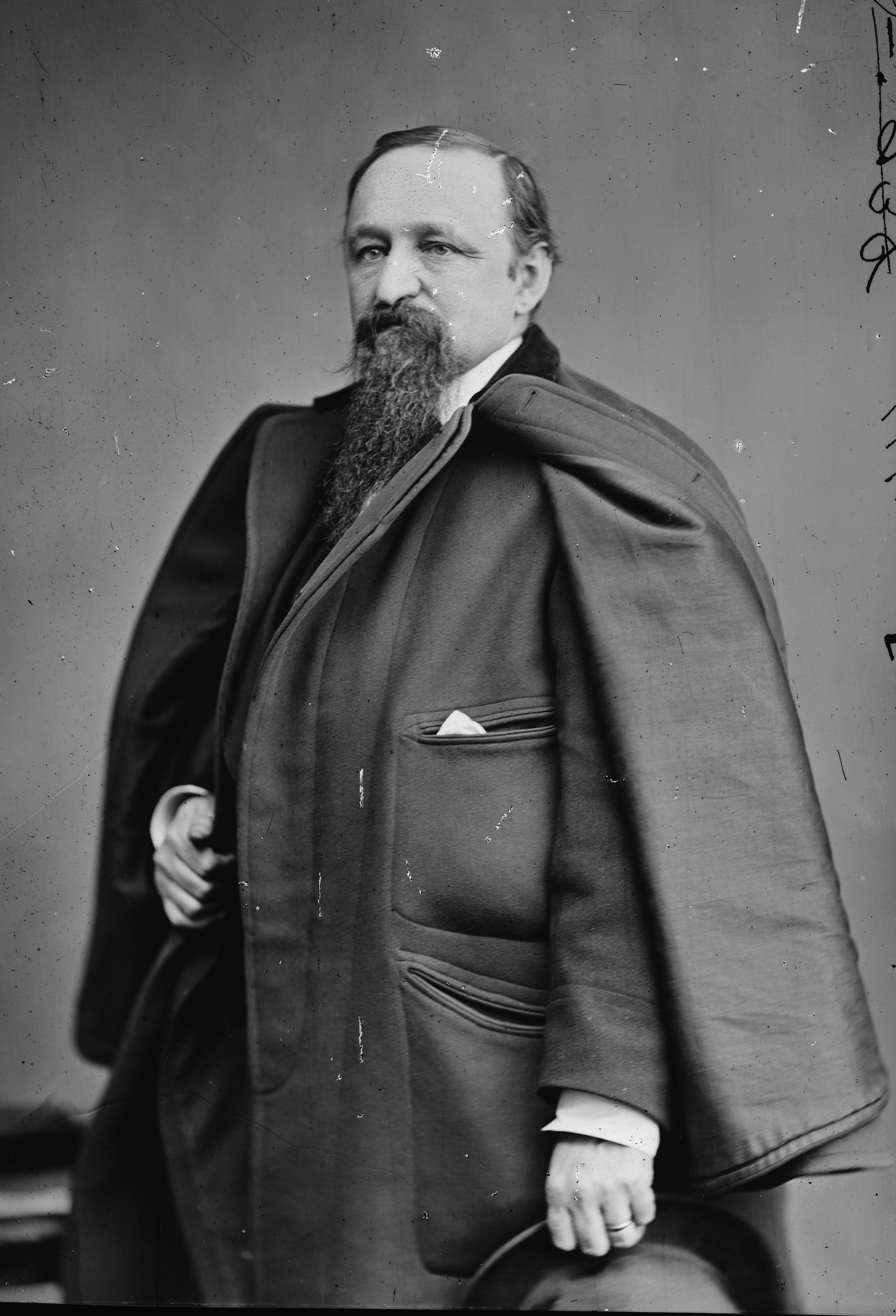
- Albright, c. 1870–1880

Member of the U.S. House of Representatives from Pennsylvania's At-Large district
- In office March 4, 1873 – March 3, 1875
- Preceded by: District created
- Succeeded by: District eliminated

Personal details
- Born: December 13, 1830 Bucks County, Pennsylvania, U.S.
- Died: September 28, 1880 (aged 49) Mauch Chunk, Pennsylvania, U.S.
- Party: Republican
- Education: Dickinson College

Military service
- Allegiance: United States of America
- Branch/service: United States Army; Union Army
- Years of service: 1861–1863; 1864–1865
- Rank: Colonel; Brevet Brigadier General
- Commands: 132nd Pennsylvania Infantry; 34th Pennsylvania Militia Regiment; 202nd Pennsylvania Infantry; Lehigh District
- Battles/wars: American Civil War; Maryland campaign; Battle of South Mountain; Battle of Antietam; Battle of Fredericksburg; Battle of Chancellorsville; Gettysburg campaign

Charles Albright (December 13, 1830 – September 28, 1880) was a Republican member of the U.S. House of Representatives from Pennsylvania.

== Biography ==
Charles Albright was born in Bucks County, Pennsylvania. He attended Dickinson College in Carlisle, Pennsylvania. He studied law, was admitted to the bar in 1852 and commenced practice in Mauch Chunk, Pennsylvania in present-day Jim Thorpe, Pennsylvania. Moving to the Kansas Territory in 1854, Albright participated in its early development; though he returned to Pennsylvania and resumed the practice of law in Mauch Chunk in 1856. He was a delegate to the Republican National Conventions in 1860 and 1872.

During the American Civil War, Albright served in the Union Army as major of the 132nd Pennsylvania Infantry. Honorably mustered out with his regiment and the rank of colonel on May 24, 1863; he was recommissioned as colonel of the Thirty-fourth Pennsylvania Militia during the Gettysburg campaign on July 3, 1863, and honorably mustered out again on August 10, 1863. About a year later, on September 4, 1864; he was recommissioned as colonel of the 202nd Pennsylvania Infantry. On March 7, 1865, President Abraham Lincoln nominated Albright to the honorary grade of brevet brigadier general, U.S. Volunteers, to rank from March 7, 1865 and the U.S. Senate confirmed the award on March 10, 1865. Albright was honorably mustered out August 3, 1865.

After the war, he resumed the practice of law in Mauch Chunk, Pennsylvania. In 1876, several members of the Molly Maguires were tried for the murder of mine boss John P. Jones. Albright served as the prosecution's lead where he reportedly cut an imposing figure in the courtroom wearing his Army dress uniform complete with sword and scabbard.

Albright was elected as a Republican to the Forty-third Congress. He was not a candidate for reelection in 1874. He resumed the practice of law and also engaged in manufacturing in Mauch Chunk until his death there in 1880.

== Notes ==
U.S. House of Representatives
Preceded by District created	Member of the U.S. House of Representatives from Pennsylvania's at-large congressional district March 4, 1873 – March 3, 1875; Served alongside: Lemuel Todd and Glenni W. Scofield	Succeeded by District eliminated
