= 132nd Pennsylvania Infantry Regiment =

Union Army infantry regiment

132nd Pennsylvania Volunteer Infantry
- Active: August 1862 to May 24, 1863
- Country: United States
- Allegiance: Union
- Branch: Infantry
- Engagements: Battle of Antietam; Battle of Fredericksburg; Battle of Chancellorsville

The 132nd Pennsylvania Volunteer Infantry was an infantry regiment that served in the Union Army during the American Civil War.

== Service ==
The 132nd Pennsylvania Infantry was organized at Harrisburg, Pennsylvania, in August 1862 and mustered in under the command of Colonel Richard A. Oakford.

The regiment was attached to 1st Brigade, 3rd Division, II Corps, Army of the Potomac, to November 1862. 2nd Brigade, 3rd Division, II Corps, to May 1863.

The 132nd Pennsylvania Infantry mustered out May 24, 1863.

== Detailed service ==
Moved to Washington, D.C., August 19, and performed duty there until September 2. Ordered to Rockville, Md., September 2. Maryland Campaign September 6–22, 1862. Battle of Antietam, Md., September 16–17. Moved to Harpers Ferry, Va., September 22, and duty there until October 30. Reconnaissance to Leesburg October 1–2. Advanced up Loudon Valley and movement to Falmouth, Va., October 30-November 17. Battle of Fredericksburg December 12–15. Duty at Falmouth until April 27. Chancellorsville Campaign April 27-May 6. Battle of Chancellorsville May 1–5.

== Casualties ==
The regiment lost a total of 113 men during service; 3 officers and 70 enlisted men killed or mortally wounded, 40 enlisted men died of disease.

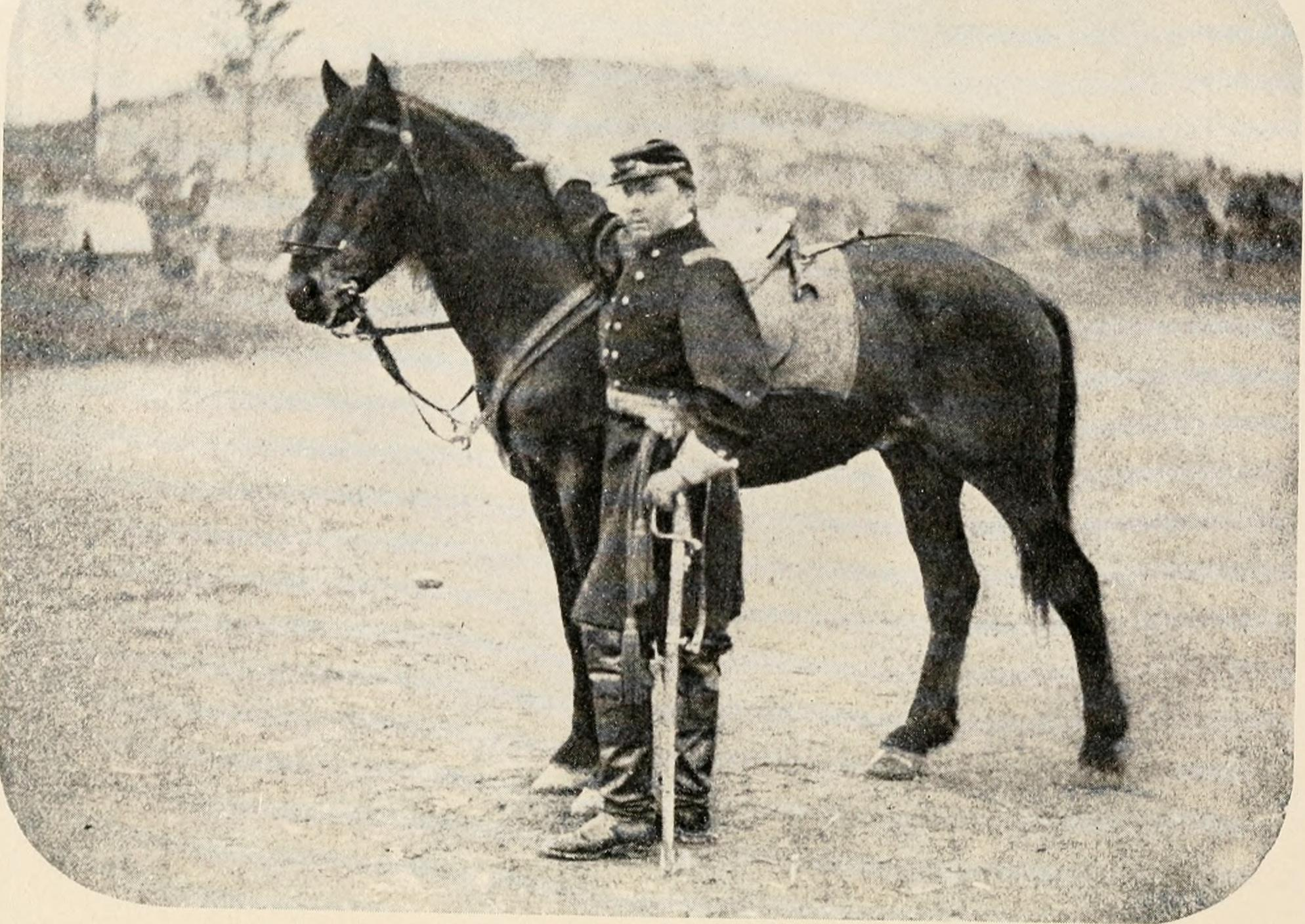
Frederick L. Hitchcock and his Civil War mount, Don Fulano

== Commanders ==
- Colonel Richard A. Oakford- killed in action at the Battle of Antietam
- Colonel Vincent M. Wilcox - discharged January 24, 1863 due to disability
- Colonel Charles Albright
- Lieutenant Frederick Lyman Hitchcock

== See also ==
- List of Pennsylvania Civil War Units
- Pennsylvania in the Civil War
