= Thomas Joy =

English carpenter (1610–1678)

- Born: 6 May 1610; Norfolk, England
- Died: 21 October 1678 (aged 68); Hingham, Massachusetts Bay Colony
- Occupation: Architect
- Spouse: Joan Gallop (m. 1637–1678; his death)
- Buildings: First Town-House, Boston

Thomas Joy (6 May 1610 – 21 October 1678) was an English carpenter known for his work in the American colonies in the 17th century. In conjunction with Bartholomew Bernard, he built Boston's First Town-House, which was completed in 1658. The Old State House stands at the location today.

== Early life ==
Joy was born in 1610 in Norfolk, England. In the mid-1630s, he became the first member of his family to settle in the Thirteen Colonies.

In 1642, he was permitted to "set up an howse over his sellar by the waterside, in the common way by his dwelling in the milfield." The home was on the southeasterly side of Boston's Copp's Hill. His home was one of 46 burned in a fire in 1676.

== Career ==
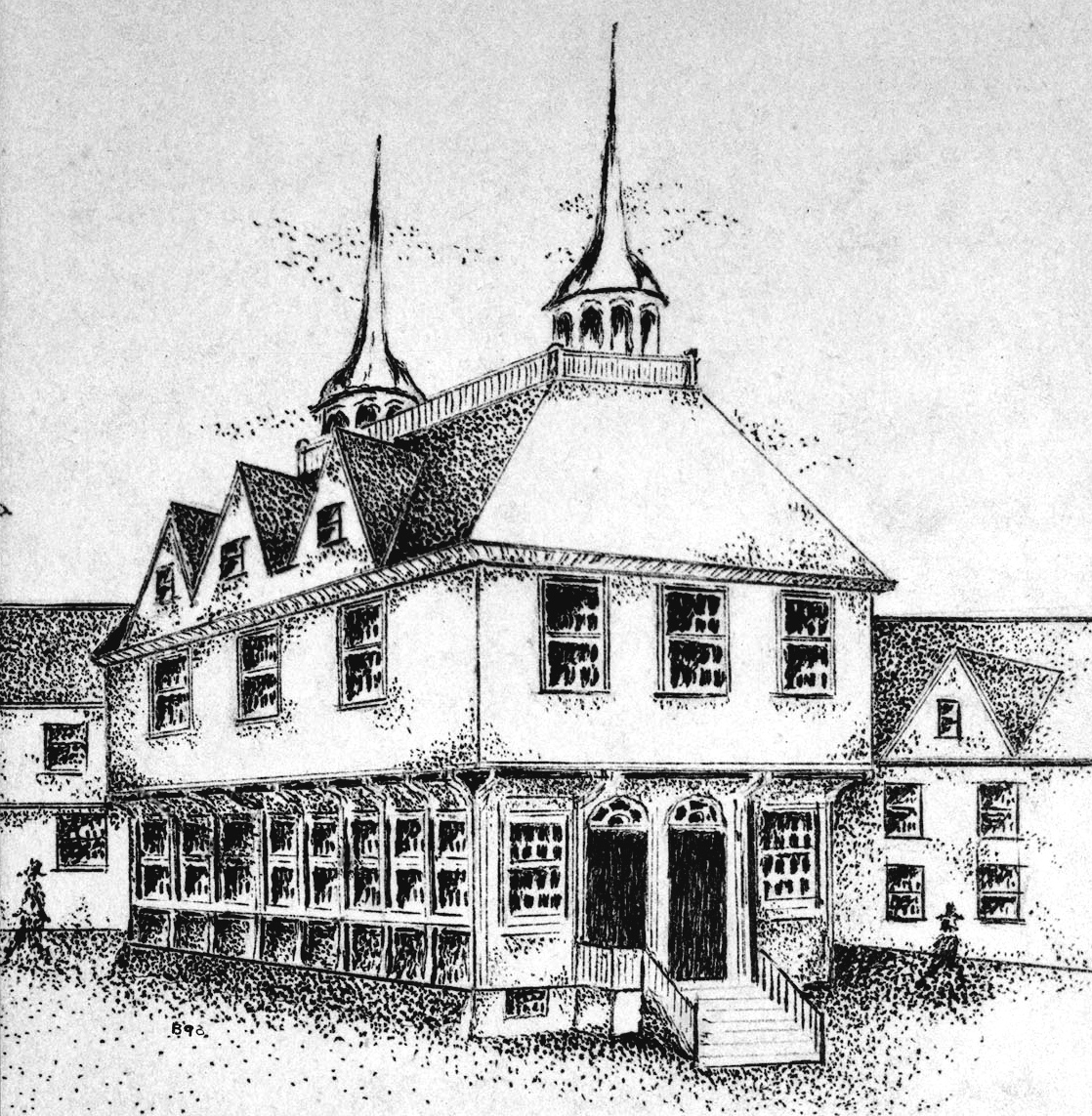
Conjectural drawing of the First Town-House, King Street, Boston

Although he was responsible for the construction of several buildings, Joy's most notable work was the First Town-House in Boston. It was completed in the spring of 1658.

== Personal life ==
Joy married Joan Gallop, a native of Dorset, in 1637. One of their children, son Samuel (1639–1671), pursued a carpenter's trade. Their eight other children were John, Thomas, Joseph, Ephraim, Sarah, Benjamin, Elizabeth and Ruth.

In 1646, he became involved in "Dr Child's Memorial", a protest against certain illiberal policies, including the restriction of right of suffrage afforded to local Puritan churches. The subsequent motion, which was not well supported, was denied by Governor John Winthrop et al. The memorial was so-named because Dr Robert Child was prominent in its support. Joy was put in irons for being "a too ardent lover of liberty."

Joy became a member of the Boston Artillery Company in 1658. They met at the Town-House.

== Death ==
Joy died in 1678, aged 68, in Hingham, Massachusetts Bay Colony, where he had moved thirty years earlier. He was interred in Hingham Cemetery. His widow survived him by thirteen years and was buried beside him.
