= Weymouth Civic District =

Historic district in Massachusetts, United States

- U.S. National Register of Historic Places
- U.S. Historic district
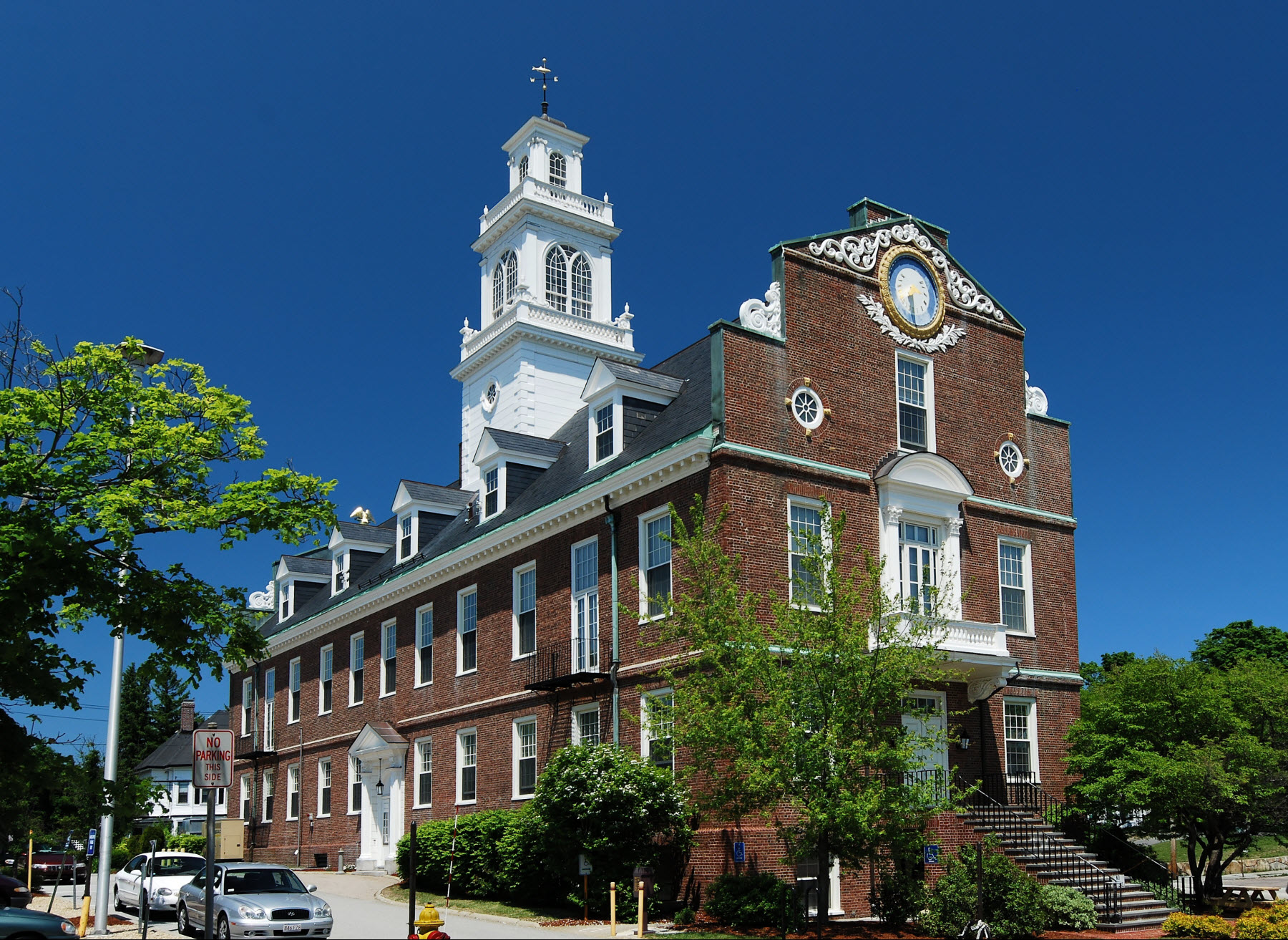
- Town Hall

- Location within Massachusetts Location within the United States
- Location: Weymouth, Massachusetts
- Coordinates: 42°13′15″N 70°56′23″W
- Area: 30 acres (12 ha)
- Architect: McLaughlin & Burr; Prescott, Howard B.
- Architectural style: Colonial Revival, Tudor Revival
- NRHP reference No.: 92000146
- Added to NRHP: March 27, 1992

The Weymouth Civic District is a historic district encompassing the main civic area in Weymouth, Massachusetts. It is anchored by the 1928 Town Hall, which is a slightly reduced-scale replica of the Old State House in Boston, and the Legion Field athletic complex. Most of the houses built in the area along Middle Street between and surrounding these anchors were built between 1850 and 1920. To the south of town hall is a memorial wall, on which are plaques commemorating the town's military. The oldest building in the district is the 1926 Tudor Revival Weymouth Industrial School building, located next to the middle school.

The district was added to the National Register of Historic Places in 1992.

== See also ==
- National Register of Historic Places listings in Norfolk County, Massachusetts
