= Old State House (Boston) =

Building in Boston, Massachusetts

- U.S. National Register of Historic Places
- U.S. National Historic Landmark
- U.S. Historic district – Contributing property
- Boston Landmark
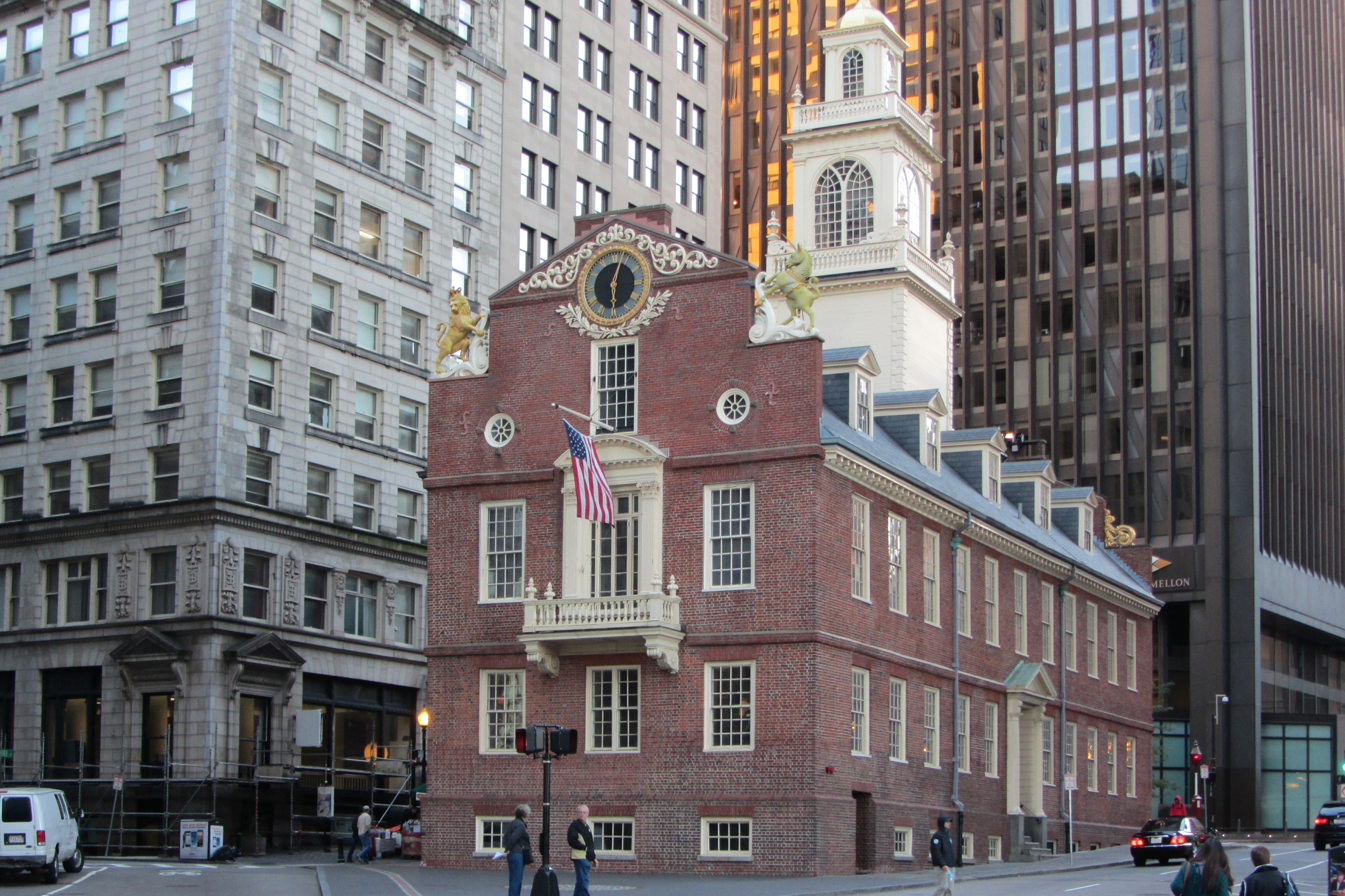
- Looking southwest in 2013

- Location within Boston Location within Massachusetts Location within the United States
- Interactive map of Old State House
- Location: 206 Washington Street; Boston, Massachusetts, U.S.
- Coordinates: 42°21′32″N 71°03′27″W
- Area: 28,000 sq ft (2,600 m^{2})
- Built: 1713 (313 years ago)
- Architects: Repairs and alterations: Thomas Dawes (c. 1772); Alterations: Isaiah Rogers (1830); Restoration: George Albert Clough (1881–1882); Renovation: Joseph Everett Chandler (1909–1910); Renovation: Goody, Clancy and Associates (1991)
- Architectural style: Georgian
- Part of: Boston National Historical Park (ID74002222)
- NRHP reference No.: 66000779

Significant dates
- Added to NRHP: October 15, 1966
- Designated NHL: October 9, 1960
- Designated CP: October 26, 1974
- Designated BOSL: October 11, 1994

The Old State House (originally the Second Town-House; also the Court House, Province House, or Old Provincial State House) is a historic building at 206 Washington Street in Boston, Massachusetts, United States. Completed in 1713, it is the city's oldest extant public building, hosting the judicial, legislative, and executive branches of the Massachusetts provincial and state governments during the 18th century. At 65 feet (20 meters), it was also the tallest building in Boston until 1745. The Old State House is located on Boston's Freedom Trail and is designated as a National Historic Landmark and Boston Landmark.

Two buildings previously occupied the site: the First Town-House, which burned down in 1711, followed by the Second Town-House, which was rebuilt after being gutted by fire in 1747. The state legislature, the Massachusetts General Court, moved to the New State House in 1798, after which the Old State House was used by the municipal government. It was used as Boston's city hall after Isaiah Rogers refurbished the structure in 1830. After a new city hall opened in 1841, the structure was used by commercial tenants for four decades. George A. Clough renovated the Old State House in 1881–1882, following threats of demolition, and the Bostonian Society took over much of the building. The Old State House has functioned as a history museum since then, undergoing additional renovations in the 20th and 21st centuries.

The building has a brick facade and rises 2 1/2 stories above a partially raised basement. The facade is divided vertically into bays, with entrances on three sides and a balcony facing east. It has a gable roof with decorations such as a lion and unicorn, topped by a central tower. The interior has been modified repeatedly; the modern layout dates to Clough's renovation, with design details from various eras. The rooms are arranged around a spiral stair that passes through a rotunda. The basement has mechanical spaces and an entrance to the MBTA subway's State station, while the first and second stories have exhibit rooms flanking the rotunda. The building also has an attic and additional rooms in the tower. The museum hosts Boston-related exhibits and reenactments.

== Site ==
The Old State House is located at 206 Washington Street in Boston, Massachusetts, United States. It is bounded by Washington Street to the west; State Street to the north; and the intersection of State, Devonshire, and Congress streets to the east. A pedestrian street abuts the building to the south. The site slopes down to the east, where the basement has an entrance to the State station of the MBTA subway. Nearby buildings include One Boston Place to the west, the Ames Building and 28 State Street to the north, the Second Brazer Building to the southeast, and the Merchants Exchange building to the east (across Congress Street). The Old Corner Bookstore is also nearby to the south.

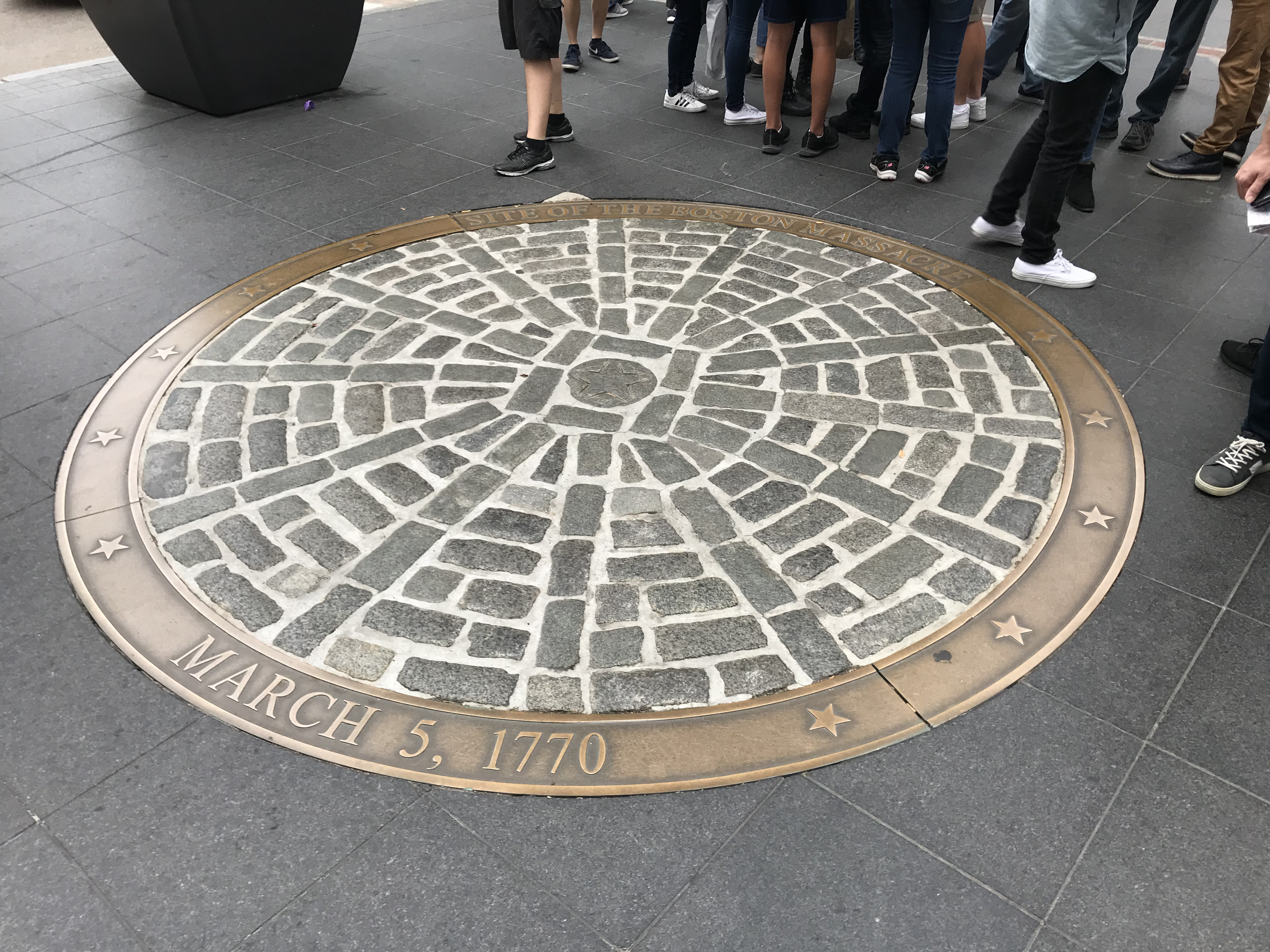
Marker just outside the building commemorating the Boston Massacre, which occurred nearby

Just east of the building is a cobblestone memorial marker for the 1770 Boston Massacre, which took place nearby. Dating from c. 1886, the marker formerly occupied a traffic island at State and Devonshire streets. The marker was moved in the early 2010s, when the State station was renovated. The modern marker is surrounded by a brass ring with stars. The Old State House and the Boston Massacre site are consecutive stops on the Freedom Trail, a path connecting historic sites in Boston. Sequentially, they are between the Old South Meeting House and Faneuil Hall.

The site has been used by the public since 1634, when a public market was built there. Washington Street was the only link to Boston's Shawmut Peninsula before the peninsula was expanded via land reclamation. State Street, then known as King Street, ran east to Long Wharf. The wooden First Town-House, developed by Thomas Joy, was built on the Old State House's site in 1658 and burned in the fire of 1711.

== History ==
The modern Old State House, built on the site of the First Town-House, is Boston's oldest extant public building. Over the years, the Old State House has been known by multiple alternate names, including the Second Town-House, (Note: Sometimes the "Town House in Boston"; also shortened to the "Town House") Province House, Court House, (Note: Sometimes, more specifically as the "Province Court House" or the "Court House in Boston") Old Provincial State House, or City Hall and variants thereof. Although the current structure's exterior dates from 1713, both the interior and exterior have been modified several times over the years.

=== Seat of colony government ===
==== First building: 1712–1747 ====
After the First Town-House burned down, the governments of the town of Boston, Suffolk County, and Massachusetts Bay Province lacked a meeting place. Town and provincial officials quickly agreed to erect a new building on the same site, and a committee was established in 1712 to construct a building of up to 36 feet (11 m) wide and 110 to 112 feet (34 to 34 m) long. The project was budgeted at 5,000 Massachusetts pounds. Based on the anticipated interior usage, the province paid half the cost, while the town and county paid one-fourth each. Samuel Sewall laid the cornerstone of the new building that May. William Payne built the Second Town-House; the designer is not known, but Robert Twelves is sometimes credited. Thomas Dawes has also been cited as the architect, but his contributions date from 1772. The Massachusetts General Court, the provincial legislature, had moved into the building by April 1713, when its first session took place there.

The layout differed in several respects from the First Town-House. The basement was at least partially rented out, and the town government collected the rental income. The building's first floor housed a merchants' exchange, a feature derived from old English town halls; this space was enclosed, in contrast to the First Town-House's open-air market. The first floor also had records rooms for the county and province, and it had a post office at one point, along with two staircases ascending to the second floor. Stair lobbies separate that floor into three primary spaces, housing each of the province's three branches of government. From west to east, these were the Suffolk County and Massachusetts Supreme Judicial Court courtrooms; the General Court legislative chamber; and the Council Chamber of the Royal Governor. The central chamber was also used by the Boston Board of Selectmen, which governed the town. On the third floor were committee rooms for the selectmen. It is unknown how the attic was used.

There are no extant images of the full exterior as it originally appeared, though parts of the structure are shown in engravings of Boston overall. The original design likely appeared similar to the modern building, with oxeye windows, stepped gables, and a balcony. There was an octagonal tower with a bird-shaped weathervane. A 1743 view showed steps ascending to double doors on the eastern elevation of the facade, and there was also a sundial. Lion and unicorn motifs, representing the British, were installed between 1743 and 1751. At 65 feet (20 meters), the Second Town-House was the tallest building in Boston until 1745, when it was surpassed by the Old North Church in the North End.

The Second Town-House was used for government business, announcements, and ceremonies, including welcoming parties for new provincial governors. Politicians hosted commemorations and parties in the council room; announcements were made from the balcony; and (in at least one case) forgers were publicly humiliated on the steps below. The town's selectmen moved their meetings to the new Faneuil Hall in 1742. Colonists sometimes convened to protest provincial government actions, requiring frequent window repairs. A riot took place there in November 1747 after British leaders tried to "impress" colonists into serving in the British military.

==== 1747 fire and reconstruction ====
The Second Town-House was gutted by fire on December 9, 1747, after sparks from a first-floor hearth spread rapidly. The blaze destroyed all goods and records inside; the exterior brick walls survived the fire, and the window openings were quickly boarded up. Provincial meetings were temporarily relocated to Faneuil Hall. The provincial government considered relocating to another Massachusetts town or to present-day Maine, but had decided by March 1748 to rebuild on the same site. The modifications were budgeted at about 3,705 Massachusetts pounds, of which the province was to pay half, and the county and town would pay the rest. The town government, having moved most business to Faneuil Hall, unsuccessfully asked the General Court to waive the town's share of the costs. The modifications were completed within a year of the fire. The first exterior views specifically focusing on the building date from shortly afterward, in 1751.

The interior was rebuilt likely according to the original plan, although specific drawings of the layout have not emerged. Details of the first-floor space are scarce, but the Ancient and Honorable Artillery Company of Massachusetts sometimes used it for drills. Though Captain Francis Goelet wrote in 1750 that the first floor was open to the elements, later historians wrote that he may have been talking about Faneuil Hall. Two staircases ascended to lobbies between three second-floor rooms—from west to east, the Court, Representatives' and Council chambers. (Note: The chambers were as follows: West – the Court Chamber, measuring 32 by 22 feet (9.8 by 6.7 m) across; Center – the Representatives' Chamber, measuring 32 by 38 feet (9.8 by 11.6 m) across; East – the Council Chamber, measuring 32 by 32 feet (9.8 by 9.8 m) across; The Council Chamber had the most elaborate decorations of the three. The Representatives' Chamber had a speaker's pedestal, benches, and a codfish on the ceiling. A 1977 study failed to find any extant literature detailing the post-1748 Court Chamber.) The third floor housed committee rooms and offices, while the basement was rented out. The exterior was altered: The gambrel roof was replaced by a gable roof, the octagonal tower was replaced by a tiered square tower, and the parapet on the eastern end was adorned with lion and unicorn figures. Beneath the eastern parapet, new laws were announced from a small balcony. For nearly a century afterward, significant modifications were mostly confined to the interior; the roof design persisted until 1870.

==== Rebuilt structure: 1750–1776 ====
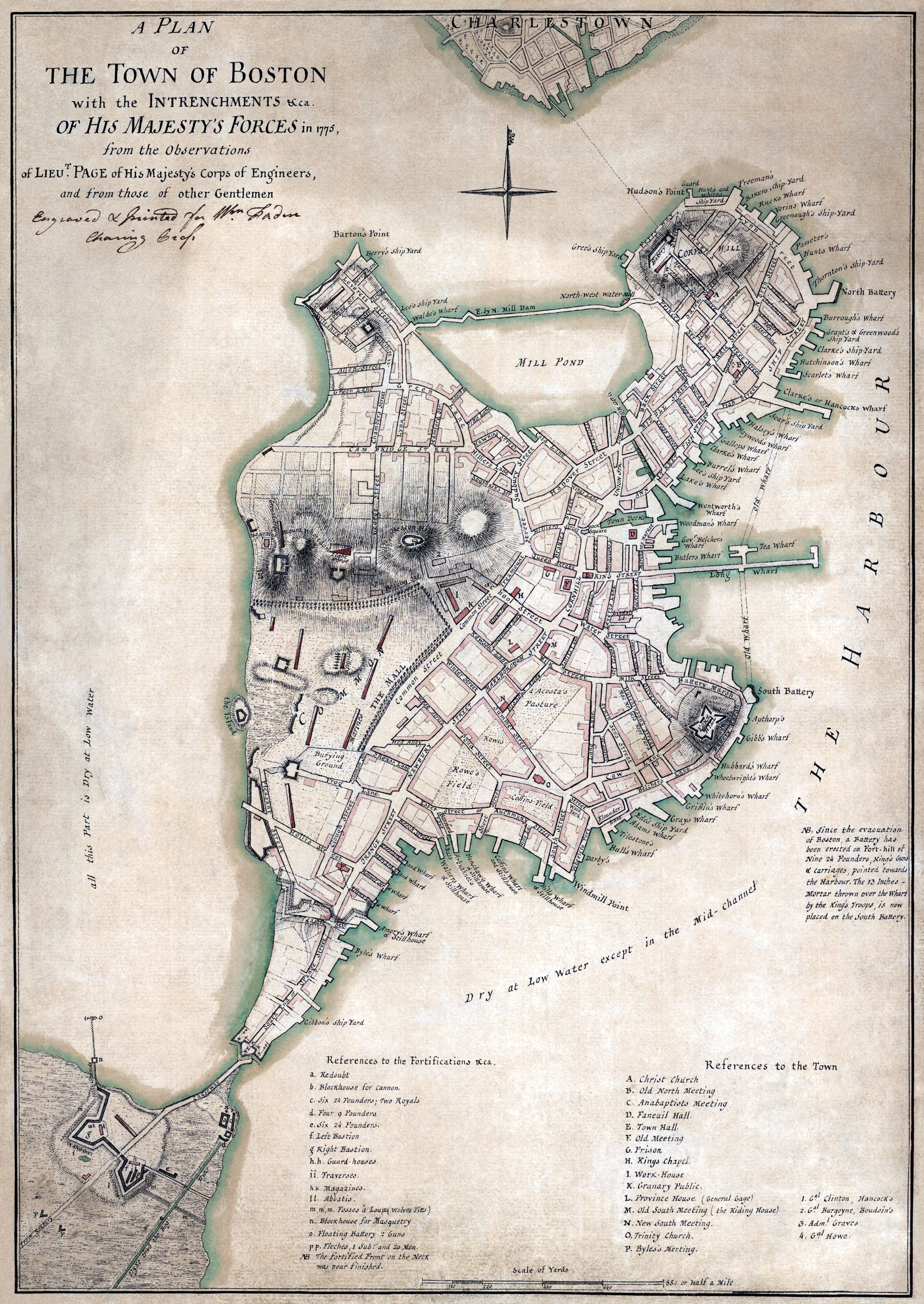
On this map of 1775, today's Old State House (then the Second Town-House) is marked as "E – Town Hall" at the intersection of Cornhill and King Street.

For the most part, the 1750s at the Town House were uneventful. During this time, the building featured portraits of British royals and notable Bostonians, along with maps. The Cape Ann earthquake of 1755 did not damage the building, but a later study found that it was structurally vulnerable to north–south transverse forces. The third-floor space had been subdivided no later than 1756, when its western end was designated as the General Court's committee room. When Faneuil Hall burned down in 1761, the town government temporarily returned to the Town House. Judicial activities were moved to a new courthouse in 1767 or 1769.

By the mid-1760s, there was growing pro-independence sentiment. This created friction between the legislative and executive branches, both of which met on the second floor. A visitor gallery was added on the western side of the Representatives' Chamber in 1766 or 1767. The gallery was built by Thomas Crafts at the behest of Massachusetts House of Representatives clerk Samuel Adams. This may have been the first public gallery in a legislative room in the United States.

In response to protests over taxes, the British government sent troops to Boston in September 1768 and pointed weaponry at the Town House's front door, prompting the General Court to move to Faneuil Hall. The legislature, refusing to convene at the Town House while British troops were present, temporarily moved to Cambridge in 1769. The British used the building as a military barracks during that time, moving into the first floor. The balcony was likely fixed by mid-1770. Once the troops had left in late 1772, the General Court moved back to the building. Renovations took place the next year. These modifications involved the "taking down the East End and rebuilding", along with repainting the exterior. The first use of the name "State House" dates from this time.

===== Notable colonial-era events =====
In November 1755, Spencer Phips, Lieutenant Governor of the Province of Massachusetts Bay, signed a bounty hunting proclamation calling on settlers to hunt and murder the native Penobscot. Phips's proclamation inspired a 2021 documentary, where descendants of the Penobscot read the proclamation aloud at the building. Pro-independence activities were organized at the Town House, and one source wrote that the building hosted "some of the most stirring events preceding the Revolutionary War". In 1761, James Otis argued against the Writs of Assistance before the judges in the Council Chamber; he lost the case, but influenced public opinion in favor of the American Revolution. John Adams later wrote of that speech, "Then and there ... the child independence was born." Legislation such as the Stamp Act was also announced at the Second Town-House.

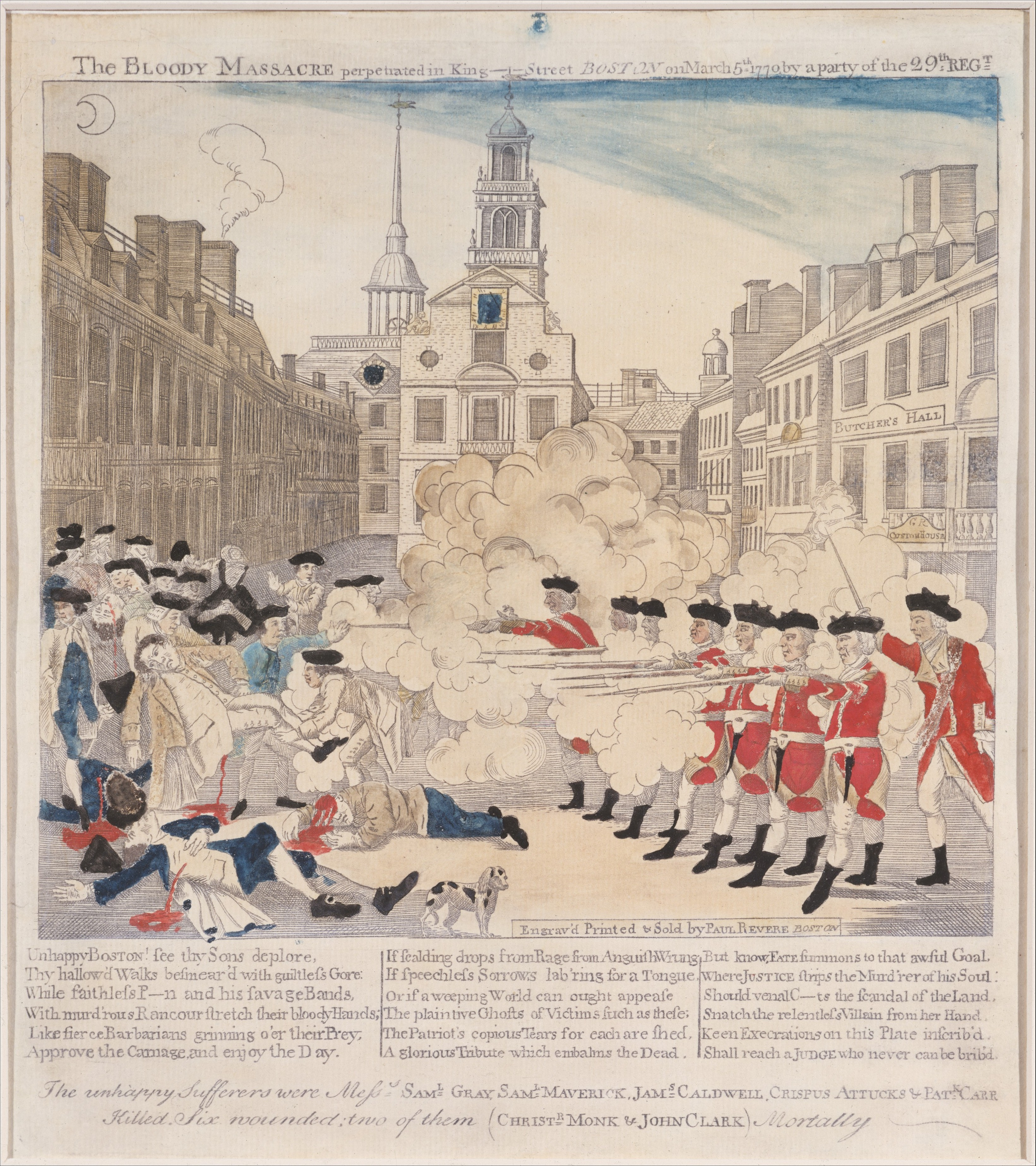
This engraving by Paul Revere, portraying the Boston Massacre, shows the Old State House sitting prominently behind the action.

When the Boston Massacre took place on March 5, 1770, Lieutenant Governor Thomas Hutchinson stood on the building's balcony, ordering colonists to return to their homes. The building also hosted court proceedings, including the 1769 trial of the four men who hijacked the frigate Rose, as well as the trial of the officers involved in the Boston Massacre the next year. Massachusetts's last colonial governor, Thomas Gage, took office at the Second Town-House in 1774, after which declining relations with Britain led to the Revolutionary War.

=== Seat of state government: 1776–1798 ===
On July 18, 1776, two weeks after the United States declared independence, the Declaration of Independence was read from the balcony to jubilant crowds, (Note: One source from 1882 stated that the decorations were burned on July 25, 1776, citing a newspaper issue from that date. A date of July 23 has also been cited.) who tore down and burned the lion and unicorn atop the building. These features were replaced by scrolls, which are similar to the ones at the western end. That October, the state government bought the Court Chamber from the county to make space for the House of Representatives, whose membership had grown following U.S. independence. The stair lobby separating the Court and Representatives' chambers was removed to create an expanded Representatives' Chamber, and the stair itself was relocated. The Massachusetts Senate occupied the Council Chamber, (Note: The Representatives' Chamber measured 57.5 by 32 feet (17.5 by 9.8 m) after the American Revolution–era modification. The Senate Chamber measured 32 by 32 feet (9.8 by 9.8 m) across, remaining unchanged in layout and size.) while the first floor continued to be used by merchants. State legislators first convened at the building on November 7, 1776, and the former Town House became the Massachusetts State House. The Governor's Council and the Governor's, Secretary's, and Treasurer's offices were relocated to the Province House.

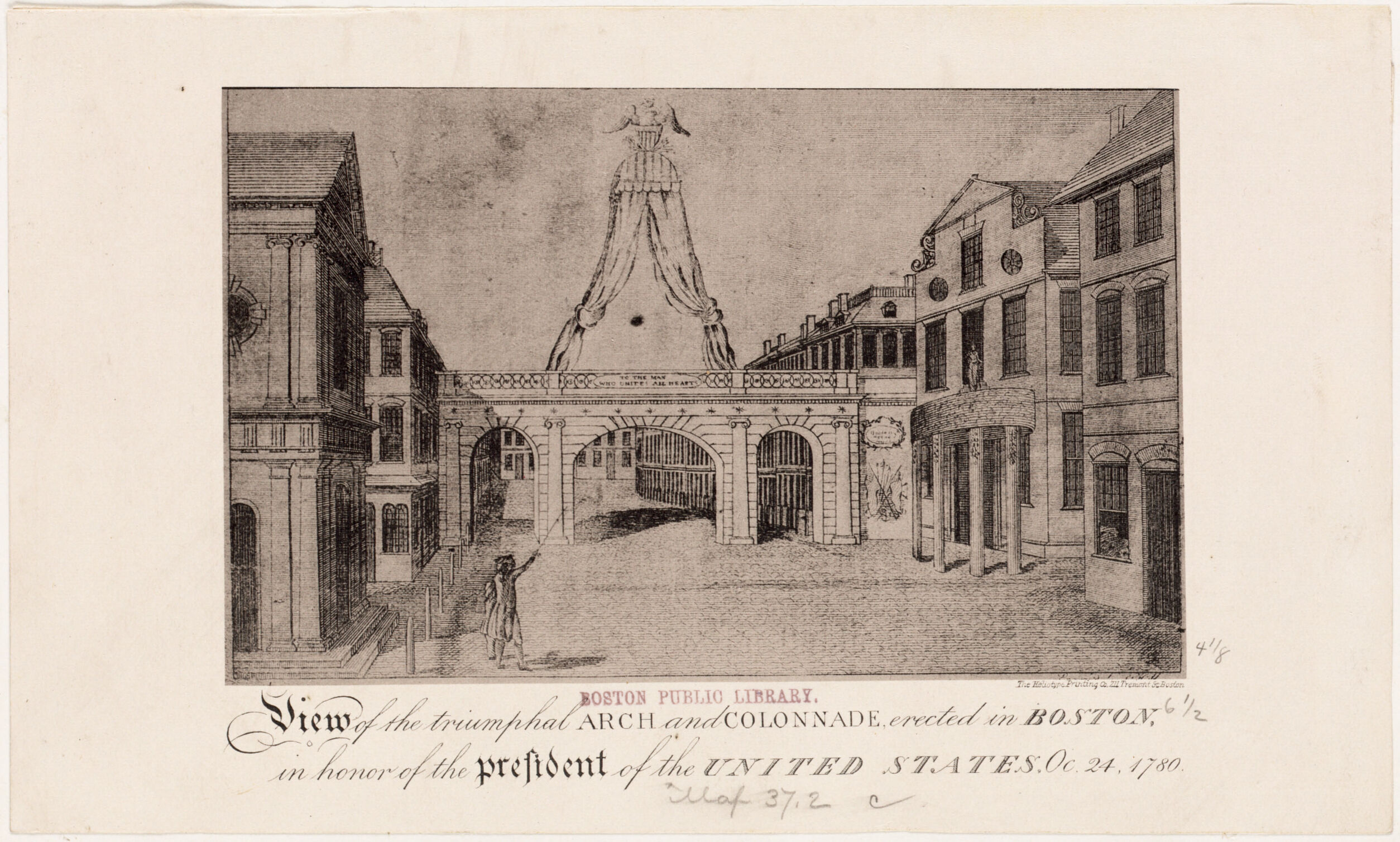
Triumphal arch, built in 1789 in preparation for Washington's visit to the city

Massachusetts's first state governor, John Hancock, was inaugurated at the State House in 1780, as were all governors succeeding him for 18 years. The Constitution of Massachusetts was adopted there that year. The building also hosted services for the Old South Church's congregation in 1781–1782, along with events such as a 1782 reception for French troops and the 1788 Constitutional Convention of Massachusetts. A temporary triumphal arch designed by Charles Bulfinch was built west of the building, celebrating newly-elected President George Washington's visit to the town in 1789. During that visit, Washington observed a procession in his honor from the building's balcony; the arch was demolished shortly thereafter, no later than 1793.

Modifications to the building itself included changes to the windows in 1782 and the establishment of a treasurer's office below the Council Chamber in 1787, where that office remained for five years. More work was done in 1788–1789, including the installation of stone steps, an iron balustrade, and replacement windows. By then, the second-floor legislative chambers were overcrowded. The first floor hosted the Court of Common Pleas and the Supreme Judicial Court's clerks, and it sheltered merchants during inclement weather. The state government approved a plan in 1793, which would give the existing State House to the town if a new State House were built. Bulfinch designed the new Massachusetts State House, to which the legislature was relocated on January 11, 1798. By that year, the Old State House was used as a departure point for horse-drawn carriages to outlying towns, a use that continued until 1809.

=== Boston government building ===
==== Business use: 1803–1829 ====
For several years after the new State House opened, there was disagreement as to how the Old State House should be used; a late-19th-century source wrote that the building was left abandoned and was targeted by troublemakers. The town of Boston bought the county's and state's ownership stakes in 1803, paying $6,000 for the property. (Note: Equivalent to $156,000 in 2025) (Note: One 1956 source writes that the $6,000 figure represents only the amount paid by Boston to the state government. The Suffolk County government received $1,923 (equivalent to $50,000 in 2025). The Norfolk County government, which had succeeded from Suffolk, received $1,176 (equivalent to $31,000 in 2025).) The selectmen opted not to sell the building, saying that any potential tenant would worsen congestion nearby because the streets were too narrow. Instead, the town government sought to lease the building under terms that prevented alterations without the selectmen's approval; later sources described the lease terms as "an early form of preservation restriction". Possibly around this time, the first floor underwent several changes, including removal of doorways and steps. Charles Bulfinch's wife wrote in 1804 that the structure had been turned into stores, which sold a wide variety of merchandise "to draw attention of the young and gay".

Initially, the basement was used as a wine cellar, and the second floor housed the Boston Board of Health and a fencing school. The first floor had shops and was, at least in 1800, also occupied by Supreme Judicial Court clerks. There were two lawyers and eight merchants in the Old State House by 1805, and there were nineteen total tenants by 1810. Among them were William Barry, a hatmaker who moved into the building in 1807. A c. 1815 engraving by Abel Bowen of the building's western end shows two first-floor windows, flanked by two doors. A clock was added sometime between 1817 and 1825, and windows in the basement and a doorway on the north elevation were also added around that time.

Between 1820 and 1829, the Grand Lodge of Massachusetts occupied the third floor and the eastern portion of the second floor. The portion of the second floor occupied by the Grand Lodge was decorated elaborately, while Boston's treasurer used a room at the western end of that floor. A proposal to replace the building with a bank branch was put forth in 1822, and the city government painted the facade white in 1825. There was another proposal to destroy the building the next year, the Washington Monument Association suggested replacing it with a monument to George Washington, saying the Old State House was a hindrance to traffic. This was not carried out, and neither was an 1828 proposal to cover the brickwork with imitation stone. The Old State House was used by offices and businesses until 1830. (Note: One source says that commercial use ceased in 1829. Barry was given an eviction notice that year but did not move out until 1830.) Retrospectively, one commentator described the building as having undergone "dreadful degradation" during the early 19th century.

==== City Hall: 1830–1841 ====
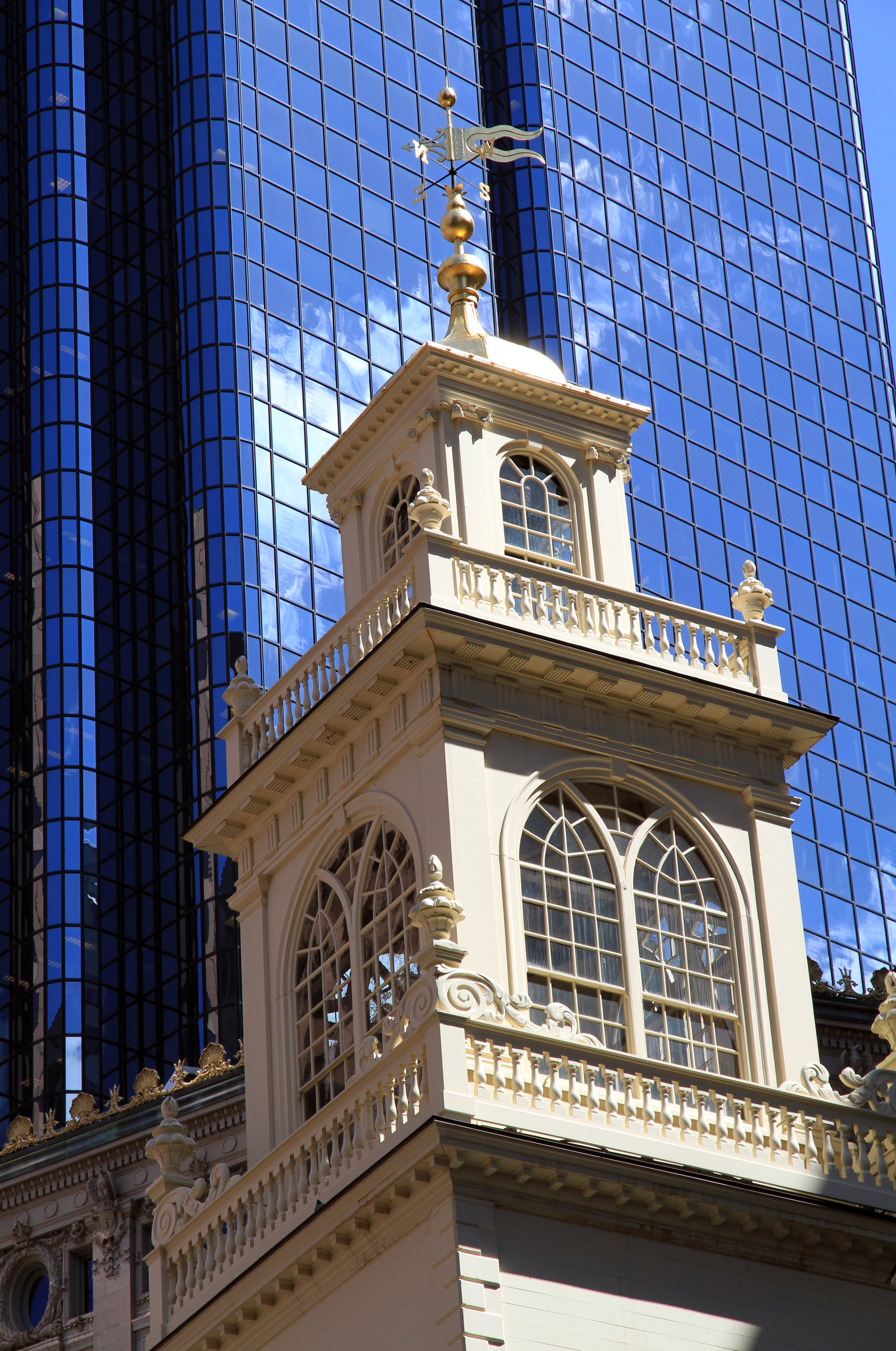
The tower, which is centered along the roofline, replaced a cupola lost in the 1747 fire.

The newly-established Boston city government began looking to relocate the city's post office and newsroom to the Old State House in 1829, and the Boston City Council leased the first floor and one upper-story room for that purpose in April 1830. City officials decided to use the building as a city hall the same year, while work for the newsroom and post office was already ongoing. Barry moved out in May, and two months later, the city's Common Council ordered that the building be restored to a good condition. Isaiah Rogers, collaborating with his assistant William Washburn, altered the building's interior in a Greek Revival or a generic classical revival style. The post office opened on September 11, 1830, and the building was rededicated six days later on September 17. The renovation's $25,000 cost (Note: Equivalent to $846,000 in 2025) and the architectural style were not well received by the public.

Aside from an 1882 drawing labeled as a "facsimile" of Rogers's plan, no other drawings of Rogers's redesign have been identified. On the western and eastern elevations, he installed classical porticoes made of wood. The northern and southern elevations received new steps leading to the doorways, and the eastern elevation's sundial was replaced with a clock. Abel Bowen's 1838 Picture of Boston describes City Hall's interior. The first floor had a post office, a merchants' exchange interrupted by columns, and a newsroom from west to east. Several floor girders were partially removed to make way for a spiral staircase between the first and second floors, which ascended the eastern side of a rotunda, leaving open space to the west. On the second floor were the Hall of Common Council to the west and the mayor's and aldermen's offices to the east. Other city offices occupied small rooms around the second-floor stair landing and on the third floor, and there was also a vaccination hall on the third floor. These spaces were illuminated by gas lamps throughout.

Another fire occurred in 1832; one newspaper from 1882 noted that the building "narrowly escaped utter destruction", but a 1970 report noted that the damage was minor. During the building's time as City Hall, its basement continued to be rented out, and the city also collected rent from the newsroom and post office. On October 21, 1835, Mayor Theodore Lyman Jr. gave temporary refuge to William Lloyd Garrison, the editor of the abolitionist paper The Liberator, who was being chased by a violent mob. Garrison was kept safe in the Old State House and was later driven to the Leverett Street Jail, where he was charged with inciting a riot. The city government moved out during March 1841, relocating to the County Courthouse on School Street. The post office and newsroom stayed on the first floor. Though the city retained ownership of the building, it was not designated specifically for public use, as Faneuil Hall and Boston Common were.

=== Commercial use: 1841–1880 ===
After City Hall's relocation, the space was again rented out to commercial tenants, including a telegraph office, lawyers, and architects. The exterior fell into disrepair, and signage and windows were added to the facade without regard to esthetics. The central staircase was also removed and the interiors rearranged. The clothiers Brown, Lawrence & Stickney, which occupied the building's eastern section, modified the basement openings there. By the late 1840s, the eastern elevation had advertising signage for Brown, Lawrence & Stickney. Charles A. Smith modified the first floor in 1844, and his tailor shop filled the first-floor space west of the rotunda for three decades. Both Smith and Brown, Lawrence & Stickney ran advertisements depicting the building; one of Smith's advertisements, from 1850, is among the earliest known depictions of the interior.

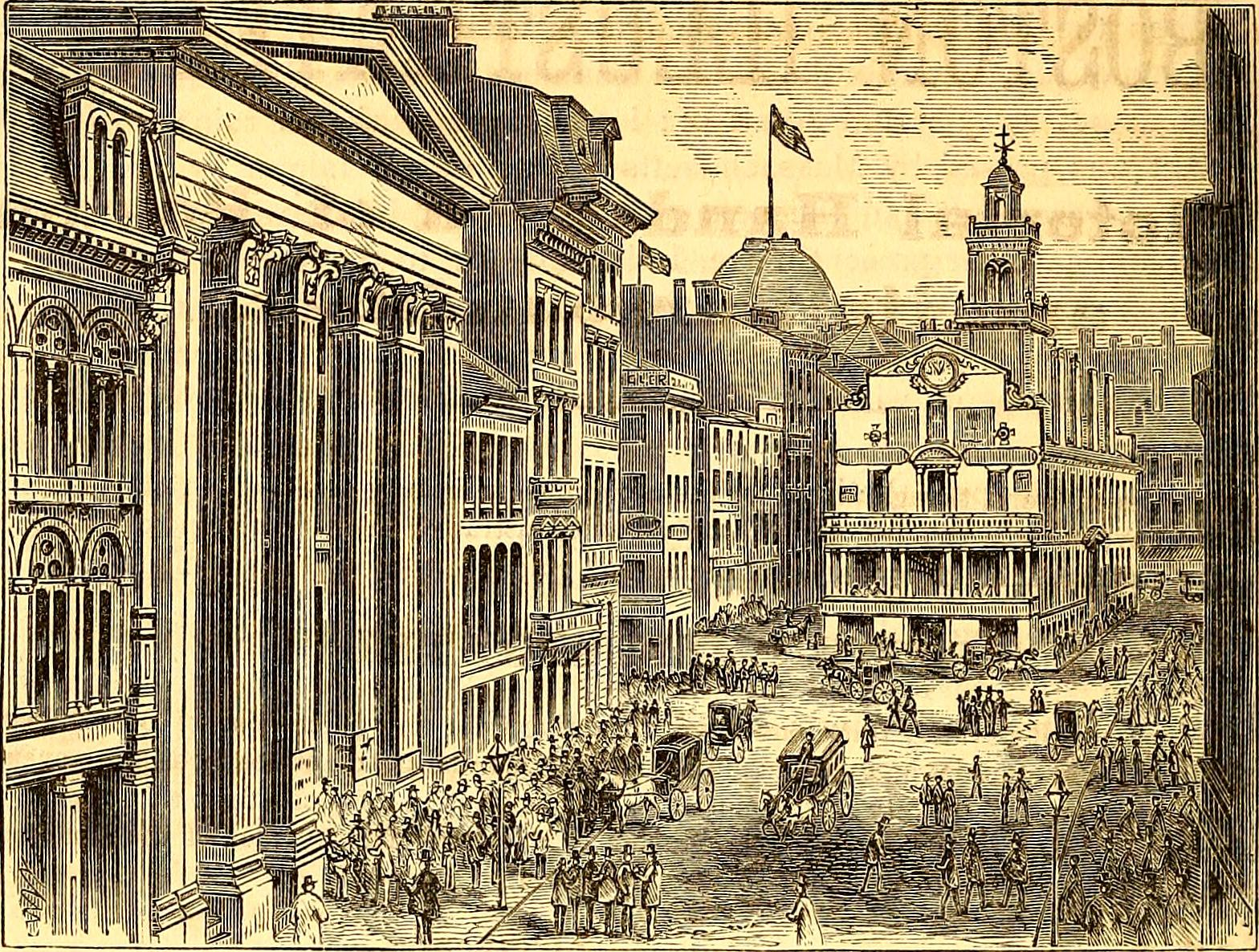
An 1865 sketch of the Old State House (right), depicting the building with a portico

Depictions from c. 1850 show that new storefronts and entrances had been added to both the western and eastern elevations. Mechanical work and repairs also took place in the early 1850s, and doors to the basement were likely installed on the northern elevation. The building recorded 29 tenants by 1855 (although some room numbers may have had multiple tenants), and further repairs took place later that decade. The earliest known photograph of the State House, from c. 1860, depicts some signage on the facade and two skylights in the roof. Comparisons of illustrations from the 1860s show that additional signs may have been installed during that decade, along with stairs on State Street and semaphore lamps on the eastern elevation. A group of three tenants signed a ten-year lease for the building in 1866, after which the Old State House's exterior condition declined further, with peeling paint and missing architectural details.

The structure had 50 simultaneous occupants by 1870. A mansard roof was installed during that decade, (Note: One source dates the mansard roof's construction more precisely to 1876.) and windows were replaced as well. In the mid-1870s, the government of Chicago proposed relocating the Old State House to Chicago's Lake Michigan shoreline, possibly for a world's fair. After the lease expired in 1876, Boston's Joint Standing Committee on Streets proposed demolishing the building to make way for street widening, but the City Council specifically voted against demolition that April, instead ordering the removal of the eastern portico. The council also leased the building for five more years. City registrar (and later) alderman William Henry Whitmore unsuccessfully sought to relocate his department's offices to the Old State House. By August 1876, The American Architect wrote that the portico had been removed. Contemporary images show that, by 1880, there was a recessed doorway where the portico once stood; the former balcony on that elevation was replaced with a window. The tower was also repaired, but the rest of the building was left untouched, amid continued debate over its future.

The City Council was again discussing the building's disposition by 1880. By then, there were calls to demolish the building to make way for office development or to speed up traffic. Advocates of demolition claimed that the building had lost its original design details and was seeing declining profits, and one such advocate proposed constructing a monument to commemorate the site's history. Although the building's facade was hidden by advertising billboards, much of the exterior walls, along with the tower above it, remained untouched. Whitmore advocated for the building's protection, saying that the original structure was still essentially intact. The City Council described the building as "disfigured" and "defaced", while historians retrospectively described the decades of commercial tenancy as "adaptive abuse". The council considered a proposal in May 1881 to spend $35,000 (Note: Equivalent to $1,003,000 in 2025) renovating the building for governmental use. The council also considered again leasing the building to businesses, which would have generated an estimated $762,380 (Note: Equivalent to $21,852,000 in 2025) over twenty years. Ultimately, the lease expired on July 1, 1881, and existing tenants were evicted.

=== Museum use: 1881–present ===
==== 1880s renovation ====
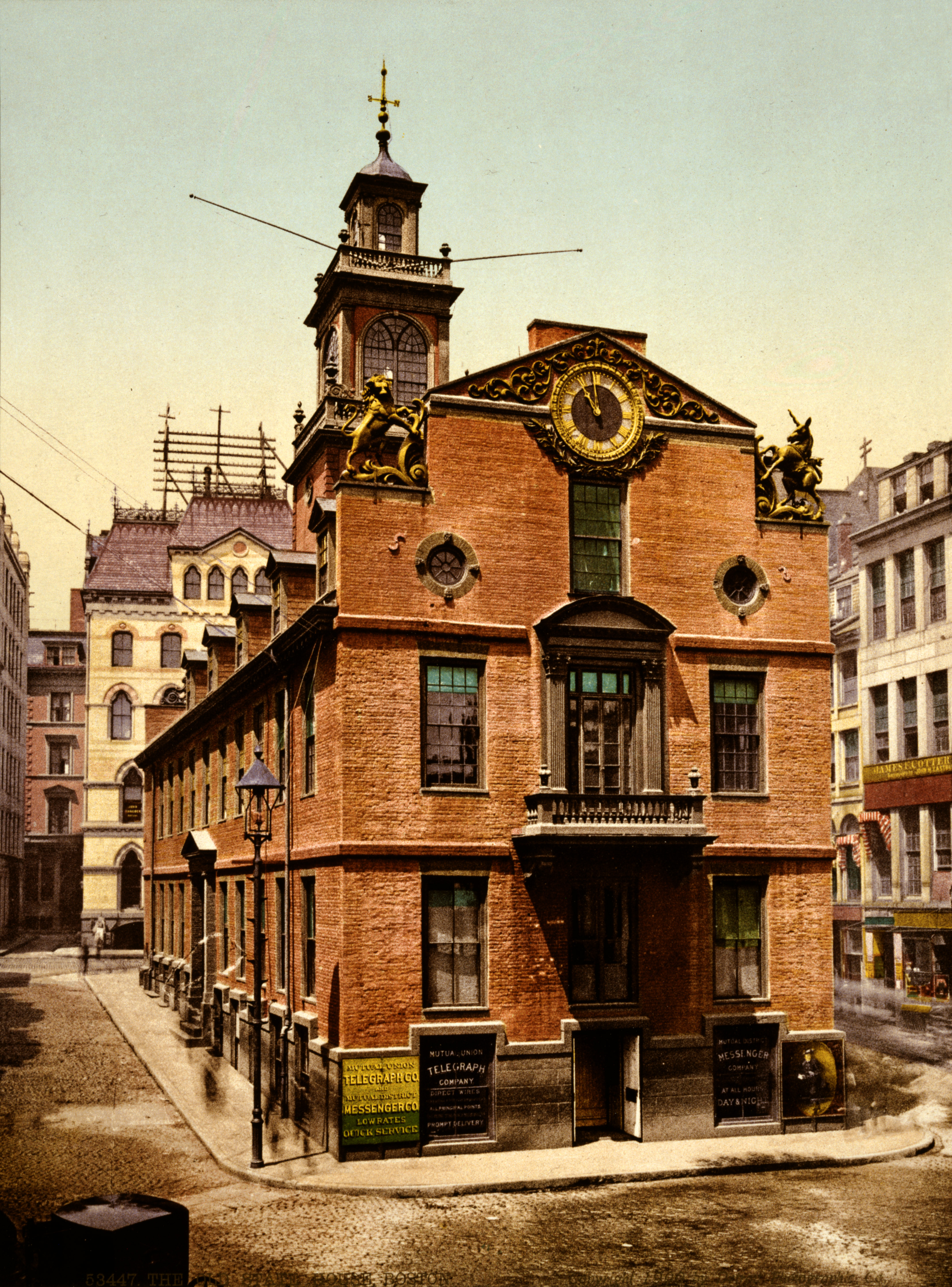
Eastern and southern elevations, c. 1886

The Bostonian Society (originally the Antiquarian Club) was established in 1881 to preserve the Old State House. That June, the City Council passed a resolution sponsored by Whitmore, which allocated $35,000 (Note: Equivalent to $1,003,000 in 2025) for the renovation of the exterior, stair, and upper-story interiors. After a local bank offered to pay for the restoration, the City Council wished to accept this plan, but Whitmore argued that a private-sector restoration would be destructive. The council allocated these funds to the Committee on Public Buildings in September, while rejecting a proposal to lease out the building. The city government's architect, George A. Clough, designed the renovation, which took six months. The modifications were completed in late June 1882, and the building was rededicated on July 11. The Bostonian Society first met there on October 10 and initially had its offices, exhibit space, and storage rooms on the second and third stories. The following week, two city government agencies moved to the building, occupying the first story's eastern end. The lower stories were rented out by the city for up to $20,000 a year. (Note: Equivalent to $575,000 in 2025) The Mutual District Messenger Company (later the Mutual Union Telegraph Company) occupied the basement, and two transportation companies leased space near Washington Street.

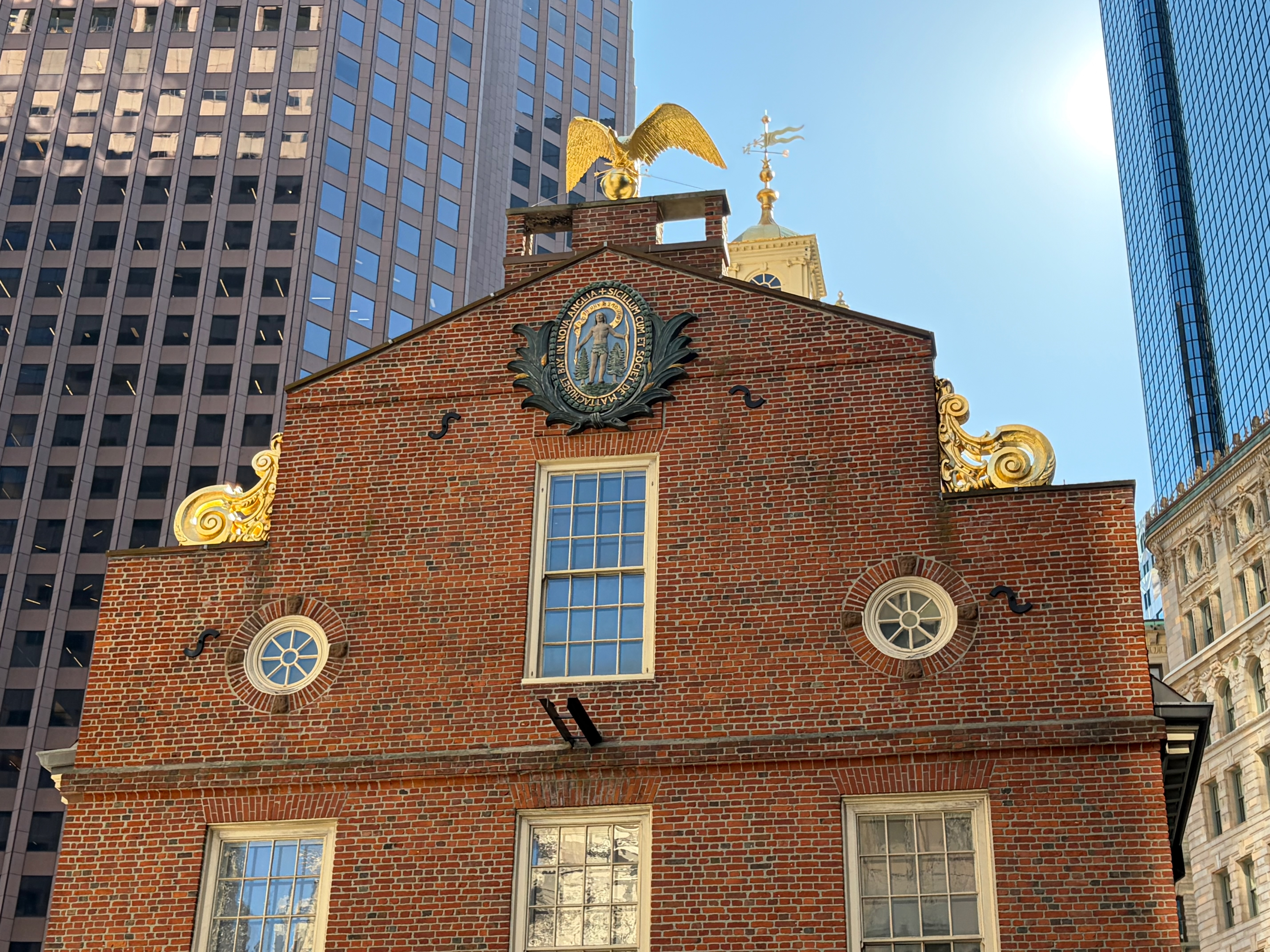
Detail of western elevation, upper levels

The lower stories' exterior underwent few changes, while the upper stories' exterior was restored to it 18th-century appearance. The basement's facade and the northern and southern elevations' doorways largely retained their appearances, which dated from Isaiah Rogers's 1830 renovation. Clough replaced the eastern entrance with brick walls, doors, and windows, and he added windows to the western elevation. The sash windows on the second and third floors were replaced. The mansard roof was removed, though the cornice and trusses underneath were in good condition and were retained. The extremely dilapidated rooftop tower was almost completely reconstructed. Replicas of the original, burned lion and unicorn statues were placed atop the eastern elevation, as the city government considered them important parts of the original design. The lion and unicorn decorations elicited objections, with one observer calling them "an outrage on the memory of our fathers". Clough also added the Massachusetts coat of arms and a gilded eagle to the western elevation. Because city officials disagreed on where the eagle should be positioned, it was not in place when the building reopened; it had been installed atop the roof by 1884. (Note: Ofenstein 1977 cites the eagle as having been installed sometime between 1882 and 1893, but a Washington Post article from 1884 cites the roof as already having the lion, unicorn, and eagle decorations.)

More contentious was the interior, which was returned to its 1830 appearance. Whitmore had discovered Rogers's plans in a Cincinnati archive and confused them with the 1748 plans, believing that Rogers's modifications had been limited to small repairs. Whitmore convinced Clough to restore the building per Rogers's plans. The City Hall–era spiral staircase was restored, and four anterooms were built around the staircase on the second floor. On that floor, Clough retained the curved walls of the Representatives' Chamber and added Federal-style motifs to the Council Chamber. Workers also installed a heating system with a boiler room and chimneys. When the renovation was completed, the historian George Henry Moore criticized the plans as anachronistic, taking particular issue with the second story's layout. Moore's dissatisfaction led to a two-year feud with Whitmore, even as the latter acknowledged and even implemented many of Moore's criticisms.

==== Mid-1880s to 1900s ====
In 1884, the City Council granted the Mutual District Messenger Company permission to install exterior signage, despite protests from the public. Vandals attempted to remove the lion and unicorn figures three years later, amid continuing anti-British sentiment from Boston's Irish population. After outgrowing its existing space, the Bostonian Society leased the rest of the building in 1894. By then, the building had 17,000 annual visitors, and the society had nearly a thousand members. The city government agencies and the remaining merchants were evicted, and the first floor was converted into a three-room suite with secretary's and director's offices; the basement telegraph office remained. A new unicorn and lion's head (the latter with a time capsule) were mounted on the eastern elevation in 1901, and the eagle was regilded in 1905.

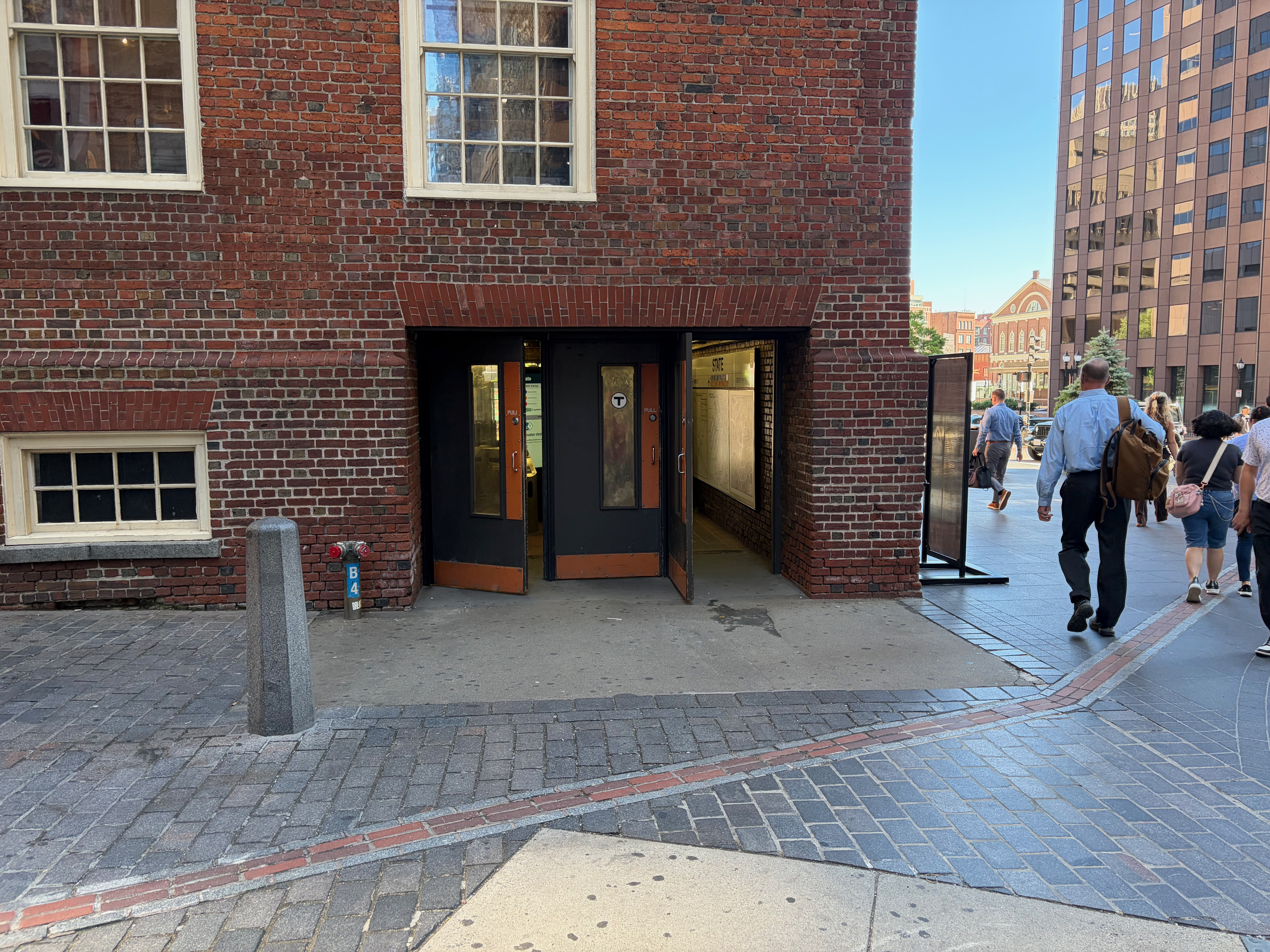
A subway entrance was added to the basement in 1903. This entrance is on the southern side of the building.

By 1898, the Boston Transit Commission planned to construct the Boston subway's State station next to the basement. There would be two intersecting subway lines: the East Boston Tunnel under State Street (now part of the Blue Line) and the Washington Street Tunnel (now part of the Orange Line). The transit commissioners wanted to construct a subway entrance in the Old State House by 1902. Though the commissioners could theoretically seize and demolish the building, local preservation groups opposed any demolition, and efforts to move it to Boston Common also failed. Woodbury & Leighton received the subway entrance's construction contract in January 1903. The modifications proceeded largely without issue, despite some objections from local groups. An entrance lobby for the station was built in the eastern portion of the basement, requiring the telegraph office to relocate. Workers gutted the basement, raised the eastern portion of the first story, modified the windows on the eastern elevation, and added an entryway to the subway lobby's north wall. Excavation of the tunnel required shoring up the building from underneath. The Bostonian Society temporarily relocated during construction and, in late 1903, re-leased the whole building aside from the subway lobby. The East Boston Tunnel opened in 1904.

In 1903, the State station was approved as one of the Washington Street line's stations. When the transit commission proposed further modifying the Old State House two years later, the Bostonian Society initially agreed to the plans. Significant public objections subsequently arose, led by preservationist William Sumner Appleton; one source wrote that the previous renovations had already "almost irreparably damaged" the building. Following advocacy from preservationists, in 1907, the General Court passed legislation mandating the building's restoration and prohibiting further subway-related changes, including a Washington Street subway entrance. Joseph Everett Chandler was hired for the restoration, and the city also allocated funding to repair the north elevation, which cracked due to the Washington Street Tunnel's construction. The tunnel opened in 1908. The next year, workers began carrying out Chandler's design. Work included removing paint, redesigning the entrances, replacing the granite foundation with brick, and redesigning Keayne Hall on the first floor's west end. Workers also restored the eastern elevation's balcony, modified the basement, and replaced some interior columns. Two tablets, commemorating the building's history, were added to the facade. The city and state governments split the construction cost equally.

==== 1910s to 1950s ====
Chandler's renovation was finished by early 1910. The Boston Elevated Railway, the Washington Street line's operator, was compelled that February to remove signs it had installed on the facade, and a coat of arms on the western elevation was dedicated in June. The Bostonian Society reorganized the exhibits and renamed two first-floor rooms after Robert Keayne (who had funded the First Town-House) and William Henry Whitmore. The society added a maritime exhibit to Keayne Hall, which was operated by the newly formed Boston Marine Museum. The state government began providing some funding for the building that year. The Bostonian Society continued to lease the building; the city refused to lease to any other tenant, effectively preserving the structure. Its exterior clock was part of Boston's fire alarm system and was maintained by the Boston Fire Department. The building had 45,000 annual visitors by the mid-1910s.

The city government provided money for fireproofing work in 1917, and a lit cigarette caused another fire in April 1921, burning parts of the attic and the roof trusses. The building was consequently closed for several months; the same year, an automatic fire-alarm system was added, and replicas of the lion and unicorn figures were installed. No sprinklers were installed because of concerns that the water would ruin invaluable artifacts. Two commemorative tablets for the building were cast in 1931, though there was considerable opposition to their installation, on the grounds that the plaques had misleading inscriptions. During the beginning of that decade, the city also repaired the tower, expanded the fire alarm system to cover the entire building, and divided the third floor into two sections. The facade was repainted in 1935. The next year, the exterior was floodlit, and Works Progress Administration (WPA) workers repaired the roof. WPA researchers also found over two thousand documents in an unsuccessful attempt to partially restore the building to original plans.

The idea of restoring the building resurfaced in 1942, though the original plans had still not been located. The next year, architectural firm Perry, Shaw and Hepburn renovated the building's Council Chamber. The room was redecorated with Georgian details. The Boston government continued to own the Old State House in the mid-20th century, and the Bostonian Society still operated it as a museum with free admission. In 1947, the Marine Museum merged with the Bostonian Society, which continued to host maritime exhibits there. The next year, the exterior (including the rooftop decorations) was restored. The building was repaired again in the mid-1950s as part of a project designed by George Sherwood. After workers repaired water damage, the exterior was restored to its 18th-century appearance. The project, which cost over $50,000, (Note: Equivalent to $453,000 in 2025) included repairing decorations such as the water table, brickwork, and window openings. By the late 1950s, Boston officials claimed that it was too expensive to maintain the Old State House. The Massachusetts Senate passed a bill in 1957, allowing the state government to acquire and maintain the building, but the Massachusetts House rejected it the next year. Further exterior repairs occurred in 1958 and 1959.

==== 1960s to 1990s ====
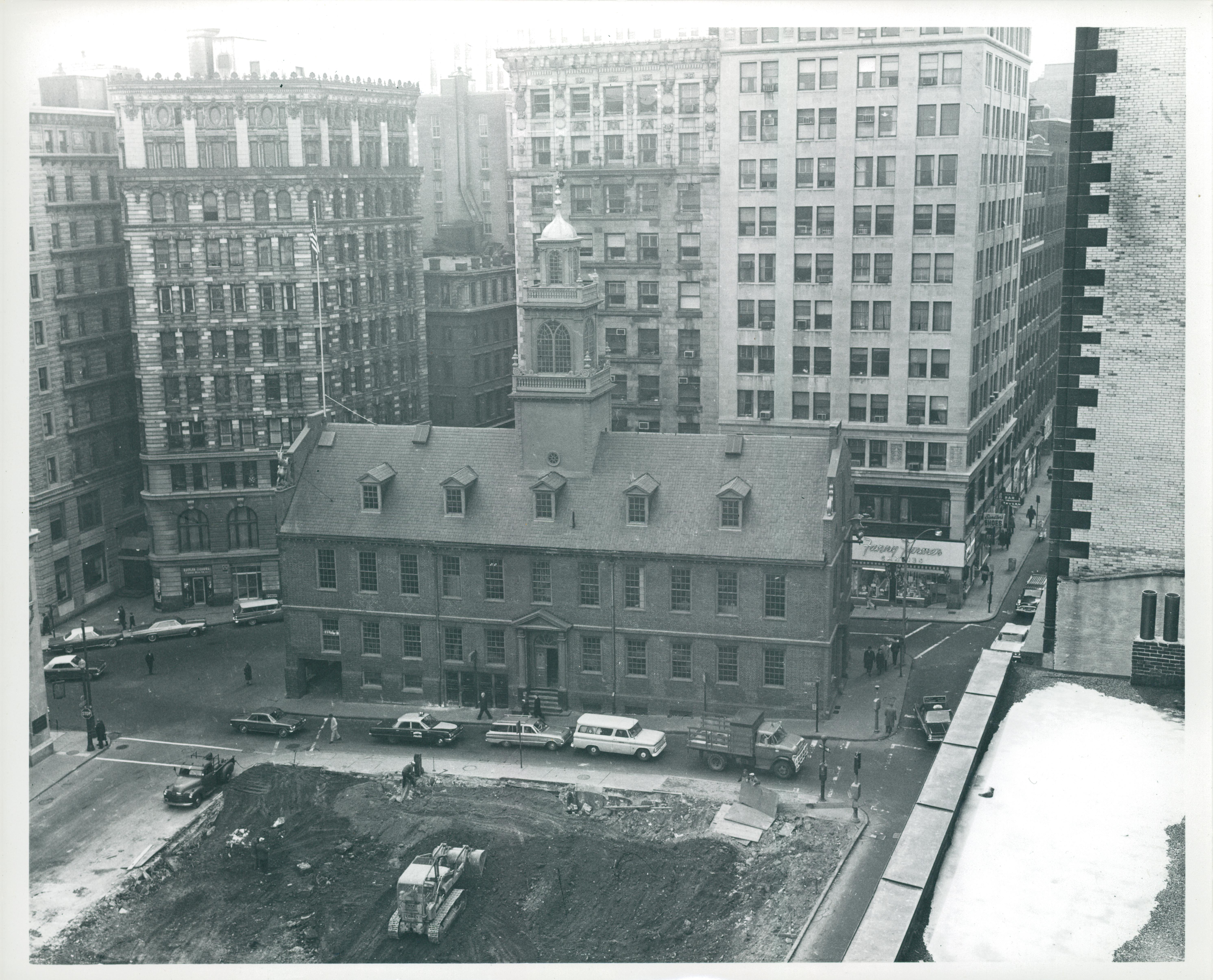
The building viewed from the north during the 1960s

In the early 1960s, the Massachusetts General Court again considered taking over maintenance; Boston's government also urged the federal government to assume operations, amid efforts to make the building a national historic site (see § Landmark designations and media). There were again unsuccessful efforts to move the building, this time to Government Center. By 1972, the building had 2,000 daily visitors. To reduce crowding, the Bostonian Society began charging admission that year; admission fees were waived for state residents each January. In the mid-1970s, the roadway south of the Old State House (formerly part of State Street) was converted to a pocket park and became a pedestrian zone. The building had fallen into disrepair by that decade, and the subway lobby's windows and doorways were modified.

In advance of the United States Bicentennial, in 1974, the Bostonian Society raised $250,000 for a restoration (Note: Equivalent to $1,099,000 in 2025) as part of the National Register of Historic Places' grant-in-aid program. The building was closed for one year, reopening in May 1976. During the Bicentennial celebration, Queen Elizabeth II and her husband Prince Philip toured the building on July 11, 1976. Elizabeth II gave an address from the balcony:

If Paul Revere, Samuel Adams, and other patriots could have known that one day a British monarch would stand on the balcony of the Old State House, from which the Declaration of Independence was first read to the people of Boston, and be greeted in such kind and generous words—well, I think they would have been extremely surprised! But perhaps they would also have been pleased to know that eventually we came together again as free peoples and friends to defend together the very ideals for which the American Revolution was fought.

In 1979, the Bostonian Society moved its library from the basement into a nearby National Park Service (NPS) building. On the centennial of the building's rededication, in 1982, the NPS allocated $70,000 (Note: Equivalent to $197,000 in 2025) for restoring the roof tower and its cupola. U.S. Representative Joe Moakley requested federal funds for further renovations in April 1985. Ultimately, Congress proposed a combined $8.6 million for the Old State House and Faneuil Hall, (Note: Equivalent to $22,518,000 in 2025) allocating $600,000 for design. (Note: Equivalent to $1,571,000 in 2025) By then, the Old State House had 80,000 annual visitors. The building needed an estimated $3.9 million in renovations, (Note: Equivalent to $10,212,000 in 2025) having been weakened by passing subway trains and the construction of nearby skyscrapers. The facade was cracking, and the interiors and utility systems also needed extensive repairs. A US House of Representatives panel approved $500,000 in 1987 for preliminary studies of the Old State House. (Note: Equivalent to $1,214,000 in 2025)

The building closed for renovations in late 1990, and Goody, Clancy and Associates was hired as the preservation architect. The facade's cracks were repaired, as were the corroded support beams underneath, which dated from the subway's construction and had never been replaced. Workers modified the roof trusses, which could not handle heavy crosswinds; the trusses were attached to the north and south walls by gravity alone, causing the walls to lean. The work also included upgrading utilities and replacing decayed materials. The appearances of the exhibit halls were restored to different eras. (Note: For example, 1881 (Representatives Chamber), 1907 (Keayne Hall), and 1943 (Council Chamber). The Boston Landmarks Commission wrote that the spaces were returned to their appearance as of their last significant renovation, while Architecture: The AIA Journal wrote that the spaces were returned to their "most important and best-documented period".) After the renovation was completed in 1992, the building reopened on July 10 that year.

==== 2000s to present ====
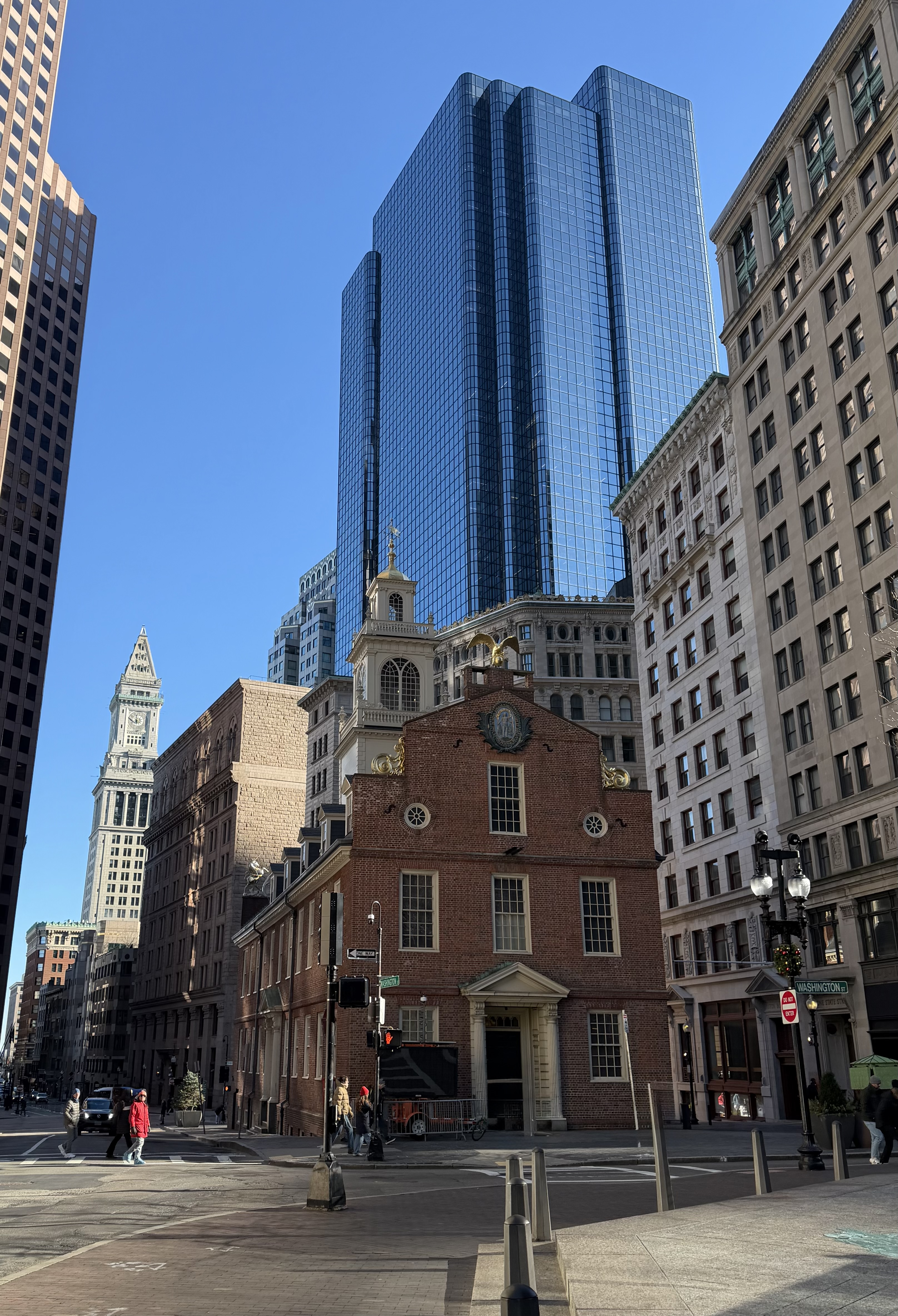
Facade's western elevation surrounded by skyscrapers, 2025

The Old State House needed frequent maintenance due to its age, the wind tunnel effect created by neighboring buildings, and the Boston Harbor nearby. The building's masonry had long experienced water damage and leaks, which were aggravated by Hurricane Wilma in late 2005. Masonry repairs were conducted the next year; at the time, the building needed $3 million in repairs, of which the Bostonian Society had raised about half. The repairs, comprising the first phase of a wider-ranging renovation, was covered in an episode of The History Channel's Save Our History. Further repairs, costing $10 million, began in the late 2000s. These included a major restoration of the museum's tower, which was underway by 2008. The windows were repaired and resealed, and the tower and roof were repaired. The HVAC system was replaced, and new LED lights were installed by 2011.

The lion and unicorn decorations were removed for restoration in 2014 and were reinstalled later that year. Restorers removed the time capsule in the lion decoration, which was replaced with a new capsule. Further renovations in 2017 included the replacement of woodwork and windows. The Bostonian Society and the Old South Meeting House's operator, Old South Association, proposed merging in 2019; the merger was finalized in January 2020 with the creation of a new organization, Revolutionary Spaces. The merger allowed the Old State House and the Old South Meeting House to coordinate their operations, although the buildings' names remained unchanged. The Old State House was temporarily closed from March to August 2020 due to the COVID-19 pandemic. In 2026, Revolutionary Spaces obtained a $286,000 grant through the Save America's Treasures program to finance the building's structural stabilization.

== Architecture ==
The Old State House is a Late Georgian brick building, with a massing or shape dating from the 1748 reconstruction. Measuring 2 1/2 stories high, it has a gable roof oriented west–east. The western and eastern elevations of the facade (under the gables) are divided vertically into three bays, while the northern and southern elevations are divided into eleven bays. The building measures 110 feet (34 m) long by 36 to 38 feet (11 to 12 m) wide, (Note: For the length, several sources cite a figure of 110 feet (34 m). A 1980 report gives a figure of 112 7/12 feet (34.3 m), and a 2021 book gives a length of 118 feet (36 m). For the width, the following figures are given: 36 feet (11 m); 36 1/3 feet (11.1 m); 38 feet (12 m)) relatively large dimensions for an 18th-century building. No single architect is credited with the original design, but various architects including Isaiah Rogers (1830), George Albert Clough (1881–1882), Joseph Everett Chandler (1909), and Goody, Clancy and Associates (1991) designed subsequent renovations.

=== Exterior ===
==== Facade ====
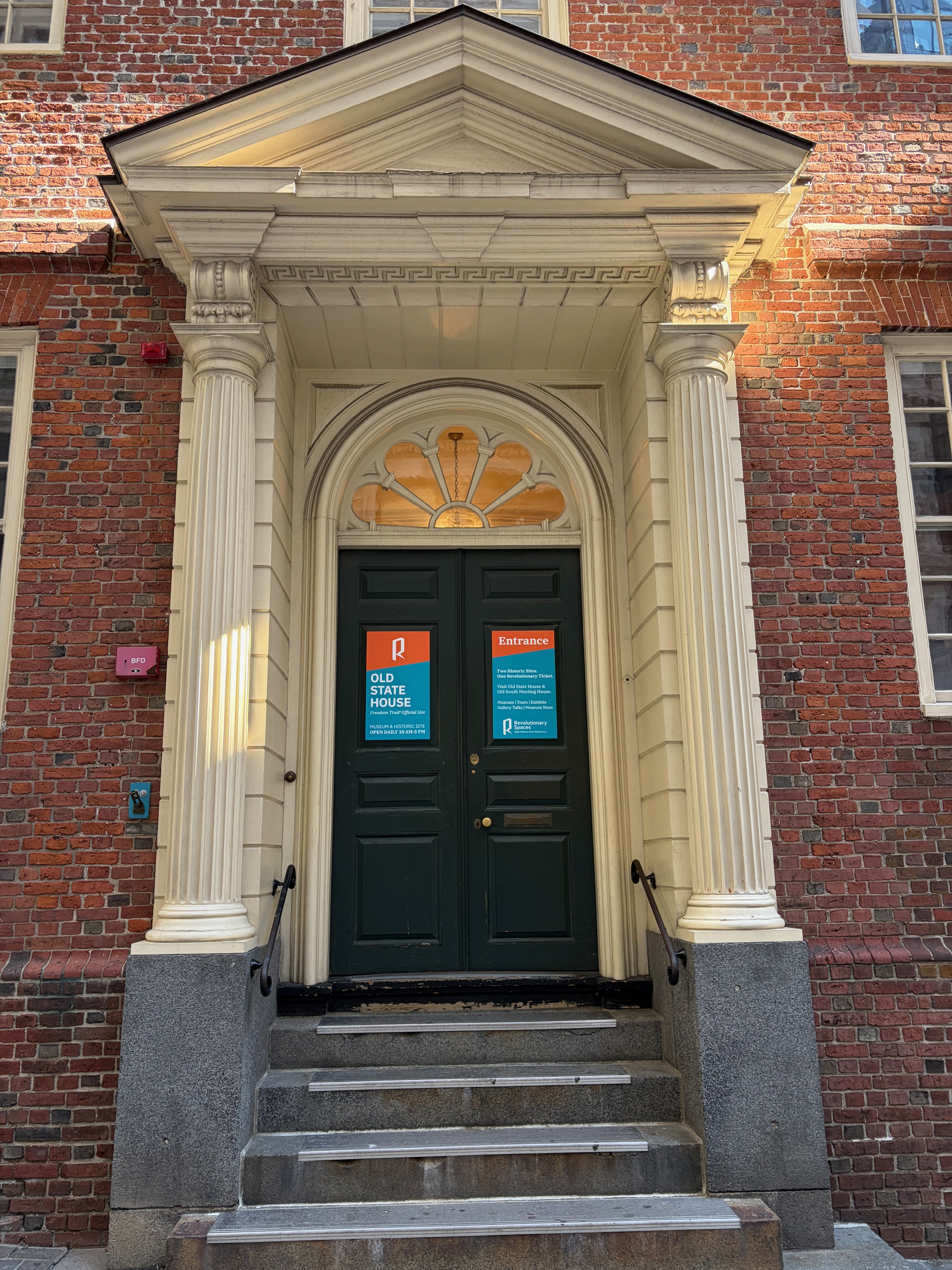
Southern entrance detail

The building's foundation has a water table with small windows, each topped by brick lintels, overlooking the basement. The eastern end of the basement is at ground level, where there are entrances to the State station at the northern and southern elevations. The original foundation walls, replaced when the subway was built in the 1900s, were 28 inches (710 mm) thick. Above the foundation, evidence of 18th-century brickwork is visible on approximately two-thirds of the facade, particularly on most of the northern and southern elevations, and parts of the western elevation. The brickwork between the windows forms vertical piers, which measure 4.5 feet (1.4 m) wide and are 24 inches (610 mm) thick on the first floor, tapering to 20 inches (510 mm) on the second floor.

Entrances, dating from Chandler's 1909 renovation, are recessed from the centers of all except the eastern elevation. Each entrance is flanked by engaged columns in the Doric order, with granite pedestals below and scrolled console brackets above. The columns support triangular pediments. Above the first story, a belt course runs horizontally across the facade. The northern and southern elevations retain some of the original 1712 brickwork; each bay has sash windows on each story, with splayed lintels above. The voussoirs in each lintel are arranged to resemble jack arches, some of which retain their original brickwork. The window openings were originally larger but have been partly infilled; the first-story windows are smaller than those on the second story.

The western and eastern elevations lack any of the original jack arches. On these elevations, the attic has circular ocular windows flanking a central sash window. Each oculus is ornamented with a cast stone replica of the building's original Coade stone decorations. On the eastern elevation is a small second-floor balcony resting on console brackets or volutes, which dates from Chandler's renovation. There is a French door behind the balcony, which is flanked by pilasters in the Corinthian order, topped by a rounded pediment. The eastern elevation's gable has a clock designed in 1830 or 1831 by Simon Willard. A sundial by local architect George Sherwood was installed in front of the clock in 1957; the sundial was removed in the 1990s when the clock was repaired.

==== Roof ====
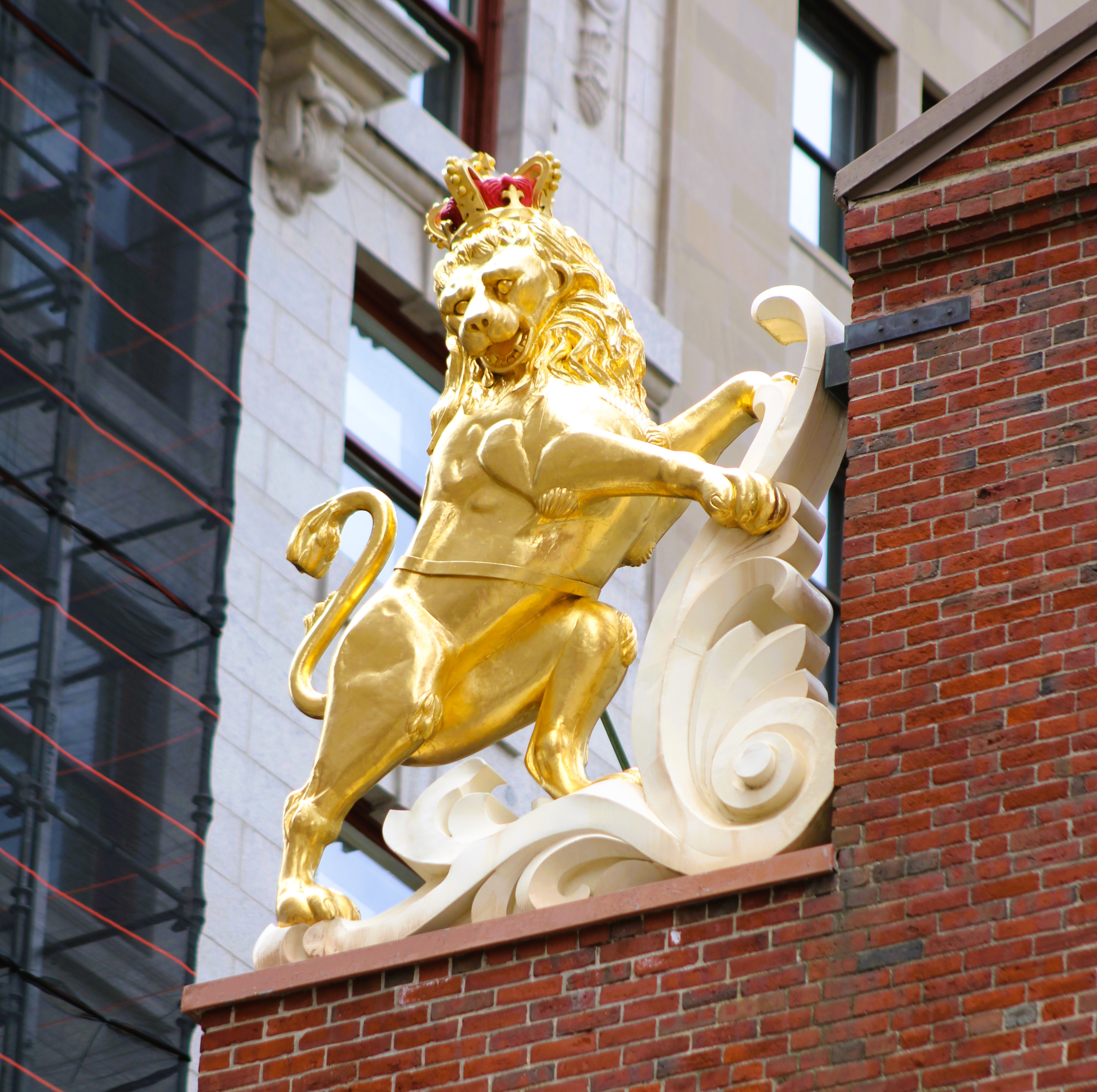

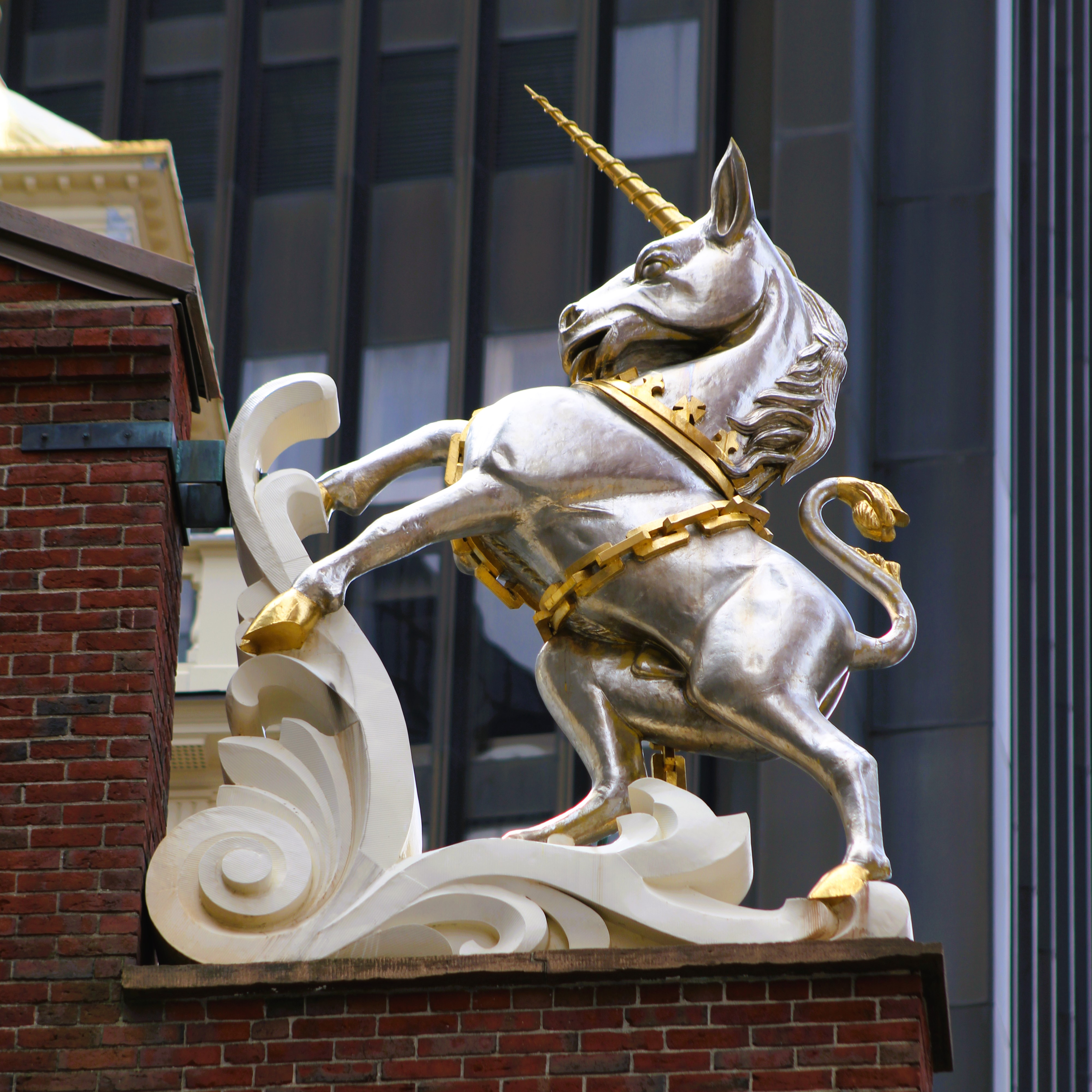
Detail of the unicorn on the building's parapet

The lion and unicorn on the parapets at the eastern end of the building are the same used in the Coat of Arms of the United Kingdom, a reminder of the building's past.

The Old State House's roof has slate tiles, with five protruding dormers each on its north and south sides; each dormer has a sash window topped by a pediment. Baroque-style gilded scrolls are attached to the steps in the gables' parapets, referencing the building's former function as the State Capitol. On the western parapet, the building features a statue of a gilded eagle perched atop a small gilded globe. A pair of figures depicting a lion and unicorn, symbols of the British monarchy, are on the eastern parapet.

A three-tiered tower extends 70 feet (21 m) above the attic. The lowest tier is square and has oculus windows, quoins at the corners, and posts predating the 1921 fire. The central tier has arched windows with Doric pilasters and tracery, while the highest tier has smaller arched windows with Ionic pilasters; these decorations are made of wood. A dome surmounts the tower.

=== Interior ===
The interior's current layout dates from Clough's 1882 renovation and includes decorations from later renovations. The basement has service areas and a subway entrance lobby. At the center of the building, a spiral stair runs from the basement to the second floor, passing through a rotunda at the first and second floors. Both stories have exhibit rooms flanking the rotunda—Keayne and Whitmore halls on the first floor, and the former Representatives' and Council chambers on the second floor. The second story also has four anterooms near the rotunda.

A boiler flue exists at the building's eastern end. There are radiators throughout the building (some dating from as early as the late 19th century), along with more modern plumbing fixtures. On the first floor are eight columns oriented along a west–east axis, which replaced older columns during the 19th-century renovations. The structural system also includes ten girders below the second floor and ten trusses under the roof, both running north–south. The girders rest on joists and are supported by the first-floor columns. The second floor lacks interior columns.

==== Basement ====
The subway lobby occupies the eastern half of the basement and leads to the Blue Line and northbound Orange Line platforms. The lobby cannot be expanded because the entire building is subject to national landmark protections. The western half has mechanical and storage space. At the center of the basement is a staircase landing below the first-floor rotunda. The landing's curved walls have plaster finishes and segmentally arched doorways; the eastern wall has been modified to avoid the subway lobby. Two bathrooms abut the stair landing. The rest of the basement has columns supporting the first floor, and there are also partitions at the western end. A boiler room is located at the basement's southwest corner.

==== First floor ====
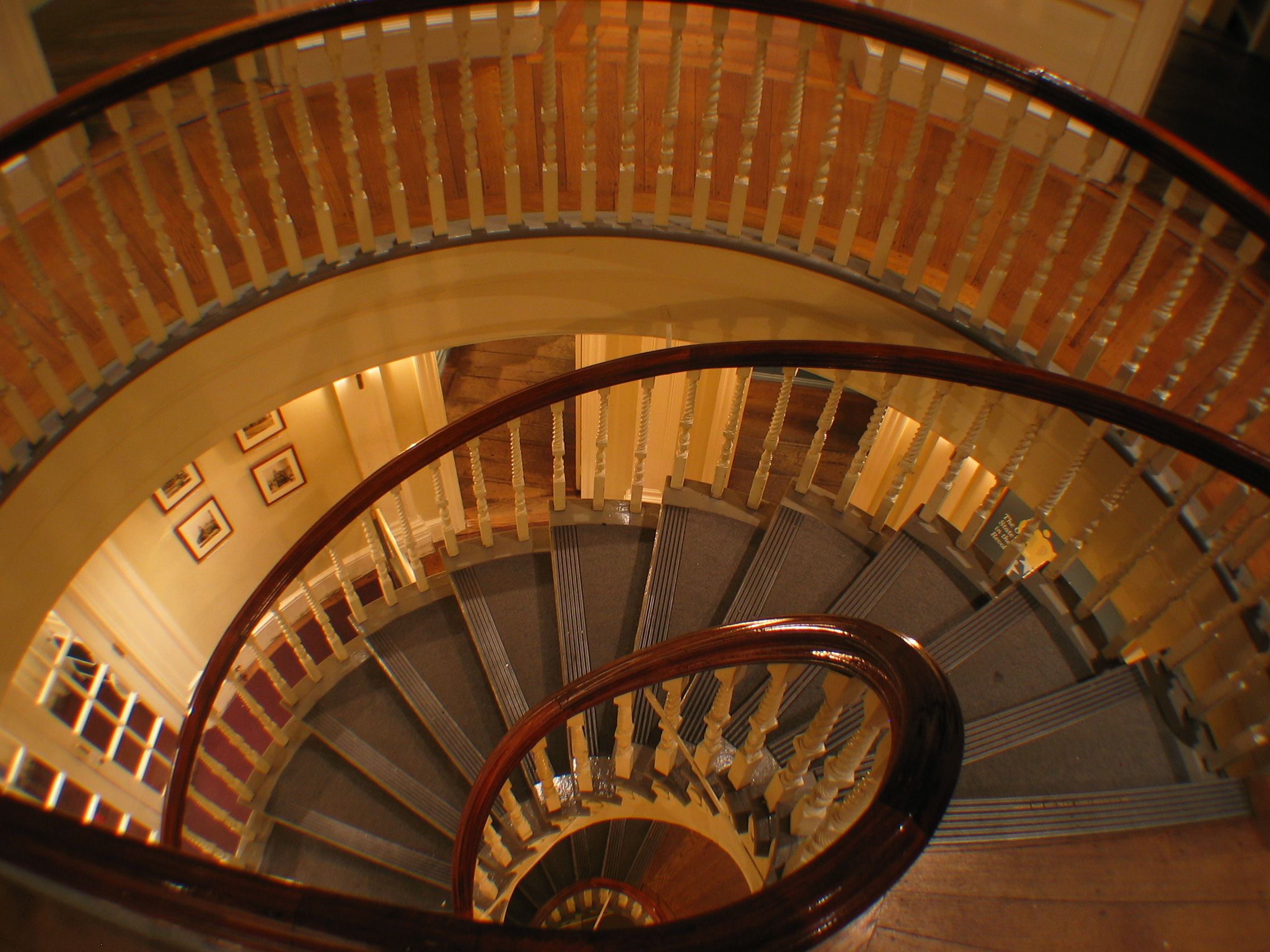
The spiral staircase in the rotunda

The rotunda has a circular plan measuring 18 feet (5.5 m) in diameter. It has a concrete floor and segmentally arched doorways, along with paneled pilasters along the walls. On the first floor, the curved doors on the west and east walls lead respectively to Keayne and Whitmore halls, while the north and south walls lead to entrance vestibules. The rotunda's walls are topped by a dado, dado rail, and cornice, and the ceiling has a plaster rosette. The anteroom doors on the second floor are curved. The foyers abutting the rotunda on both levels have wainscoting and chair rails on their walls, along with cornices that have fretwork. The staircase itself, designed in the Colonial Revival style, has two types of balusters, along with scrollwork on its treads. The staircase balusters, as rebuilt in the 1880s, were inspired by those in the Shirley–Eustis House in Roxbury.

Keayne Hall, at the first floor's western end, dates from the 1900s renovation, with four columns down its center. This room measures 42 by 28 feet (12.8 by 8.5 m) across and is mostly rectangular, except for the east wall abutting the rotunda, which curves inward. Keayne Hall has a wooden floor and molded decorative details, including trim and cornices. The plaster walls have paneled wainscoting and cyma recta and ovolo moldings; the west wall has a paneled door leading outside. The ceiling is also made of plaster.

To the east is Whitmore Hall, measuring 25 by 28 feet (7.6 by 8.5 m), which is raised about 19 inches (480 mm) from the rest of the first floor to avoid interfering with the State station entrance lobby's ceiling. The room formerly extended farther east, but the easternmost end of the first floor has since been partitioned into a library and secretary's office. Like Keayne Hall, Whitmore Hall has wooden floors and plaster walls and ceilings. It also has molded decorative details, including a mopboard and a cornice with a stepped profile. There were formerly four columns running through Whitmore Hall and between the library and secretary's office, but the easternmost column was removed around 1903.

==== Second floor and attic ====
West of the stair hall's second story, a corridor leads between two anterooms, the Commission and Patriots rooms. This corridor connects with the Representatives' Chamber (or Representatives' Hall). Measuring 34 by 28 feet (10.4 by 8.5 m), it is designed in the Colonial Revival style. The floor is made of wood, and the plaster ceiling features a rosette. The walls are made of plaster and have paneled wainscoting, a chair rail, and a cornice with fretwork and rosettes. The west wall has two fireplaces flanking a window, although the north fireplace was sealed when a boiler flue was installed. The east wall is concave, adjoining the anterooms' curved walls. The doorways have elaborate molding and decorations, but the doors to the anterooms have been removed.

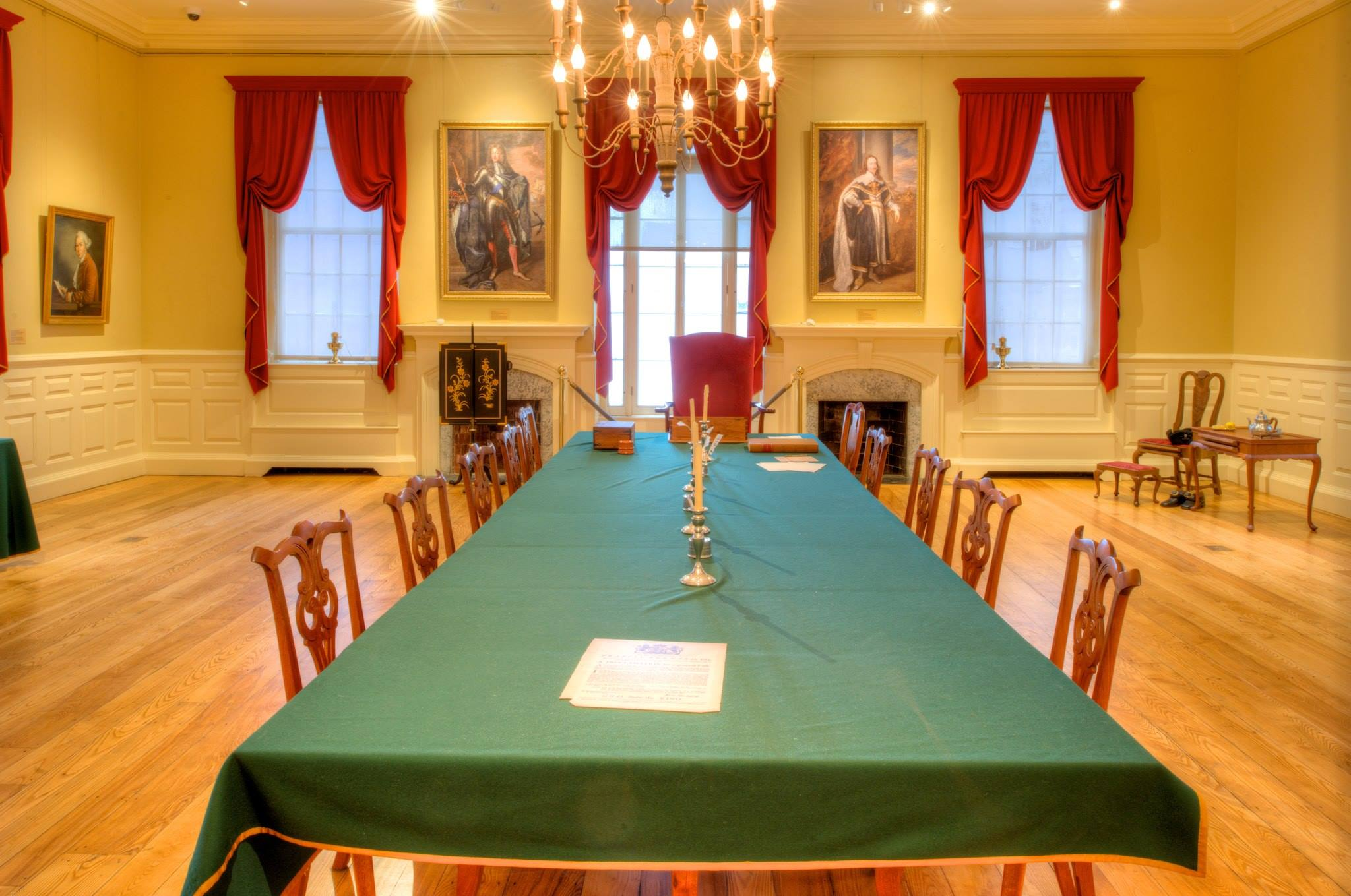
The Council Chamber

Another corridor east of the stair hall leads between two more anterooms: the Henry Hastings and Curtis Guild rooms. It connects to the Council Chamber, measuring 30 by 28 feet (9.1 by 8.5 m). The Council Chamber's current design, dating from the 1943 renovation, has Georgian-style decorations. The floor is made of wood, and the ceiling is made of plaster. The plaster walls have two tiers of wainscoting, a chair rail, and a stepped cornice. (Note: Multiple sources: The chair rail: The other decorations:) The eastern wall has an opening leading to the balcony, with a window on either side; there are fireplaces between the windows and balcony opening. There are seating areas within the recessed windows. The western door is topped by a replica of a lion and unicorn motif. A royal coat of arms was removed from the Council Chamber during the Revolution by fleeing Loyalists; the coat of arms was installed at Trinity Anglican Church in Saint John, New Brunswick, in 1791.

From the second story, a curved stair with wooden treads, a balustrade, and a railing leads to the attic. The attic's western portion has offices, and the eastern portion lacks finishes; the wooden and plasterwork decorations largely date from the 1882 renovation, except for some repairs made after a 1921 fire. A third stair ascends from the attic within the roof tower. The tower stair is designed in the Greek Revival style and likely dates from the 1830s, with uneven wooden treads. The interior of the tower's lowest tier is divided into two levels, each accessed by a doorway from the stair. These levels contain wooden decorations, and they had partitions until after 1921. The central and highest tiers also have rooms with wooden details.

== Operation ==
The Old State House has operated as a museum since its 1882 conversion and has been operated by Revolutionary Spaces since 2020. The Boston city government owns the structure. The building is part of the Boston National Historical Park, operated by the NPS, though the agency's involvement is limited to financial support; the Massachusetts state government also provides funding. The museum charges admission and sells combination tickets that include the Old South Meeting House. It hosts free-admission days for local students and families through the Boston Family Days program. Revolutionary Spaces hosts guided tours and also allows self-guided tours.

The Bostonian Society, the museum's original operator, initially displayed artifacts from Boston's history, which were sourced from its own collections. The objects included portraits and busts, objects relating to the building, and pieces from Boston's and Massachusetts's colonial history. Keayne Hall was used for maritime displays. After a century of exhibiting the Bostonian Society's collection, the museum added United States Bicentennial exhibits in 1975. The exhibits were overhauled in the 1980s. The attic stores additional objects, as the public rooms could display only 3% of the collection. Objects in the collection include the cane used in the 1856 assault of Charles Sumner, a flag flown by the Sons of Liberty, and clothes worn by U.S. Founding Father John Hancock. By the 21st century, the museum's collection focused on the rooms and their furnishings, documents, and paintings.

The museum also hosts events such as temporary exhibits, talks, a monthly showcase, reenactments and theatrical shows. A reenactment of the Boston Massacre takes place outside the building every March 5, and the Declaration of Independence is read outside every July 4. In the early 20th century, musical groups also played Christmas carols from the balcony; this practice was discontinued during World War II. The Bostonian Society formerly also hosted annual receptions. In 2026, to celebrate the United States Semiquincentennial, the Governor's Council ceremonially met at the Old State House.

== Impact and legacy ==
=== Reception ===
==== Historical commentary ====
US President John Adams described the Old State House as the building where "independence was born", citing its role prior to the American Revolution. When the building was renovated in the 1830s, contemporary observers did not appreciate the changes; one source likened the modifications to "plastering and painting a matron very far in years". In 1881, the Massachusetts Ploughman and New England Journal of Agriculture wrote that the building "deserves to stand to 'the last syllable of recorded time'" precisely for its historical importance, while the Boston Daily Globe called it one of Boston's "last relic[s] of pre-revolutionary days" alongside Faneuil Hall, King's Chapel, Old North Church, and Old South Meeting House.

The Detroit Free Press wrote in 1902 that the building's early history was synonymous with that of Boston, and the Daily Globe wrote in 1931 that the collections were as interesting as the Old State House's history. In 1953, the Daily Globe said that the building "is familiar to thousands of history-loving New Englanders" and that, unlike its newer counterpart, it received frequent notice from bystanders. Philip Bergen, the Bostonian Society's librarian in the 1980s, called it "the subway with the oldest historic entrance in the United States". The writer Michael Holleran said in 1998 that the Old State House and Old South Meeting House had survived mainly because of their histories, being "monuments rather than landmarks". A source from 2011 called the building "the center of civic life in the 18th century in Massachusetts".

==== Architectural commentary ====
Regarding the building's architecture, a writer for Century Illustrated Magazine said in 1884 that the Old State House had a charming quality and was "smaller, less costly, more provincial" than its successor. A writer for Redbook called the Old State House "the most beautiful and least changed of Boston's 18th century buildings" in 1962. The Public Interest magazine called the building "a simple volume, large for its time (though dwarfed now) and made gracious by embellishments" in 1984. The Miami Herald described the building in 1990 as "one of the most colorful of Boston's landmarks". The Herald wrote that the roof's lion and unicorn figures signified much-improved United Kingdom–United States relations, while the Chicago Tribune described them as evidence of lasting British influence in Boston. National Parks magazine wrote in 1999 that the building retained both its architectural and historical significance, despite appearing anachronistic compared to the surrounding buildings.

The building has also been compared with nearby structures. A writer for The Youth's Companion said in 1910 that the Old State House, Old South Meeting House, and Faneuil Hall were three old buildings that Bostonians were most proud of. In 1931, the New York Herald Tribune attributed these three buildings and the Park Street Church as "museum pieces in the style of architecture of our own Colonial days". The Globe wrote that the Old State House—along with the Exchange, Second Brazer, and Easton buildings at the intersection with Congress and Devonshire streets—was "an important part of State Street". Journalists from The Boston Globe and The New York Times said that the building's small scale contrasted with the skyscrapers nearby.

=== Replicas ===
Ladies' Home Journal writer Joe Toye said in 1930 that the Old State House had "long been an inspiration for architects throughout America". Replicas have been built in several places in Massachusetts and the eastern US:

- Brockton Fairgrounds, Brockton, Massachusetts
- Curry College, Milton, Massachusetts; traditional residence, northern side
- The Massachusetts building at the Eastern States Exposition ("The Big E"), West Springfield, Massachusetts, which was dedicated in 1919
- The Massachusetts building at the Jamestown, Virginia, Exposition of 1907. The building deteriorated after the exposition and was later demolished.
- The town hall of Weymouth Civic District in Weymouth, Massachusetts, which was built in 1928
- The stepped gables of McKinlock Hall (Leverett House) at Harvard University also bear similarities to those of the Old State House.

=== Landmark designations and media ===
The building was designated a National Historic Landmark (NHL) in 1960, and it was added to the National Register of Historic Places in 1966. A plaque denoting the NHL status was added in 1963. The Old State House is one of eight sites in the 43-acre (17 ha) Boston National Historical Park. The national park was designated in 1974, following the 1960s efforts to designate the Old State House as a national historic site. The exterior and some interior spaces were designated as a Boston Landmark by the Boston Landmarks Commission in 1994.

In conjunction with the Old State House's 1882 renovation, the Bostonian Society published a book about the building's history, printing six editions through 1893. Another book about the Old State House's history was published in 1935. The building was also depicted on a postage stamp released in 1988 and in the 2015 video game Fallout 4.

== Gallery ==
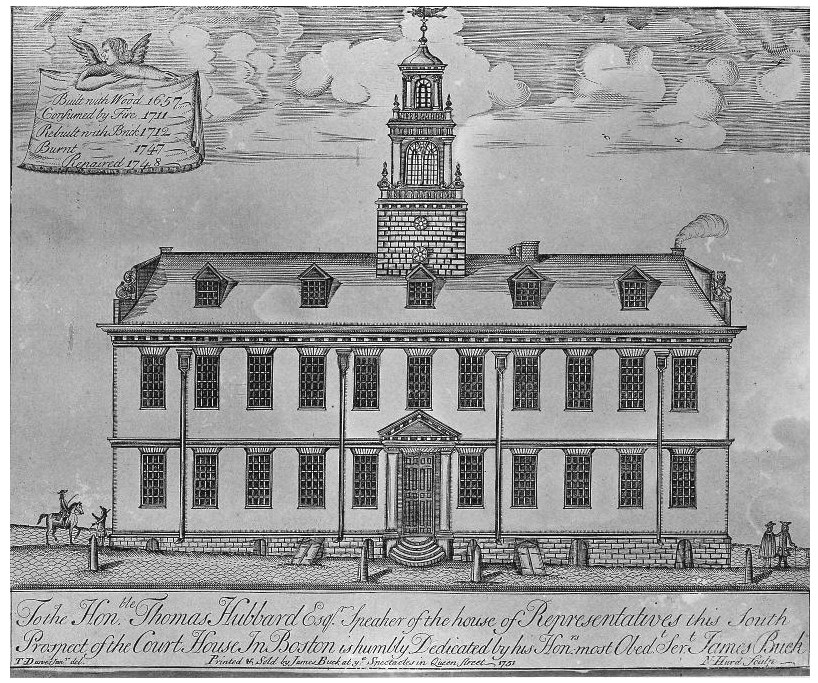
The "Court House", by Thomas Dawes Jr. (artist) and Nathaniel Hurd (engraver), in 1751 (northern elevation)

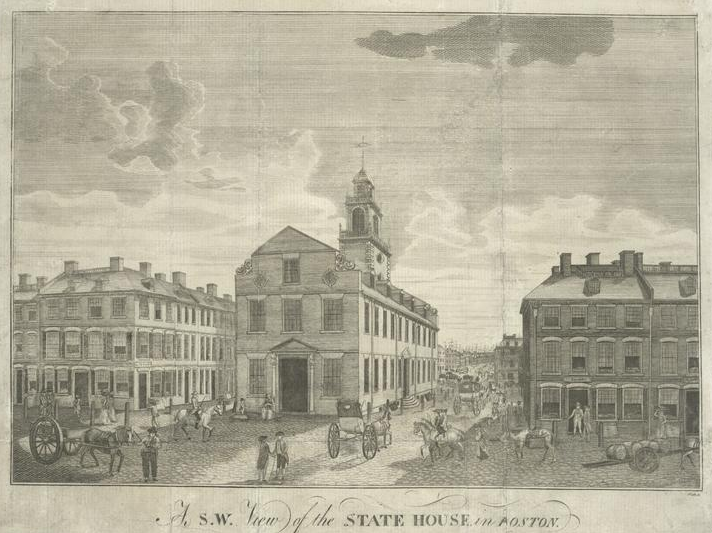
Engraving by Samuel Hill of the western and southern elevations, published in the Massachusetts Magazine, 1793

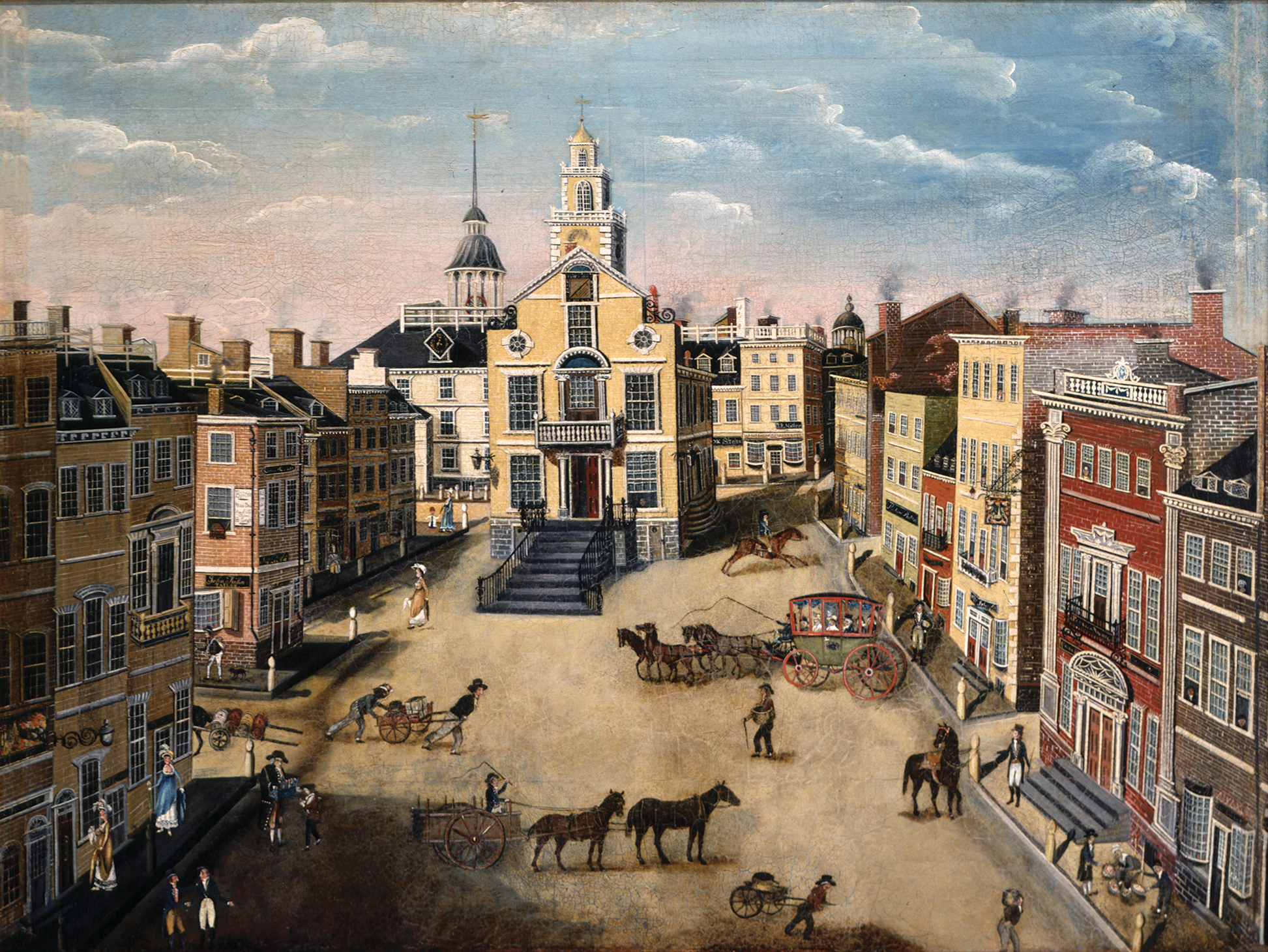
Eastern and northern elevations from State Street, 1801, by J. Marston. The steps and door were removed around fifteen years later

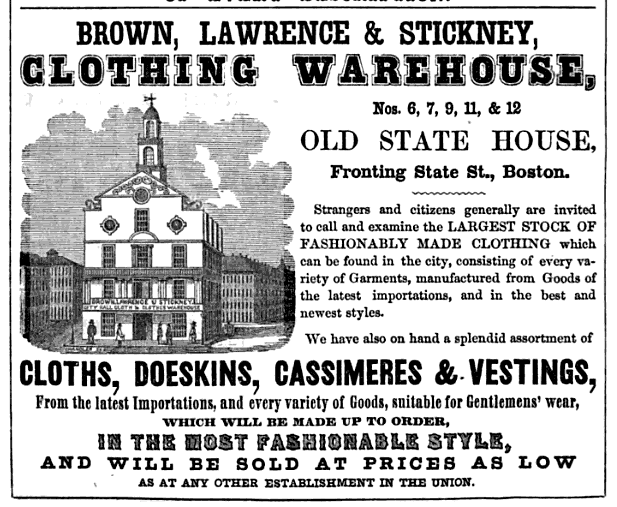
Advertisement for Clothing Warehouse in the Old State House, 1849

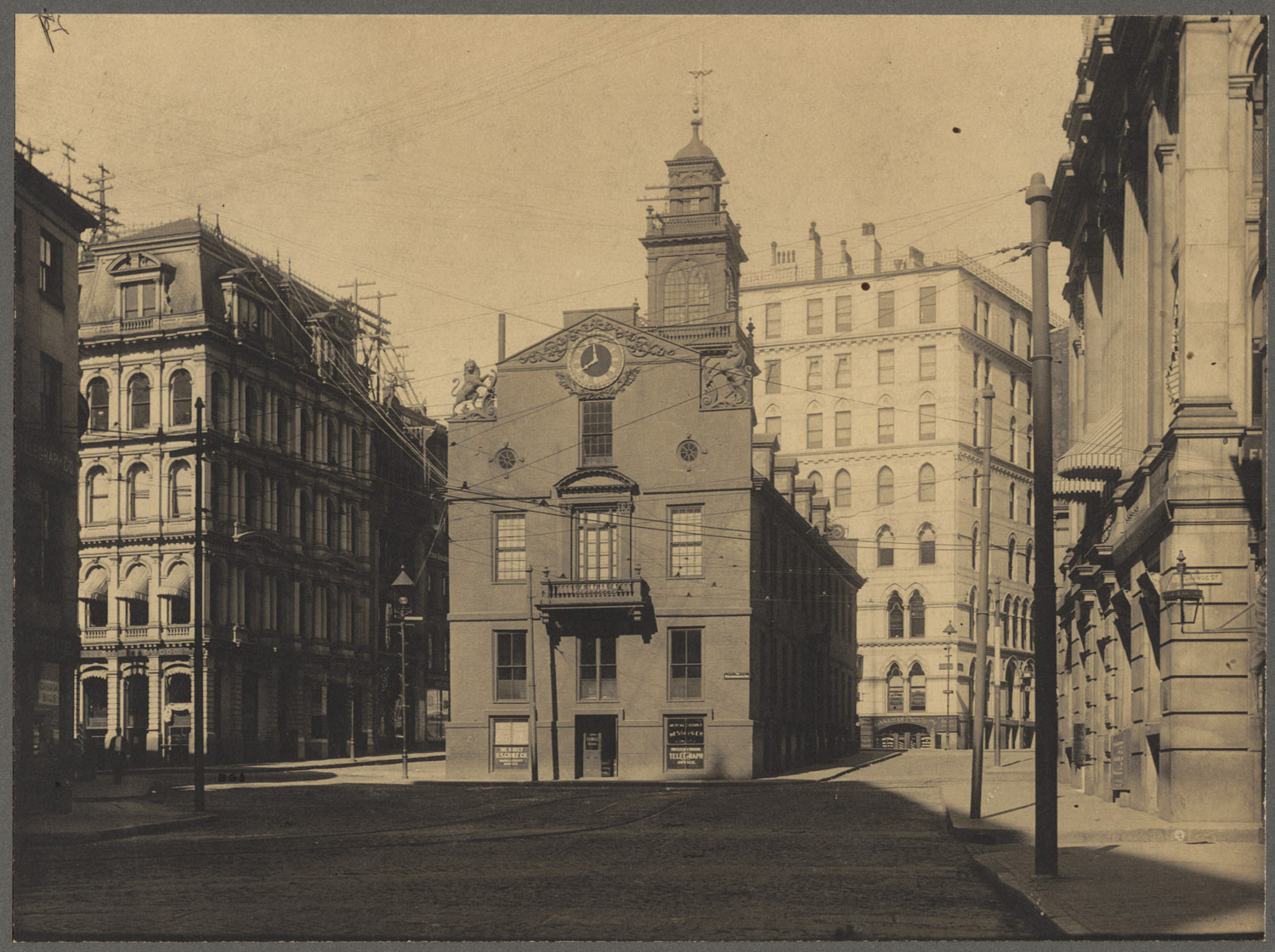
Eastern and northern elevations, c. 1898

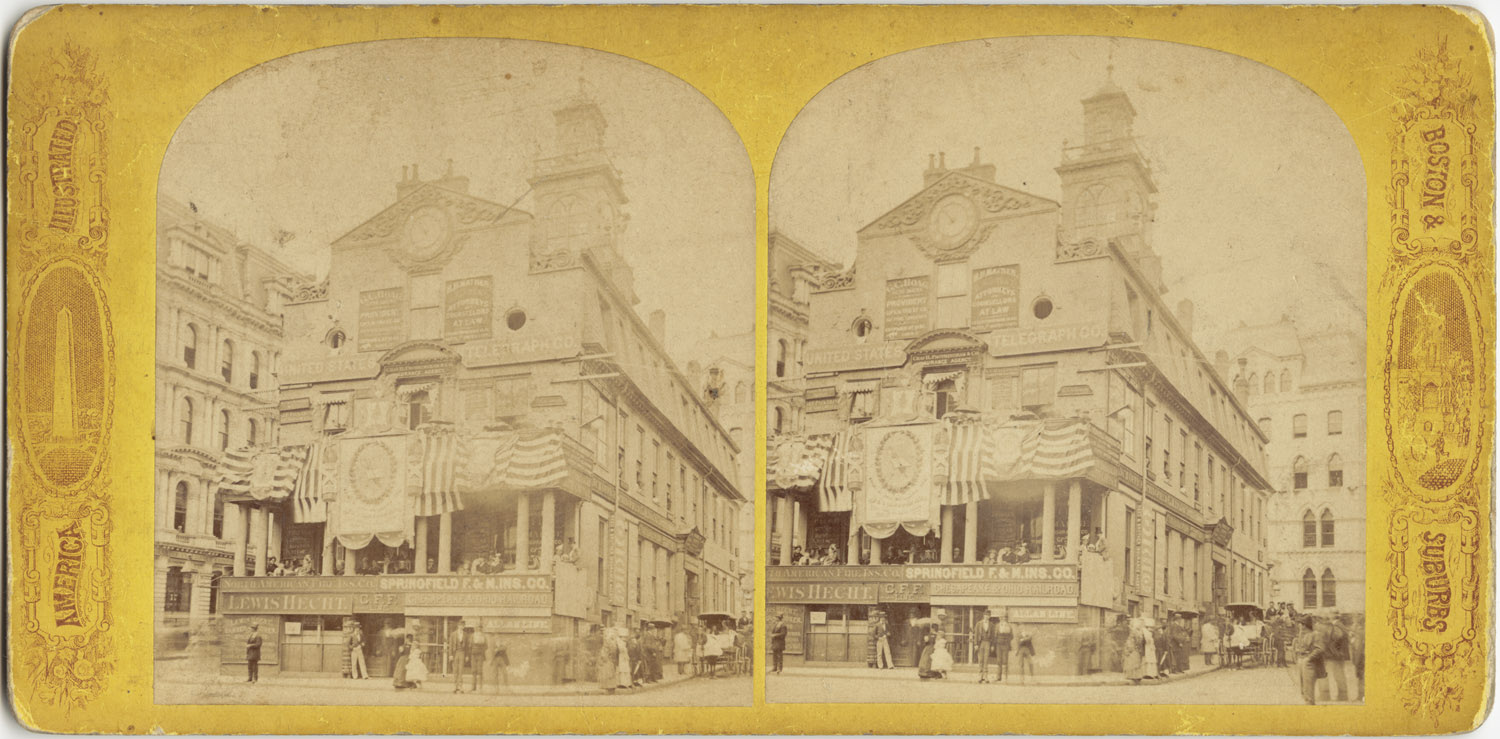
Eastern elevation, 19th century

== See also ==
- List of National Historic Landmarks in Boston
- National Register of Historic Places listings in northern Boston, Massachusetts
- List of members of the colonial Massachusetts House of Representatives

Preceded by Old South Meeting House	Locations along Boston's Freedom Trail; Old State House	Succeeded by Site of the Boston Massacre
Preceded by unknown	Tallest Building in Boston; 1713–1745; 105 feet (32 m)	Succeeded by Old North Church
