= Great Fire =

Great Fire may refer to:

== Fires ==
Listed chronologically

=== Before 1700 ===
- Great Fire of Rome (64 A.D.)
- Great Oulu fire of 1652
- Great Fire of Meireki (1657)
- Great Fire of 1660, in Constantinople (now Istanbul)
- Great Fire of London (1666)
- Great Fire of Northampton (1675)
- Great Fire of Warwick (1694)

=== 1700s ===
- Great Oulu fire of 1705
- Great Boston Fire of 1711
- Great Stockholm Fire of 1759
- Great fire of Tartu (1775)
- Great Boston Fire of 1760
- Great Fire of New York (1776)
- Great New Orleans Fire (1788)
- Great New Orleans Fire (1794)

=== 1800s ===
- Great Fire of Bedford (1802)
- Great Fire of 1805, in Detroit, Michigan
- Great Fire of Stevenage (1807)
- Great Fire of Podil (1811, present-day Kyiv, Ukraine)
- Great fire of Tirschenreuth (1814)
- Great Fire of Edinburgh (1824)
- Great Fire of Turku (1827)
- Great Fire of New York (1835)
- Great fire of Hamburg (1842)
- Great New York City Fire of 1845
- Great Fire of Pittsburgh (1845)
- Great Fire of 1846, in St. John's, Newfoundland
- Great Fire of Bucharest (1847)
- Great Fire of Toronto (1849)
- Great Fire of 1852, in Montreal, Canada
- Great fire of Newcastle and Gateshead (1854)
- Great Fire of Troy (1862), in Troy, New York
- Great fire of Brisbane (1864)
- 1866 great fire of Portland, Maine
- Great Fire of Quebec City (1866)
- Great Fire of Whitstable, 1869
- Great Chicago Fire (1871)
- Great Michigan Fire (1871)
- Great Boston Fire of 1872
- Great Fire of 1873, in Portland, Oregon
- Great Fire of Saint John (1877), in New Brunswick
- Great Oulu fire of 1882
- Great Fire of Key West (1886)
- Great Vancouver Fire (1886)
- Great fire of Cochin (1889)
- Great Seattle Fire (1889)
- Great Spokane Fire (1889)
- Great Fire of 1892, in St. John's, Newfoundland

=== 1900 and later ===
- Great Baltimore Fire (1904)
- Great Fire of Toronto (1904)
- Great Fire of 1910, in Idaho, Montana, and British Columbia
- Great Fire of 1911, in Bangor, Maine
- Great Salem fire of 1914, in Massachusetts
- Centre Block great fire (1916), in Ottawa, Canada
- Great Oulu fire of 1916
- Great Atlanta fire of 1917
- Great Thessaloniki Fire of 1917
- Great fire of Smyrna (1922)
- Great Fire of 1922, in Timiskaming District, Ontario, Canada
- Great Fire of Hakodate (1934)
- Second Great Fire of London (1940)
- Great Fire of Valparaíso (2014)

== Published works ==
Listed chronologically

- The Great Fire (Murphy novel), a 1995 novel by Jim Murphy about the Great Chicago Fire
- The Great Fire (Hazzard novel), a 2003 novel by Shirley Hazzard
- The Great Fire (album), a 2012 album by Bleeding Through
- The Great Fire (TV series), a 2014 drama about the Great Fire of London
- The Great Fire (Vanity Fair), September 2020 issue of Vanity Fair guest-edited by Ta-Nehisi Coates and dedicated to topics of racial justice

== Other uses ==
- GreatFire, a non-profit organization monitoring internet censorship in China
- "Great Fire", a song by XTC from the 1983 album Mummer

== See also ==
- Big Fire, a fictional character in the Giant Robo universe
- List of fires
