= Great Boston Fire =

Great Boston Fire may refer to one of the following events that occurred in Boston, Massachusetts:

- Great Boston Fire of 1711, which destroyed approximately 100 buildings, including the Town House and First Meeting House; several deaths
- Great Boston Fire of 1760, which destroyed 349 buildings in the area between the modern Washington Street and Fort Hill; no reported deaths
- Great Boston Fire of 1872, which consumed about 65 acres (26 ha) of Boston's downtown, 776 buildings, and much of the financial district; 26 to 30 deaths

== See also ==
- Great Fire (disambiguation)
