= Great Oulu fire =

The great Oulu fire may refer to the following fires that have ravaged the city of Oulu, Finland]:

- Great Oulu fire of 1652
- Great Oulu fire of 1705
- Great Oulu fire of 1882
- Great Oulu fire of 1916

== See also ==
- Great Fire (disambiguation)
