= Old Corner Bookstore =

Building in Boston, Massachusetts

- U.S. National Register of Historic Places
- Boston Landmark
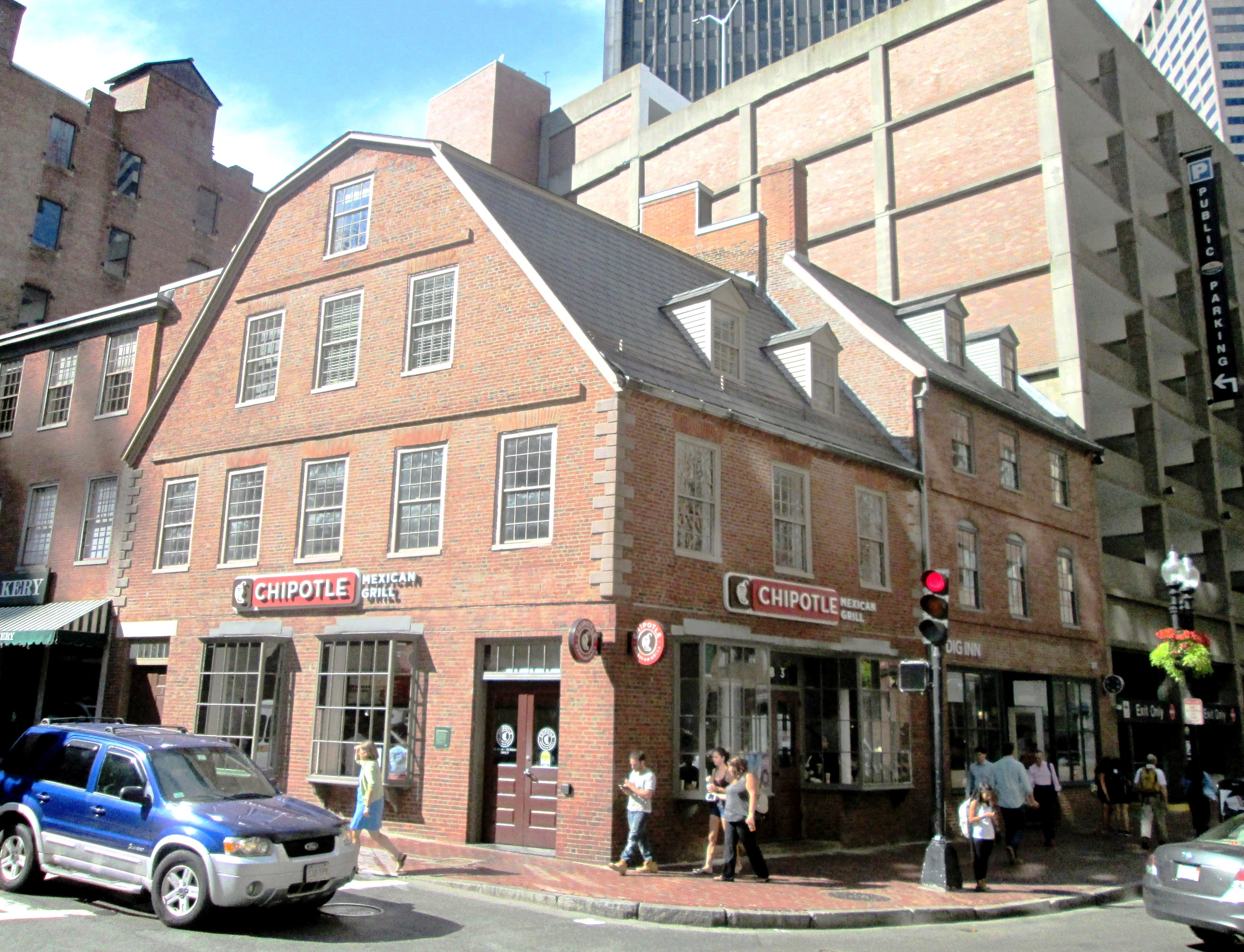
- The building in 2017

- Location within Boston Location within Massachusetts Location within the United States
- Interactive map of Old Corner Bookstore
- Location: 283 Washington Street; Boston, Massachusetts, U.S.
- Coordinates: 42°21′27″N 71°03′31″W
- Built: 1718
- NRHP reference No.: 73000322

Significant dates
- Added to NRHP: April 11, 1973
- Designated BOSL: May 13, 2025

The Old Corner Bookstore is a historic commercial building at the northwest corner of Washington and School streets in the Downtown Boston section of Boston, Massachusetts, United States. The building consists of four attached structures: the main corner building at 283 Washington Street, and annexes at 277 Washington Street and 5–7 and 11 School Street. The corner structure was built in 1718 as a residence and apothecary shop, becoming a bookstore in 1829. The building is a site on Boston's Freedom Trail, Literary Trail, and Women's Heritage Trail. The Old Corner Bookstore was listed on the National Register of Historic Places in 1973 and listed as a Boston Landmark in 2025.

The site was formerly occupied by the home of Anne Hutchinson, which was built in 1634 and burned down in the Great Boston Fire of 1711. Its owner, Thomas Crease, constructed a new building on the site in 1718 as a residence and apothecary shop. The neighboring Cunningham House at 277 Washington Street initially functioned as a separate structure. The corner building's first use as a bookstore dates to 1829, when Timothy Harrington Carter leased the corner space and built the two annexes on School Street. From 1832 to 1865, it was home to publishing companies led by William Ticknor, including Ticknor and Fields. During this time, it became a meeting place for such authors as Henry Wadsworth Longfellow, Ralph Waldo Emerson, Nathaniel Hawthorne, Charles Dickens, and Oliver Wendell Holmes Sr.

The last bookstore tenant moved out in 1903, after which the building had multiple commercial tenants in the 20th century. The Cunningham House and bookstore properties were consolidated into one building between 1917 and 1922. After the Old Corner Bookstore building was threatened with demolition and replacement in 1959, Historic Boston was formed to save the building, acquiring it in 1960. The Boston Globe newspaper moved into the ground floor in 1964, and several tenants, including the Globe Corner Bookstore and a Globe company store, occupied the building over the years. Since 2011, the ground floor of the corner structure has been occupied by a Chipotle Mexican Grill fast-food restaurant; the other structures have been occupied by various businesses over the years.

== Site ==
The Old Corner Bookstore is situated on the northwest corner of Washington and School streets in Downtown Boston, Massachusetts, United States. The building consists of four attached structures. Its primary structure's address is 283 Washington Street, though the adjacent stretch of Washington Street has been known by multiple names over the years, including Cornhill, Marlborough Street, and Orange Street. The building extends into annexes at 277 Washington Street (originally a home) and 5–7 and 11 School Street (built as annexes to the primary structure).

The bookstore sits at one end of Boston's former Newspaper Row. Just south of the building is a vest pocket park developed by the Boston Five Cents Savings Bank, whose building faces the Old Corner Bookstore. The Old Corner Bookstore is a stop on the Freedom Trail, a path connecting historic sites in Boston. Sequentially, it is between the site of Boston's first public school (originally the Boston Latin School) and the Old South Meeting House. The Old Corner Bookstore is also located on the Literary Trail and the Women's Heritage Trail.

== History ==
The first European settler of the Old Corner site was Isaac Johnson, who was granted the land when the town of Boston was founded in 1630; he died shortly thereafter. It was then occupied by the house of Anne Hutchinson, whose family had built the first house on the site in 1634. Hutchinson was expelled from Massachusetts in 1637 for heresy, and a succession of people owned the site over the next seven decades. The last of these was the family of the merchant Henry Shrimpton, whose daughter Abigail Bourne eventually sold the building to the Old Corner Bookstore's developer Thomas Crease. Crease purchased the Hutchinson home in 1708, and it burned down in the Great Boston Fire on October 2, 1711. This resulted in wood buildings being banned in the area.

=== Early history ===
A new brick building, later to become the Old Corner Bookstore, was built at Washington Street (then Cornhill) after the fire, in 1718. Although sources have given construction dates of 1712 or 1714, the historian Warren S. Tryon retrospectively wrote that the Old Corner Bookstore was described as being built "sometime after 1712", which was sometimes misinterpreted as being built during 1712. A report from the Boston Board of Selectmen in July 1718 indicated that the building was still under construction; in another report that September, the selectmen referred to the building as the place "where he now dwells", in reference to Crease. The Old Corner Bookstore building is one of the oldest brick buildings in Boston and is sometimes cited as being the city's oldest such structure altogether, though the Pierce–Hichborn House is older, having been built in 1711. It is also Boston's oldest commercial building. Over the years, the Old Corner Bookstore and its subsequent tenants have hosted various commercial concerns.

The corner building was initially known as the Thomas Crease House. It was a 2 1/2-story brick edifice with a hip roof. The corner building, originally carrying the address 76 Cornhill, was a residence and apothecary shop; Crease had his store at ground level and lived upstairs. Such an arrangement was commonplace for pharmacists of the time, and several successive residents maintained this configuration. The store was accessed from Washington Street, while the residence was reached through a garden from School Street. In 1728, Andrew Cunningham built a house adjacent to the Crease House. The Cunningham House was physically separated from the other buildings for nearly two centuries. Crease operated his store for years, eventually selling it for 1,200 Massachusetts pounds.

The merchant Herman Brimmer eventually bought the house for 1,600 pounds. The first directory of Boston was published in 1789, at which point the corner building was occupied by Brimmer and the broker John Jackson. In 1795, Cunningham's grandson rented the Cunningham House to John West, a publisher, who became its first commercial tenant. West operated a store on the first floor and converted the upper stories to his own residence. Brimmer continued living in the Crease House until his death in 1800, though that building's shop was taken over by Samuel M. and Minot Thayer from 1798 until 1816. In 1817, Dr. Samuel Clarke, father of future minister James Freeman Clarke, bought the corner building, using it as an apothecary. and residence. After 1822, the Cunningham family lost the deed to their house, which was successively conveyed to several of Andrew Cunningham's female descendants. In 1824, when Cornhill was renamed Washington Street, the corner building's address was changed to 135 Washington Street.

=== Use as bookstore ===
Proprietors
From	Until	Proprietor
1828	1833	Carter & Hendee
1833	1837	Allen & Ticknor
1837	1844	William Ticknor
1844	1865	Ticknor, Reed & Fields
1865	1869	E. P. Dutton & Co
1869	1883	A. Williams & Co.
1883	1893	Cupples, Upham & Co.
1893	1902	Damrell & Upham
1902	1903	Old Corner Bookstore

The corner building's first use as a bookstore dates to 1828, when it was leased by the firm of Carter & Hendee. Afterward, the building was not used as a residence again. Over the years, it hosted publishing companies under eight different names, remaining in operation as a bookstore until 1903. Among the tenants was Ticknor and Fields, which, for part of the 19th century, was one of the most important publishing companies in the United States. The writer Hugh Walker retrospectively said in 1975 that "the bookstore won enduring fame" during the Ticknor era. The Cunningham House was similarly used by publishing companies between 1828 and the 1880s.

==== 1828–1833: Carter & Hendee ====
When Timothy Harrington Carter leased the corner building from George Brimmer in 1828, the adjacent section of Washington Street extending north to the Old State House had been developed into Boston's Newspaper Row. Carter spent $7,000 (Note: Equivalent to $238,000 in 2025) renovating the building's commercial space, including the addition of projecting, small-paned windows on the ground floor. He lowered the ground story slightly to provide easier access Washington Street, requiring the reduction of some space in the cellar, renovated the first floor facade and may have also been responsible for the building's slate roof. Two 3-story buildings were added beside the School Street elevation around the same time, which were developed by Carter on the site of Crease's former garden. Carter also set up a wooden building behind the School Street buildings, with seven printing presses.

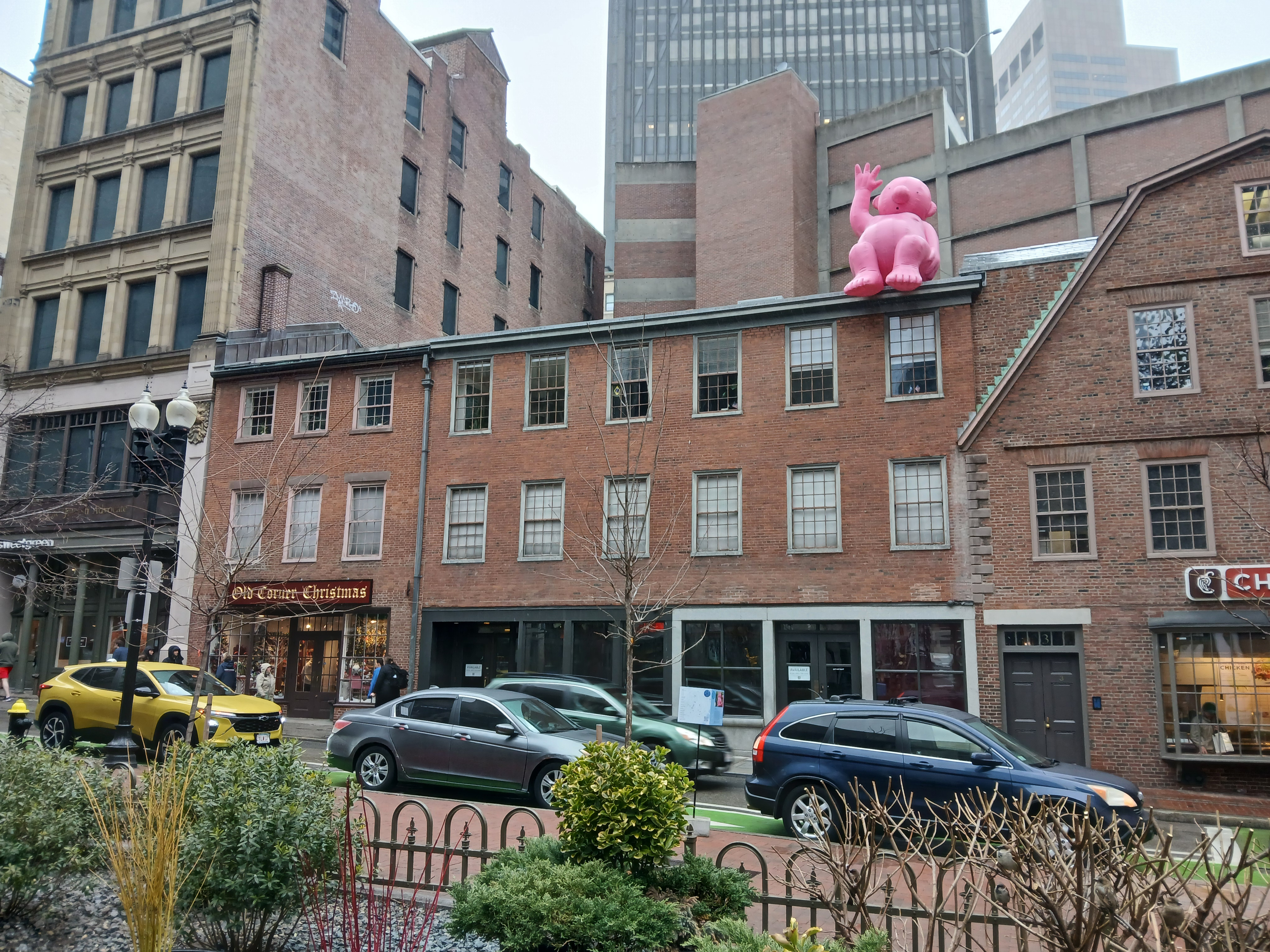
The School Street annexes, which were added in 1828

The store opened in 1829 and was operated by Carter in conjunction with Charles Hendee. The store sold books in multiple European languages, along with stationery and medical literature. Isaac R. Butts opened a printing office in the building after Carter & Hendee's move. Carter & Hendee remained in the store until about 1833, when they moved to 131 Washington Street. One writer retrospectively said in 1893 that Carter & Hendee "published volumes that even at present lie on the top shelves of libraries". Upon Carter's death in 1894, he was held in high regard for his role in founding the Old Corner Bookstore.

==== 1833–1865: William Ticknor and partners ====
In 1832–1833, ownership passed to William Ticknor, whose companies occupied the building for three decades, beginning with Ticknor & Allen. (Note: Sources disagree on whether Ticknor took over in 1832 or 1833. Some sources cite Ticknor as having become the sole proprietor in 1833 after Ticknor & Allen took over the building in 1832.) Ticknor originally operated the store alongside John Allen. By no later than 1837, the store was under Ticknor's sole proprietorship. After 1844, Ticknor operated the building in partnership with John Reed Jr. and James T. Fields, under the name Ticknor, Reed and Fields. Ticknor, Reed and Fields used only the ground floor of the corner structure for a retail space, where it displayed volumes behind glass cases. Ticknor and Fields had offices raised above the rear of the store, and there was a coffeehouse in the annex. Other sections of the building, particularly upstairs rooms and storefronts facing School Street, were in turn sublet to other businesses. The upper story tenants—in addition to Butts—included the bookbinders George Gould and Peter Low, as well as the hairdresser William Dudley.

Sources retrospectively described the Ticknor era as the store's heyday, and the writer David Emblidge said the store had gained "positive literary and intellectual magnetism" during that time. The Old Corner Bookstore became a meeting place for such authors as Henry Wadsworth Longfellow, Ralph Waldo Emerson, Nathaniel Hawthorne, Charles Dickens, and Oliver Wendell Holmes Sr. Fields's confidant, the journalist Edwin Percy Whipple, also frequented the building. The Boston Daily Globe retrospectively wrote that the store was frequently a place "to gather and exchange greetings and ideas"; one room, sitting room no. 2, was particularly well known as a space where authors traded witty comments. The building's coffeehouse was a common gathering spot as well, but Fields hosted larger, more formal events at the nearby Parker House. The building's popularity was attributed in part to Fields's intuition for visitors' tastes; he reportedly was able to correctly guess what visitors were looking for when they came into the store. Figures such as Hawthorne, Rufus Choate, Henry Ward Beecher, and Louis Agassiz would visit Fields's small office for casual talks. Non-literary figures such as the actresses Charlotte Cushman and Fanny Kemble and the violinist Ole Bull also visited.

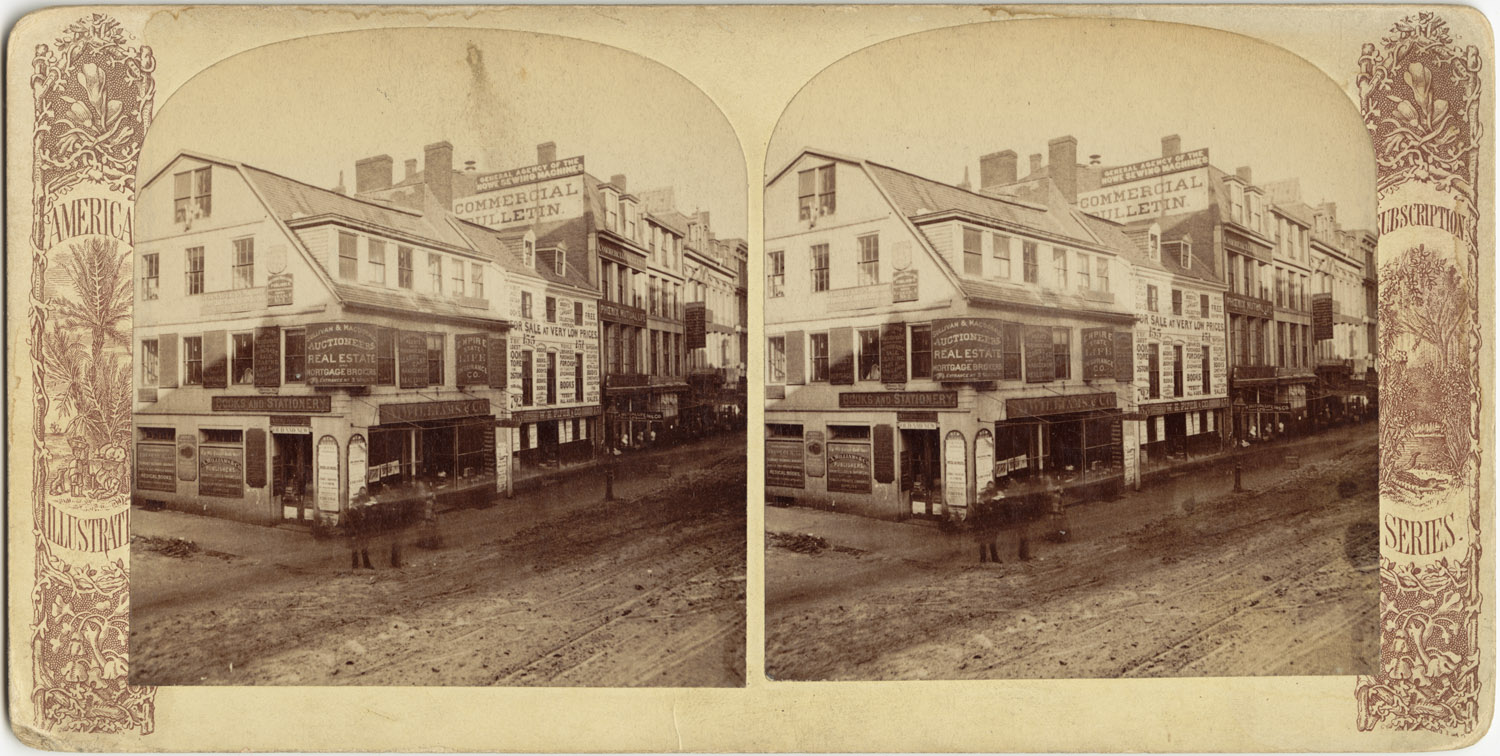
Corner Bookstore building, 19th century

The business published the works of many authors who frequented the building, offering authors royalties to obtain their manuscripts. These included British authors such as Matthew Arnold, Elizabeth Barrett Browning, Thomas De Quincey, Charles Dickens, Leigh Hunt, Alfred Tennyson, and William Makepeace Thackeray. At the building, Ticknor & Fields published works from New England authors as well, such as Hawthorne, Emerson, Louisa May Alcott, Julia Ward Howe, Harriet Beecher Stowe, and Henry David Thoreau, and of other Americans, such as James Russell Lowell, John Greenleaf Whittier, Holmes, and Longfellow. The Atlantic Monthly, founded 1857, published its first editions in one of the building's back rooms; the Atlantic's founders had frequently attended discussions at the store. The building was so small that some of The Atlantic Monthly's first issues had to be stored outside on School Street. Volumes were also stored in the cellar and attic.

Emblidge retrospectively described the bookstore as having been "in the right place at the right time", having gained popularity when Boston's literary scene was growing. The presence of the nearby Boston Mercantile Library also attracted many literary figures whom Fields had been able to befriend, contributing to the store's popularity. None of the upper-story lessees remained by 1860, though Edward K. Perry, a paint manufacturer, moved into the corner building's third-floor loft in 1861.

==== 1865–1903: Successive bookstores ====
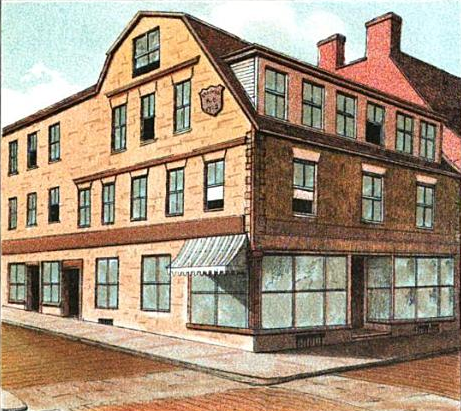
1889 depiction of the store

By Ticknor's death in 1864, the store had outgrown the building. In 1865, Ticknor and Fields moved to Tremont Street. A succession of publishing houses and booksellers followed Ticknor & Fields in the building. First among them was E. P. Dutton, which had acquired the Old Corner Bookstore's retail space in November 1864; the store's namesake, Edward Payson Dutton, invited Ticknor & Fields's leading salesman Charles A. Clapp to join him as a partner in the business. E. P. Dutton stayed there until 1869, after which it moved to 124 Tremont Street. Afterward, the Old Corner Bookstore was occupied by A. Williams & Co., which began using the building for book sales rather than merely as a publishing hub. Local women frequented the store for "works of devotion, prayer books, hymnals and Bibles". In 1875, the corner building was given its current address, 283 Washington Street, after the street was extended.

A. Williams was succeeded in 1883 by Cupples, Upham & Co., which by 1890 was known as JG Cupples Company; the firm ceased to exist in 1893. Cupples transferred operation of the corner building's bookstore in 1887 to Damrell and Upham. A writer in the late 1890s said that writers such as Fields's wife, along with writers such as Sarah Orne Jewett, Edward Everett Hale, Mary Eleanor Wilkins Freeman, Elizabeth Stuart Phelps Ward, Herbert Dickinson Ward, Margaret Deland, Louise Chandler Moulton, Alice Brown, and Louise Imogen Guiney frequented the store. There was a magazine counter that attracted significant numbers of clients, and there was a section in the rear for Episcopal Church literature. Through the 1890s, the building was owned by the Brimmer family. Several proposals were made to redevelop the site in the late 19th century, none of which came to fruition.

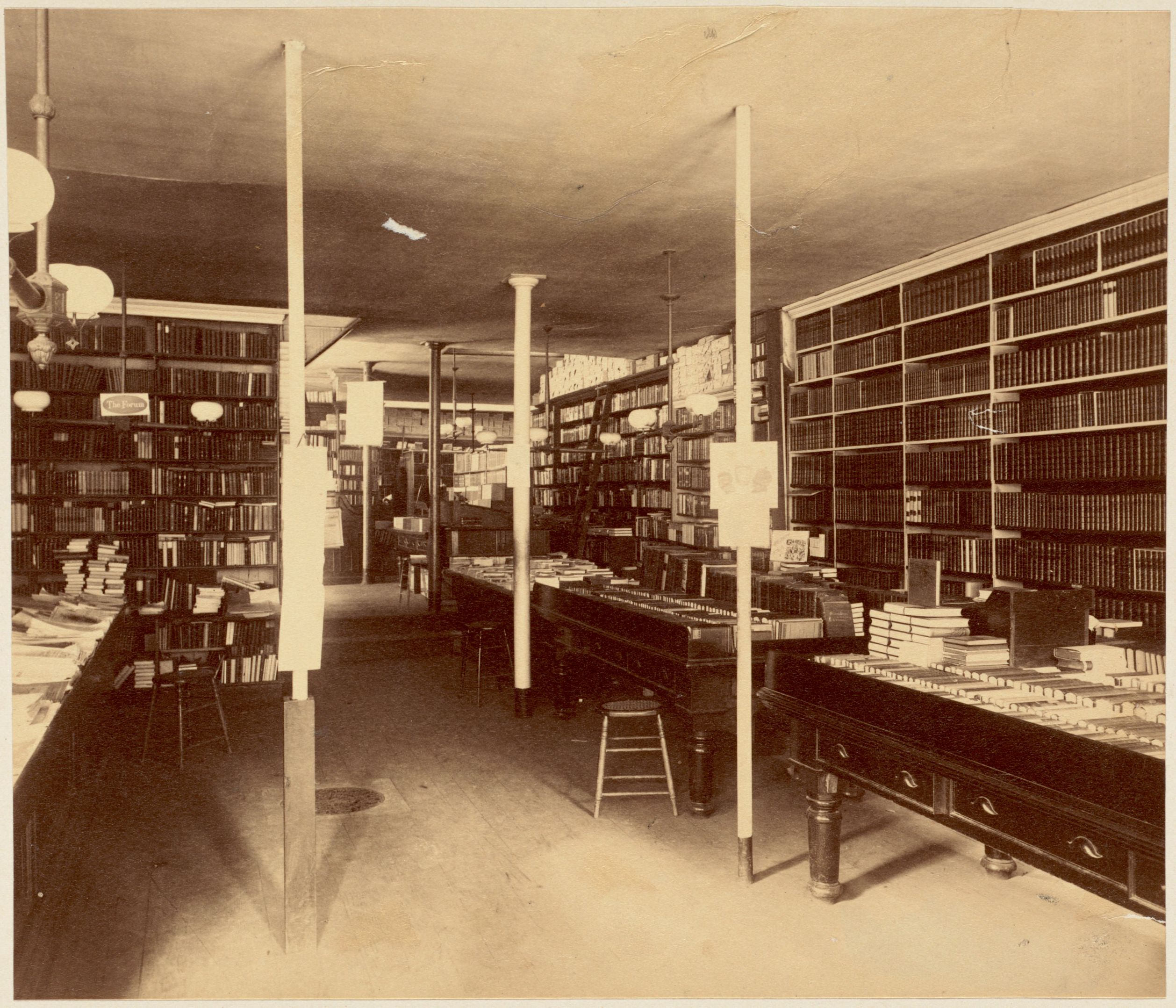
An 1891 view of the interior

Charles Lowe Damrell, who along with Henry Macy Upham was one of the bookstore's proprietors, died in 1896, after which Upham alone operated the store. In 1898, John Inches obtained an ownership interest in the corner building and the two School Street annexes. At the time, the sites were valued at $347,000. (Note: Equivalent to $11,447,000 in 2025) Inches also did not plan to redevelop the site at the time. The neighboring Cunningham House was sold in 1899 to the Washington Street Trust. The new owners announced plans to replace the Cunningham House with a high-rise office building, at which point the house's occupants included a furnishing company, shoe dealer, tailor, ticket agent, and insecticide firm. In 1901, Inches expanded his ownership stake in the corner building and the School Street structures from the Sturgis estate; at the time, Inches was planning a new building there.

Meanwhile, Upham partnered with George Alexander Moore in 1899; Upham retired as the bookstore's operator in 1902, with Moore continuing as the sole partner in the business. The business was formally renamed the "Old Corner Bookstore", although that name was already used informally. The business moved out of the building in July 1903, after the expiration of its lease, marking the end of the Old Corner Bookstore building's time as a full-time bookstore. The Washington Post wrote that the building was "still the favorite haunt of the author and the reader", and The New York Times wrote that the Old Corner Bookstore was a "pleasant lounge" for bibliophiles but that the name held little significance to younger generations.

=== Repurposing and preservation ===
After the departure of the final bookseller, the corner building had multiple commercial tenants in the 20th century. The actual bookstore no longer occupied a street corner after a further relocation in 1924, though the business remained in operation under the Old Corner name until 1979. The Herald News wrote in 1960 that "the toboggan-slide from fame began" after the bookstore moved away. From 1901 to the 1920s, the ground floor of the corner building hosted Baltimore Dairy Lunch.

==== Mid-1900s to late 1950s ====
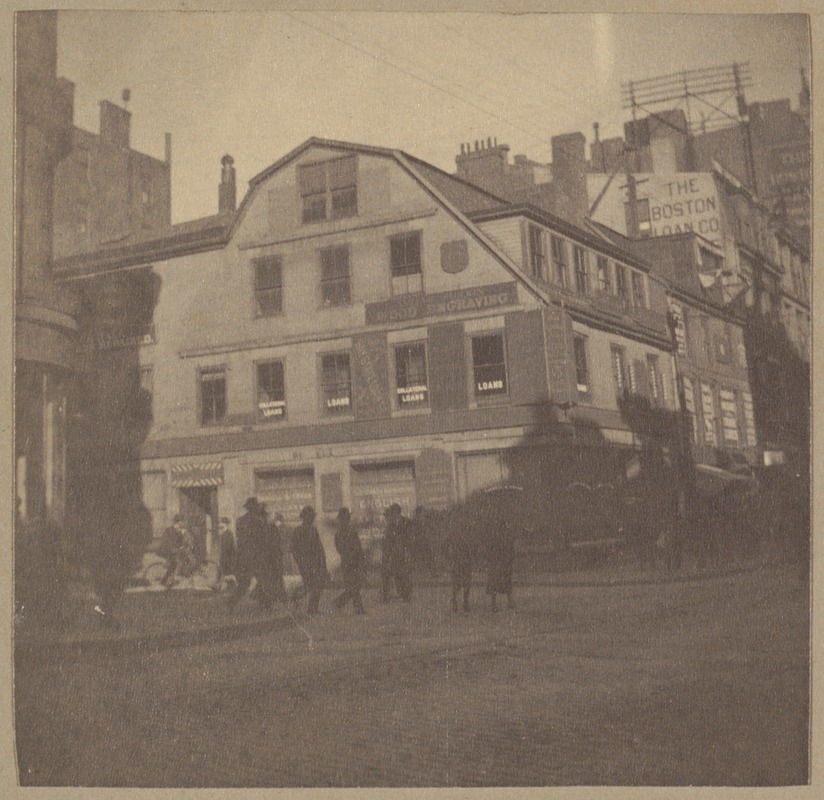
The store building at the turn of the 20th century (c. 1895–1905)

The roof of the corner building was damaged by a fire in December 1903. The Wyzanski Trust acquired the Inches family's interest in the property in December 1905. The following March, the United Merchants Realty and Improvement Company leased the corner building's space, and the Wyzanski trust resold the building to the Welch family, which gifted the property to the Museum of Fine Arts, Boston (MFA Boston), in July 1906. MFA Boston resold the property back to the Inches estate in 1909. Meanwhile, a succession of literary merchants and publishers had occupied the Cunningham House at 277 Washington Street over the years; by 1910, the building was owned by William C. Coggswell and had two stores at ground level and offices above. The Cunningham House was leased that year to William H. Sullivan, who planned to open a tailor shop there.

Between 1917 and 1922, the Cunningham House, the corner building, and the bookstore annexes were combined into a single property. The corner building was slightly damaged in a 1918 fire, at which point an advertising novelties store occupied the ground floor. Literary tenants still used the corner building, while the Cunningham House's ground story hosted clothing stores. By the early 1920s, the facade was covered in signage. The only evidence of its prior use was a plaque above a door on School Street. A men's clothing store had moved into the corner building's ground floor by that decade. By the 1930s and 1940s, tenants included United Cigar Stores on the first floor of the corner building, Lawrence's Tavern at 11 School Street's ground level, and the Rosen Talking Machine Company on the School Street buildings' upper floors. The corner building was damaged by fire again in 1935 and in 1936. The building's tenants by then included merchants, a barbershop, a shoe repairer, and a restaurant. The building itself was nondescript and was valued at only $7,000, (Note: Equivalent to $128,000 in 2025) one percent of the land valuation. (Note: The land was valued at $700,000, equivalent to $12,752,000 in 2025.)

Katherine Ladd bought all four portions of the property—the corner structure, the Cunningham House, and the School Street structures—from the Inches family in 1946. The writer N. P. Willis said that the building had remained relatively unchanged over the years, other than the installation of bow windows on the facade. By the 1950s, Lawrence's Tavern still occupied 11 School Street. A pizza shop occupied the corner building, staying there until about 1963. In 1956, the developer Elliot Henderson acquired the property.

==== 1959–1963: Proposed demolition and preservation ====
The developer Samuel P. Coffman had obtained several neighboring sites by 1959; that March, he announced plans to purchase the Old Corner Bookstore property to make way for a motel. One of the adjacent sites, a former headquarters for The Boston Post, was subsequently demolished and replaced with a parking lot. After reading about plans for the motel in The Boston Globe, local architect Francis N. Cummings Jr. proposed converting the Old Corner Bookstore into a museum. Meanwhile, Franklin G. Floete, director of the General Services Administration (GSA), had rejected two parcels in the Government Center redevelopment project for a new Boston federal building. The federal government obtained a plot of land on Washington Street from the city in August 1959 as part of a land swap. This would have entailed the demolition of the Old Corner Bookstore building. Local business groups expressed opposition to the federal government's takeover of the site on Washington Street. The next month, a state judge issued an injunction preventing the federal acquisition of the Washington Street site. There were also proposals to replace the building with a parking garage.

Amid the building's proposed demolition, Mayor John F. Collins and Deputy Mayor John P. McMorrow sought to preserve it. The federal government was also interested in protecting the Old Corner Bookstore as an official landmark. With Collins's encouragement, preservationists formed the organization Old Corner Committee, which in October 1960 began raising $250,000 (Note: Equivalent to $2,082,000 in 2025) to buy the building from Henderson and restore the exterior to its 19th-century appearance. By then, there was a pizzeria, cafeteria, and tailor in the building. The committee's chairman Walter Muir Whitehill and secretary John Codman sought to raise an initial $50,000. (Note: Equivalent to $416,000 in 2025) The committee obtained an option to buy the building, which was to expire on January 1, 1961. Donors, who included mothers, drug-store employees, and high school students, contributed between $0.10 and over $1,000 each. (Note: Equivalent to $0.83–8,000 in 2025) Two Boston City Council members criticized the effort as "absurd and farfetched". The committee exercised their option in early December 1960 after raising $30,000. (Note: Equivalent to $250,000 in 2025) The purchase was finalized on December 30, 1960, after $50,000 had been raised for the down payment. The building's $275,000 total cost had yet to be raised. (Note: Equivalent to $2,290,000 in 2025) Historic Boston Inc., led by Whitehill, was created to take over ownership of the building. They ultimately raised the requisite $275,000, which paid for both the corner building and the Cunningham House.

The federal Boston Historic Sites Commission recommended in early 1961 that the federal government take over the Old Corner Bookstore as part of a national monument that would also include other sites such as Faneuil Hall, the Paul Revere House, Old North Church, and Bunker Hill Monument. By later that year, Historic Boston had removed some of the signate and was planning to restore the building's exterior, including windows, dormers, and brickwork. Although the exterior had survived (albeit in poor condition), none of the historical interior spaces remained intact. Whitehill wrote that "it would be pointless and extravagant to consider restoring the Old Corner Bookstore building as a dwelling house" but that he still hoped it could be rented to tenants, saying a renovation would help in that regard. After The Boston Globe agreed to move into the corner building's ground floor in 1963, Historic Boston announced plans to renovate the building. Cummings designed the Globe's offices. Samuel Narcus, a stationery purveyor, moved into the Cunningham House. Rent revenue from the Globe's offices helped pay off the building's mortgage.

==== 1964–1997: Boston Globe offices, bookstore revival ====
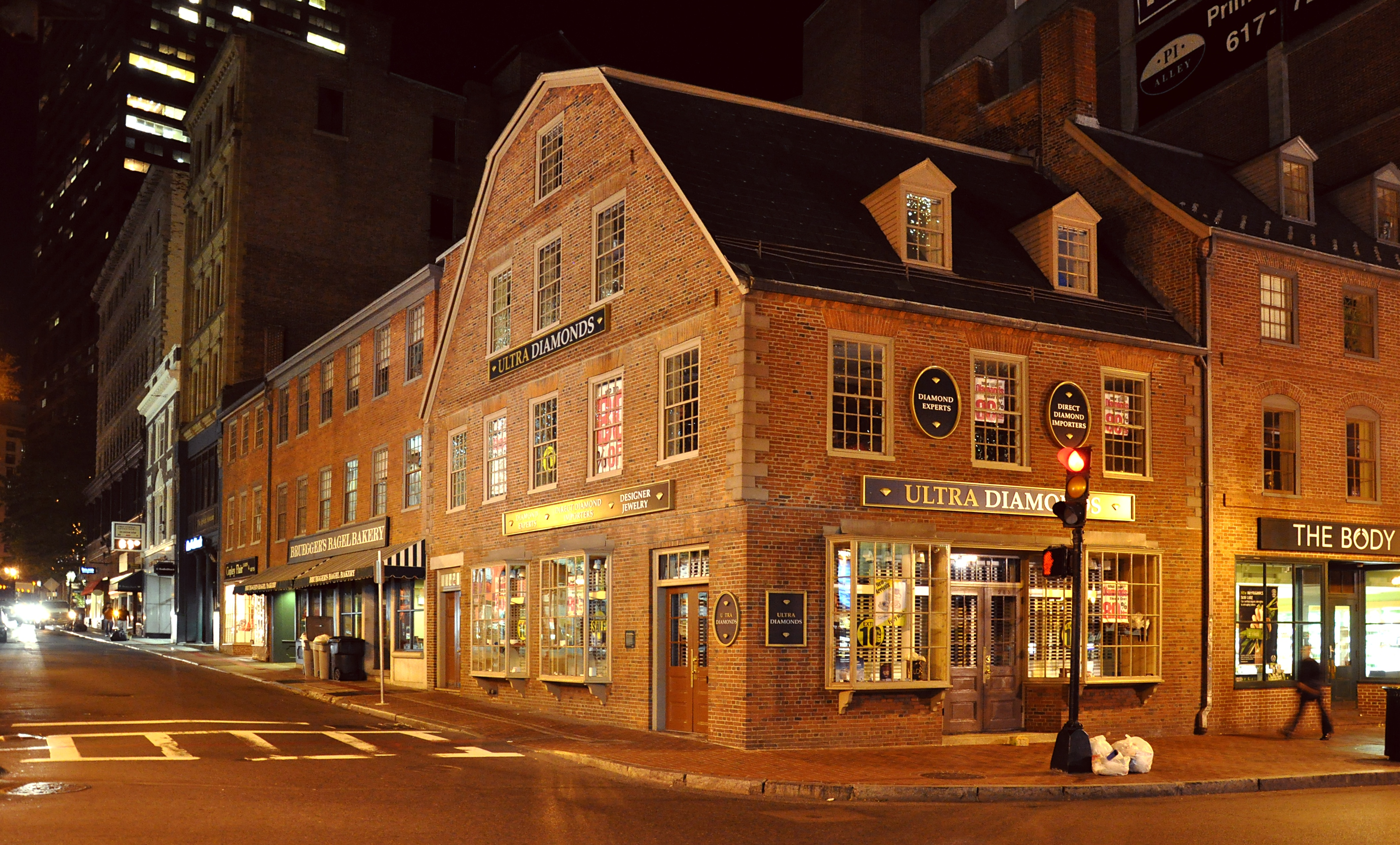
The store seen at night in 2009

The Globe moved into the building in May 1964, and Whitehill began a fundraising drive for the building that month. Restoration work continued throughout the decade. The renovation was overseen largely by Cummings and Codman, the latter of whom served as Historic Boston's real estate agent. The Old Corner Bookstore's restoration was one of several renovation projects that took place in the immediate vicinity in the 1960s. By renovating the building, Whitehill had wanted to demonstrate that it could still be used for commercial purposes. The work included removing protruding metalwork, adding steel girders, cleaning and repairing the brick facade, adding electric panels, and replacing fire egress stairs and fire escapes. Also, restoration workers added replica windows and rebuilt the roof dormers on the Washington Street side. As part of a late-1960s plan to redevelop the surrounding neighborhood, the Boston Redevelopment Authority (BRA) proposed converting the adjoining portion of Washington Street into a pedestrian mall and creating a "parklike setting" outside the building.

The Liberty Bank & Trust Co.—which was forced to relocate from its original building just south of the Old Corner Bookstore, which was to be replaced by a plaza as part of the BRA program—signed a lease for space in the corner building in 1968. Liberty Bank agreed to help fund the School Street structures' exterior renovation as part of its lease, and the Liberty Bank branch opened at 7 School Street in 1969. Other offices occupied the rest of the building, and rental income from these offices was used to help pay off the building's mortgage. Codman received an award from the Boston Society of Architects in 1971 for his role in restoring the Old Corner Bookstore building, The Cunningham House's facade was restored in the 1970s prior to the 1976 United States Bicentennial. By the late 1970s, the building hosted advertising and circulation departments of the Globe; the newspaper sold classified advertisements from there. Globe Pequot Press also had offices there when it was owned by the Globe. Oliver Wendell Holmes's desk was still visible inside. The building was closed on weekends, and one guidebook wrote that the Old Corner Bookstore was difficult for disabled visitors to access because of steps, narrow doors, and missing handrails. Historic Boston had earned sufficient rental income from the Old Corner Bookstore that it was able to purchase other structures for preservation.

The corner building's retail space was occupied by the Globe Corner Bookstore starting in 1982. The bookstore sold travel literature along with items about New England. The neighboring Cunningham House space was occupied by cosmetics retailer The Body Shop after Narcus moved out in the 1980s, then a frozen yogurt store. The chimneys atop the Washington Street structures were rebuilt in 1984, and the roofs of the School Street structures were repaired in the early 1990s. The storefronts of 5–7 School Street were rebuilt in 1996 to create the impression of two distinct buildings, as they had been in the mid-19th century. Patrick and Harriet Carter operated the Globe Corner Bookstore for more than a decade. The Globe divested itself of the bookstore in 1989. By the 1990s, the Globe Corner Bookstore was facing competition from larger literary retailers including Barnes & Noble and Borders Books, and overhead costs were increasing along with retail vacancies nearby. The Globe Corner Bookstore moved out of the Old Corner Bookstore building in 1997, citing high costs. At the time, literary agent Charles B. Everitt (formerly of Globe Pequot) occupied one of the upper-floor offices.

==== 1998–present ====
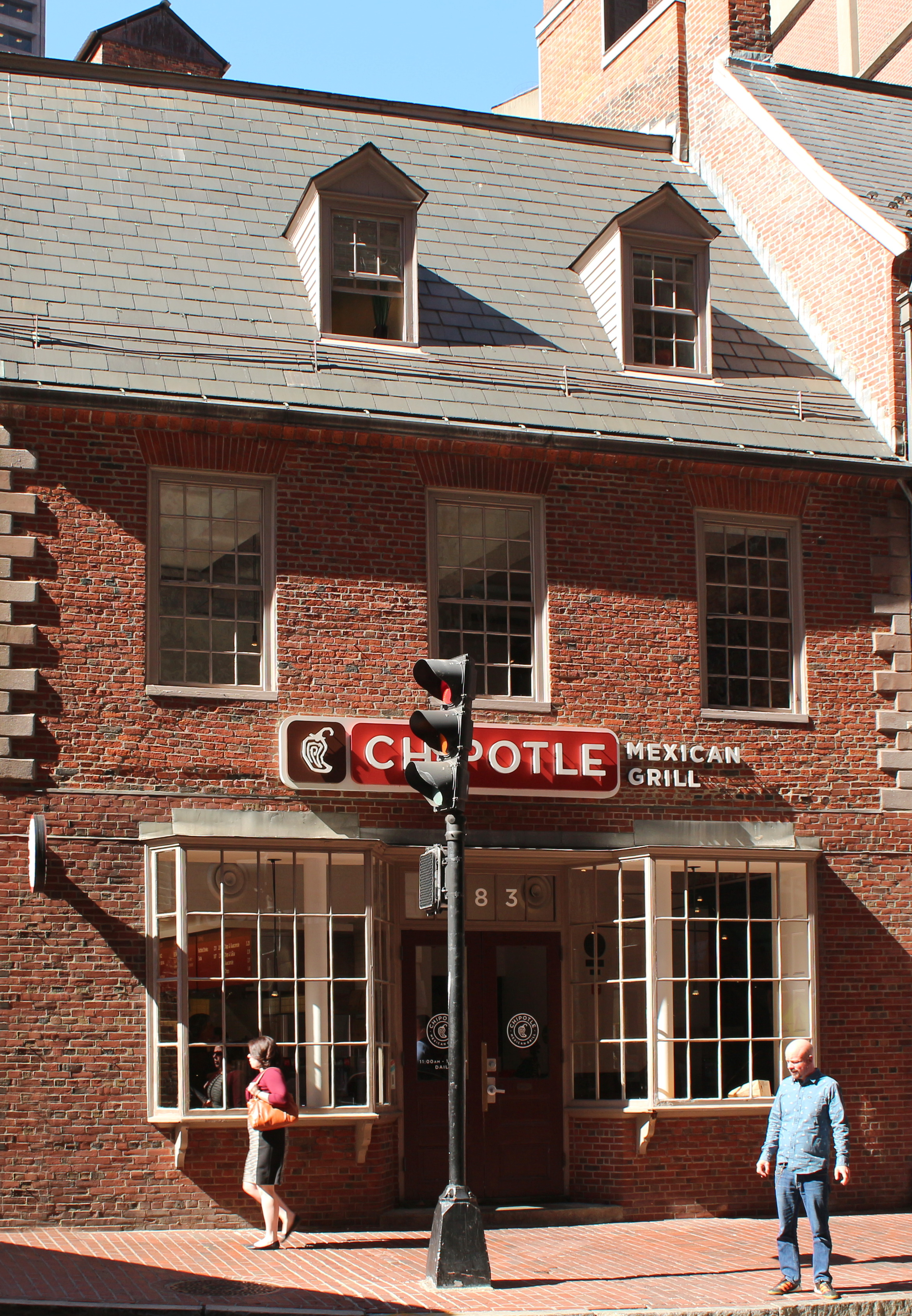
In 2011, the building became a Chipotle Mexican Grill.

After the Globe Corner Bookstore moved out, the Boston Globe moved back in that year, opening a souvenir store along with an internet cafe with computer stations. A historic structure report for the building was created in 1999. Historic Boston agreed to a five-year preservation restriction in exchange for a state grant for the historic structure report. The corner building was open seven days a week by the early 2000s, and the Boston Globe company store closed in 2002. Historic Boston considered and rejected several proposals to reuse the building before it accepted the bid of a jewelry chain, Ultra Diamonds, which moved into the corner store in 2005, at which point another portion of the building was occupied by a bagel shop. Ultra Diamonds renovated the interior and added explanatory plaques about the building's history.

In 2011, Chipotle Mexican Grill leased the corner structure's ground-floor space for use as a fast-food restaurant, initially for a ten-year period. Chipotle subsequently spent $130,000 on renovations. The restaurant chain Dig Inn signed a lease for another storefront at the Old Corner Bookstore in 2016; it also renovated the interior. By 2017, Historic Boston was planning ways to increase public awareness of the building, which often went unnoticed by tourists due to a lack of prominent signage. That year, Historic Boston added an augmented reality display to the corner building as part of an initiative to teach visitors about the building's history. Chipotle's continued presence prompted several thousand people to sign a petition in 2018, calling for Chipotle's removal when the lease expired. One signatory of the petition said, "The Chipotle disappoints pedestrians who know what happened there and fails to inform those who don't." Historic Boston stated that Chipotle's lease payments helped pay for the organization's other programs. Further repairs to the building took place in 2022.

== Architecture ==
The bookstore complex consists of four structures. An account from 1896 wrote that the School Street structures and the corner buildings had different floor levels because the topography sloped upward as School Street traveled west, away from Washington Street.

=== Main building ===
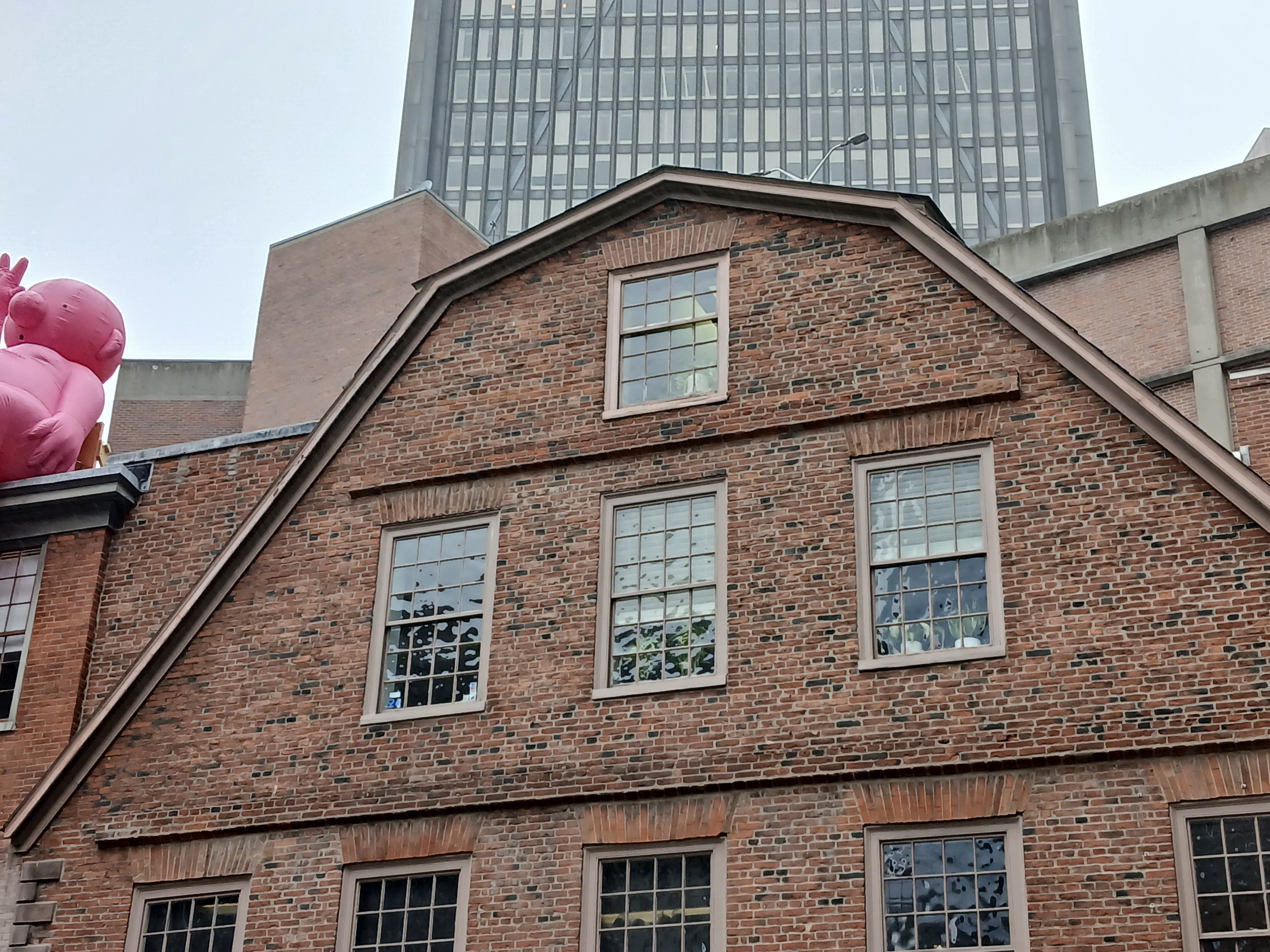
Detail of the gambrel roof

The main building at 283 Washington Street, built in 1718, is 3 1/2 stories high. A contemporary New York Times account from 1896 described the main building's architecture as resembling Dutch architecture; since the 1960s, the building has largely retained its mid-19th-century appearance. The facade is made of brick atop a thick foundation made of granite, and is arranged so that, in one out of every four horizontal courses, the brickwork is laid on the bricks' header sides rather than their stretcher sides. On the School Street elevation of the facade, brick string courses clearly delineate the building's stories. On the second story, there are quoins at the building's corners, which are made of Connecticut brownstone.

The Washington Street elevation to the east is divided vertically into three bays, while the School Street elevation to the south is divided into five bays. At ground level, on Washington Street, there are two bay windows flanking a central recessed entrance containing a double door and a transom window above. On School Street, there are two double doors with transom windows above, which flank two bay windows; the western bay's double door has a stone lintel. On both elevations, the second story has windows in a 12-over-12 configuration, which have splayed jack arch lintels above them. Three windows in the third story of the School Street elevation are arranged in a 12-over-12 configuration as well, and a single window in an 8-over-12 configuration is placed in the attic on School Street.

The building has a gambrel roof with two sloping sides; the roof is oriented so that the slopes of the roof are visible from School Street. The western section of the School Street elevation has a triangular brick addition, the top of which is at the same level as the roofline of the neighboring 5–7 School Street. On the Washington Street elevation, two dormer windows, with panes in a 6-over-6 configuration, protrude from the roof.

=== Other structures ===
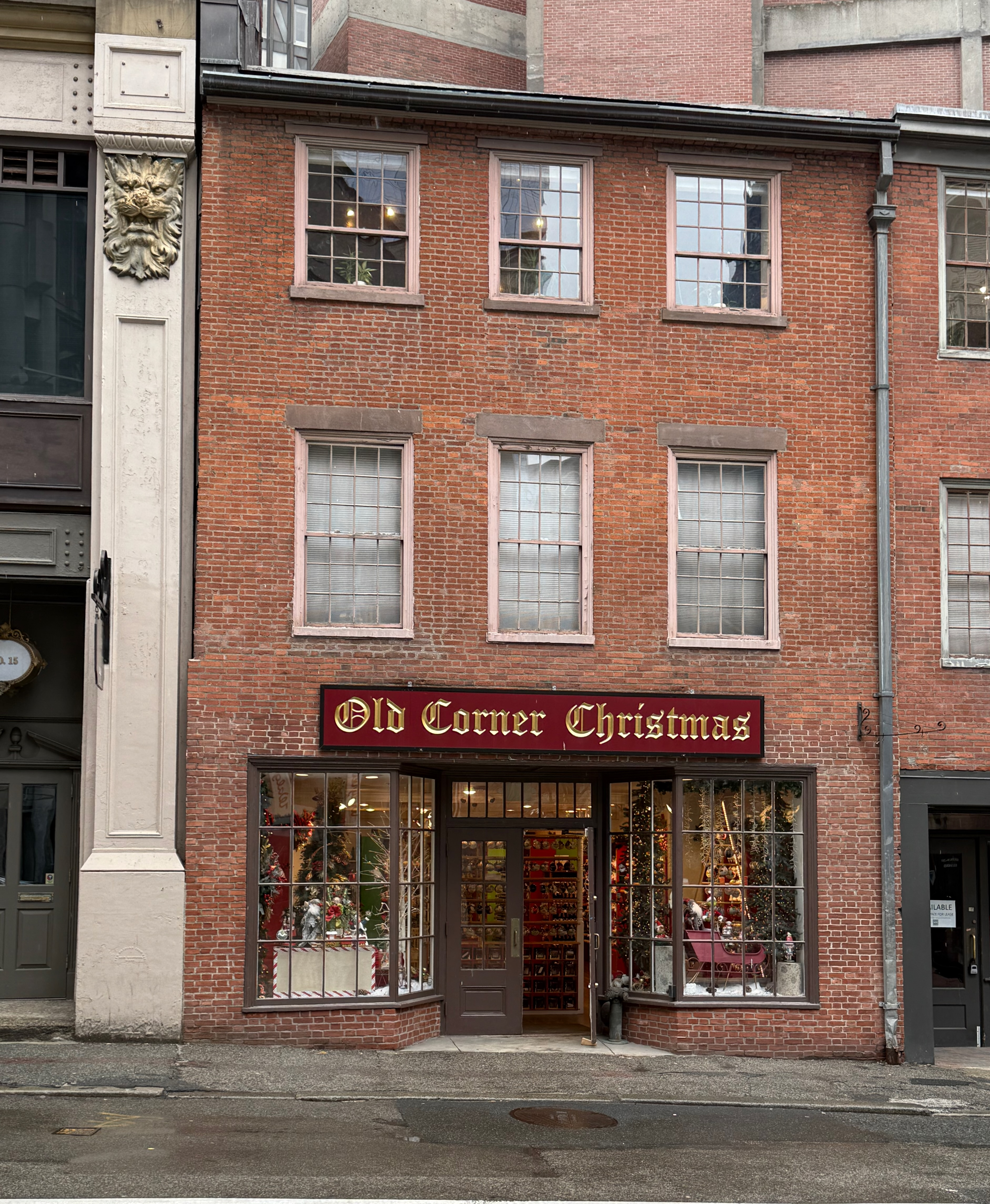
Today's 11 School Street was one of the two additions to the original building around 1828.

277 Washington Street is 3 1/2 stories high and divided into three vertical bays, the northernmost of which is spaced slightly farther apart than the other two. The walls are made of brick laid in Flemish bond, and there are brick string courses delineating each story. The first floor has large windows on either side of a storefront with louvers atop it. The second story has sash windows within round arches; the third floor also has sash windows, which are smaller than the ones on the story below. The sloping roof is made of slate and contains protruding dormers, with sash windows that are yet again smaller than the ones on the story below. All the upper-story windows at 277 Washington Street are arranged in a 6-over-6 configuration.

The buildings on School Street are all three stories high. At 5–7 School Street, the facade stretches across six bays, and at 11 School Street, the facade is three bays wide. The walls are made of brick, laid in common bond at 5–7 School Street and in Flemish bond at 11 School Street. At ground level, the westernmost storefront at 11 School Street has recessed double doors between large windows; the central storefront at 7 School Street contains a recessed door to the west of four large windows; and the eastern storefront at 5 School Street has a granite post and lintel structure with wooden double doors. The second and third stories have windows arranged in a 12-over-12 configuration; the windows on 11 School Street have stone lintels above them. The flat roof at 5–7 School Street has a rubber membrane, and the roof at 11 School Street has a timber frame and slate shingles. Behind the School Street buildings, a three-story wooden structure originally housed printing presses; the first story has since been rebuilt in brick, while the second and third stories were rebuilt in concrete masonry units around 1967.

== Impact and legacy ==
At the height of the bookstore's popularity, Home Journal magazine claimed that "all Boston may be said to pass through the Old Corner Bookstore in a day". Due to the Old Corner Bookstore's reputation as a gathering place for literary notables, the neighboring street corner became known as "Parnassus Corner", a reference to Mount Parnassus being a mythical ancient Greek meeting site. George William Curtis referred to the store as "the hub of the Hub", referring to Boston's nickname, and said that it "compelled the world to acknowledge that there was an American literature". In 1880, one publication wrote that the main structure's features, including the gambrel roof and dormer windows "give it a marked appearance in contrast with its modern neighbors". Another writer in 1885 said that the building was "one of the most eligible sites for a publishing or book-selling firm in the city", which satiated the "literary appetite" of most visitors.

Late-19th and early-20th-century sources described the building as quaint. The Detroit Free Press called it "one of Boston's noted landmarks", and The Critic magazine wrote in 1903 that the structure was "a literary haunt hardly surpassed in this country". By the 1920s, The Christian Science Monitor wrote that the "diminutive brick building now almost hidden by dull signs" belied its role in mid-19th-century Boston's literary history, while The Bookman said the building "resembles some commodious dwelling of the colonial period". Another commentator in 1936 regarded the corner building as "a rather sad sight", with multiple businesses, and the bookstore as "less interesting" than it was when it was housed at 283 Washington Street.

When the building's preservation movement began in 1960, one source described it as a "squat, grimy little building" covered by advertising. The Boston Evening Globe wrote that the building "stirs memories of pen and not of sword". Whitehill recalled in the 1970s that the building "fell on evil days" in the 20th century prior to its 1960s renovation. Architectural writers Robert Campbell and Peter Vanderwarker wrote in 1987 that the Old Corner Bookstore, including the Cunningham House, was overshadowed by an adjacent parking garage that made them "look too small, like stage-sets or dollhouses". During that decade, a writer for the Los Angeles Times described the building as "both old and new", citing the juxtaposition of the 1820s exterior and the renovated interior. In 2001, the Globe wrote that the building's "varied uses offer a unique window on the history of Boston's commerce and culture".

The Old Corner Bookstore was designated a Massachusetts Register of Historic Places site in 1970. The building is listed on the National Register of Historic Places, having been granted that designation in 1973. The structure is just outside the bounds of the Boston National Historical Park, which includes the adjacent Old South Meeting House; when the park was established by act of Congress in 1974, the legislation had recommended studying the possibility of the building's inclusion in the park. The Boston Landmarks Commission, which considered designating the building complex as a Boston Landmark in the early 2010s, granted that designation in May 2025. An exhibit about the Old Corner Bookstore's history was shown at the Old State House in 1960.

== Gallery ==
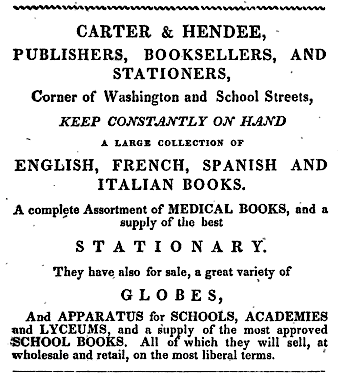
Advertisement for Carter & Hendee, 1832

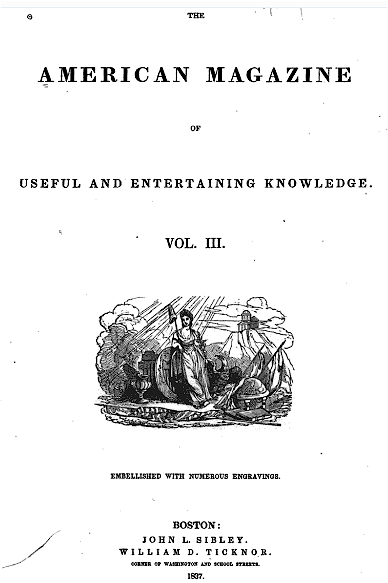
American Magazine of Useful and Entertaining Knowledge, volume 3, 1837 (published by John L. Sibley, William D. Ticknor)

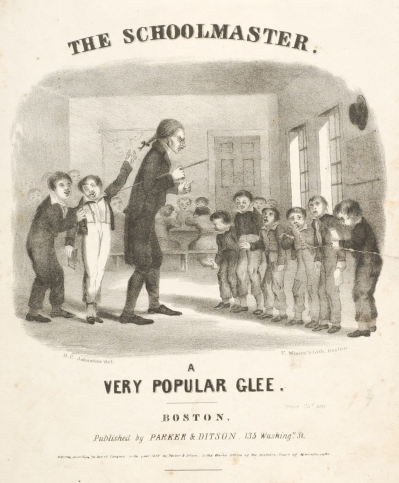
Sheet music, published by Parker & Ditson, 1839 (illustrated by David Claypoole Johnston)

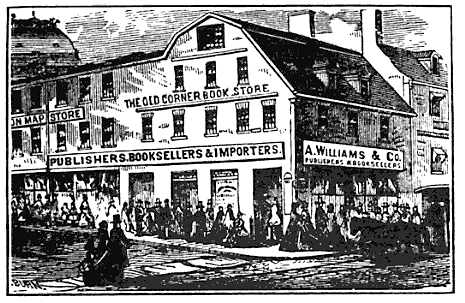
A. Williams & Co., 19th century

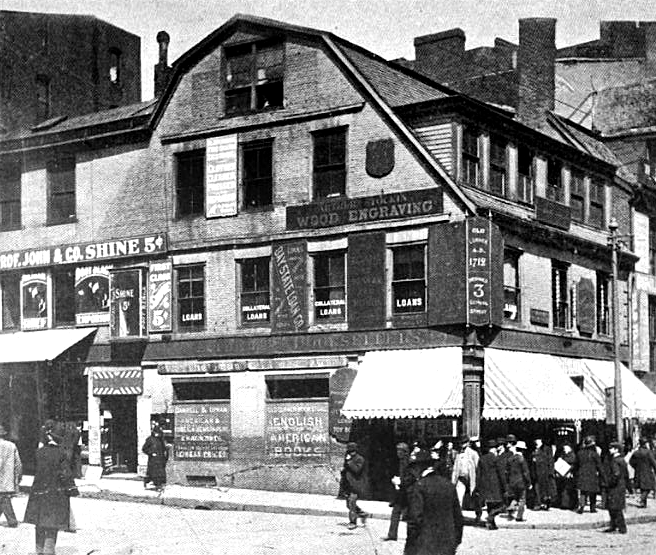
c. 1904

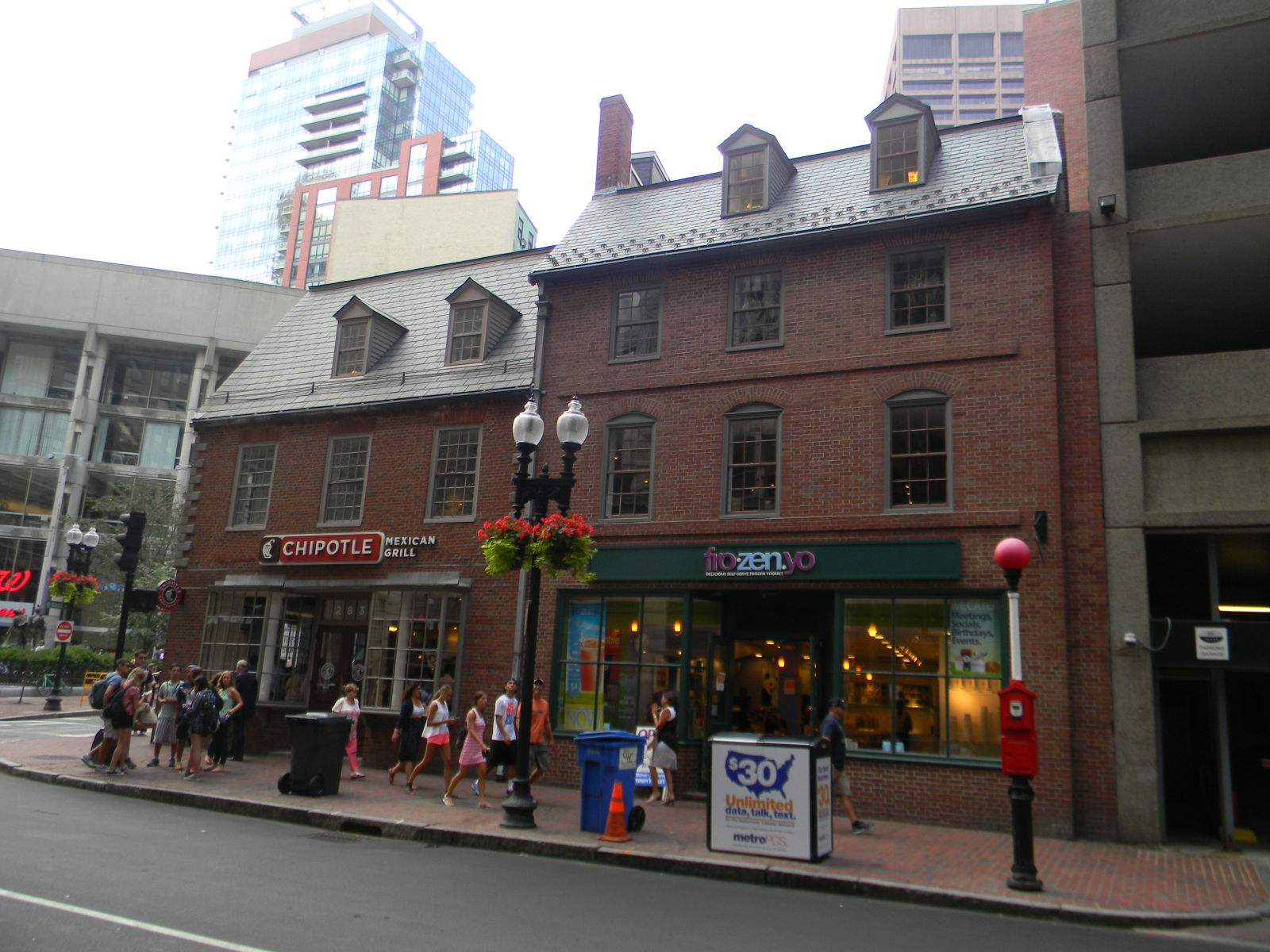
2015

== See also ==
- National Register of Historic Places listings in northern Boston, Massachusetts
- List of Boston Landmarks

Preceded by Site of the first public school, Boston Latin School	Locations along Boston's Freedom Trail; Old Corner Bookstore	Succeeded by Old South Meeting House
