= Globe Corner Bookstore =

Bookstore in Massachusetts, US (1982–2011)

Coordinates: 42°22′20.5″N 71°7′11.5″W

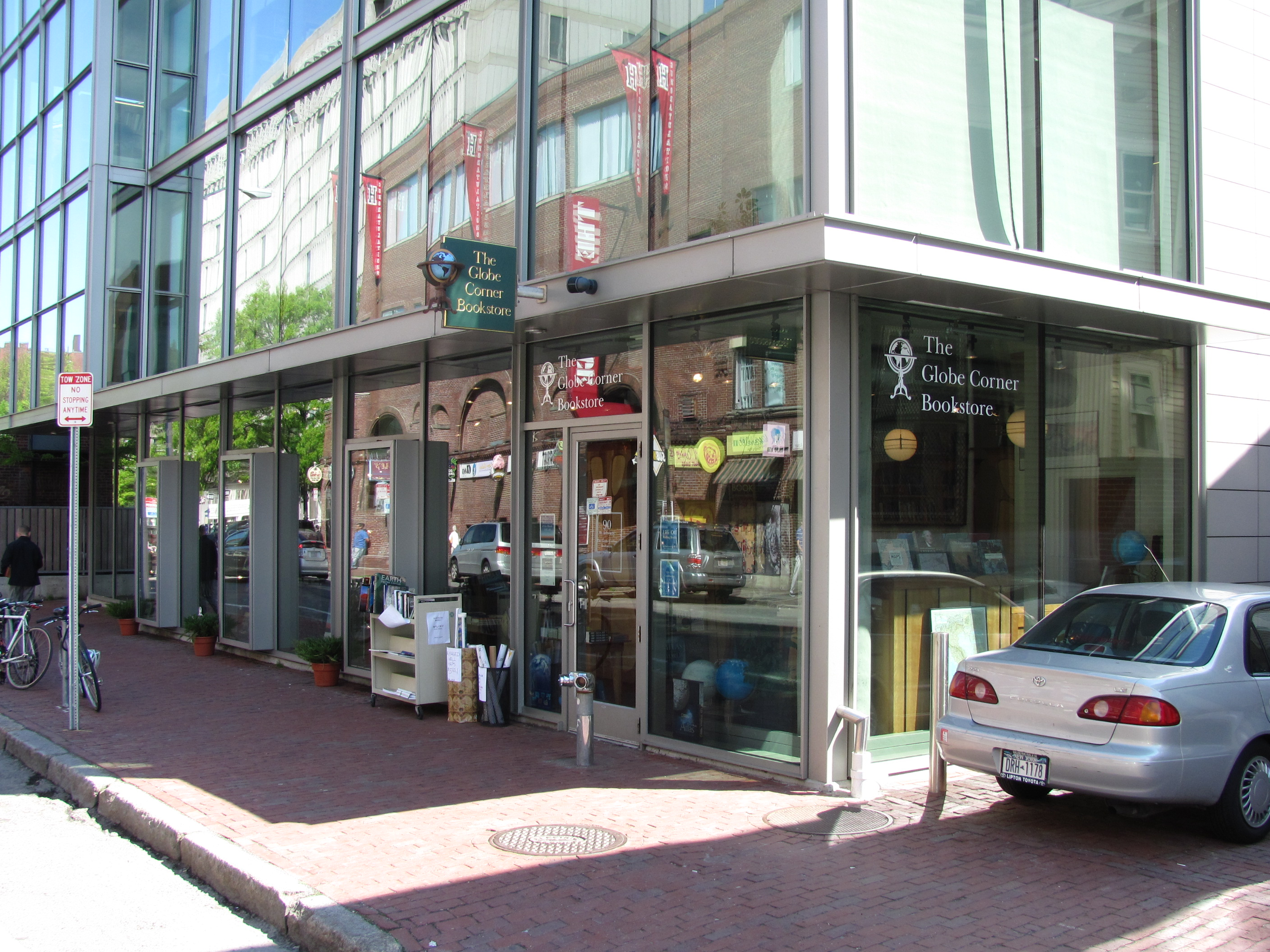
Globe Corner Bookstore, 1988-2011 Cambridge, Massachusetts site

The Globe Corner Bookstore was one of the largest travel book and map retailers in North America. It was located at 90 Mount Auburn Street in Cambridge, Massachusetts, near Harvard Square. The store provided a full range of travel and outdoor recreation reference materials for a destination: guidebooks, maps, atlases, recreation guides, travel literature, nature guides, photography books, cookbooks, and language products.

The company's original store, founded by Patrick Carrier, opened in 1982 in the historic Old Corner Bookstore building in downtown Boston, a continuation of the Old Corner Bookstore rebranded to focus on travel products. Reflecting the shifting dynamics of Boston's retail districts, the company opened its Harvard Square store in 1988 and a location in Boston's Back Bay in 1993.

The store launched its web site in the winter of 1995, the first comprehensive travel book site on the web. In 2007, it had over 100,000 pages.

The Globe Corner Bookstore's Adventure Travel Lecture Series hosted Jan Morris, Bradford Washburn, William Dalrymple, Bruce Chatwin, Eric Newby, Paul Theroux, Roger Tory Peterson, Rory Stewart, and David Allen Sibley, and others.

A combination of high rents and the declining fortunes of downtown Boston retail prompted the company to close the downtown branch in March 1997. The company sold its lease at 500 Boylston Street in the Back Bay to Boston Private Bank in December 2000. In 2010, the store's owner put the remaining Cambridge store up for sale, citing personal health concerns—a diagnosis of a seizure disorder. After entertaining several bids, none were found to satisfactorily ensure continued operations of the store and its closing was announced.

The Globe Corner Bookstores served its last bricks-and-mortar customer on July 4, 2011, having served over 2 million customers. The website and name were purchased by Brookline Booksmith of Brookline, Massachusetts in May 2012.
