= Great Oulu fire of 1705 =

Fire in Oulu, Finland

The great Oulu fire of 1705 destroyed the parts of the city of Oulu, Finland. It consists of two fires in total, the first of which occurred on 20 July 1705, and the second on 28 August of the same year. A total of 144 houses and 121 granaries from the third and fourth districts of the city burned down in the fires.

The July fire was the largest of these. The fire started in Knuutti Juhonpoika's kitchen, where the maid Valpuri Pietarintytär was preparing liquor mash. Aided by the strong wind, the fire spread quickly in the then IV district, and practically the entire district burned to the ground. The fire in August started when the fire escaped from the shed of Tuomas Jakku's house. The fire destroyed 39 of the houses that were saved from the previous fire, and in addition most of the granaries in the Hahtiperä area also burned.

The area of the city was reduced by moving the customs fence towards the city center. Those whose estates were outside the customs fence were given estates in the center of the city. It was decided to leave free space between Hahtiperä's waterfront sheds and the town's houses.

== See also ==
- Great Oulu fire (disambiguation)
