= The Great Fire (Vanity Fair) =

2020 issue of Vanity Fair

"The Great Fire", the September 2020 issue of Vanity Fair, was guest-edited by Ta-Nehisi Coates and dedicated to topics of racial justice.
