= Great Oulu fire of 1882 =

Fire in Oulu, Finland

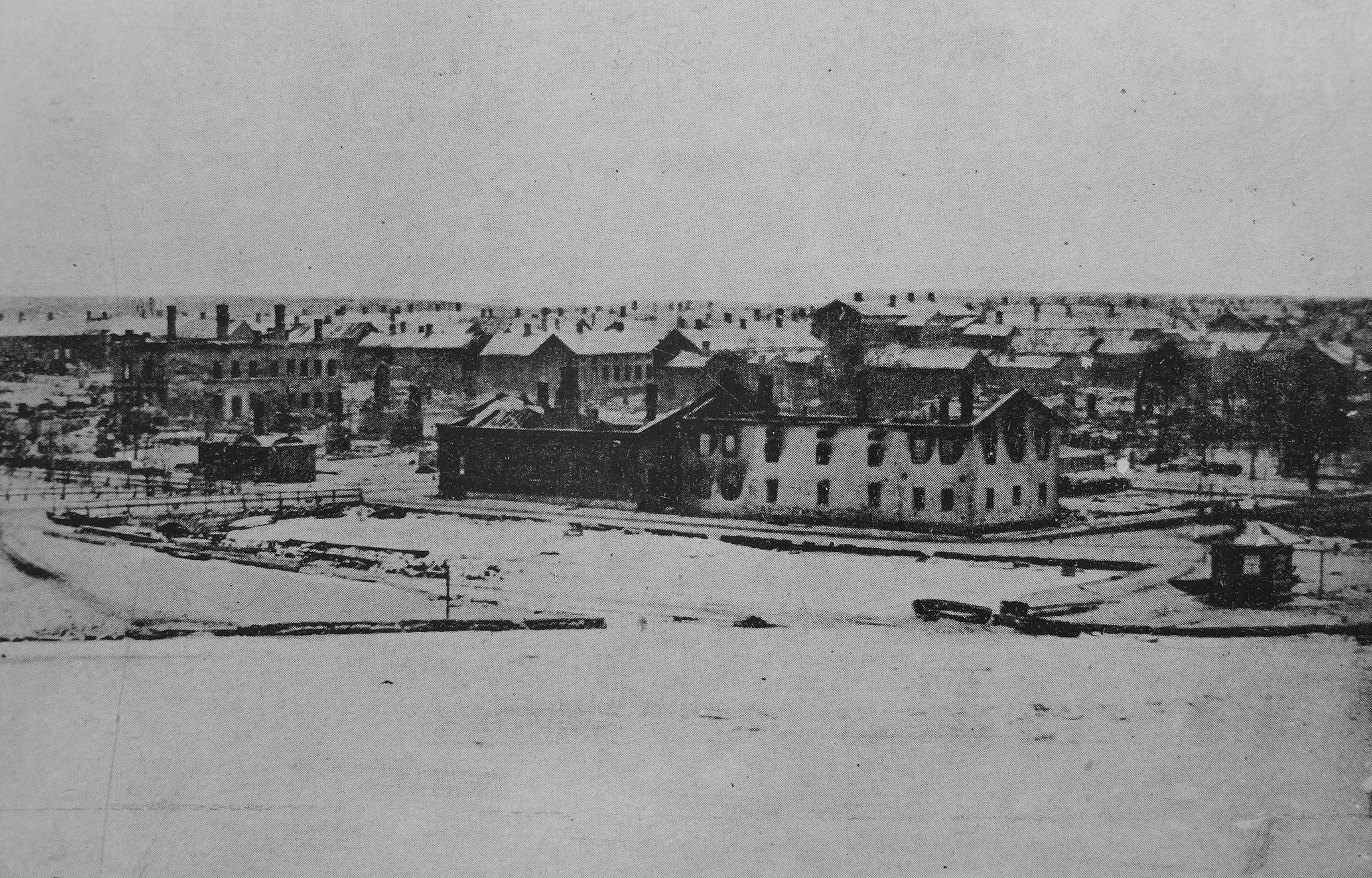
Oulu lying in ruins after the fire

The great Oulu fire of 1882 was a conflagration that started in the basement of the pharmacy on the corner of Kirkkokatu and Pakkahuoneenkatu on the evening of 2 November, destroying 27 buildings along Hallituskatu and Pakkahuoneenkatu in downtown Oulu, Finland, amongst them the city-owned Seurahuone. The basement was used to store gasoline and other flammable materials, which led to the fire quickly raging out of control. It headed towards the Oulu River and destroyed the salt and grain warehouses along its shoreline. The fire brigade, however, managed to keep the fire from spreading to the packhouse.

== See also ==
- Great Oulu fire (disambiguation)
