= Great Oulu fire of 1652 =

Fire in Oulu, Finland

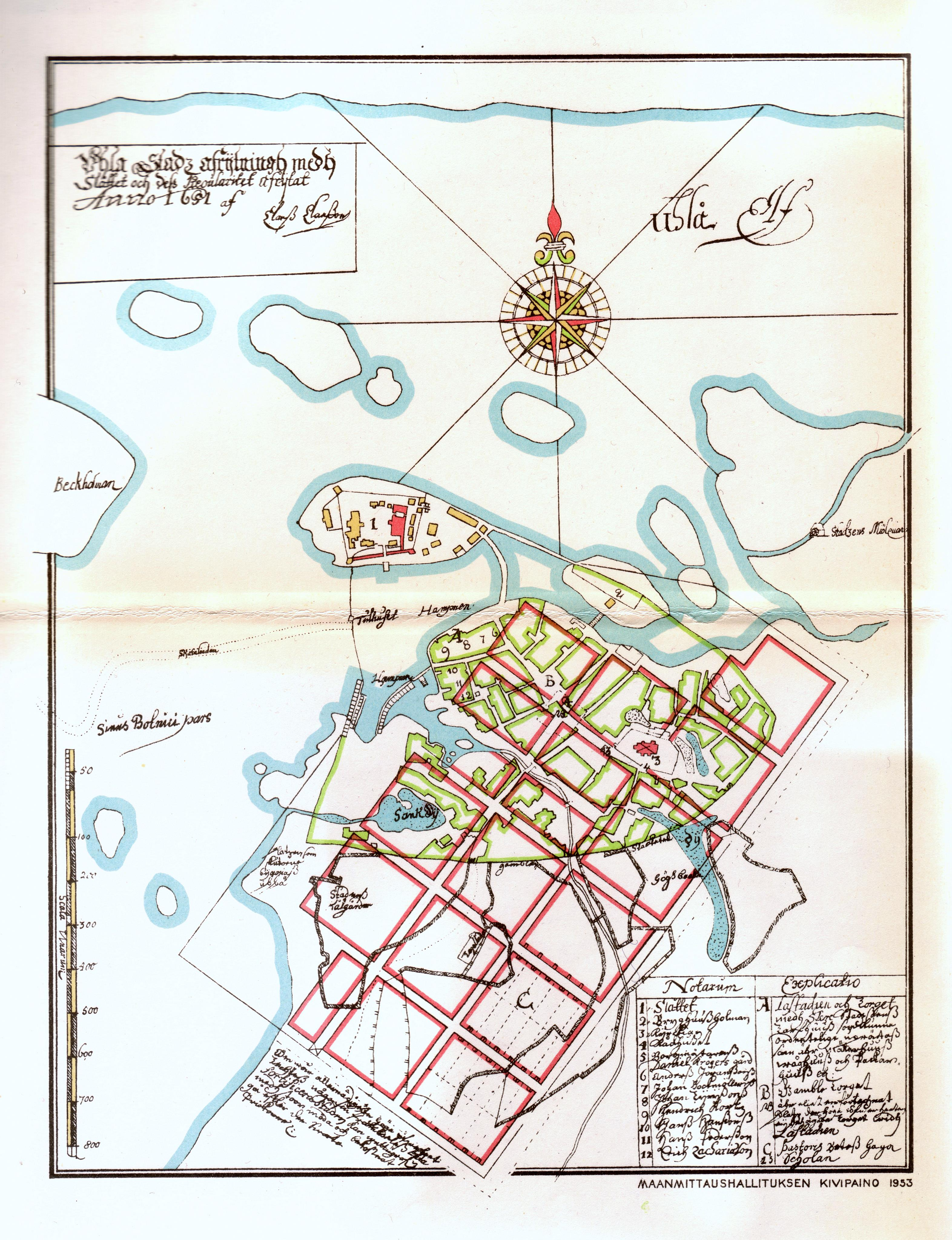
A map of Oulu by Claes Claesson from 1651

The great Oulu fire of 1652 destroyed the majority of the young city of Oulu, Finland on 2 October 1652. Almost all of the houses of the town's bourgeoisie, the provision warehouses in which the Crown's grain and money was stored and the drawbridge of Oulu Castle were destroyed.

The city was rebuilt after the fire according to the city plan drawn up by surveyor Claes Claesson in 1651. The new city plan doubled the surface area of the town. At the same time, the streets and city blocks were laid out in a more regular fashion. The shoreline of the Oulu River was turned into a marketplace that had its own measuring house, a weigh house, and, of course, a packhouse.

== See also ==
- Great Oulu fire (disambiguation)
