= Great Fire of Whitstable, 1869 =

Fire in Whitstable, Kent, England

Coordinates: 51°21′40″N 1°1′25″E

The Great Fire of Whitstable in 1869 devastated the coastal town of Whitstable in Kent, England.

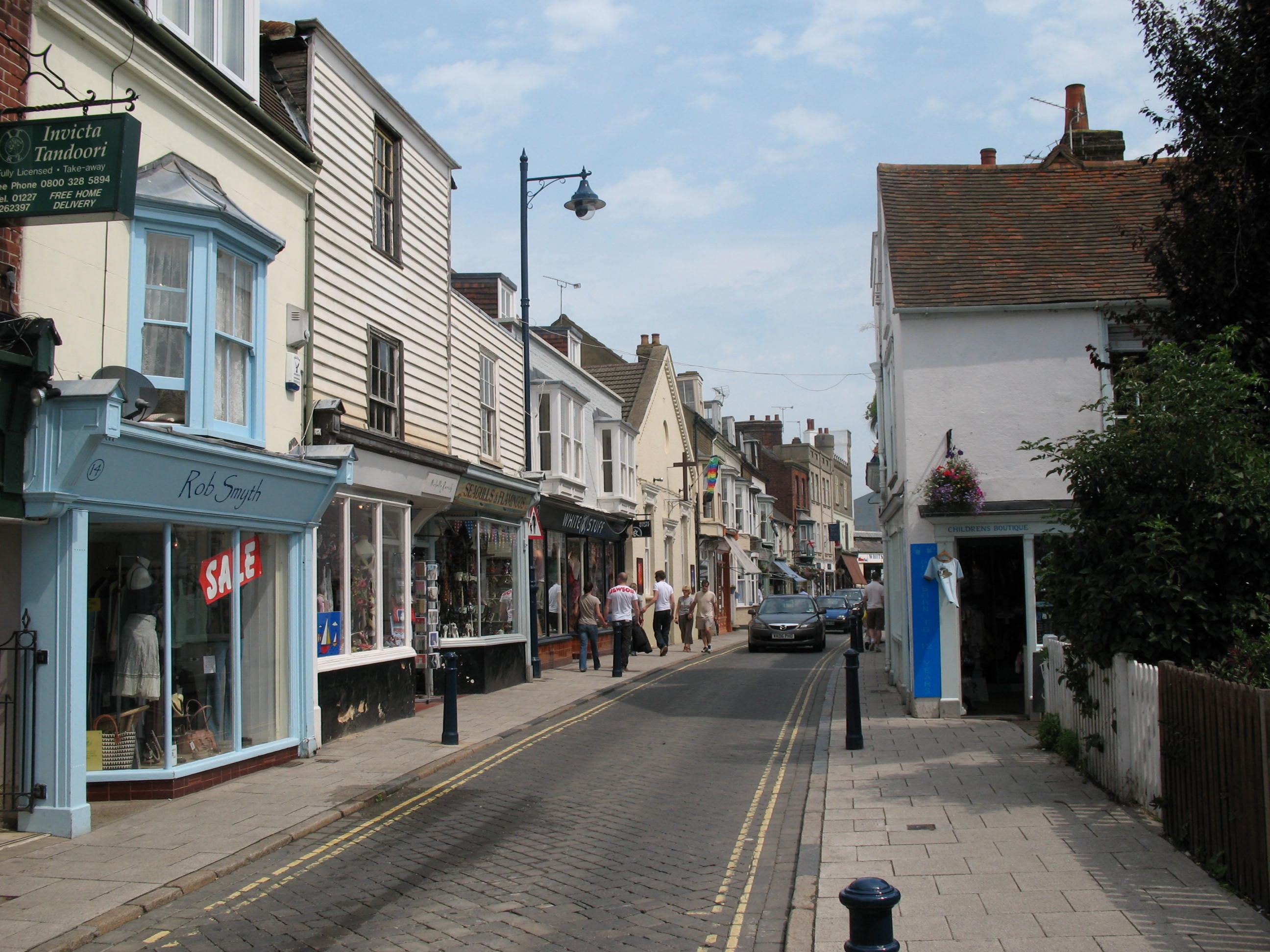
Harbour Street today

On the evening of Wednesday, 10 November 1869, the fire swept through The Wall, west of the town's harbour. Given that the population of the town was a little under 2,000, the disaster that befell the little fishing harbour must have been big news across the region, as the fire drew a crowd of 10,000 spectators. It was the local coastguard, Edwin George Lane, who on 16 November at about 10.45 p.m. spotted flames coming from the roof of a shop. He raised the alarm and a large crowd gathered.

Winds caused the inferno to be carried into Marine Street, and Harbour Street beyond, causing great damage where almost all the buildings were destroyed. It was not until 8 a.m. the next morning that the flames were extinguished, although firemen stayed for several hours to put out the smouldering embers.
