= Great Oulu fire of 1916 =

Fire in Oulu, Finland

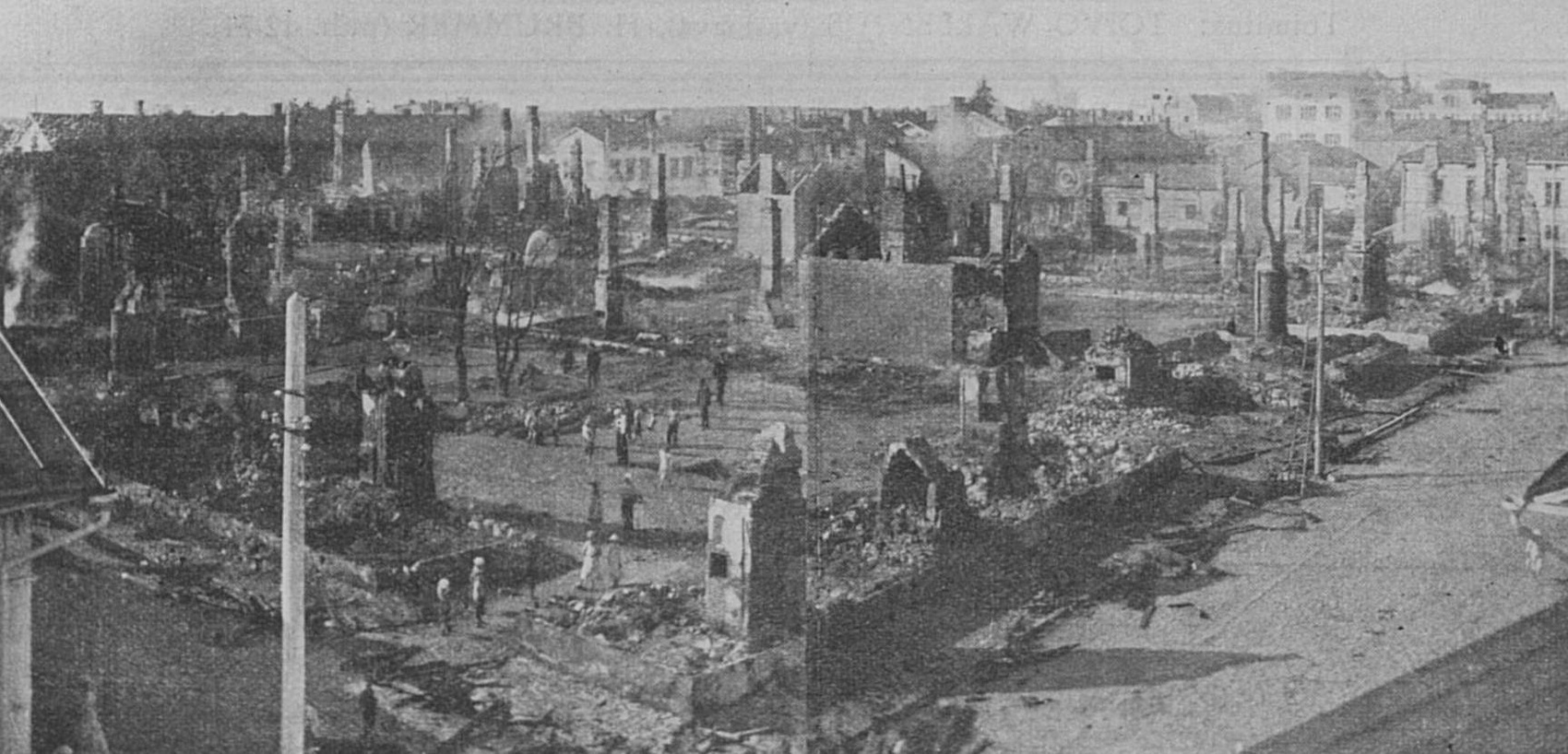
The destroyed city block after the fire

The great Oulu fire of 1916 was Finland’s last urban fire, which left 200 people homeless.

The fire started during the night of July 19 in an outbuilding located at the back corner of Kirkkokatu 39. No reason for the fire was ever determined. The fire destroyed nearly all of the buildings in the city block delimited by the streets of Kirkkokatu, Sepänkatu, Isonkatu and Albertinkatu that the district of Vanhatulli was located on; the block is currently home to Oulu’s Mannerheim Park. The buildings across the streets from the city block were also damaged to varying degrees, which just barely meets the requirements for being an urban fire; otherwise, this would have been classified as a block fire. The buildings located on the corner of Isokatu and Albertinkatu were gutted and had to be razed afterwards.

== Consequences ==
The fire resulted in the first permanent fire brigade being established in Oulu, even if it was only in 1921 that it was finally established. A proposal to widen the streets was also considered, but it would have cost too much to buy the houses from their owners, so the plan was abandoned.

== See also ==
- Great Oulu fire (disambiguation)
