= Great Boston Fire of 1711 =

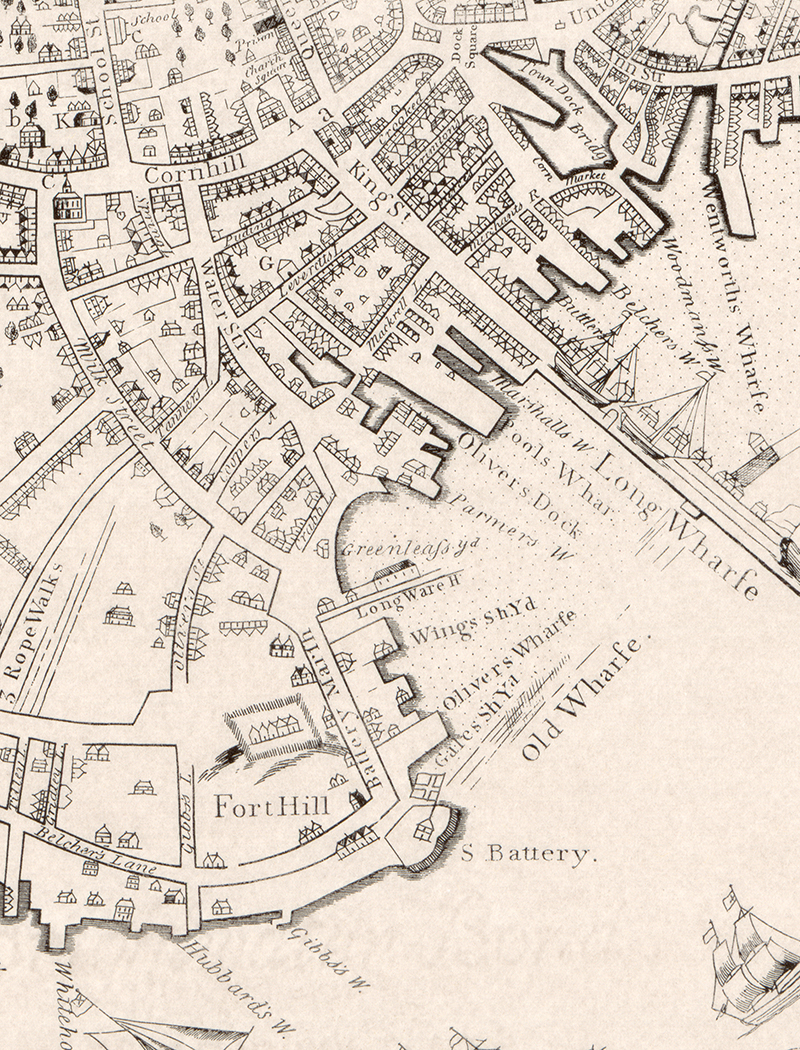
Map of central Boston in 1722, eleven years after the fire. The Old State House, marked as "a" near the top, and the Old Brick Church, marked as "A," were built in the immediate aftermath of the fire, replacing buildings that had been destroyed in the blaze

The Great Boston Fire of 1711 burned the central district of Boston, then the capital of the Province of Massachusetts Bay, on October 2–3, 1711. The fire destroyed approximately one hundred buildings, including the Town House and First Meeting House, and resulted in several fatalities.

== Background ==
Fire was a major threat to Boston in its early history. The first recorded outbreak took place as early as 1630–31, and fires were a regular feature of town life in the following decades. Wood was generally the most common material used for houses in the early settlement, and as Boston grew in density it became easy for conflagrations to spread from house to house and even level significant sections of the town. Several "great" fires of particular significance occurred in this period, including in 1653, 1676, 1679, 1682, and 1691, although these would subsequently be eclipsed by the fire of 1711, which thereafter became known as "the" great fire.

Given the ever-present danger of fire, colonial and town authorities repeatedly enacted measures in an attempt to mitigate future major outbreaks. In 1679, the General Court passed its first building regulation by mandating that any new dwelling in the town be of stone or brick and covered with slate or tile, unless the builder received an exemption by the selectmen to use other materials. In 1683, the legislature passed a more stringent code which extended the regulation of building materials to any new "dwelling-house, warehouse, shop, barn, stable, or any other housing" in Boston, although in the following year it allowed for any small building less than eight feet in length and seven feet tall to be made of wood. Despite these provisions, however, wooden buildings remained predominant well into the eighteenth century; as late as 1722, for example, a survey found that approximately two-thirds of Boston's nearly 3,000 houses were made of timber. Several laws and acts were also passed to prevent chimney fires, provide for ladders, fire engines, gunpowder, and water for firefighters, and restrict the use of incendiary materials.

== Fire ==
At around 7:00 on the evening of October 2, 1711, a fire broke out at a small tenement located in a backyard off Cornhill (now Washington Street). A Scottish woman named Mary Morse was handling oakum when it was ignited by a nearby flame, and the burning material quickly became uncontrollable.

The fire soon spread throughout central Boston, which was at the time the most thickly settled and wealthiest part of the town, being filled with both dwellings and stores. Leaping from property to property, it destroyed both sides of Cornhill; from there it made its way southwest to School Street and northeast to Dock Square. A substantial portion of Pudding Lane (now Devonshire Street) was devastated, as were both sides of the upper portions of King (now State) and Queen (now Court) Streets.

Lieutenant Governor William Tailer, who arrived in town the next day, reported that the fire was visible from twenty leagues' distance. The blaze was finally brought under control by 2:00 on the morning of October 3, by which time a considerable portion of the business district had been burnt.

== Damage and casualties ==
"Thus the town of Boston, just going to get beyond four score years of age, and conflicting with much larger labour and sorrow, is, a very vital and valuable part of it, soon cut off, and flown away."

— Cotton Mather, in his account of the fire

The fire destroyed approximately one hundred houses and rendered 110 families homeless. It consumed the post office as well as two of the town's most prominent properties: the Town House (built 1658), which served as the seat of the provincial and town governments, and the old Meeting House (built 1640) of Boston's First Church. The printing office of John Allen on Pudding Lane, which was responsible for publishing The Boston News-Letter, was likewise ruined. The fire also burned through many shops and destroyed their inventories, resulting in "not a little of the wealth of the town [being] consumed."

Several deaths are known to have occurred, although the exact number is unknown. A group of sailors had ascended to the steeple of the old meeting house in an attempt to save its bell, but the fire cut off their escape path and they fell in when the roof collapsed; their remains were later recovered from the debris. Many more were killed from venturing too far into the fire or from the use of gunpowder to blow up homes in order to create firebreaks, and "strangers belonging to the vessels" were also believed to have added to the number perished. Several people were also wounded and later succumbed from their injuries.

== Aftermath ==
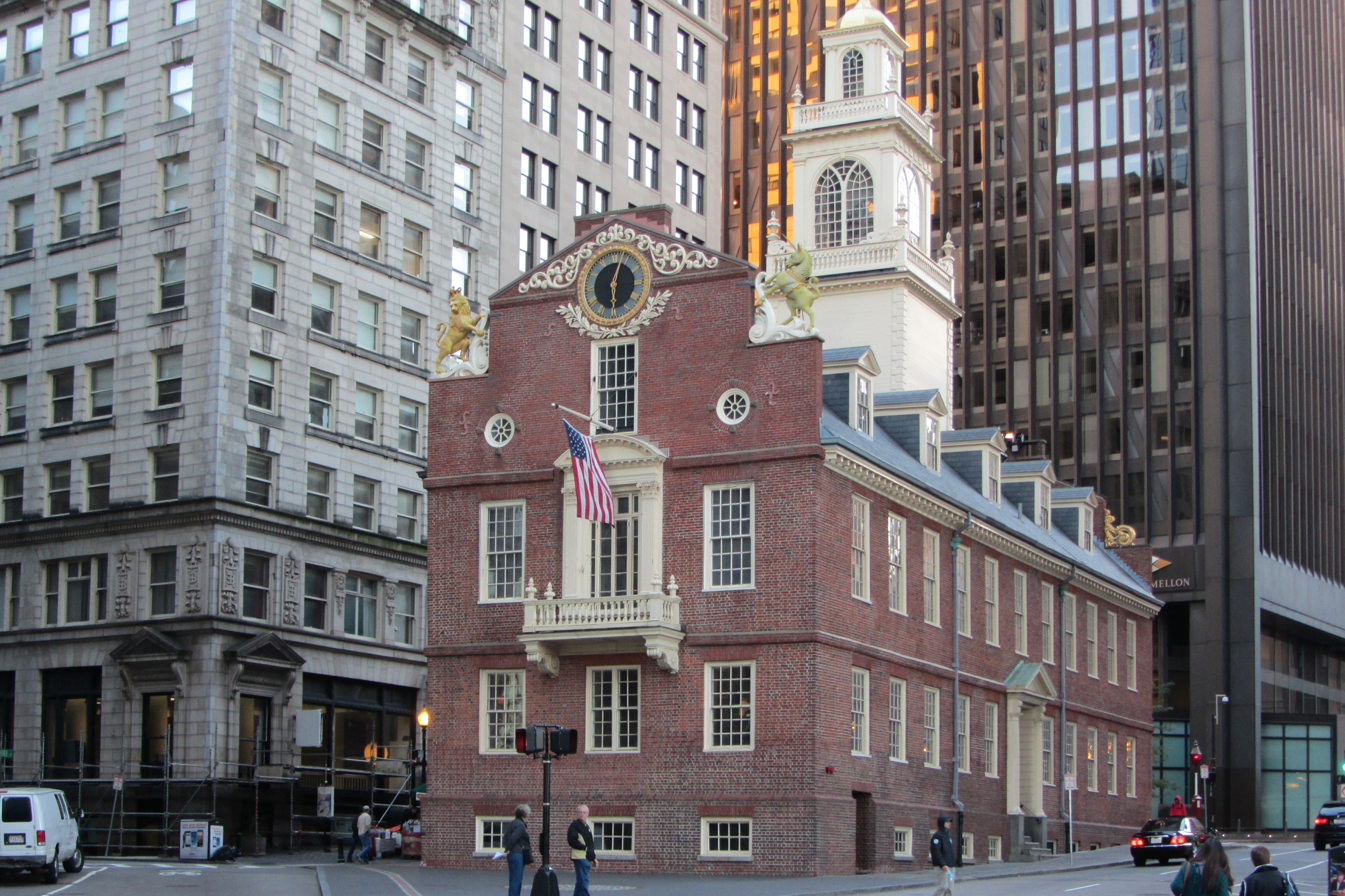
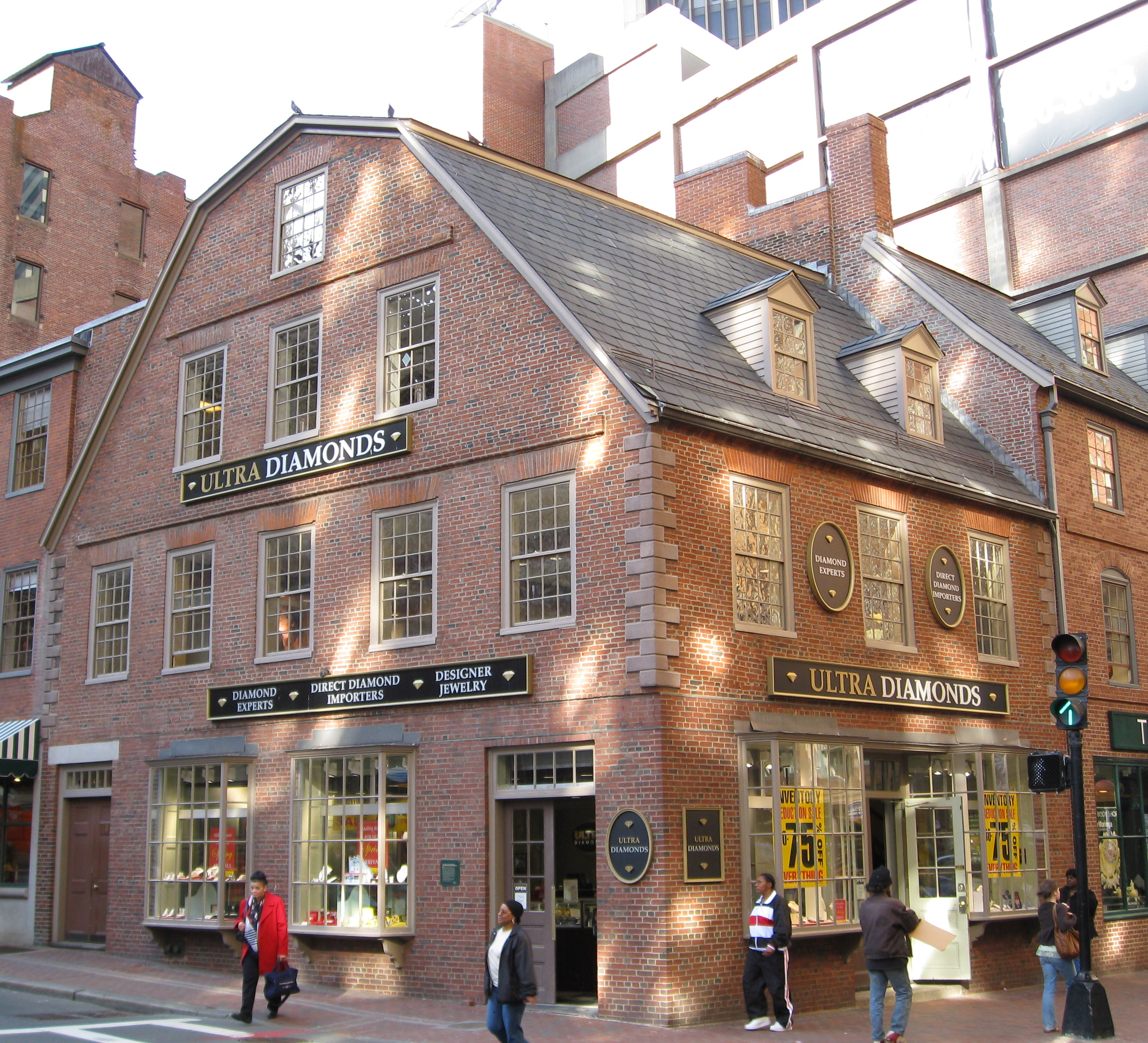
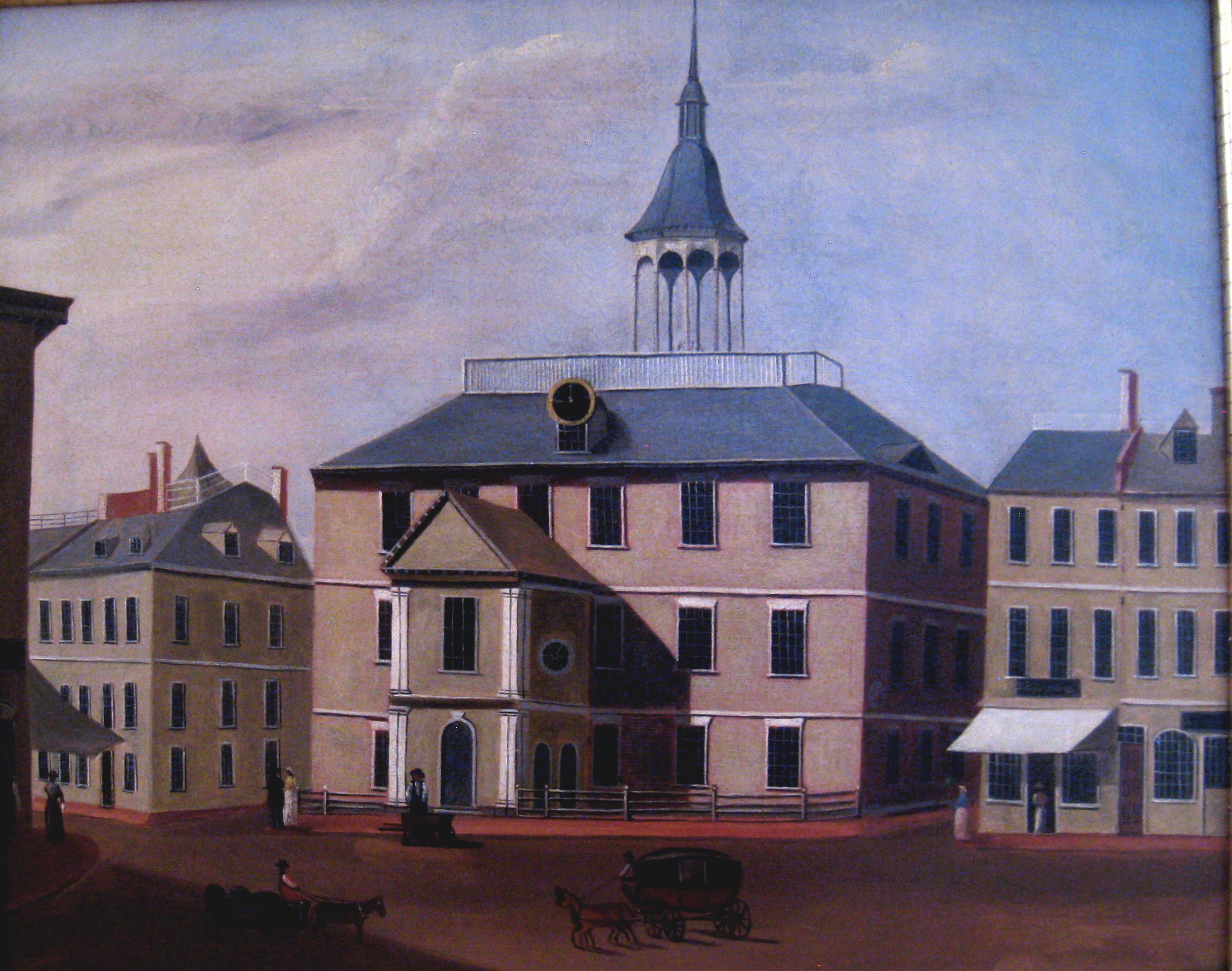
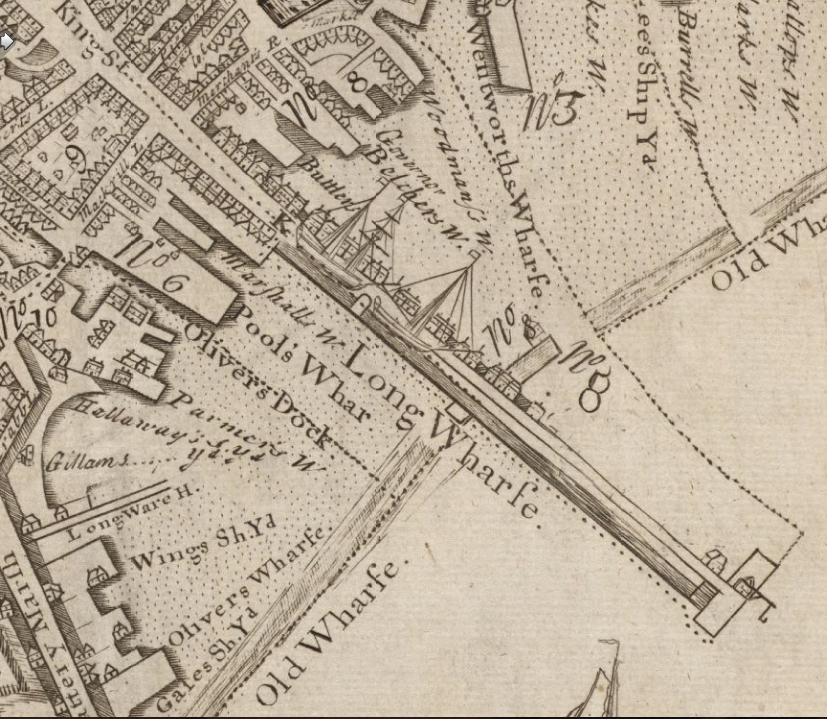
The Old State House, Old Corner Bookstore, and Old Brick Church were built in the immediate aftermath of the fire, and rubbish from the ruins was used in the construction of Long Wharf.

A relief effort was undertaken by the local churches after the fire, raising a total of £700 for the victims. On October 18, a general fast was kept in commemoration of both the fire and the recent failure of the Quebec expedition in Queen Anne's War.

The burnt area was quickly rebuilt. New brick houses were erected on Cornhill, described as being three stories in height, each with a garret, flat roof, and balustrade. The old Meeting House and Town House were also replaced with new brick structures near the intersection of King Street and Cornhill, becoming known as the Old Brick Church and the Old State House respectively. A few years later the Old Corner Bookstore, at the corner of Cornhill and School Street, was likewise built to replace a property destroyed in the blaze. Rubbish collected for the clearing of the ruins was used to help fill in Long Wharf, which was then under construction.

As a result of the disaster, Boston was divided into fire districts which would be headed by up to ten fire wards. The wards were to be given authority to command firefighting efforts and require assistance as necessary, and were also empowered to demolish houses if so directed by the chief civil or military officers of the town. As a badge of office, they were to be given a staff, "five feet in length coulered [sic] red, and headed with a bright bass spire of six inches long."

The severity of the conflagration was such that the incident was for some time thereafter known as Boston's "Great Fire." It would however later be overshadowed by the Great Boston Fire of 1760, and subsequently by the much larger Great Boston Fire of 1872.
