= Great Boston Fire of 1760 =

Fire which destroyed much of downtown Boston, Massachusetts

Coordinates: 42.3575°N 71.0584°W

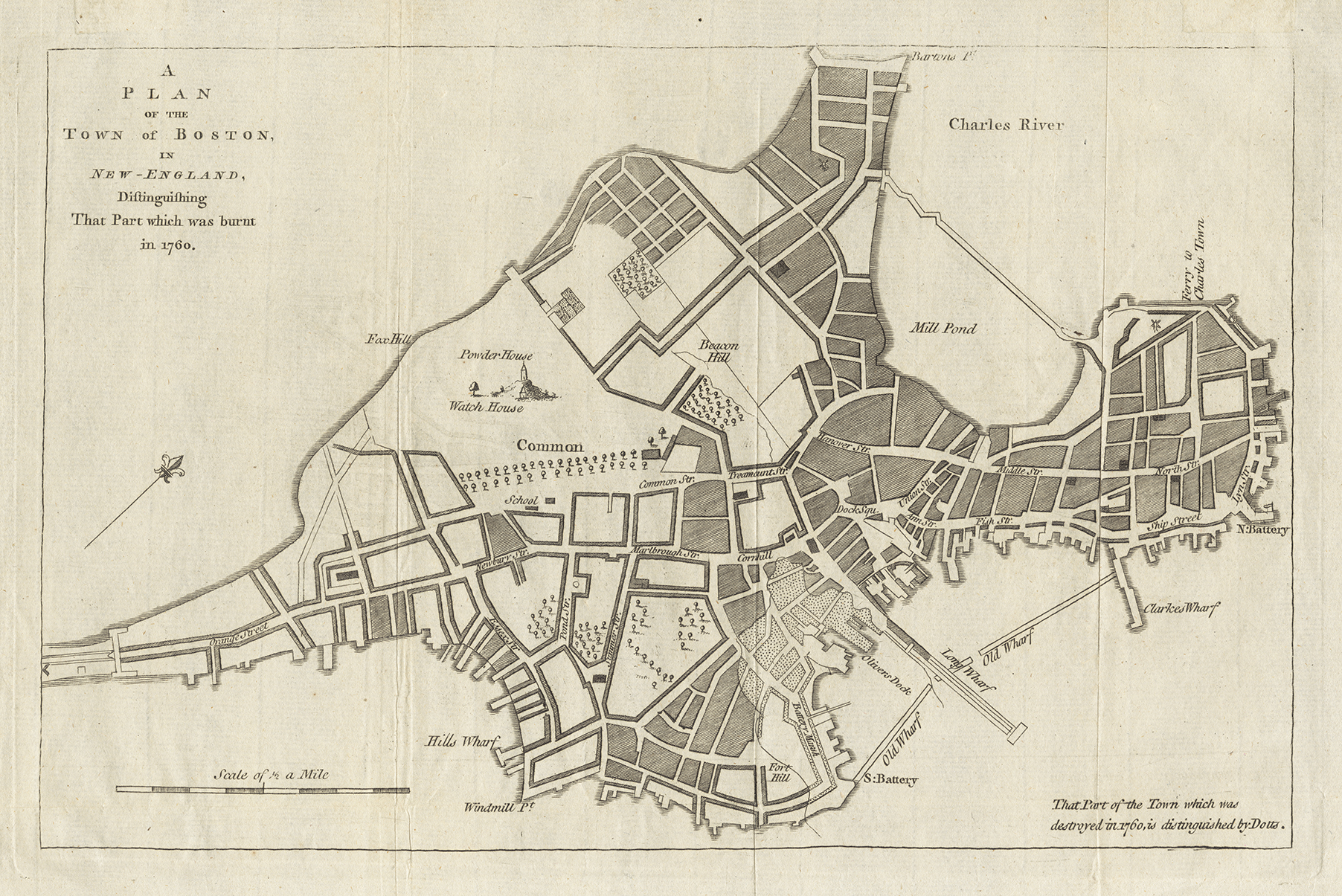
Map of Boston in 1760, showing the extent of the Great Fire (dotted area)

The Great Boston Fire of 1760 occurred on March 20, 1760, in Boston in the Province of Massachusetts Bay. The fire destroyed 349 buildings in the area between the modern Washington Street and Fort Hill, as well as several ships in port, and it left more than a thousand people homeless.

== Background ==
The town of Boston was repeatedly damaged by fire in its colonial history, with serious conflagrations taking place in 1653, 1676, 1679, 1682, 1691, 1711, and 1753. The term "Great Fire" had previously been reserved for the fire of 1711, which had destroyed the First Town-House, but the 1760 blaze proved to be significantly larger and rendered 1711 as "comparatively unimportant."

Boston suffered from a series of large fires in March 1760. On March 17, a blaze damaged several buildings in the West End, including the wooden meeting house which stood on the site of the Old West Church. On the following day, a fire broke out in a building occupied by the Royal Artillery on Griffin's Wharf and soon spread to a quantity of gunpowder and weapons, causing an explosion that destroyed the building and wounded four or five men.

== The Great Fire ==
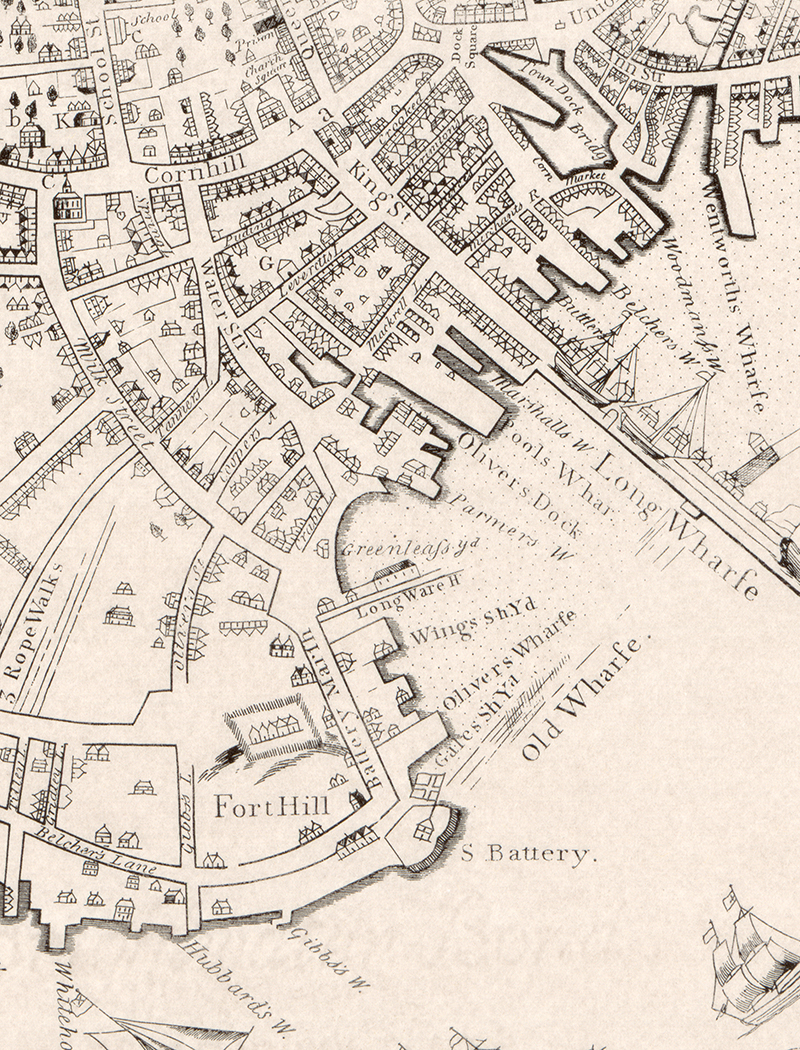
Map of the area affected by the fire. The Old State House is marked as "a" near the top, while the Old South Meeting House is marked as "C."

At about 2 a.m. on March 20, a fire of unknown cause broke out at a dwelling in Cornhill (modern Washington Street, nearly opposite to Pie Alley). The blaze was prevented from spreading much to the north or south, but it aggressively made its way to the east to Oliver's Dock on the harbor, destroying most of the structures in its path. A veer in the wind caused the fire to change direction toward King Street (now State Street), burning the homes on the corner opposite the Bunch-of-Grapes tavern and damaging the warehouses toward the Long Wharf.

On its southeastern side, the fire expanded from Water Street to Milk Street, where it consumed many of the houses to the west and east. From there it advanced via Batterymarch to Fort Hill, taking most of the buildings along the way, and reached the South artillery battery. A panic arose over the presence of a large deposit of gunpowder near the battery, but most of the store was hurriedly removed just before the fire reached the area. The remaining powder was ignited by the blaze, however, causing a huge explosion which was heard as far away as Hampton, New Hampshire.

== Aftermath ==
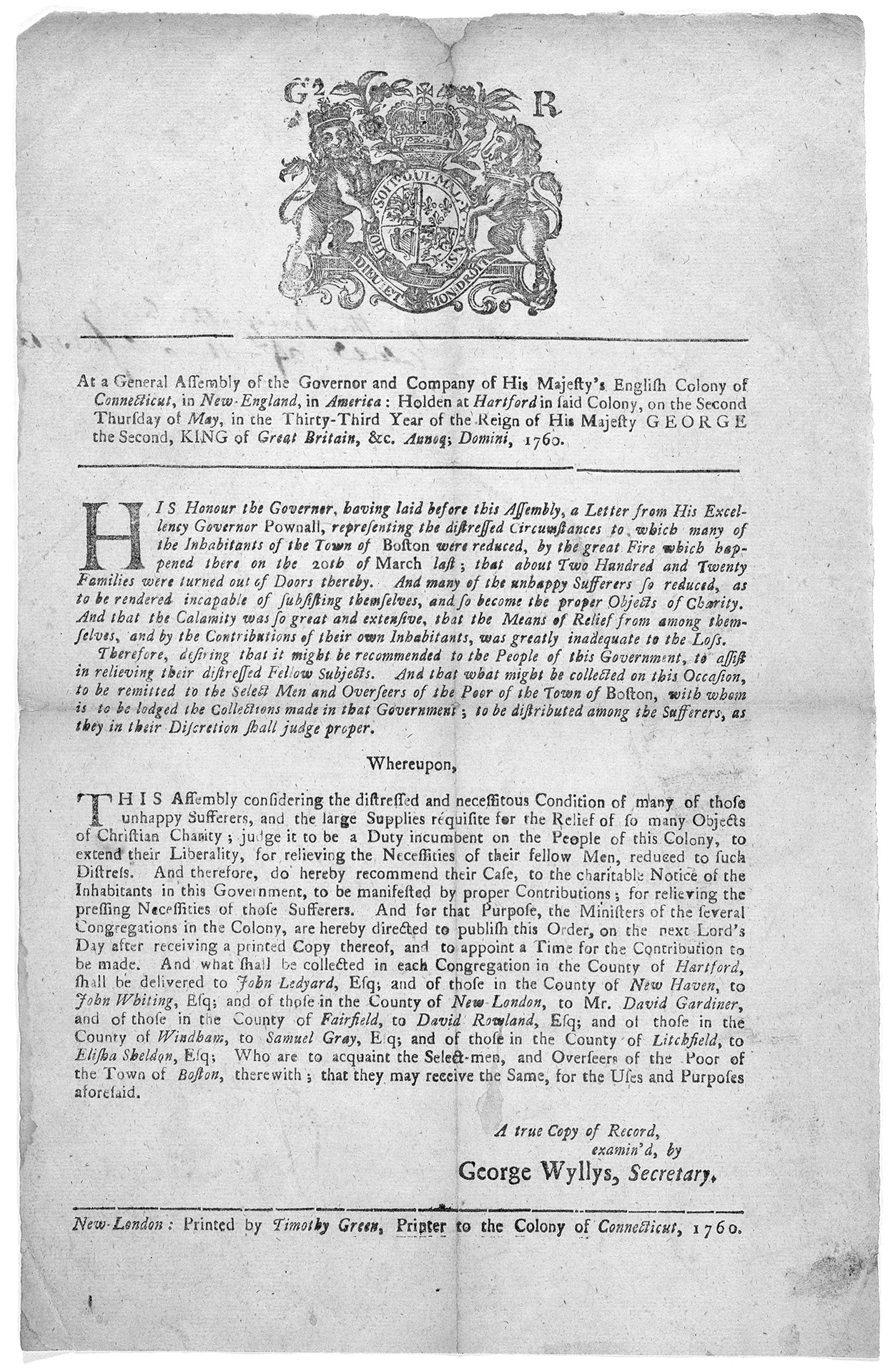
Order of the Connecticut General Assembly, instructing all congregational ministers in the colony to assist in raising donations for the people of Boston following the fire

The 1760 fire was described by one contemporary writer as "the most terrible Fire that has happened" in Boston up to that time, although it was subsequently eclipsed by the Great Boston Fire of 1872. 174 houses and 175 warehouses, shops, and other buildings were destroyed in the blaze, leaving more than a thousand people homeless, and the total estimated losses of £53,334 hit especially hard in a town that had already "borne the extraordinary Expence" of the French and Indian War. The human toll of the conflagration, however, was relatively light, with none reported dead and only a few wounded.

In the immediate aftermath of the fire, the Massachusetts colonial legislature advanced £3,000 to Boston for relief assistance. Over the following months, the town received several donations from throughout the British Empire as news of the disaster spread. The Assemblies of Pennsylvania and New York voted to send relief funds, while in Nova Scotia a significant amount of money was raised for the town, and individuals from as far away as London sent contributions. A petition for assistance was also sent to either King George II (who died that same year) or George III, but what action was taken by the monarchy as a result is unknown.

In order to prevent a similar disaster from occurring in the future, the Massachusetts legislature passed new laws and acts that improved fire safety standards in Boston. Any new building more than seven feet (2.1 m) high that was made of wood would result in a fine, and a committee was appointed to re-lay the narrow streets of the burnt district. As a result of the new regulations, the homes that were rebuilt in the area were made of brick or slate instead of wood.
