= George Maynard =

George Maynard may refer to:

- George Maynard (film producer) (1909–1976), British film producer
- Pop Maynard (George Maynard, 1872–1962), traditional folk singer from Sussex, England
- George W. Maynard (1843–1923), American painter, illustrator and muralist
- George H. Maynard (1836–1927), Union Army soldier in the American Civil War and Medal of Honor recipient
