= Robert Keayne =

American politician

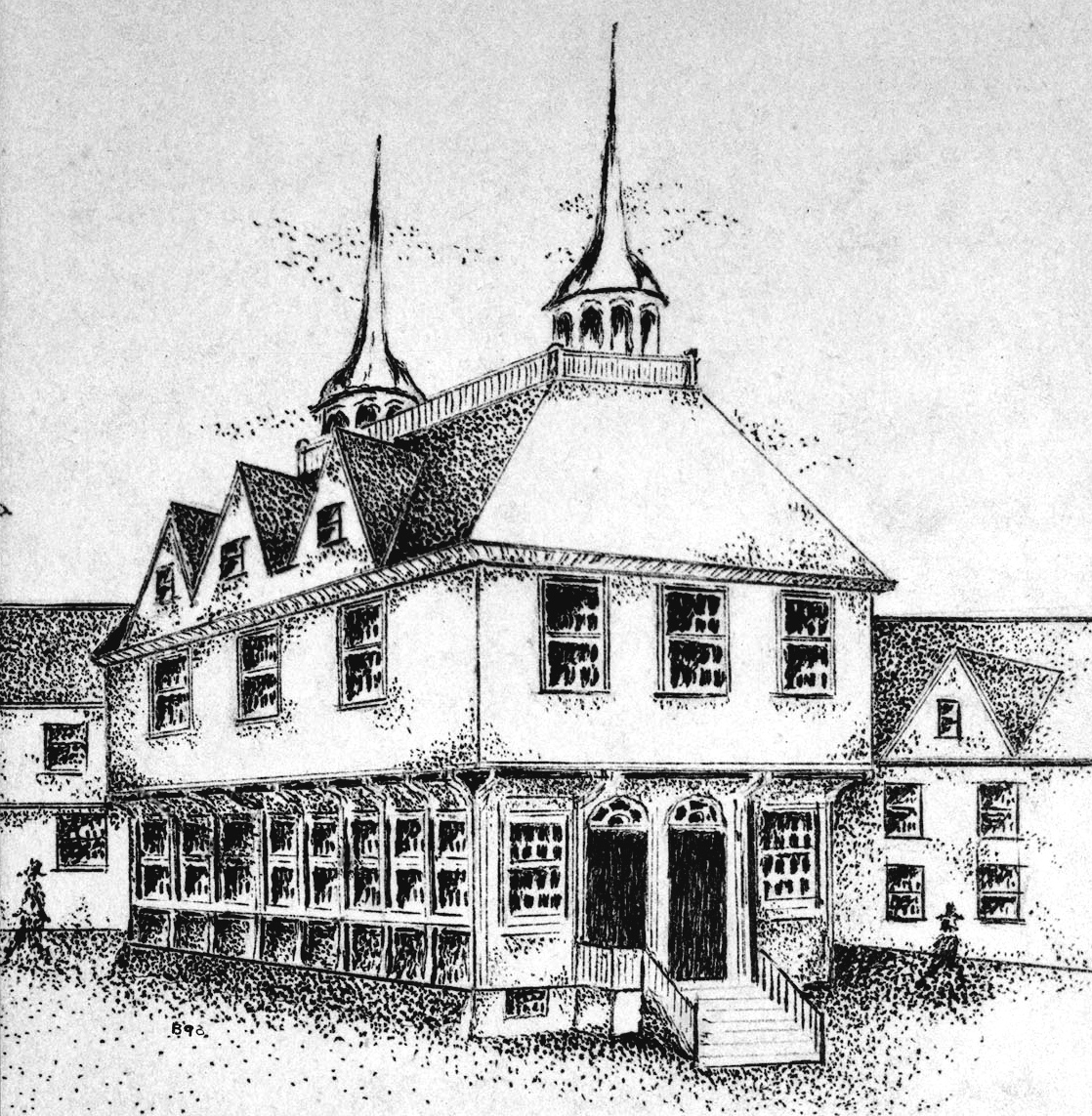
First Town-House, Boston.

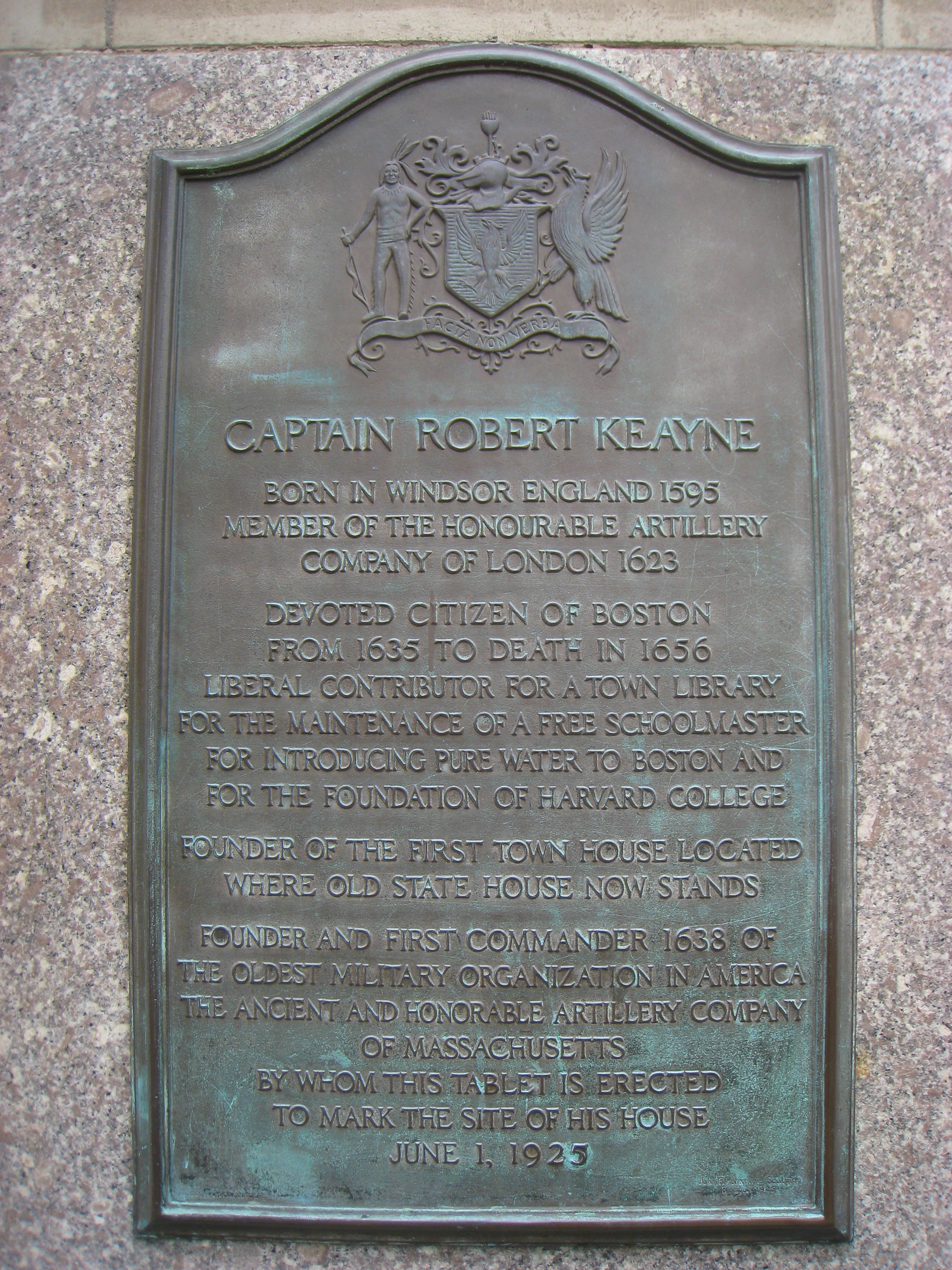
Boston plaque honoring Robert Keanye

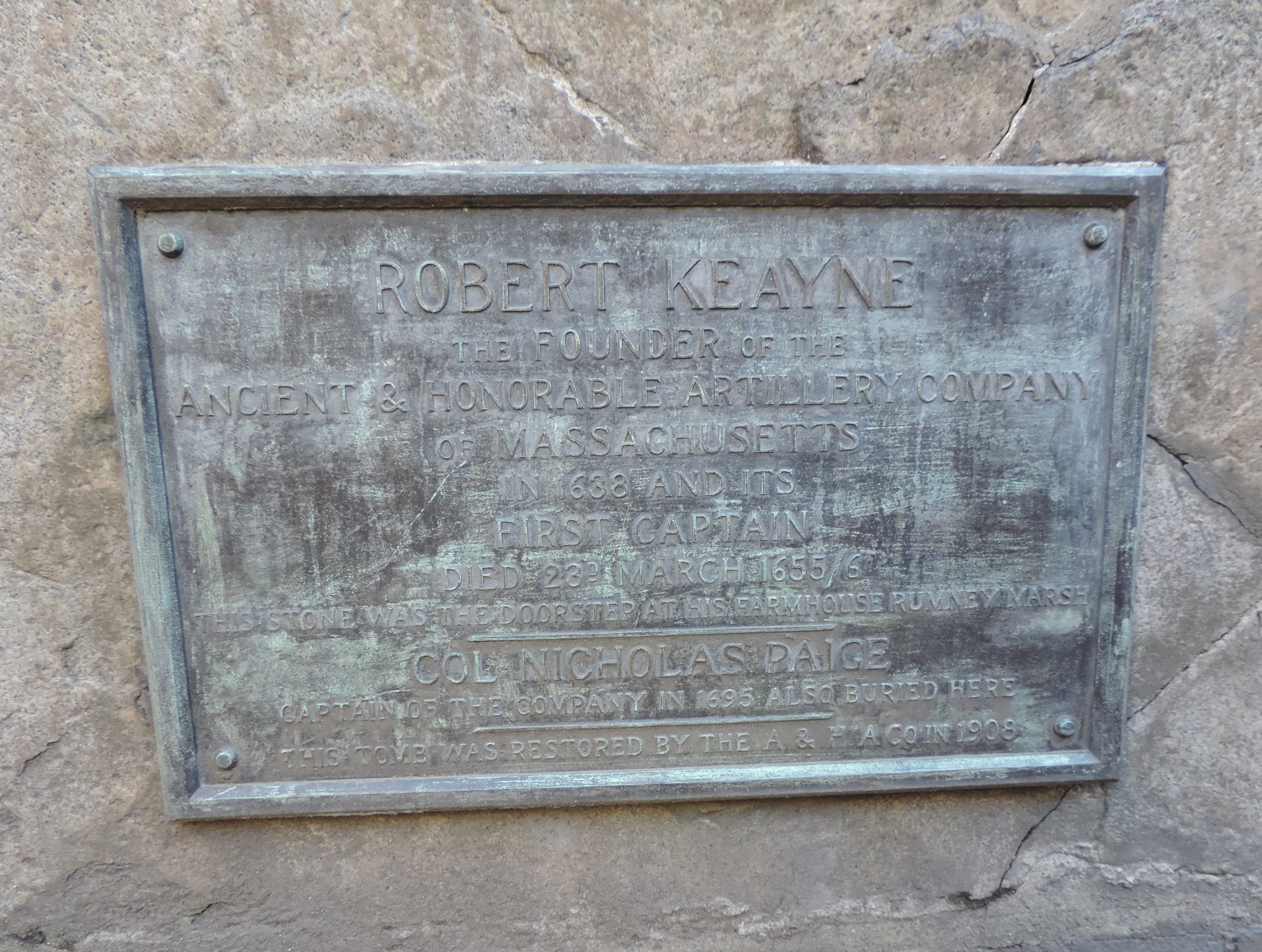
Plaque on burial vault in Kings Chapel Burying Ground, Boston

Robert Keayne (1595 – March 23, 1656) was a prominent public figure in 17th-century Boston, Massachusetts. He co-founded the Ancient and Honorable Artillery Company of Massachusetts and served as speaker of the House of the Massachusetts General Court. Keayne was a prosperous London merchant who joined his fellow Puritans in Boston where he built a fortune. He was accused of unfair business practices, and brought before the legislature, the Massachusetts General Court. It found Keayne guilty, fined him, and compelled him to confess his "sins." He proclaimed his innocence, and justified his actions in elaborate detail in his will. It bequeathed £2500 to Boston, to upgrade the infrastructure with an aqueduct, relieve the city's poor, and fund the First Town-House, a grand public meeting place. He attached a condition to the effect that the bequest would become void if there were any legal actions against his estate; there were none.

== Family life, career and Boston's First Church ==
Coat of Arms of Robert Keayne

Keayne was born in Windsor, England in 1595. His father, John Keayne, worked as a butcher. While living in London, Keayne held membership in the Honourable Artillery Company and the Merchant Taylor's Company. In 1617 Keayne married Anne Mansfield; they had a son, Benjamin Keayne, in 1619.

Keayne and his family arrived in Boston from London in 1635 on the ship Defence. In Boston, he worked as a tailor, and kept a shop on State Street, "living in apartments overhead, as was the custom in those times."

A member of the First Church congregation, Keayne kept notes in his private journal of sermons preached by Reverends John Wilson, Thomas Cobbett, and John Cotton, who had moved to Boston in 1633. Notes were also kept on Hugh Peters and John Davenport. By 1640, members of the church included Cobbett's assistant, the Rev. William Skipper (1597–c.1650) whose son, Theophilus (c.1633–c.1647), was later an apprentice of Keayne's son Benjamin (1618–1682). Like Keayne, Skepper was close to Cotton and Corbett, nominating both men as Theophilus's guardians. Records of the First Church state that on the 10th May 1642, Benjamin Keayne left the church to attend the church in Lynn where Skepper was living by 1646, "having come of age".

In 1637, Keayne was found guilty and fined 200 pounds by a Puritan court for overcharging customers. By today's capitalistic standards he would have been judged shrewd and successful. At the time, he penitently bewailed "his covetous and corrupt heart," but justified himself at length in his will.

In 1638, he helped to establish the Ancient and Honorable Artillery Company of Massachusetts, serving as first captain.

He served as town Selectman for several years; and as a representative to the Massachusetts General Court, being appointed House Speaker in 1646.

Keayne left a 37-page will, covering a range of topics, which notably left several hundred pounds to establish the First Town-House, a building to "be used by the town and county government and be shared by the military company, with convenience for a market and conduit near by." Remarking on the need for a covered market, he wrote:

I having long thought and considered the want of some necessary things of public concernment which may not be only comodious, but very profitable and useful for the Town of Boston, as a market place ... useful for the country people that come with their provisions for the supply of the towne, that they may have a place to sett dry in and warme, both in cold raine and durty weather, and may have a place to leave their corne or any other things safe that they cannot sell, till they come again, which would be both an encouragement to come in and a great means to increase trading in the Towne also.

== Divorce in colony ==
Some considerable pain entered Robert Keayne's last years as the marriage of his son Benjamin and his wife Sarah necessitated one of the colony's earliest divorces. Benjamin married Sarah, the daughter of Governor Thomas Dudley and a cousin of Stephen Winthrop (the son of John Winthrop) who proudly wrote about his cousin in a letter from London 27 March 1646: "My she [female] Cosin Keane is growne a great preacher".

However, in a letter dated London 18 March 1646/7, Benjamin Keayne writes to Thomas Dudley: Honored Sir, That you and myself are made sorry by your daughter's enormous and continued crimes, is the greatest cause of grief that ever befell me". He added: "I do plainly declare my resolution never again to live with her as a husband. What maintenance yourself expects I know not. This I know (to my cost and danger) she has unwived herself and how she or you can expect a wife's maintenance is to me a wonder...". Mr and Mrs Benjamin Keayne divorced in 1647.

== Death ==
Robert Keayne died in 1656 and is buried in the King's Chapel Burying Ground where a plaque has been affixed to his brick burial vault. Another memorial plaque, placed in 1925, honors Keayne in downtown Boston, on the corner of State and Washington Streets. Each year on the first Monday in June the Ancient and Honorable Artillery Company leads a procession to the gravesite, laying a wreath in Keayne's memory.
