= Ancient and Honorable Artillery Company of Massachusetts =

- Active: March 13, 1638–present
- Country: United States
- Allegiance: Massachusetts
- Type: Volunteer militia company
- Role: Honor guard State militia
- Garrison/HQ: Faneuil Hall; Boston, Massachusetts
- Nickname: "Grand Old Company"
- Mottos: Facta Non Verba ("Deeds Not Words")
- Website: http://www.ahac.us.com

Commanders
- Commander-in-Chief: Governor of Massachusetts
- Captain Commanding: Captain Stephen Colella

Insignia
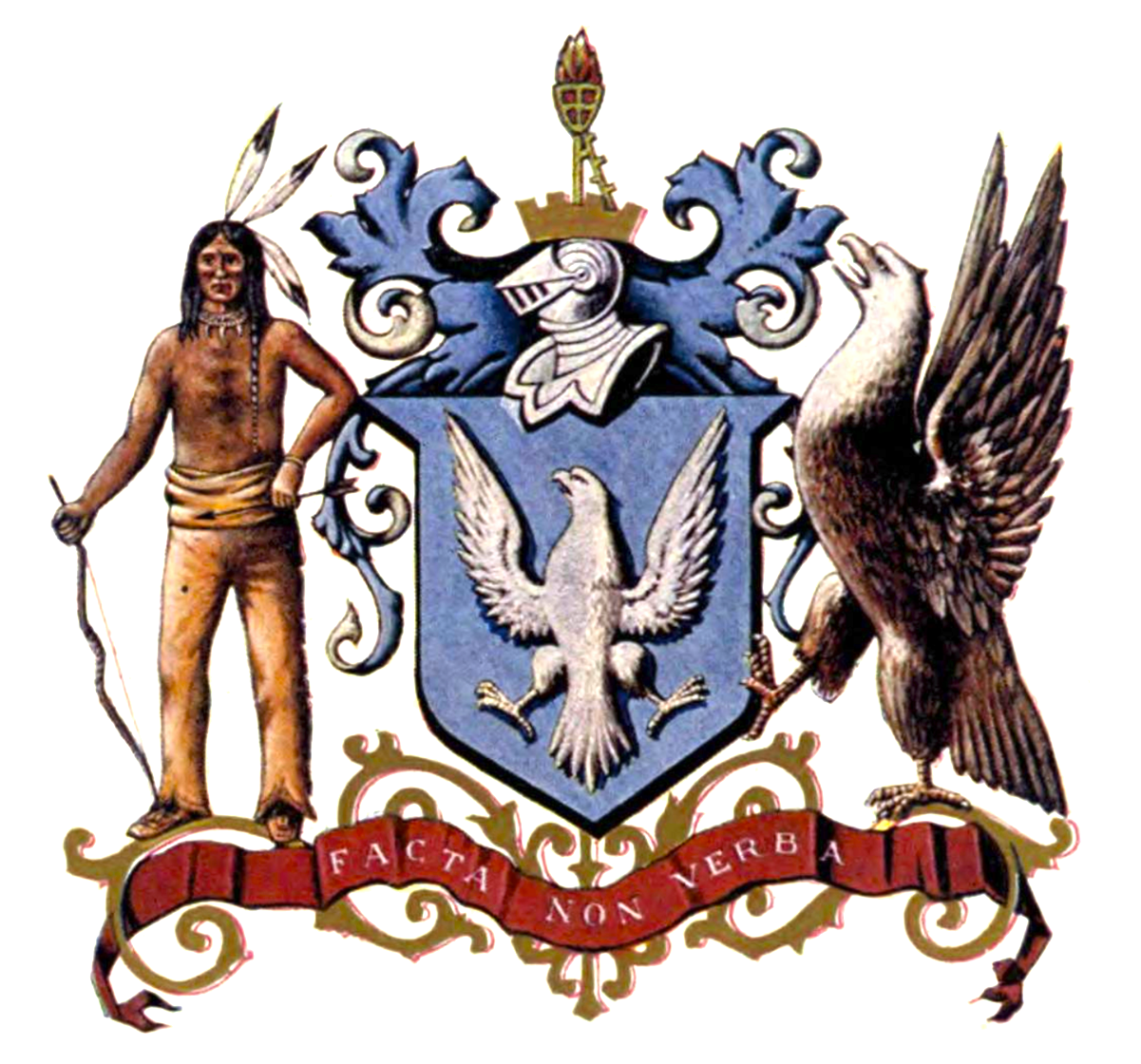
- Coat of Arms
- Abbreviation: AHAC

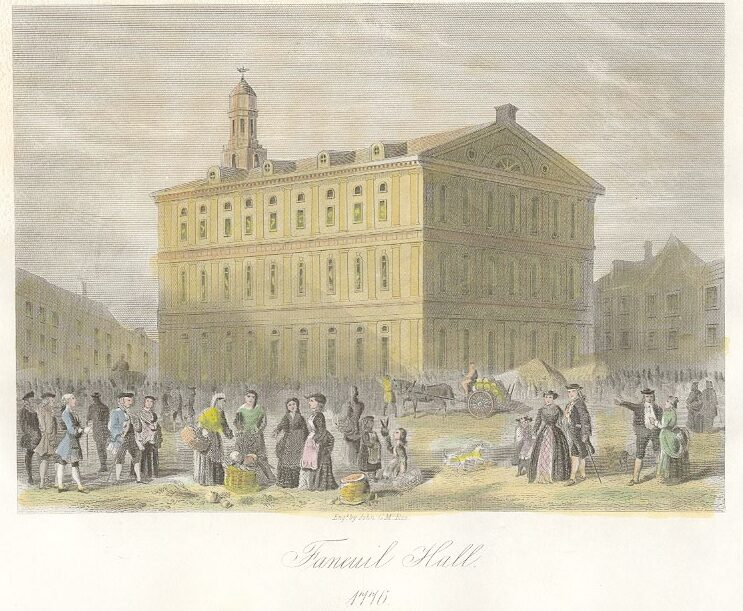
Faneuil Hall in 1776. The Artillery Company is headquartered on the fourth floor of Faneuil Hall.

The Ancient and Honorable Artillery Company of Massachusetts is the oldest chartered military organization in North America and the third oldest chartered military organization in the world. A volunteer militia of the Commonwealth of Massachusetts, it is not part of the U.S. Armed Forces, but includes veterans and serving military members within its ranks.

Its charter was granted in March 1638 by the Great and General Court of Massachusetts Bay and signed by Governor John Winthrop as a volunteer militia company to train officers enrolled in the local militia companies across Massachusetts. With the professionalization of the U.S. armed forces preceding World War I including the creation of the National Guard of the United States and the federalization of officer training, the company's mission changed to a supportive role in preserving the historic and patriotic traditions of Boston, Massachusetts, and the nation. Today the Company serves as Honor Guard to the governor of Massachusetts who is also its Commander-in-Chief, and its status as a military unit is preserved under Massachusetts state law.

The headquarters is located on the 4th floor of Faneuil Hall and consists of an armory, library, offices, quartermaster department, commissary, and military museum with free admission.

== History ==
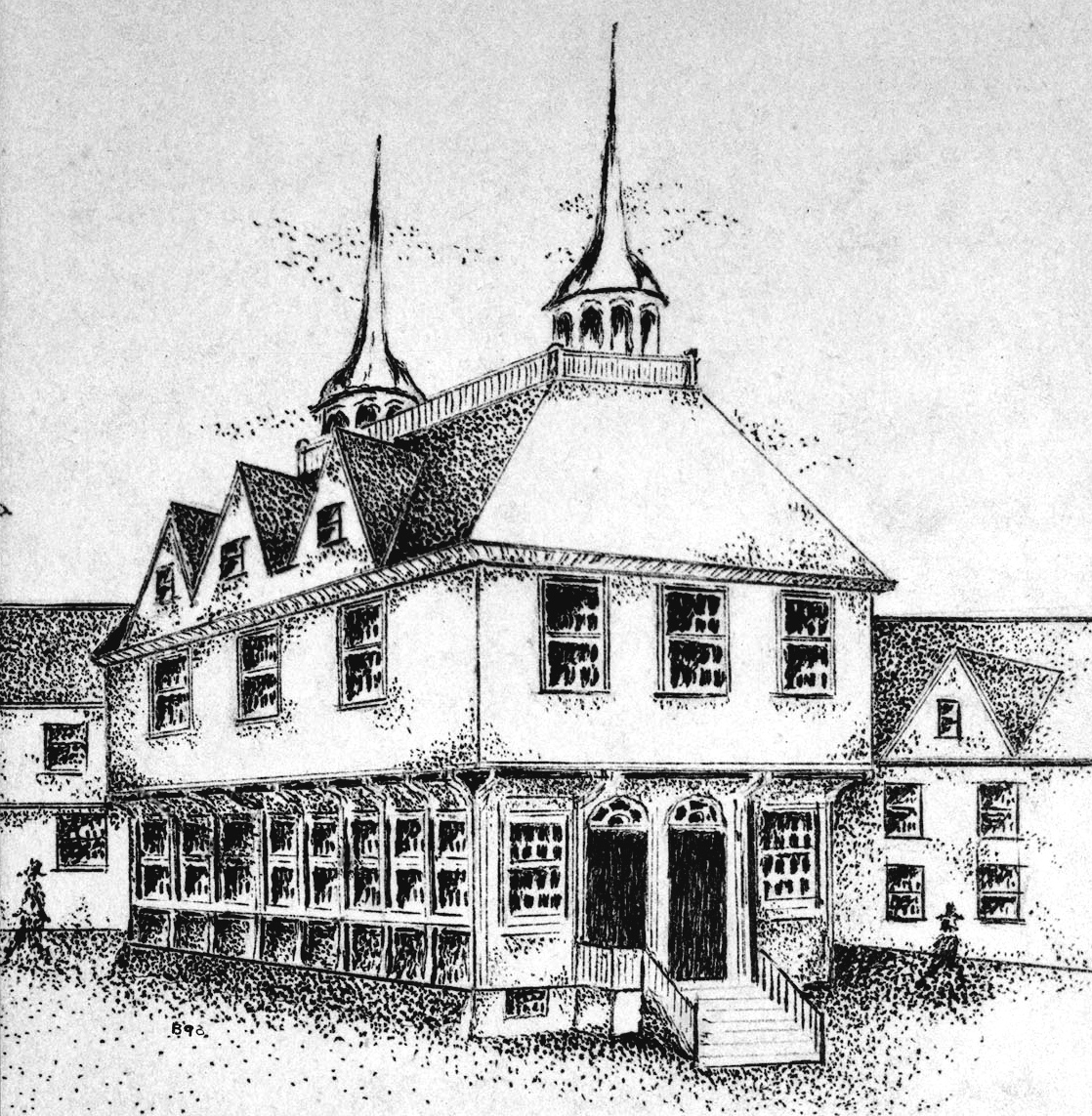
The First Town-House in Boston, where the AHAC met.

As the settlements which followed the landing at Plymouth increased and spread, there was no organized military force for protection — only local volunteer companies, which lacked the capacity for joint action or any centralized authority. The English Government had no standing army, with the only permanent force (other than Royal bodyguards) being the locally organised Militia, in which all able males between 16 and 60 were liable to serve as required for home defence. This part-time force was extended to the New World colonies following the settlement of Virginia in 1607 and its offshoot Bermuda in 1609–1612, and to other colonies as they were established. Many of the settlers of Boston had been members in England of the Honourable Artillery Company (HAC) of London, and the military training they had received in that company led them to form a similar organization in the new country. In 1637 the company was formed as a citizen militia for instruction in military discipline and tactics. Robert Keayne and many of the original members of the Ancient and Honorable Artillery Company had been members of the original HAC of London.

Governor Winthrop granted a charter on March 13, 1638, and on the first Monday in June following, an election of officers was held on Boston Common. The original name of the company was "The Military Company of Massachusetts". It began to be referred to as "The Ancient and Honorable Artillery Company" in the year 1737.

Among the charter members was Nicholas Upsall, who later forsook his membership to join the Quakers. Since that time, the company has continued to hold their annual elections on the Boston Common on the first Monday in June by casting their votes on a drum head. Company membership has long been considered a distinction among the New England gentry in a similar manner to which regimental membership conferred distinction on the sons of the English gentry. The Honourable Artillery Company of London and the Ancient and Honorable Artillery Company of Massachusetts acknowledge and celebrate their common historical roots.

Since 1746, the headquarters of the company has been located in Faneuil Hall. In this armory, the company maintains a military museum with free admission and library containing relics from every war the United States has fought since its settlement. The armory is open to the public daily.

Prior to 1913, the Company served as the de facto officer school for the Massachusetts Militia. (Although not all officers in the Massachusetts Militia were selected from members of the company.) In 1913, the Massachusetts Militia established the Training School for officer training. This school was later renamed the Massachusetts Military Academy and is today designated the 101st Regiment — Regional Training Institute (RTI).

The company reenacts the election of officers every 1st Monday in June (June Day Parade). A parade consisting of the AHAC, Massachusetts National Guard (MANG), members of the USS Constitution, Washington Light Infantry (South Carolina), and other historic military groups from across New England participate in the parade from Faneuil Hall to Boston Common. On occasion, members of the Honorable Artillery Company of London participate. A representative of the Swiss Guard may also be in attendance. Upon the arrival of the Governor of the Commonwealth of Massachusetts, the MANG will fire a cannon volley. During the reenactment ceremony, the Governor will accept resignations of the Captain Commanding, and 1st and 2nd Lieutenants. New commissions will be issued by the Governor.

== Membership ==
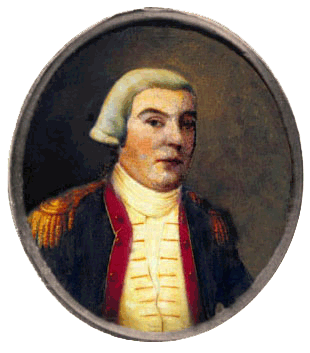
Colonel Thomas Crafts Jr., a member of the AHAC

Membership in the company has traditionally been selected from the upper middle and upper classes of Boston society. In recent decades membership has been expanded to include those from outside of Massachusetts. It is common for senior officers in the Massachusetts National Guard to be members of the company. Although prior military service is not a requirement for membership, about one third of the current (2014) members of the Company have served in the Armed Forces of the United States, in most cases as commissioned officers.

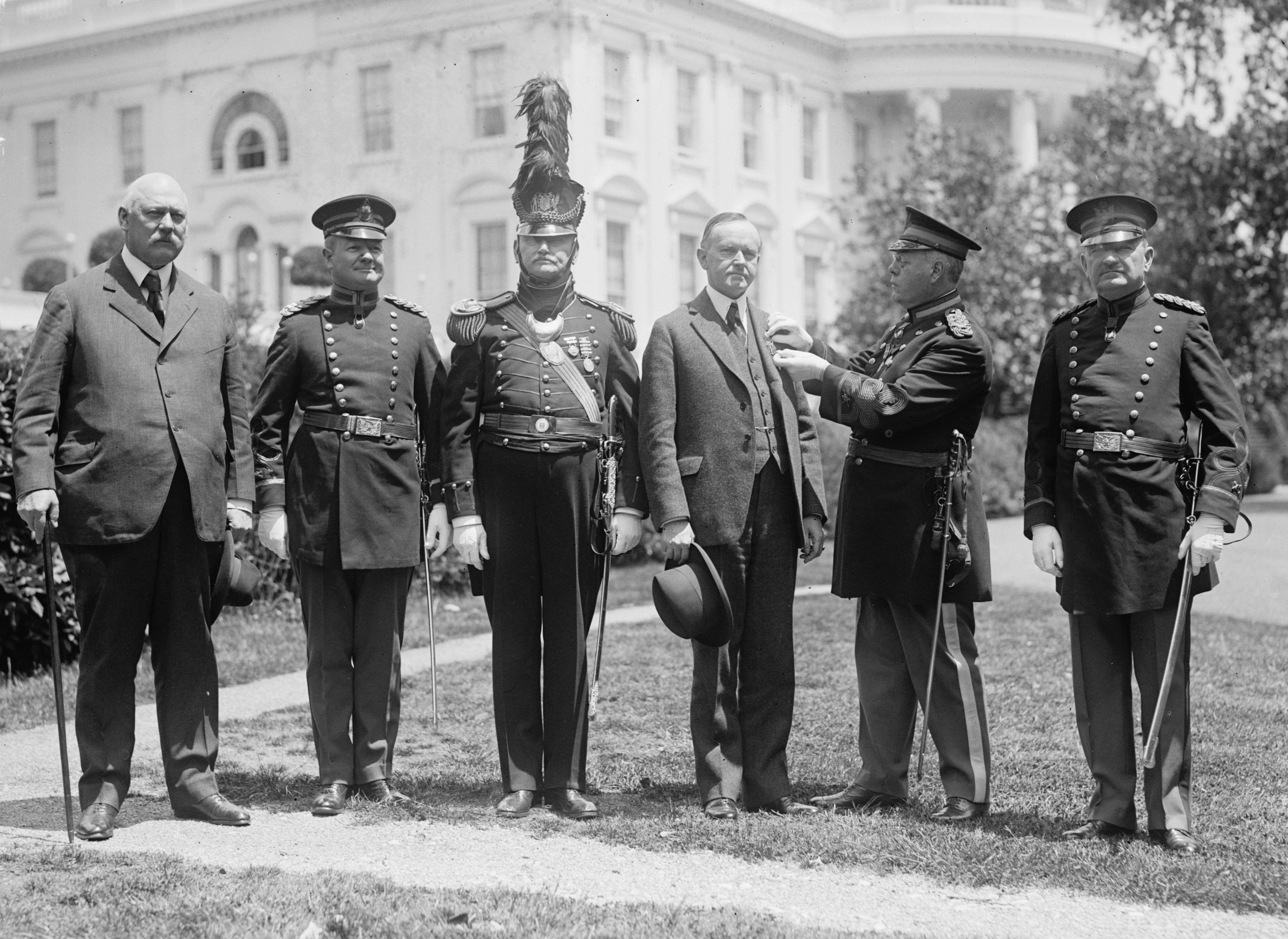
President Calvin Coolidge with members of the Company in 1924.

Prior to the late 20th Century, the membership of the company was almost exclusively Anglo-Americans. In recent decades, however, the company has recruited a more diverse membership.

Most individuals who join the company are elected as Regular Members. After serving in the company for a prescribed period of time, Regular Members become Life Members.

Individuals who are descendants of members of the Company who joined prior to 1738 may join as members by right of descent. Members by Right of Descent have discounted membership fees but may not vote or hold office in the company. Members by Right of Descent residing in New England are enrolled as full (regular) members and pay full dues. In rare cases, honorary membership is extended to highly distinguished individuals. Right of Descent membership qualifies the Ancient and Honorable Artillery Company to be listed as a member organization of the Hereditary Society Community of the United States of America, where it maintains its position as the oldest American lineage society in existence.

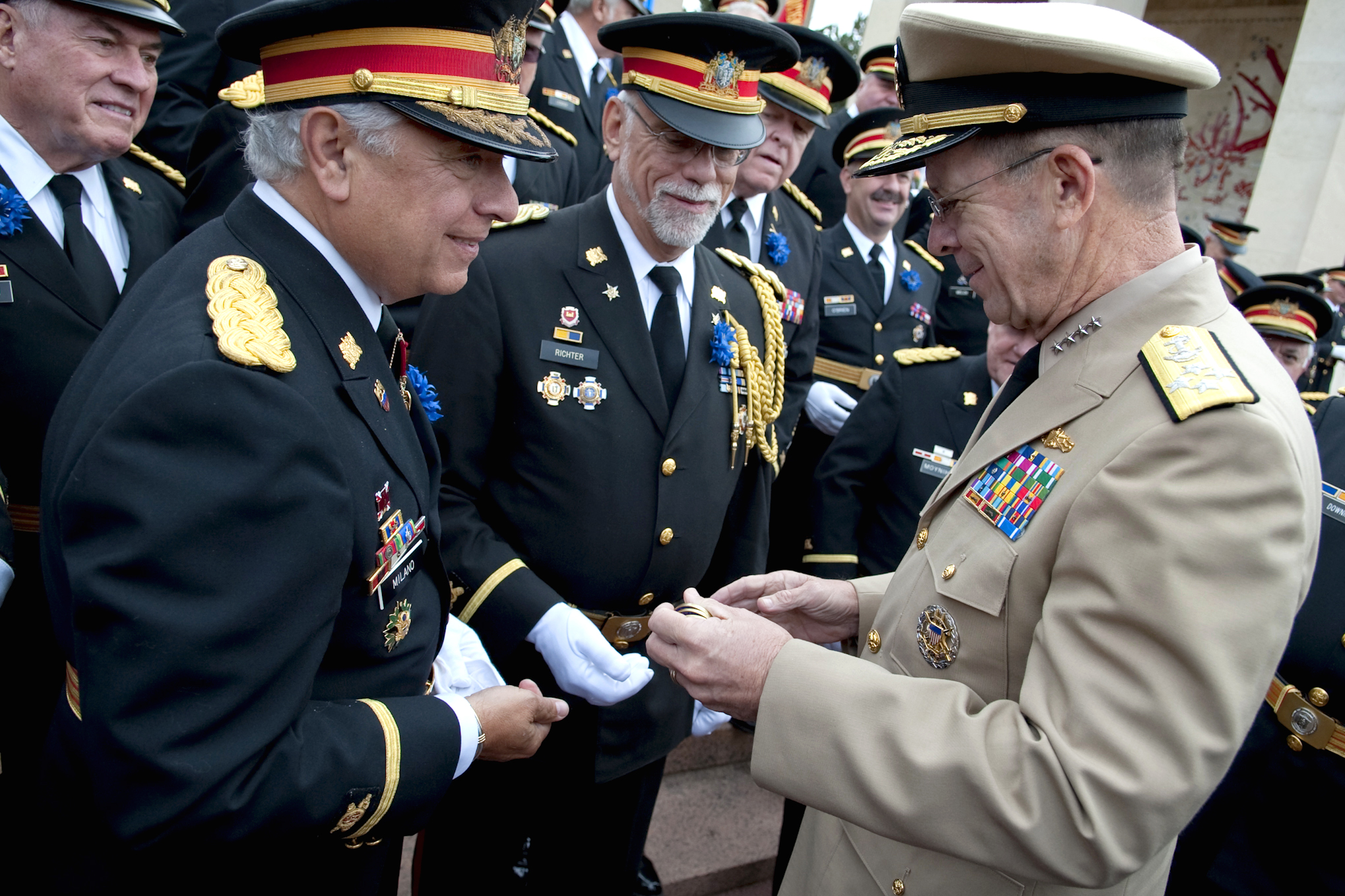
Members of the Company with U.S. Navy Adm. Mike Mullen, Chairman of the Joint Chiefs of Staff, in Normandy, France, 2009

Ancient and Honorable Artillery Company members have served in King Philip's War, King William's War, Queen Anne's War, King George's War, the French and Indian War, the Revolutionary War, the War of 1812, the Mexican War, the Civil War, World War I, World War II, the Korean War, the Vietnam War, the Gulf War, the Iraq War and Operation Enduring Freedom in Afghanistan.

The company has had ten members who were awarded the Medal of Honor (three of whom are still living), and has also had four members who served as President of the United States: Presidents James Monroe, Chester A. Arthur, Calvin Coolidge and John F. Kennedy. Honorary membership was also extended to Prince Albert, King Edward VII and King George V. A number of governors of Massachusetts have also been members of the company.

In 2012, the organization voted to induct its first woman members. Lieutenant Colonel Catherine M. Corkery and Colonel Christine Hoffmann, both officers in the Massachusetts National Guard, were inducted into the organization on September 17, 2012.

== Noteworthy members ==
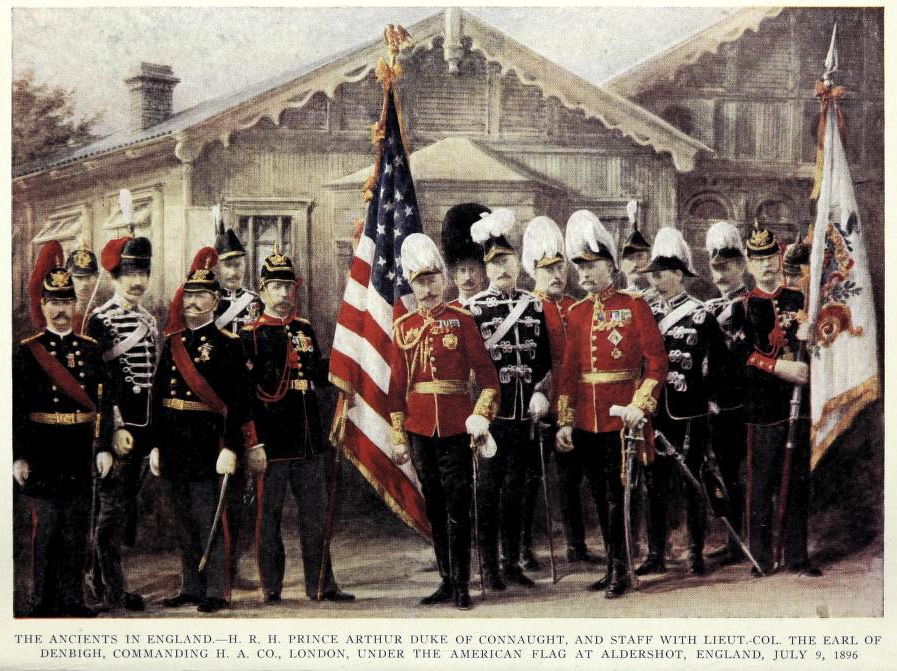
The Company with Prince Arthur, Duke of Connaught in Aldershot, England, 1896.

=== Presidents of the United States ===
- Lieutenant Colonel James Monroe, Continental Army
- Brigadier General Chester A. Arthur, NYM
- Calvin Coolidge
- Lieutenant John F. Kennedy, USNR

=== Vice President of the United States and Nobel Peace Prize Recipient ===
- Brigadier General Charles G. Dawes

=== Medal of Honor recipients ===
- Colonel Harvey C. Barnum, USMC
- Captain George L. Street III, USN
- Captain Thomas Hudner, USN
- Captain Thomas G. Kelley, USN
- Lieutenant Colonel Francis S. Hesseltine, USV
- Brevet Major George H. Maynard, USV
- Captain Jacklyn Harold Lucas, USAR
- 1st Lieutenant Gardner C. Hawkins, USA
- Staff Sergeant Ryan Pitts, USA
- Sergeant Charles A. MacGillivary, USA
- Corporal Lowell M. Maxham, USV

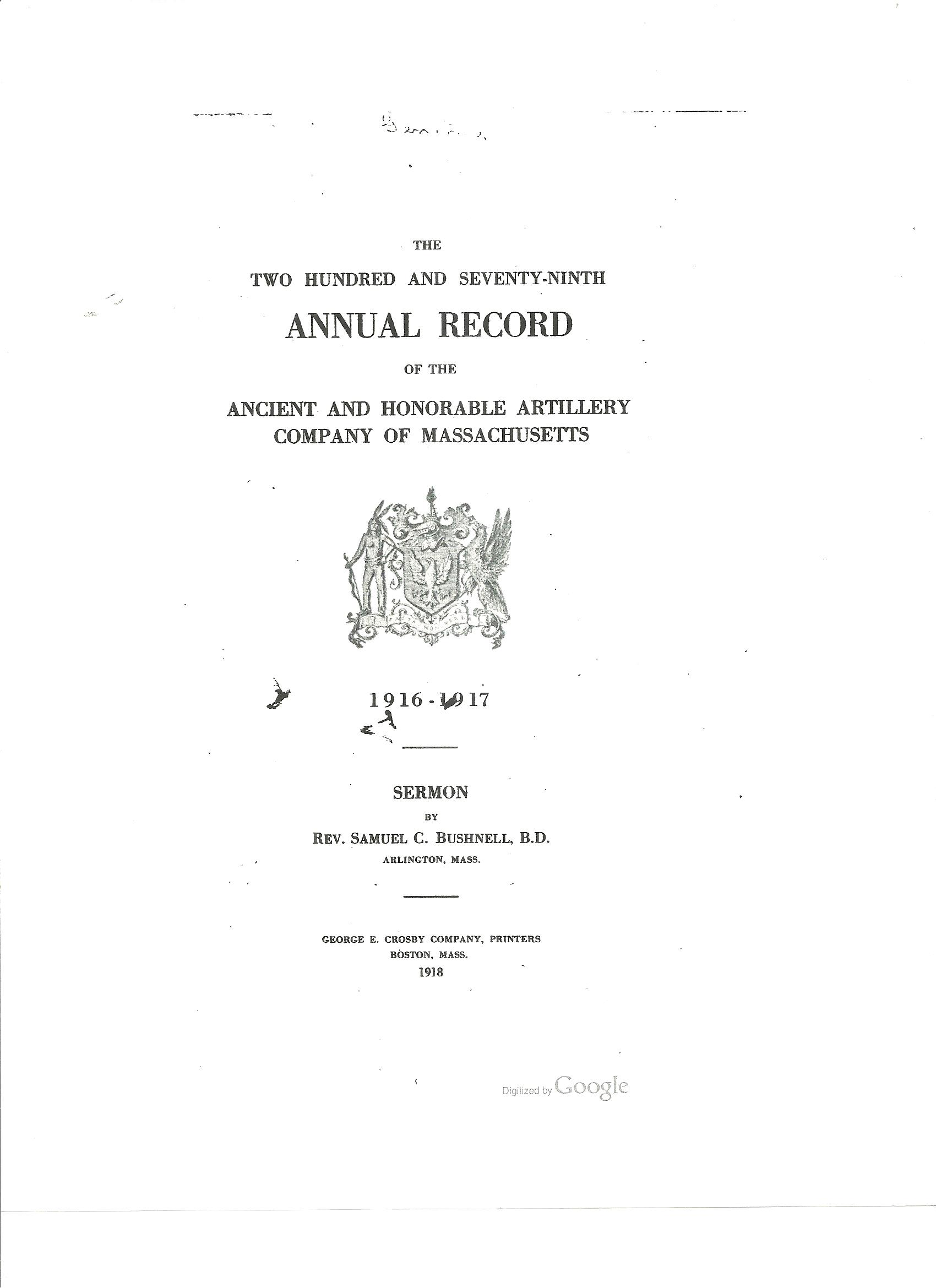
279th Annual Record of the AHAC published in 1918-showing the AHAC Coat of Arms and motto

=== Governors of Massachusetts ===
- Captain Samuel Turell Armstrong – Lieutenant Governor and Mayor of Boston
- Major General Nathaniel Banks – U.S. Representative
- George S. Boutwell
- Robert Bradford
- Major General John Brooks – Revolutionary War veteran, general in the United States Army and Massachusetts Militia
- Major General Benjamin Butler – U.S. Representative
- Calvin Coolidge - President of the United States
- James Michael Curley – Legendary Mayor of Boston and U.S. Representative
- Joseph Dudley
- William Dummer – Philanthropist and founder of Dummer Academy
- Edward Everett – U.S. Secretary of State and U.S. Senator
- Christian Herter – U.S. Secretary of State
- Major General John Leverett – Commander of the Massachusetts Militia and captain of the company.
- Major Levi Lincoln – U.S. Representative
- John D. Long (honorary member) – Secretary of the Navy
- Leverett Saltonstall – U.S. Senator
- Caleb Strong
- Maurice J. Tobin – Mayor of Boston and U.S. Secretary of Labor
- John A. Volpe – U.S. Secretary of Transportation and U.S. Ambassador to Italy

=== Public officials ===
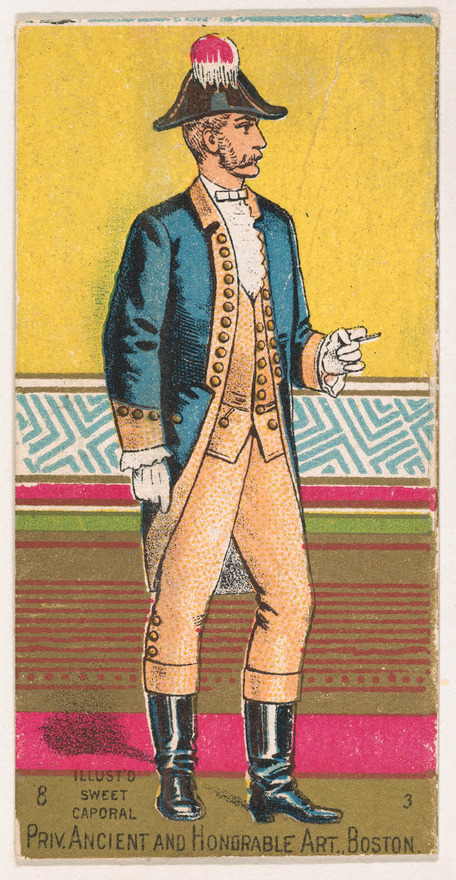
Private of the Ancient and Honorable Artillery, 1888 lithograph card

- Captain Edward Johnson - Founding member of the Ancient and Honorable Artillery Company, "Father of Woburn, Massachusetts"
- Captain John Hull - Treasurer and mintmaster of the Massachusetts Bay Colony.
- Major General Benjamin Lincoln – 1st Continental States Secretary of War; Lieutenant Governor of Massachusetts
- Captain Josiah Quincy Jr. – Mayor of Boston
- Major General Henry A. S. Dearborn – U.S. Representative
- Colonel Samuel C. Lawrence – Mayor of Medford, Massachusetts and Masonic Grand Master of Massachusetts
- Brigadier General Augustus Pearl Martin – Civil War colonel and Mayor of Boston
- Major General Ebenezer Mattoon – U.S. Representative and officer in the American Revolution
- Major General George B. McClellan – Civil War general and governor of New Jersey
- Henry F. Naphen – U.S. Representative
- Samuel L. Powers – U.S. Representative
- Major Samuel Sewall, 2nd – Chief Justice of the Massachusetts Superior Court of Judicature
- Captain William Tailer – Lieutenant Governor of Massachusetts
- George Washington Warren – Mayor of Charlestown, Massachusetts
- Thomas L. Winthrop – Lieutenant Governor of Massachusetts
- Major General Wait Winthrop – Chief Justice of the Massachusetts Superior Court
- James E. Hagan- 21st Mayor of Somerville

=== Others ===
- William Aspinwall – Colonist
- Major General Humphrey Atherton
- Lieutenant Colonel Thomas Dawes
- Major General Daniel Denison
- Major General William Heath – Continental Army general during the American Revolution
- Brigadier General William Hull – General in the War of 1812
- Captain Edward Hutchinson – Captain in 1657; officer who died in King Philip's War
- Captain Isaac Johnson – Killed at the Great Swamp Fight
- Captain Robert Keayne – First commander of the Company
- Major General John Leverett
- Lieutenant John Leverett the Younger – President of Harvard College
- Captain John Nelson
- Major Thomas Savage – 5 time commander of the Company
- General Gordon Sullivan - Chief of Staff of the United States Army
- Colonel Samuel Thaxter – An early commander of Ancient and Honorable Artillery Company and grandfather of Major General Benjamin Lincoln
- Brevet Brigadier General William S. Tilton
- Brevet Brigadier General Stephen Minot Weld Jr.
- Colonel Edward Winslow - Early American silversmith

== See also ==
- Massachusetts Naval Militia
- Massachusetts State Defense Force
- Massachusetts Wing Civil Air Patrol
- National Lancers
- First Corps of Cadets (Massachusetts)
