= Gardner C. Hawkins =

American Civil War Medal of Honor recipient (1846–1913)

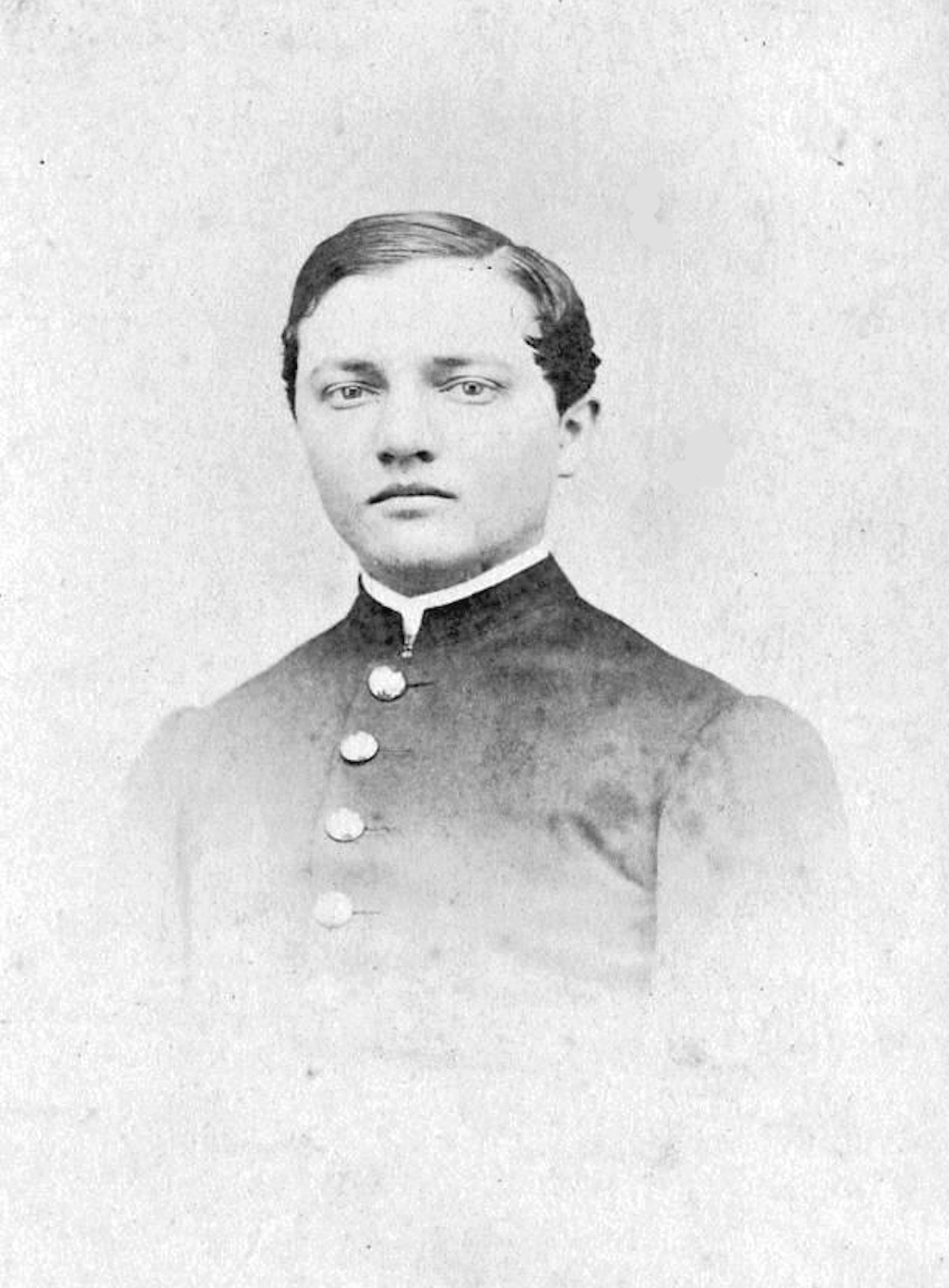
- Born: February 11, 1846; Pomfret, Vermont, US
- Died: December 15, 1913 (aged 67); Winthrop, Massachusetts, US
- Burial place: Stoneham, Massachusetts, US
- Military career
- Allegiance: United States
- Branch: United States Army
- Rank: First Lieutenant
- Units: Company D, 3rd Vermont Volunteer Infantry Regiment
- Conflicts: American Civil War
- Awards: Medal of Honor

Gardner C. Hawkins (February 11, 1846 – December 15, 1913) was a Union Army soldier in the American Civil War who received the U.S. military's highest decoration, the Medal of Honor.

Hawkins was born in Pomfret, Vermont and entered service at Woodstock, Vermont. He was awarded the Medal of Honor for extraordinary heroism on April 2, 1865, while serving as a First Lieutenant with Company D, 3rd Vermont Infantry Regiment, at Petersburg, Virginia. His Medal of Honor was issued on September 30, 1893.

He was a member of the Ancient and Honorable Artillery Company of Massachusetts.

He died at the age of 67 and was buried at the Lindenwood Cemetery in Stoneham, Massachusetts.

== Medal of Honor citation ==
The President of the United States of America, in the name of Congress, takes pleasure in presenting the Medal of Honor to First Lieutenant (Infantry) Gardner C. Hawkins, United States Army, for extraordinary heroism on 2 April 1865, while serving with Company D, 3d Vermont Infantry, in action at Petersburg, Virginia. When the lines were wavering from the well-directed fire of the enemy, First Lieutenant Hawkins, acting adjutant of the regiment, sprang forward, and with encouraging words cheered the soldiers on and, although dangerously wounded, refused to leave the field until the enemy's works were taken.

== See also ==
- Third Battle of Petersburg, Virginia
- 3rd Vermont Volunteer Infantry Regiment
- Siege of Petersburg
