= William Scott (The Sleeping Sentinel) =

American Union Army soldier

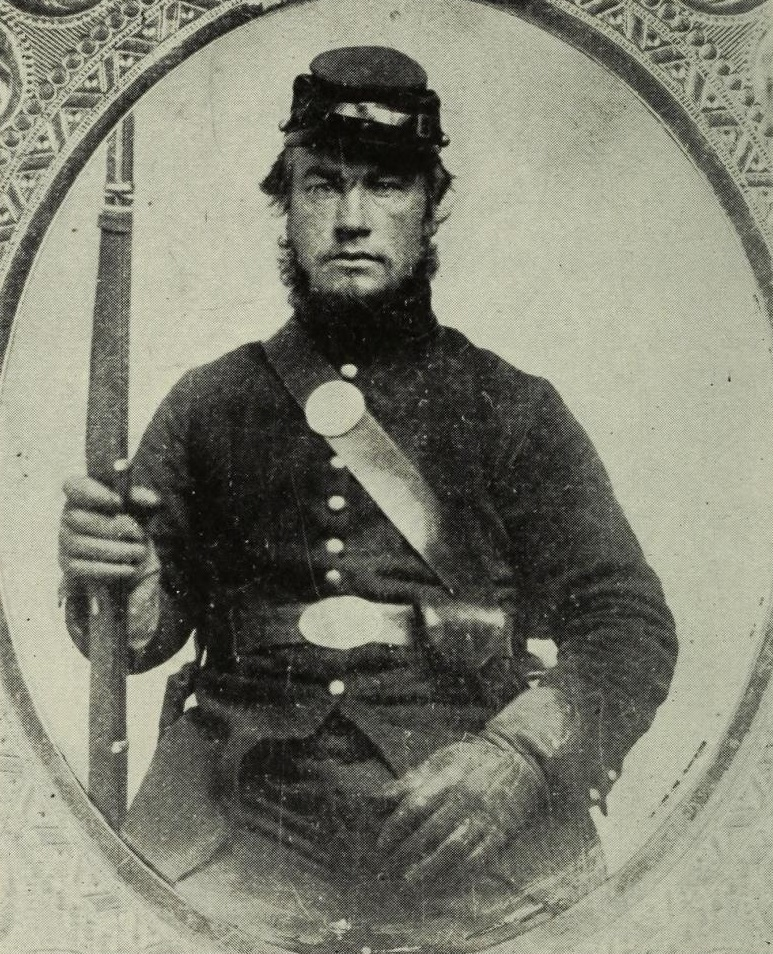
- Scott in 1861
- Born: April 6, 1839; Groton, Vermont, U.S.
- Died: April 17, 1862 (aged 23); Yorktown, Virginia, U.S.
- Burial place: Yorktown National Cemetery
- Military career
- Allegiance: United States (Union)
- Branch: United States Army
- Service years: 1861–1862
- Rank: Private
- Units: Company K, 3rd Vermont Infantry
- Conflicts: American Civil War; Battle at Lee's Mills

William Scott (April 6, 1839 – April 17, 1862) was a Union Army soldier during the American Civil War. He was "the Sleeping Sentinel" who, after being sentenced to be executed, was pardoned by Abraham Lincoln. Scott was later killed in action. He was memorialized by a poem and later a 1914 silent film.

== Biography ==
Scott was born in Groton, Vermont, on April 6, 1839, the son of Thomas Scott and Mary (Wormwood) Scott. He attended the local schools of the West Groton neighborhood, and worked on his family farm.

He joined Company K, 3rd Vermont Infantry, a company of militia from nearby St. Johnsbury.

When his regiment was activated for three years of federal service, Scott's company initially performed sentry duty in and around Washington, D.C. While on guard duty near the Chain Bridge on August 31, 1861, Scott was found asleep at his post. He was subsequently court-martialed, and sentenced to be executed. In Scott's defense, he had volunteered to take the place of a sick comrade the night before and was himself exhausted. These facts were known to the court at the time and figured prominently in newspaper reports, appeals by his superiors for clemency, and his subsequent reprieve. On September 9, Scott was scheduled to be executed. During the proceedings, after the death sentence had been read, a pardon was read, sparing his life.

Scott served faithfully with his regiment until the Battle at Lee's Mills where he was mortally wounded charging the "rifle pits". He was eventually interred at Yorktown National Cemetery in Yorktown, Virginia. Newspapers of the team reported the death of the "famous" sleeping Sentinel and reported that he fell and was initially buried on the same spot as a Revolutionary War soldier as evidenced by buttons and a belt buckle turned up as the grave was dug.

== The pardon ==
Lucius E. Chittenden, a Vermonter serving as Register of the Treasury, was credited with bringing the matter of Scott's court martial to the attention of President Lincoln after he had been asked to do so by several Vermonters serving in the Army. Lincoln agreed with Chittenden's request to pardon Scott, and interceded with General George B. McClellan. McClellan's pardon of Scott read:

HEADQUARTERS OF THE ARMY OF THE POTOMAC

Washington, September 8.

Private William Scott, of Company K. of the Third regiment of Vermont volunteers, having been found guilty by court martial of sleeping on his post while a sentinel on picket guard, has been sentenced to be shot, and the sentence has been approved and ordered to be executed. The commanding officers of the brigade, the regiment and the company, of the command, together with many other privates and officers of his regiment, have earnestly appealed to the Major-General commanding, to spare the life of the offender, and the President of the United States has expressed a wish that as this is the first condemnation to death in this army for this crime, mercy may be extended to the criminal. This fact, viewed in connection with the inexperience of the condemned as a soldier, his previous good conduct and general good character, and the urgent entreaties made in his behalf, have determined the Major-General commanding to grant the pardon so earnestly prayed for. This act of clemency must not be understood as affording a precedent for any future case. The duty of a sentinel is of such a nature, that its neglect by sleeping upon or deserting his post may endanger the safety of a command, or even of the whole army, and all nations affix to the offence the penalty of death. Private William Scott of Co. K. of the Third regiment of Vermont volunteers, will be released from confinement and returned to duty.

By command of Maj.-General McClellan,

S. WILLIAMS, Asst. Adjt.-General.

== Investigating his life and death ==
Several historians have researched the story of Scott's conviction, pardon and subsequent death during battle.

Carl Sandburg debunked reports of Scott's alleged dramatic last words—a wish for Lincoln to be told that Scott's conduct had justified Lincoln's pardon, and a prayer for Lincoln's continued well being—as being highly improbable. According to contemporary records, Scott was mortally wounded by as many as five or six bullets, was in a coma before his death, and could not have uttered anything coherent.

Sandburg also debunked dramatic accounts that had Lincoln riding into McClellan's camp to personally deliver Scott's pardon moments before the scheduled execution.

Sandburg indicated that Lincoln had not been personally aware of Scott's case. However, research in the 1990s indicated that Lincoln was indeed personally aware of the situation and did in fact intervene on Scott's behalf.

== In popular media ==
Scott was portrayed in film in The Reprieve: An Episode in the Life of Abraham Lincoln in 1908, in Abraham Lincoln's Clemency in 1910, and The Sleeping Sentinel in 1914. He was also portrayed by Eddie Sutherland in the feature film The Dramatic Life of Abraham Lincoln (1924).

Artist Horace Pippin painted a fictional scene of Lincoln in a tent pardoning a kneeling Scott in his 1942 painting Abraham Lincoln, the Great Emancipator, Pardons the Sentry. The painting currently hangs in the Museum of Modern Art in New York City.

== Sources ==
- Sandburg, Carl. Abraham Lincoln: The War Years in Four Volumes. New York: Harcourt, Brace & Company, 1936. 1939 edition.
