= Thomas O. Seaver =

American lawyer (1833–1912)

Thomas Orville Seaver
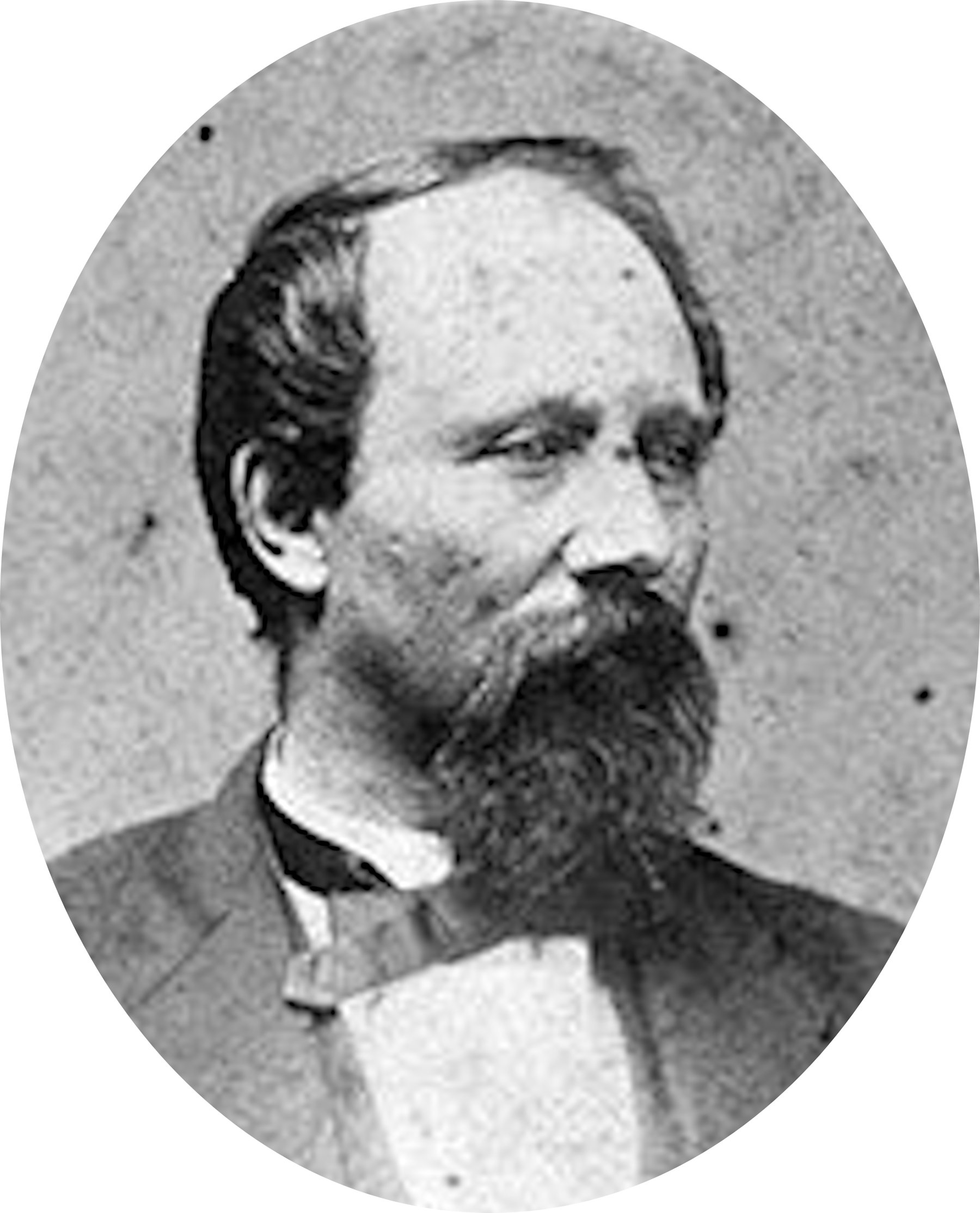
- Seaver, c.1875
- Born: December 23, 1833; Cavendish, Vermont, US
- Died: July 11, 1912 (aged 78); Woodstock, Vermont, US
- Burial place: River Street Cemetery Windsor County, Vermont
- Military career
- Allegiance: United States of America; Union
- Branch: United States Army; Union Army; Vermont Militia
- Service years: 1861–1864 (Army); 1864–1865 (Militia)
- Rank: Colonel (Army); Brigadier General (Militia)
- Commands: 3rd Vermont Infantry (Army); 3rd Brigade, 1st Division (Militia)
- Conflicts: American Civil War: Battle of Spotsylvania Court House; Antietam; Gettysburg
- Awards: Medal of Honor

Thomas Orville Seaver (December 23, 1833 – July 11, 1912) rose to the rank of colonel in the U.S. Army during the American Civil War and received the Medal of Honor, America's highest military decoration, for his actions at the Battle of Spotsylvania Court House. After the war Seaver was admitted to the Vermont bar and practiced law, serving as a judge for many years, until his death.

== Biography ==
Seaver was born in Cavendish, Vermont, but after his first year of school his parents moved to Pomfret seeking better educational opportunities for their son. He ultimately attended Green Mountain Academy in South Woodstock, graduating in 1855. He matriculated at Tufts University later that year, where he was admitted to the Zeta Psi fraternity, but left Tufts in 1856 to attend Norwich University, a Vermont military academy. He left Norwich without a degree in 1858, completing his studies at Union College and receiving a B.A. in 1859. On June 30, 1861, he wed Nancy Taylor Johnson Spaulding.

On the outbreak of the Civil War, Seaver mustered on July 16, 1861, in Newbury, where he was given command of a company in the 3rd Vermont Infantry as a captain, serving until July 1864. He eventually commanded the regiment, and was promoted to major on August 13, 1861; to lieutenant colonel on September 17, 1862; and to full colonel on January 13, 1863. He served in the Battles at Antietam and Gettysburg, among many others. he was mustered out of the service on May 10, 1864.

After the Confederate St. Albans Raid in October 1864, Vermont's state government reorganized its militia and deployed it to defend against future incursions from Canada. The 1st Division was created, with William Y. W. Ripley in command as a major general; his subordinate brigade commanders, with the rank of brigadier general, included: John L. Barstow (1st Brigade); William W. Grout (2nd Brigade); and Seaver (3rd Brigade).

After the war, Seaver settled in Cavendish once more and began work as an attorney, serving at different times as a public defender and state's attorney; he also held other posts, including state railroad commissioner, county jail commissioner, and town selectman. He was made a judge of the probate court in 1886. He received the Medal of Honor on April 8, 1892, for valor in the Battle of Spotsylvania.

In 1897, Seaver was shot by the party in a divorce case who was upset that he had not received custody of his daughter; the protracted case included the father being found guilty of kidnapping. After being served with a restraining order preventing him from interfering with a temporary guardian's custody of the girl, the father approached Seaver and demanded her return. When Seaver ordered him from the Seaver home, the father shot him. One bullet pierced Seaver's coat sleeve; the other went through his right lung and lodged in his back. He was hospitalized for an extended period, but recovered. The father was convicted of attempted murder in February 1898.

In 1910, Norwich University conferred the honorary degree of Master of Arts on Seaver in recognition of his accomplishments as a soldier and a judge.

He died in Woodstock in 1912 from a heart attack and was buried at River Street Cemetery in Windsor County, Vermont. He was survived by his wife Nancy and two children, a girl and a boy (two daughters had predeceased him).

== Medal of Honor citation ==

Rank and Organization:

Colonel, 3d Vermont Infantry. Place and date: At Spotsylvania Courthouse, Va., May 10, 1864. Entered service at: Pomfret, Vt. Born: December 23, 1833, Cavendish, Vt. Date of issue: April 8, 1892.

Citation:

At the head of 3 regiments and under a most galling fire attacked and occupied the enemy's works.

== See also ==
- List of Medal of Honor recipients
- List of American Civil War Medal of Honor recipients: Q–S
