= Willie Johnston (Medal of Honor) =

American Civil War Medal of Honor recipient (1850–1941)

William J. "Willie" Johnston
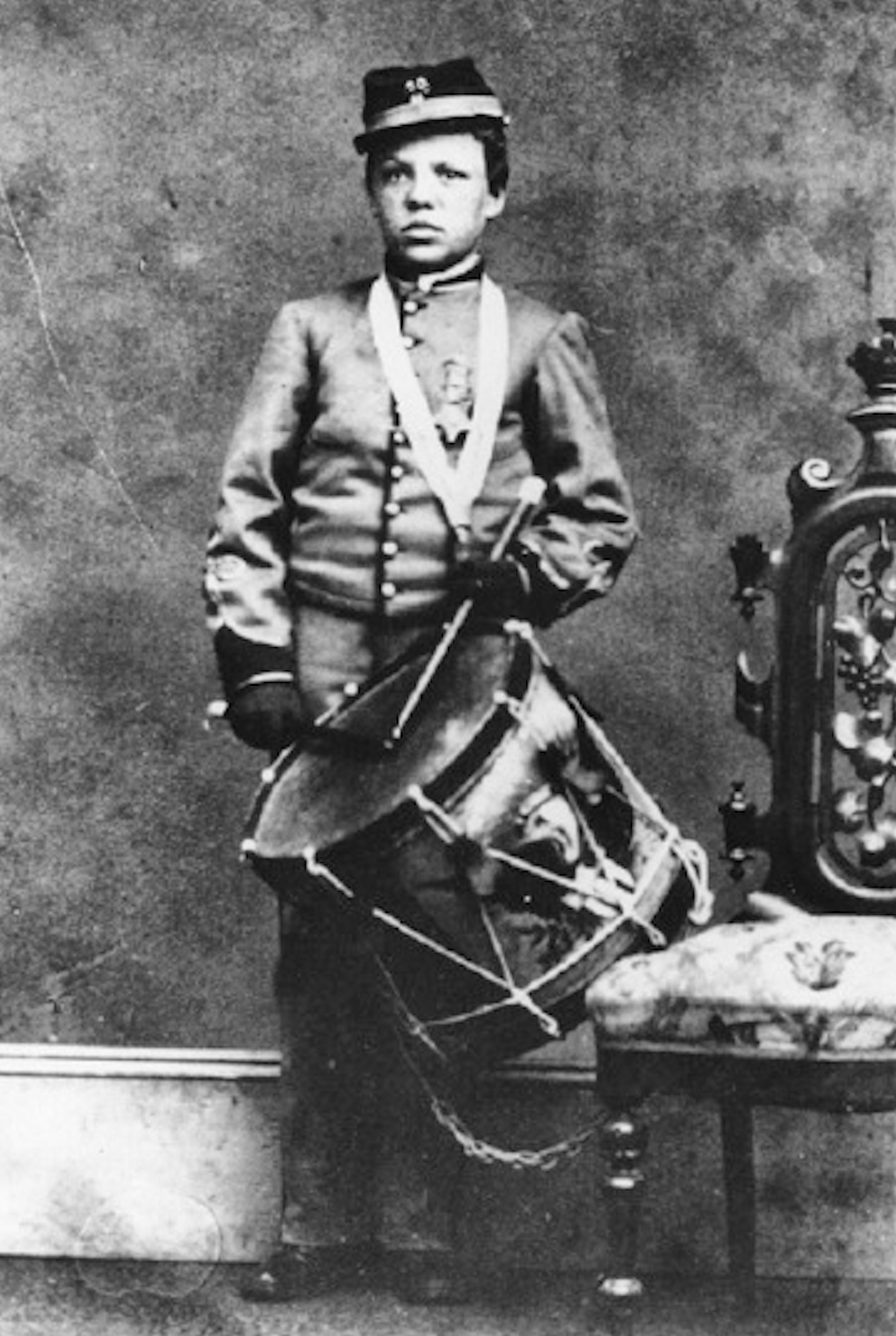
- Johnston in late 1863, shortly after receiving the Medal of Honor
- Born: July 12, 1850; St. Johnsbury, Vermont, US
- Died: September 16, 1941 (aged 91)
- Alma mater: Norwich University (attended)
- Military career
- Allegiance: United States
- Branch: Union Army
- Service years: 1861–1865
- Rank: Musician
- Units: 3rd Vermont Infantry; 20th Regiment, Veteran Reserve Corps
- Conflicts: American Civil War
- Awards: Medal of Honor
- Other work: Machinist, Boston Navy Yard

William J. Johnston (Note: Johnston's name appears in some records with "H" as his middle initial.) (July 12, 1850 – September 16, 1941) was a drummer boy in Company D of the 3rd Vermont Infantry during the American Civil War. When his division was routed during the Seven Days Battles during the Peninsula Campaign of June to July 1862, he was the only drummer to come away with his instrument. His superiors considered this a meritorious feat, given that the regiment's other soldiers had thrown away their guns and equipment to lighten their loads as they retreated. As a result, he received the Medal of Honor in 1863; at age 13, he remains the youngest recipient of the award.

== Early life ==
Johnston (Note: Johnston's name is sometimes incorrectly spelled as "Johnson". His signature and that of his father on various documents indicate that "Johnston" was correct.) was born in Morristown, New York, in July 1850, (Note: The 1850 federal census for Morristown indicates that Johnston was born in December 1849. Information he provided at his 1864 reenlistment indicates that July 1850 is correct. One source provides a date of July 12, 1850.) a son of Eliza and William B. H. Johnston, (Note: William B. H. Johnston later dropped the initial "H" and became known as William B. Johnston.) both natives of England. (Note: Johnston's mother's maiden name is unknown.) His mother died while he was young and the family had moved to Montreal, Canada, by 1853 where his father, a civil engineer, married Thérèse E. Martin at Montreal's St. George Anglican Church. The Johnston family moved to Salem, Vermont (now part of Derby) in 1858, where William Johnston either purchased or rented a farm. In the 1860 federal census, William Johnston gave his occupation as innkeeper, with the inn he operated probably being located in nearby Coventry.

== Civil War service ==
=== Enlistment ===
Johnston's father enlisted in the 3rd Vermont Infantry in June 1861 and the regiment mustered at St. Johnsbury on July 16. Willie Johnston was formally enlisted in Company D as a drummer on December 11, 1861, but was originally denied pay, because the regiment's officers thought he was too young. In June 1862, he was approved to receive pay, which was backdated to his December 1861 enlistment. The regiment's rolls at the time of his enlistment list him as 11 years old and five feet tall. His father was a member of Company B, attained the rank of corporal, and served in the regimental color guard.

=== The Peninsula Campaign ===
The 3rd Vermont was assigned to Brooks' 1st Vermont Brigade, Smith's 2nd Division, Keyes' IV Corps, for McClellan's Peninsula Campaign.

The regiment served throughout the Peninsula Campaign in Virginia, including the Seven Days Battles of June 25 to July 1, 1862. These battles resulted in a victory for the Confederates, and on July 1, 1862, Smith's division was posted to positions on Turkey Creek in Charles City County when it began its nighttime withdrawal. During the retreat, many men threw away all their equipment so they would have less weight to carry and could move more quickly, but Johnston kept his drum. The division arrived at Harrison's Landing early on the morning of July 2, with Johnston having brought his drum the whole way. At Harrison's Landing, he had the honor of drumming for the division parade on July 4, since he was the only drummer in the division who had brought his instrument off the battlefield.

=== Post-award service ===
After the Peninsula campaign, Johnston was reported as having been wounded, and was transferred to the Invalid Corps. He served as an attendant at West's Buildings Hospital in Baltimore while assigned to Company 60, 1st Battalion, Invalid Corps, which was later reorganized as Company H, 20th Regiment, Veteran Reserve Corps. While assigned to the VRC, Johnston played in the hospital's band and was appointed as a drum major. Despite some bureaucratic issues with his documentation, Johnston is known to have re-enlisted in the 3rd Vermont at Brandy Station, Virginia, on February 15, 1864. He was mustered out of the service on August 31, 1865.

== Medal of Honor citation ==
Rank and organization: Musician, Company D, 3rd Vermont Infantry. Place and date: Unknown. Entered service at: St. Johnsbury, Vt. Birth: Morristown, N.Y. Date of issue: 16 September 1863.

Citation:

Date and place of act not on record in War Department.

Despite the inability of researchers to locate official documentation about the circumstances of Johnston's Medal of Honor action, the events were covered in contemporary newspaper accounts. According to the October 31, 1863 The Caledonian of St. Johnsbury, which was reprinted in the Independent-Standard (Irasburg, Vermont) for October 31, 1863:

Willie Johnston, 13 years old, a drummer boy in Co. D, 3d Vermont Regiment, has received a medal for his heroic conduct in the seven days fight before Richmond. On the retreat, when strong men threw away their guns, knapsacks and blankets that they might have less weight to carry, this little fellow kept his drum and brought it safely to Harrison's Landing, where he had the honor of drumming for division parade, he being the only drummer who brought his drum from the field."

The Caledonian story credits the division commander, General William Farrar Smith, with making the recommendation to recognize Johnston's heroism. In addition, it indicates that Secretary of War Edwin M. Stanton presented the medal at a War Department ceremony. Johnston's personnel file contains a receipt he signed for Stanton's adjutant which acknowledged that Johnston had received his decoration.

In 1916, the Department of War appointed a panel to review awards of the Medal of Honor and determine whether any should be revoked for failing to meet the eligibility criteria. The board reviewed the files on 2,625 awards, including 1,517 presented for action during the Civil War. 911 Medal of Honor awards were revoked, but Johnston's was allowed to stand.

== Post-war years ==
The details of Johnston's early education are not known, but he was definitely proficient with the written English language and other topics; surviving letters about his reenlistment and pay issues were prepared in his handwriting, and though they contain minor spelling errors, they are highly literate, and display a clear grasp of grammar, punctuation, and the ability to communicate detailed information clearly and concisely. He attended Norwich University from 1866 to 1868, but left without graduating. In 1867 Johnston, competed for a position at the United States Military Academy, but was not selected. In the late 1860s, Johnston also played in St. Johnsbury's town band.

He moved to Charlestown, Massachusetts in the late 1860s, where he married Nellie Murphy on March 1, 1870. They were the parents of five children, including Anna Lewis (born 1871), William Henry (born 1872), Mary (born 1874), Charles Cyril (born 1876), and Leo Francis (born 1878). The family lived at 65 Tremont Street and Johnston worked as a machinist.

In May 1888, newspapers reported on the discovery of Johnston's drum, identifiable by a silver commemorative plaque on the back, at a home in Chelsea, Massachusetts. (Note: The plaque was reported on in The Vermont Union (Lyndon, Vermont) for July 12, 1867.) The drum was subsequently turned over to the curator of the Civil War relic room at the Massachusetts State House.

News accounts about Johnston's drum caused newspaper editors in Vermont to attempt to locate Johnston. Johnston's father, by now a resident of Colorado, visited St. Johnsbury later in May and was the source for newspaper stories which indicated that Johnston was a resident of Charlestown before becoming a member of the "naval service," which William Johnston stated had been his son's occupation for several years. United States Navy records for the period do not provide details on "William Johnston" or "William Johnson" that can be conclusively identified as Johnston, raising the possibility that he served under an assumed name or in a support role that would not have required him to be identified on Navy muster or pay rolls, such as continuing to work as a machinist. The State House was later searched, but the drum was not located, and subsequent attempts to find it have been unsuccessful. In 1890, a newspaper account indicated that Johnston's father had requested that the plaque from Johnston's drum be sent to him because Johnston was no longer alive. Johnston was not dead in 1890, as evidenced by the Chelsea city directories for the late 1880s, 1890s, and early 1900s, which listed him as a "mariner" and then a "master mariner" indicating that he pursued a career as a merchant sailor and ship captain.

== Later life ==
In July 1899, Johnston was listed as among the attendees at a Medal of Honor Legion reunion in Burlington, Vermont. His hometown was not noted in the magazine or newspaper articles about the event. He was also known to be alive in 1917 or after, because even though he never applied for the veteran's pension to which he was entitled, or the monthly bonus he was eligible for as a Medal of Honor recipient, his War Department personnel file indicates that in 1917 or perhaps at a later date, he applied for award of the Civil War Campaign Medal, which in 1913 became available to Union Army veterans who applied to receive it. The exact date, his address, and other details are not included in the file.

Some sources indicate that Johnston died at an unknown location on September 16, 1941. However, a valid reference for this information has not been found. Johnston's burial location is unknown, and attempts to locate it have proved unsuccessful.

== Legacy ==
Plaque in Johnston's honor in Harrison's Landing, Virginia in 2012

- In 2007, a statue of Johnston was unveiled at Old Town Newhall's Veterans Memorial Plaza in Santa Clarita, California. The work is dedicated to all U.S. military personnel, past and present.
- The Fairbanks Museum in St. Johnsbury displays Civil War memorabilia, including a photo of Johnston and a set of his drumsticks.
- In June, 2012, a plaque honoring Johnston was placed at Berkeley Plantation, Virginia (Harrison's Landing) by the Vermont Civil War Hemlocks living history organization. The text reads:

"At Harrison's Landing on July 4, 1862, Willie Johnston—age 11, 3rd Vermont Drummer Boy played for Div. review. For keeping his drum during the arduous 7 days battles, he was awarded the Medal of Honor by Sec. of War Stanton. He remains the youngest recipient of the Medal of Honor. His gravesite is unknown. Dedicated June 2012. The Vermont Civil War Hemlocks."

== See also ==
- List of Medal of Honor recipients
