= 3rd Vermont Infantry Regiment =

- Flag of Vermont, 1837–1923
- Active: July 16, 1861 to July 11, 1865
- Disbanded: July 11, 1865
- Allegiance: United States; Union
- Branch: United States Army; Union Army
- Type: Infantry
- Size: 1,748
- Engagements: Battle of Fredericksburg; Battle of Swift Creek; Battle of Drewry's Bluff; Bermuda Hundred Campaign; Battle of Cold Harbor; Siege of Petersburg; Second Battle of Petersburg; Battle of the Crater (reserve); Battle of Chaffin's Farm; Battle of Fair Oaks & Darbytown Road

Commanders
- Colonel: John W. Phelps
- Colonel: William Farrar Smith
- Lieutenant Colonel: Wheelock G. Veazey

Insignia
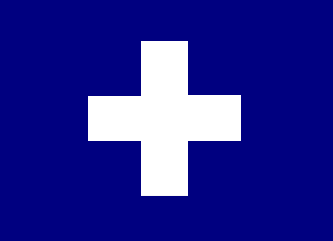
- 2nd Brigade (Vermont Brigade), 2nd Division, VI Corps (Union Army), Army of the Potomac/Army of the Shenandoah (Union)

The 3rd Vermont Infantry Regiment was a three-years infantry regiment in the Union Army during the American Civil War. It served in the eastern theater, predominantly in the VI Corps, Army of the Potomac, from July 1861 to July 1865. It was a member of the Vermont Brigade.

== History ==
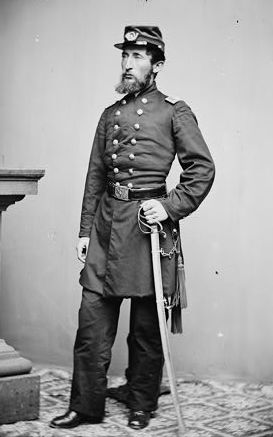
Colonel Breed Noyes Hyde of the 3rd Vermont Infantry

In July 1861, the United States Congress authorized President Abraham Lincoln to call out 500,000 men, to serve for three years unless sooner discharged. The 3rd Vermont Infantry was the second of the three years regiments from the state placed in the field as a result of this call. It was organized from militia companies from Springfield, Coventry, Newbury (Wells River), Charleston, Johnson, Hartford, St.Johnsbury, St. Albans, Guidhall, and East Montpelier and Calais.

Governor Erastus Fairbanks' first choices to command the regiment were Colonel John W. Phelps, (Note: Phelps, born in Guilford, Vermont, a member of the West Point class of 1836, was an artilleryman who had served in the Seminole Wars in Florida, the Mexican–American War, and spent 1857–1859 with the Mormon Expedition. He resigned from the army in 1859 after 23 years. At the beginning of the Civil War, he lived in Brattleboro and he wrote forceful articles pointing out the danger of the constantly increasing political influence of the slave states. For more information, see his Wikipedia article.) soon to relinquish his command of the 1st Vermont Infantry, Captain Truman Seymour, (Note: Seymour, born in Burlington, Vermont, a classmate of George McClellan, Thomas J. "Stonewall" Jackson, Jesse Lee Reno, Darius Couch, George Stoneman, Samuel Sturgis, David Rumph Jones, and George Pickett in the West Point class of 1846, was an artilleryman who had served in the Mexican–American War. After returning to the United States following the war, he became an assistant professor of drawing at West Point from 1850 to 1853 and fought against the Seminoles in Florida from 1856 to 1858. He was promoted to captain on November 22, 1860. n the months that led up to the Civil War Seymour served under Col. John L. Gardner at Fort Moultrie getting it prepared for the imminent war. When the Civil War began in 1861, Seymour commanded an artillery company in the defense against the Confederate assault on Fort Sumter, after which he received the brevet of major. For more information, see his Wikipedia article.) 4th U.S. Artillery, a native Vermonter who had been present at the Confederate attack on Fort Sumter, and Captain A. V. Colburn, U.S. Army, who later became Assistant Adjutant General of the Army of the Potomac under General George B. McClellan. Phelps, however, was serving as commandant of the post at Newport News, Virginia, and the offers to Seymour and Colburn were declined.

The regiment rendezvoused at St. Johnsbury, on the ground of the Caledonia County Agricultural Society at "Camp Baxter," (Note: This property was the county fairgrounds just south of the town.) named in honor of Adjutant and Inspector General H. Henry Baxter. The regiment mustered into United States service on July 16, 1861, (Note: Because the 3rd took longer to organize and fill out, it did not missed the Battle of First Bull Run unlike its future brigade mates.) and departed for Washington, D.C., on July 24, under the temporary command of Lieutenant Colonel Breed N. Hyde. At Hartford, Connecticut, the regiment's commander, Colonel William Farrar Smith, (Note: Smith, known to his friends as "Baldy", was born at St. Albans, Vermont and graduated fourth of 41 the West Point class of 1845. Smith was appointed to the Topographical Engineers Corps. His service in the war would be noted for the extremes of glory and blame, notably success in the Peninsula, Maryland, and Chattanooga campaigns and failure at Fredricksburg and Petersburg. For more information, see his Wikipedia article.) joined them.

The regiment arrived in Washington, D.C., on July 25, 1861, and on July 27, marched up the Potomac to the Chain Bridge, where they built "Camp Lyon." They joined at that site the 6th Maine Infantry, Mott's Battery and a company of cavalry. By August 12, the 2nd Vermont Infantry and the 33rd New York Infantry had joined them.

Major Walter W. Cochran, of Bellows Falls, resigned his commission on August 6 due to a severe attack of fever and ague. Captain Wheelock G. Veazey, of Company A, replaced him. On August 13, Colonel Smith was appointed brigadier general of volunteers, and Hyde replaced him, now as a full colonel. Veazey was promoted to lieutenant colonel, and Captain Thomas O. Seaver, of Company F, was promoted to major.

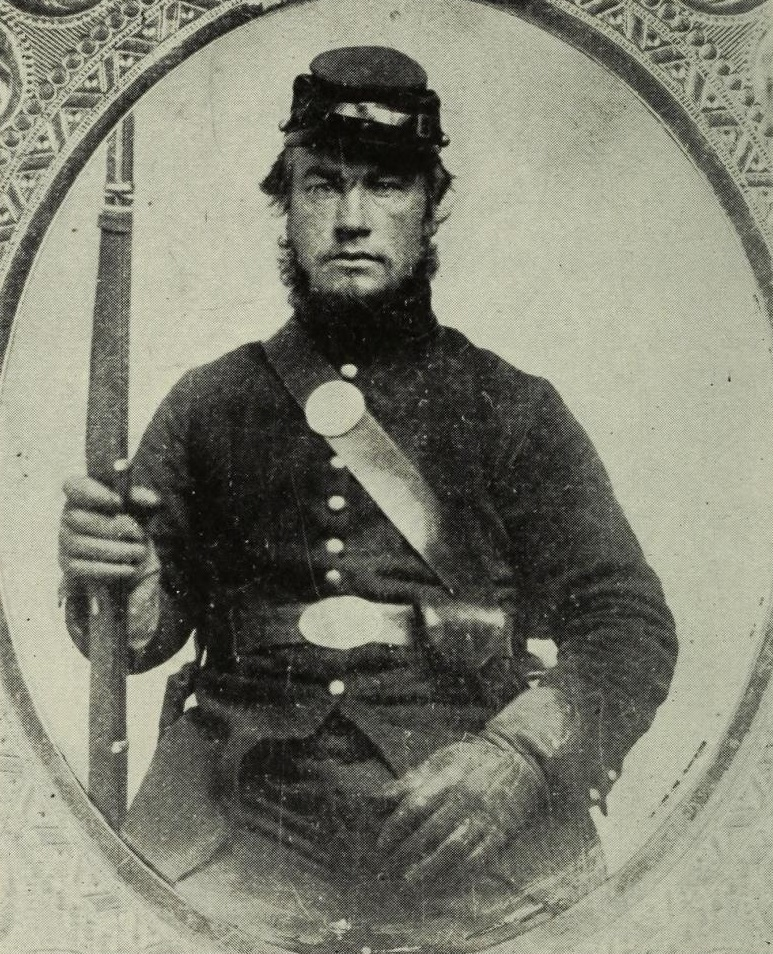
Private William Scott of Groton, Vt., better known as The Sleeping Sentinel.

It was also here that Private William Scott, known to history as the Sleeping Sentinel, was found asleep at his post on August 31, court-martialed, and sentenced to be executed. President Lincoln heard about the case, pardoned Scott, and returned him to his unit. William Scott was actually standing before a firing squad when the death sentence and pardon were both read, however no one had told him that he had been pardoned prior to being sent to the firing squad.

On September 3, the units crossed the Chain Bridge, and occupied "Camp Advance," 1 mile (1.6 km) in advance of the bridge. On September 9, Private Scott was scheduled to be executed, but during the proceedings, after the death sentence had been read, a pardon was read, sparing his life. In 1997, the original court-martial and pardon papers were discovered, and authenticated, bringing to an end the controversy over whether President Lincoln had personally signed the pardon, which it turned out he did. Scott served faithfully with his regiment until the Battle at Lee's Mill, where he was mortally wounded, and was buried in the national cemetery at Yorktown.

On September 11, the regiment participated in a reconnaissance to and beyond Lewinsville, Virginia, where it engaged Confederate skirmishers. Returning to the camp, the regiment came under fire from Rosser's battery. A shell fell within the ranks of Company C, killing Private Amos Meserve, mortally wounding William H. Colburn, and injuring five others. On September 25, the regiment participated in another reconnaissance to Lewinsville, but suffered no casualties. Quartermaster Redfield Proctor resigned from the regiment on this date to accept appointment as Major of the 5th Vermont Infantry.

During the next two weeks, the 4th and 5th Vermont regiments joined Smith's division. On October 9, the Vermont regiments moved to Camp Griffin, about four miles from Chain Bridge. Here, on October 24, the 6th Vermont Infantry arrived, completing the initial organization of the "Old Vermont Brigade."

The history of the regiment from this point on is essentially that of the Vermont Brigade.

The original members of the regiment, who did not reenlist, were mustered out of the service on July 27, 1864. Veterans and recruits were consolidated into six companies, July 25, 1864. One year recruits and others whose term of service was due to expire prior to October 1, 1865, were mustered out on June 19, 1865. The remaining officers and men mustered out of service on July 11.

== Medal of Honor ==
Six members of the regiment were awarded the Medal of Honor.

- Beattie, Alexander M., Captain, Co. F, " removed, under a hot fire, a wounded member of his command to a place of safety," at the Battle of Cold Harbor, June 5, 1864.
- Hawkins, Gardner C., 1st Lieutenant, Co. E, "when the lines were wavering from the well-directed fire of the enemy, this officer, acting adjutant of the regiment, sprang forward, and with encouraging words cheered the soldiers on and, although dangerously wounded, refused to leave the field until the enemy's works were taken," at the Third Battle of Petersburg, on April 2, 1865.
- Johnston, Willie, Musician Company D, 3rd Vermont Infantry The second Medal of Honor ever awarded.
- Pingree, Samuel E., Captain, Co. F, "gallantly led his Co. across a wide, deep creek, drove the enemy from the rifle pits, which were within 2 yards of the farther bank, and remained at the head of his men until a second time severely wounded," at the Battle at Lee's Mills, April 16, 1862.
- Scott, Julian A., Drummer, Co. E, "crossed the creek under a terrific fire of musketry several times to assist in bringing off the wounded," at the Battle at Lee's Mills, April 16, 1862.
- Seaver, Thomas O., Colonel, while "at the head of 3 regiments and under a most galling fire, attacked and occupied the enemy's works," at the Battle of Spotsylvania, May 10, 1864.

== Affiliations, battle honors, detailed service, and casualties ==
=== Organizational affiliation ===
Its assignments are as follows:

- Attached to Smith's (Note: William Thomas Harbaugh Brooks was an 1841 graduate of West Point, who had seen combat in both the Second Seminole War and the Mexican–American War. He had been on garrison duty at Fort Hamilton, New York when the Southern states seceded. For More information, see his Wikipedia article.) Brigade, Division of the Potomac, to October 1861
- Attached to Brooks' Brigade, Smith's Division, Army of the Potomac (AoP), to March, 1862
- 2nd Brigade, 2nd Division, VI Corps, AoP, to, to July 1864
- 2nd Brigade, 2nd Division, VI Corps, Army of the Shenandoah, Middle Military Division to July 1865.

=== List of battles ===
The official list of battles in which the regiment bore a part:

- Battle of Lewinsville - September 11, 1861
- Battle at Lee's Mill - April 16, 1862
- Battle of Williamsburg - May 5, 1862
- Battle of Garnett's & Golding's Farm - June 26, 1862
- Battle of Savage's Station - June 29, 1862
- Battle of White Oak Swamp - June 30, 1862
- Battle of Crampton's Gap - September 14, 1862
- Battle of Antietam - September 17, 1862
- Battle of Fredericksburg - December 13, 1862
- Battle of Marye's Heights - May 3, 1863
- Battle of Salem Church - May 4, 1863
- Second Battle of Fredericksburg - June 5, 1863
- Battle of Gettysburg - July 3, 1863
- Battle of Funkstown - July 10, 1863
- Second Battle of Rappahannock Station - November 7, 1863
- Battle of the Wilderness - May 5–10, 1864
- Battle of Spotsylvania - May 10–18, 1864
- Battle of Cold Harbor - June 1–12, 1864
- Second Battle of Petersburg - June 18, 1864
- Battle of Reams' Station - June 29, 1864
- Fort Stevens (Washington, D.C.) - July 11, 1864
- Battle of Charlestown - August 21, 1864
- Battle of Opequon (Gilbert's Ford) - September 13, 1864
- Battle of Winchester (Opequon) - September 19, 1864
- Battle of Fisher's Hill - September 21–22, 1864
- Battle of Cedar Creek - October 19, 1864
- Siege of Petersburg - March 25, 1865
- Third Battle of Petersburg - April 2, 1865

=== Detailed Service ===
The 3rd Vermont's detailed service is as follows

==== 1861 ====
- Left state for Washington DC, July 24
- Arrived in Washington, July 26
- Duty at Georgetown Heights and at Camp Griffin, defences of Washington, till March 10, 1862.
- Skirmish at Lewinsville September 11, 1861.
- Reconnaissance to Lewinsville September 25.

==== 1862 ====
- Moved to Alexandria, VA, March 10, 1862
- Moved to Fortress Monroe VA, March 23–24.
- Action at Young's Mill April 4.
- Siege of Yorktown April 5-May 4.
- Lee's Mills April 16.
- Battle of Williamsburg May 5.
- Seven Days before Richmond June 25-July 1.
  - Garnett's Farm June 27.
  - Savage Station June 29.
  - White Oak Swamp Bridge June 30.
  - Malvern Hill July 1.
- At Harrison's Landing till August 16.
- Moved to Fortress Monroe, thence to Alexandria August 16–24.
- Maryland Campaign September–October 1862.
  - Crampton's Pass September 14.
  - Battle of Antietam September 16–17.
- At Hagerstown, MD, September 26 to October 29.
- Movement to Falmouth, VA October 29-November 19.
- Battle of Fredericksburg December 12–15.

==== 1863 ====
- Burnside's Second Campaign, "Mud March," January 20–24, 1863.
- Chancellorsville Campaign April 27-May 6.
  - Operations at Franklin's Crossing April 29-May 6.
  - Maryes Heights, Fredericksburg. May 3.
  - Salem Heights May 3–4.
  - Banks' Ford May 4.
- Franklin's Crossing June 5–13.
- Battle of Gettysburg. Pa., July 2–4.
- Funkstown, Md., July 10–13.
- Ordered to New York City August 14, and duty there util September 13.
- Moved to Alexandria, thence to Fairfax Court House September 13–17
- Moved to Culpeper Courthouse September 22.
- Bristoe Campaign October 9–22.
- Advance to the Rappahannock November 7–8.
  - Rappahannock Station November 7
- Mine Run Campaign November 26-December 2.

==== 1864 ====
- Overland Campaign May 3 – June 15.
  - Battle of the Wilderness May 5–7.
  - Battle of Spotsylvania Court House May 11–12,
    - "Bloody Angle," Assault on the Salient, May 12.
  - Battle of North Anna May 23–26.
  - Line of the Pamunkey May 26–28.
  - Totopotomoy May 28–31.
  - Battle of Cold Harbor June 1–12.
  - Battle of Jerusalem Plank Road June 22–23.
- Moved to Washington, D. C., July 9–11
- Repulse of Early's attack on Fort Stevens July 11–12
- Non-veterans mustered out July 27, 1864.
- Sheridan's Shenandoah Valley Campaign August 7-November 28
  - Near Charlestown August 21–22
  - Battle of Opequan, Winchester, September 19
  - Fisher's Hill September 22
  - Battle of Cedar Creek October 19
- At Strasburg to November 9
- At Kernstown till December 9
- Moved to Petersburg, December 9–12.

==== 1865 ====
- Siege of Petersburg December 13, 1864, to April 2, 1865.
  - Fort Fisher, before Petersburg, March 25, 1865.
- Appomattox Campaign March 28-April 9.
- Assault on and fall of Petersburg April 2.
- Sailor's Creek April 6.
- Appomattox Court House April 9.
- Surrender of Lee and his army.
- At Farmville and Burkesville Junction till April 23.
- March to Danville April 23–27, and duty there till May 18.
- Moved to Manchester May 18, thence marched to Washington, D. C, May 24-June 2.
- Corps Review June 8.
- Mustered out July 11, 1865.

=== Casualties/Discharges/Promotions ===
During the course of the war, a total of 1,809 men served in the 3rd Vermont Infantry with 881 original recruits and 928 gains from recruiting and transfer. Of that number, the unit lost during its term of service: 196 men were killed and mortally wounded, (Note: 131 KIA, 65 Mortally wounded) 3 died from accident, 11 died in Confederate prisons, and 152 died from disease; for a total loss of 362 men. The 3rd also had 11 men promoted and transferred to other regiments, 474 honorably discharged, 12 dishonorably discharged, 261 deserted, 9 finally unaccounted for, 101 Transferred to Veteran Reserve Corps and other organizations; combined with deaths this meant the regiment lost 868 of their number. During its existence, the regiment had 579 men mustered out at various times, had 428 men wounded but survived to the end of the war, and 78 men were taken as POWs by the Rebels.

== See also ==
- Vermont in the Civil War
- Vermont Brigade
