= George H. Maynard =

American Civil War Medal of Honor recipient

George Henry Maynard
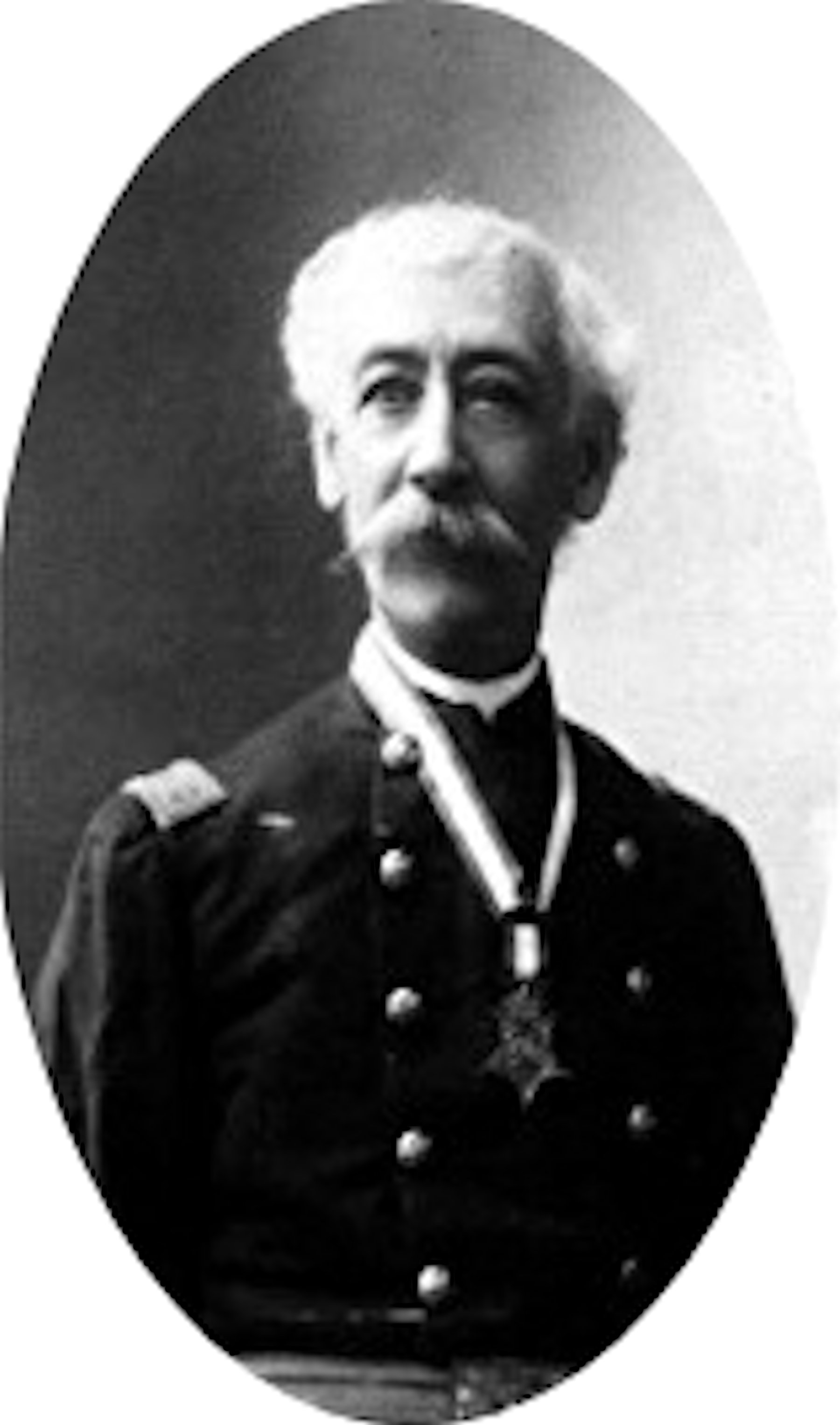
- Maynard in 1895
- Born: February 2, 1836; Waltham, Massachusetts, US
- Died: December 26, 1927 (aged 91); Waltham, Massachusetts, US
- Burial place: Mount Feake Cemetery, Waltham, Massachusetts, US
- Military career
- Allegiance: United States of America; Union
- Branch: United States Army; Union Army
- Rank: Brevet Major
- Units: Company D, 13th Massachusetts Volunteer Infantry Regiment
- Conflicts: American Civil War
- Awards: Medal of Honor

George H. Maynard (February 2, 1836 - December 26, 1927) was a Union Army soldier in the American Civil War who received the U.S. military's highest decoration, the Medal of Honor.

== Early life ==
Maynard was born in Waltham, Massachusetts, on February 2, 1836. He was the son of Warren and Nancy (Holden) Maynard. He attended public schools in Waltham and became a jeweler's apprentice in Boston at the age of 15. He continued in this trade until he enlisted in the Union Army following the outbreak of the Civil War.

== Military service ==
Maynard enlisted as a private in Company D of the 13th Regiment Massachusetts Volunteer Infantry on July 20, 1861. He fought at the Battle of Fredericksburg in Virginia on December 13, 1862. During the battle he ran through enemy fire to rescue another soldier who had been severely wounded in action. He received the Medal of Honor for this action in 1898. He was mustered out of the 13th Massachusetts on February 17, 1863.

On January 17, 1864, he was commissioned a captain in the 82nd United States Colored Infantry. He was breveted to the rank of major on March 15, 1865, for meritorious service during the war. He was honorably mustered out of service on September 10, 1866.

== Later life ==
Maynard married Harriet Elizabeth of Boston on May 5, 1868. They had seven children, four of whom died in childhood and three who died in their early twenties (and only one of whom survived his mother).

He became a member of the Ancient and Honorable Artillery Company of Massachusetts in 1875. He became the first sergeant of the company in 1879. Maynard was an active mason and became a Knight Templar in the York Rite. He was also a companion of the Massachusetts Commandery of the Military Order of the Loyal Legion of the United States.

Maynard died in 1927, at the age of 91 having outlived his wife and all his children and was buried in the Mount Feake Cemetery in Waltham.

== Medal of Honor citation ==
A wounded and helpless comrade, having been left on the skirmish line, this soldier voluntarily returned to the front under a severe fire and carried the wounded man to a place of safety.
