= Henry Knox =

American Founding Father (1750–1806)

- Portrait by Charles Peale Polk after Charles Willson Peale, c. 1785–1800

1st United States Secretary of War
- In office March 8, 1785 – December 31, 1794
- President: George Washington
- Preceded by: Benjamin Lincoln
- Succeeded by: Timothy Pickering

1st Senior Officer of the U.S. Army
- In office December 23, 1783 – June 20, 1784
- Appointed by: Confederation Congress
- Preceded by: George Washington (Commander-in-Chief)
- Succeeded by: John Doughty

Personal details
- Born: July 25, 1750 Boston, Province of Massachusetts Bay, British America
- Died: October 25, 1806 (aged 56) Thomaston, District of Maine, Massachusetts, U.S.
- Resting place: Thomaston Village Cemetery; Thomaston, Maine, U.S.
- Party: Federalist
- Spouse: Lucy Flucker (m. 1774)
- Children: 13
- Relatives: Henry Thatcher (grandson)

Military service
- Allegiance: United States
- Branch/service: Continental Army; United States Army
- Years of service: 1772–1785
- Rank: Major General
- Commands: Chief of Artillery
- Battles/wars: American Revolutionary War; Battle of Bunker Hill; Siege of Boston; Knox Expedition; Fortification of Dorchester Heights; Battle of Long Island; Battle of Trenton; Battle of the Assunpink Creek; Battle of Princeton; Battle of Brandywine; Battle of Germantown; Battle of Monmouth; Siege of Yorktown

Henry Knox (July 25, 1750 – October 25, 1806) was an American military officer, politician, bookseller, and a Founding Father of the United States. Knox, born in Boston, became a senior general of the Continental Army during the Revolutionary War, serving as chief of artillery in all of George Washington's campaigns. Following the war, he oversaw the War Department under the Articles of Confederation from 1785 to 1789. Washington appointed him the nation's first secretary of war, a position which he held from 1789 to 1794. He is well known today as the eponym of Fort Knox in Kentucky, which is often conflated with the adjacent United States Bullion Depository. He was also known for being the first senior officer after George Washington.

Knox was born and raised in Boston where he owned and operated a bookstore, cultivating an interest in military history and joining a local artillery company. He was also on the scene of the 1770 Boston Massacre. He was barely 25 when the Revolutionary War broke out in 1775, but he engineered the transport of what became the "noble train of artillery", British ordnance captured from Fort Ticonderoga in New York, which proved decisive in the British evacuation of Boston in early 1776. Knox quickly rose to become the chief artillery officer of the Continental Army. In this role, he accompanied Washington on all of his campaigns and was engaged in the major actions of the war. He established training centers for artillerymen and manufacturing facilities for weaponry that were valuable assets in winning the war for independence.

Knox saw himself as the embodiment of revolutionary republican ideals. In early 1783, as the war drew to a close, he initiated the concept of the Society of the Cincinnati, authoring its founding document and establishing the organization as a fraternal, hereditary society of veteran officers that survives to this day.

In 1785, the Congress of the Confederation appointed Knox as Secretary of War, where he dealt primarily with Indian affairs. Following the adoption of the United States Constitution in 1789, he became President Washington's Secretary of War. In this role he oversaw the development of coastal fortifications, worked to improve the preparedness of local militia, and directed the nation's military operations in the Northwest Indian War. He was formally responsible for the nation's relationship with the Indian population in the territories that it claimed, articulating a policy which established federal government supremacy over the states in relation to Indian nations and calling for treating Indian nations as sovereign. Knox's idealistic views on the subject were frustrated by ongoing illegal settlements and fraudulent land transfers of Indian lands. He retired to Thomaston, District of Maine, in 1795, where he oversaw the rise of many inventive business ventures built on borrowed money. He died in 1806 just as his financial situation began to reverse.

== Early life and marriage ==
Henry Knox's parents, William and Mary (née Campbell), were Ulster Scots immigrants who emigrated from Derry to Boston in 1729. His father was a shipbuilder who, due to financial reverses, left the family for Sint Eustatius in the West Indies where he died in 1762 of unknown causes.

Henry was admitted to the Boston Latin School, where he studied Greek, Latin, arithmetic, and European history. Since he was the oldest son still at home when his father died, he left school at the age of 9 and became a clerk in a bookstore to support his mother. The shop's owner, Nicholas Bowes, became a surrogate father figure for the boy, allowing him to browse the store's shelves and take home any volume that he wanted to read. The inquisitive future war hero, when he was not running errands, taught himself French, learned some philosophy and advanced mathematics, and devoured tales of ancient warriors and famous battles. He immersed himself in literature while young. However, Knox was also involved in Boston's street gangs, becoming one of the toughest fighters in his neighborhood. Impressed by a military demonstration, at 18, he joined a local artillery company called The Train.

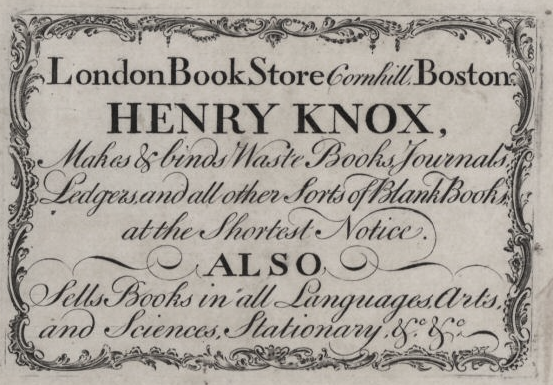
This 1771 advertisement for Knox's shop was engraved by Nathaniel Hurd.

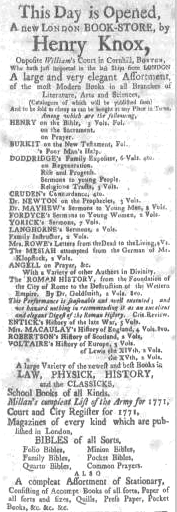
Newspaper advertisement for Knox's bookshop, Boston, 1771

On March 5, 1770, Knox was a witness to the Boston Massacre. According to his affidavit, he attempted to defuse the situation, trying to convince the British soldiers to return to their quarters. He also testified at the trials of the soldiers, in which all but two were acquitted. In 1771 he opened his own bookshop, the London Book Store, in Boston "opposite William's Court in Cornhill." The store was, in the words of a contemporary, a "great resort for the British officers and Tory ladies, who were the ton at that period." Boasting an impressive selection of excellent English products and managed by a friendly proprietor, it quickly became a popular destination for the aristocrats of Boston. As a bookseller, Knox built strong business ties with British suppliers and developed relationships with his customers, but retained his childhood aspirations. Largely self-educated, he stocked books on military science, and also questioned soldiers who frequented his shop in military matters. Knox initially enjoyed reasonable pecuniary success, but his profits slumped after the Boston Port Bill and subsequent citywide boycott of British goods. In 1772 he cofounded the Boston Grenadier Corps as an offshoot of The Train, and served as its second in command. Shortly before his 23rd birthday Knox accidentally discharged a gun, shooting two fingers off his left hand. He managed to bind the wound up and reach a doctor, who sewed the wound up.

Knox supported the Sons of Liberty, an organization of agitators opposed to unpopular policies of the British Parliament. It is unknown if he participated in the 1773 Boston Tea Party, but he did serve on guard duty before the incident to make sure no tea was unloaded from the Dartmouth, one of the ships involved. The next year he refused a consignment of tea sent to him by James Rivington, a Loyalist in New York.

At 24 years old, Henry married the well-educated Lucy Flucker (1756–1824), the 18-year-old daughter of wealthy Boston Loyalists, on June 16, 1774, despite opposition from her father, who had differing political views. Lucy was an avid reader and the couple met in 1773 at Henry's bookshop. Her brother served in the British Army, and Lucy's family attempted to persuade Knox to join the Army as well. Lucy's Tory parents disowned her when she married Henry. Despite long separations due to his military service, the couple were devoted to one another for the rest of his life, and carried on an extensive correspondence. After the couple fled Boston in 1775, she remained essentially homeless until the British evacuated the city in March 1776. Even afterward, she often traveled to visit Knox in the field. Lucy never saw her estranged parents again after they left, never to return, with the British during their withdrawal from Boston after the Continental Army fortified Dorchester Heights, a success that hinged upon Knox's Ticonderoga expedition. The couple had 13 children but only 3 survived to adulthood.

== Military career ==
=== Siege of Boston ===
The war broke out with the Battles of Lexington and Concord on April 19, 1775. Knox and Lucy snuck out of Boston, and he joined the militia army besieging the city. His abandoned bookshop was looted and all of its stock destroyed or stolen. He served under General Artemas Ward, putting his acquired engineering skills to use developing fortifications around the city. He directed American cannon fire at the Battle of Bunker Hill. General George Washington arrived in July 1775 to take command of the army, and he was impressed by the work that Knox had done. The two also immediately developed a liking for one another, and Knox began to interact regularly with Washington and the other generals of the developing Continental Army. Knox did not have a commission in the army, but John Adams in particular worked in the Second Continental Congress to acquire a commission for him as colonel of the army's artillery regiment. Knox bolstered his own case by writing to Adams that Richard Gridley, the older leader of the artillery under Ward, was disliked by his men and in poor health.

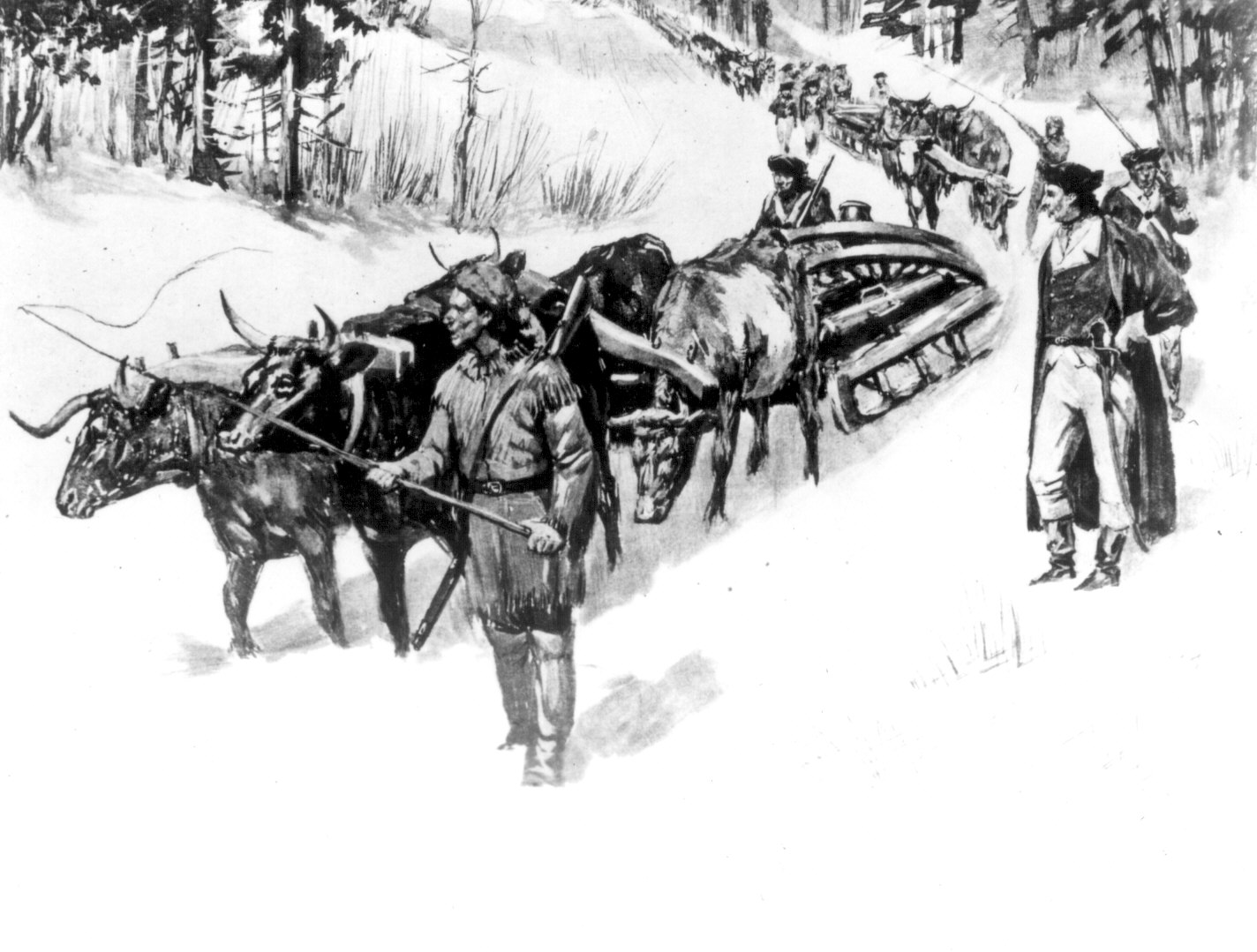
An ox team hauls cannon toward Boston as part of the 1775-76 "Noble train of artillery"

As the siege wore on, the idea arose that cannon recently captured at the fall of forts Ticonderoga and Crown Point in upstate New York could have a decisive impact on its outcome. Knox is generally credited with suggesting the prospect to Washington, who thereupon put him in charge of an expedition to retrieve them even though Knox's commission had not yet arrived. Reaching Ticonderoga on December 5, Knox commenced what came to be known as the noble train of artillery, hauling 60 tons of cannon and other armaments by horse-drawn and ox-drawn sleds across some 300 miles (480 km) of ice-covered rivers and snow-draped Berkshire Mountains to the Boston siege camps.

The region was lightly populated and Knox had to overcome difficulties hiring personnel and draft animals. On several occasions, cannon crashed through the ice on river crossings, but the detail's men were always able to recover them. In the end, what Knox had expected to take just two weeks actually took more than six, and he was finally able to report the arrival of the weapons train to Washington on January 27, 1776. Historian Victor Brooks writes that this was "one of the most stupendous feats of logistics" of the entire war, and Knox's effort is commemorated by a series of plaques marking the Henry Knox Trail in New York and Massachusetts.

The cannon were immediately deployed to fortify the Dorchester Heights recently taken by Washington. The battery's position over Boston harbor led the British to evacuate Boston for Halifax, Nova Scotia. With the siege ended, Knox undertook the improvement of defenses in Connecticut, Rhode Island, and New York in anticipation of a possible British assault. In New York he became friends with Alexander Hamilton, commander of the local artillery. He also established a close friendship with Massachusetts general Benjamin Lincoln.

=== New York and New Jersey campaign ===
Knox was with Washington's army during the New York and New Jersey campaign, including most of the major engagements resulting in the loss of New York City. He narrowly escaped capture following the British invasion of Manhattan, only making it back to the main Continental Army lines through the offices of Aaron Burr. He was in charge of logistics in the critical crossing of the Delaware River that preceded the December 26, 1776 Battle of Trenton. Though hampered by ice and cold, with John Glover's Marbleheaders (14th Continental Regiment) manning the boats, he got the attack force of men, horses and artillery across the river without loss. Following the battle he returned the same force, along with hundreds of prisoners, captured supplies and all the boats back across the river by the afternoon of December 26. Knox was promoted to brigadier general for this accomplishment, and given command of an artillery corps expanded to five regiments. The army again crossed the river a few days later after the decision to make a stand at Trenton. Knox was with the army at the January 3, 1777 at the Battle of the Assunpink Creek, and again the next day at the Battle of Princeton.

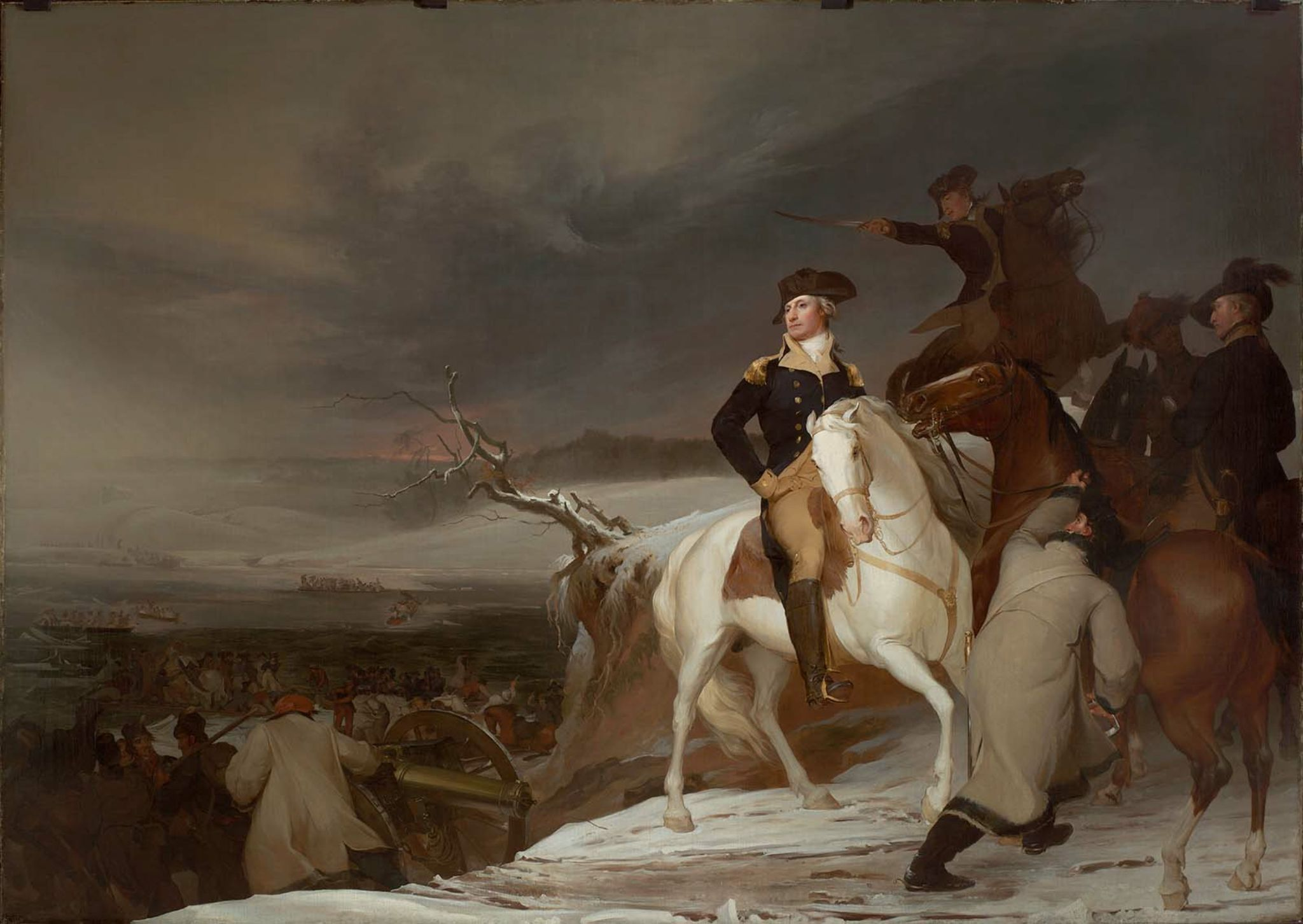
Men are visible behind Washington working to unload cannon in Thomas Sully's 1819 The Passage of the Delaware (Museum of Fine Arts, Boston)

Portrait miniature by Charles Willson Peale, c. 1778

In 1777, while the army was in winter quarters at Morristown, New Jersey, Knox returned to Massachusetts to improve the Army's artillery manufacturing capability. He raised an additional battalion of artillerymen and established an armory at Springfield, Massachusetts before returning to the main army in the spring. That armory, and a second at Yorktown, Pennsylvania established by one of his subordinates, remained valuable sources of war material for the rest of the war.

=== Philadelphia campaign ===
Knox returned to the main army for the 1777 campaign. In June he learned that Congress had appointed Philippe Charles Tronson du Coudray, a French soldier of fortune, to command the artillery. Du Coudray's appointment upset not only Knox, who immediately threatened his resignation to Congress, but also John Sullivan and Nathanael Greene, who also protested the politically motivated appointment. George Washington also wrote Congress on behalf of Knox on May 31, 1777. Du Coudray was subsequently reassigned to the post of inspector general, and died in a fall from his horse while crossing the Schuylkill River in September 1777.

Knox was present at Brandywine, the first major battle of the Philadelphia campaign, and at Germantown. At Germantown he made the critical suggestion, approved by Washington, to capture rather than bypass the Chew House, a stone mansion that the British had occupied as a strong defensive position. This turned out to significantly delay the American advance and gave the British an opportunity to reform their lines. Knox afterward wrote to Lucy, "To [morning fog and] the enemy's taking possession of some stone buildings in Germantown, is to be ascribed the loss of the victory." Knox was also present at the Battle of Monmouth in July 1778, where Washington commended him for the artillery's performance. The army saw no further action that year, but privateers that Knox and fellow Massachusetts native Henry Jackson invested in were not as successful as they hoped; many of them were captured by the British.

=== Artillery training school and Yorktown ===
Knox and the artillery established a winter cantonment at Pluckemin (a hamlet of Bedminster, New Jersey). There Knox established the Continental Army's first school for artillery and officer training. This facility was the precursor to the United States Military Academy at West Point, New York. While there, through the summer of 1779, General Knox spent most of his time training more than 1,000 soldiers in conditions of low morale and scarce supplies. Conditions were exceptionally harsh in the winter of 1779–80, and Washington's army was again largely inactive in 1780 while the main action in the war moved south.

In late September 1780, Knox was a member of the court martial that convicted British Major John André, whose arrest exposed the treachery of Benedict Arnold. (Knox had briefly shared accommodations with André while en route to Ticonderoga in 1775, when André was traveling south on parole after being captured near Montreal.) During these years of relative inaction Knox made several trips to the northern states as Washington's representative to increase the flow of men and supplies to the army. In 1781, Knox accompanied Washington's army south and participated in the decisive siege of Yorktown. He was personally active in the field, directing the placement and aiming of the artillery. The Marquis de Chastellux, with whom Knox established a good friendship, wrote of Knox, "We cannot sufficiently admire the intelligence and activity with which he collected from different places and transported to the batteries more than thirty pieces ...", and "one-half has been said in commending his military genius. Washington specifically called out both Knox and the French artillery chief for their roles in the siege, and recommended to Congress that Knox be promoted.

=== Demobilization ===
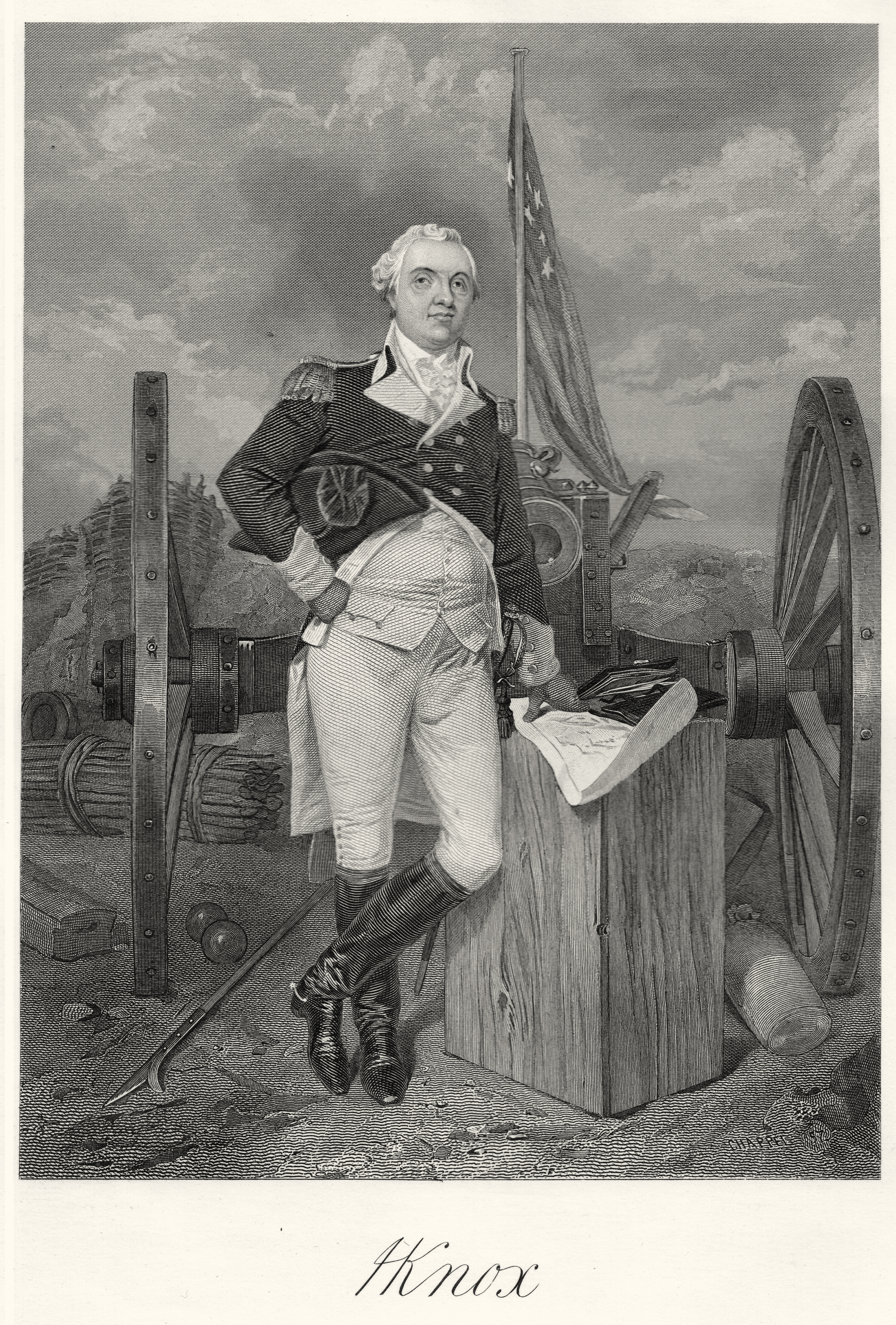
Steel engraving of Henry Knox by Alonzo Chappel

Knox was promoted to major general on March 22, 1782; he became the army's youngest major general. He and Congressman Gouverneur Morris were assigned to negotiate prisoner exchanges with the British. These negotiations failed because the sides could not agree on processes and terms for matching various classes of captives. He joined the main army at Newburgh, New York, and inspected the facilities at West Point, considered a crucial defensive position. After enumerating its defects and needs, Washington appointed him its commander in August 1782. The next month he was devastated by the death of his nine-month-old son, and fell into a depression. He soldiered on, however, becoming involved in negotiations with the Confederation Congress and Secretary of War Benjamin Lincoln over the issue of pensions and overdue compensation for the military. Knox wrote a memorial, signed by a number of high-profile officers, suggesting that Congress pay all back pay immediately and offer a lump-sum pension rather than providing half-pay for life. The unwillingness of Congress to deal with the issue prompted Knox to write a warning letter, in which he wrote "I consider the reputation of the American army as one of the most immaculate things on earth, and that we should even suffer wrongs and injuries to the utmost verge of toleration rather than sully it in the least degree. But there is a point beyond which there is no sufferance. I pray we will sincerely not pass it." When rumors of mutiny in the higher rank circulated in March 1783, Washington held a meeting in which he made an impassioned plea for restraint. In the meeting, Knox introduced motions reaffirming the officers' attachment to Washington and Congress, helping to defuse the crisis. Because of the unresolved issues, however, Knox and others became vigorous proponents of a stronger national government, something which leading political leaders (including Thomas Jefferson, John Hancock, and Samuel Adams) opposed at the time.

With the arrival of news of a preliminary peace in April 1783 Congress began to order the demobilization of the Continental Army, and Washington gave Knox day-to-day command of what remained of the army. During this time Knox organized The Society of the Cincinnati, a fraternal, hereditary society whose original purpose was to support the widows and orphans of Revolutionary War officers. The Society survives to this day. He authored the society's founding document, the Institution, in April 1783 and served as its first Secretary General. Knox also served as The Massachusetts Society of the Cincinnati's first Vice President. The hereditary nature of the society's membership initially raised some eyebrows, but it was generally well received. He also drafted plans for the establishment of a peacetime army, many of whose provisions were eventually implemented. These plans included two military academies (one naval and one army, the latter occupying the critical base at West Point), and bodies of troops to maintain the nation's borders.

When the British withdrew the last of their troops from New York on November 21, 1783, Knox was at the head of the American forces that took over. He stood next to Washington during the latter's farewell address on December 4 at Fraunces Tavern. After Washington resigned his commission as commander-in-chief on December 23, Knox became the senior officer of the army.

The post of Secretary at War became available when Benjamin Lincoln resigned in November 1783, and Lincoln had recommended Knox to follow him. Although the Confederation Congress had been aware of Lincoln's intent to resign when the formal peace arrived, it had not named a successor. Knox had been considered for the job when it was given to Lincoln in 1781, and expressed his interest in succeeding Lincoln. However, in the absence of a guiding hand in the War Department, Congress attempted to implement an idea for a standing militia force as a peacetime army. Knox resigned his army commission in early 1784, "well satisfied to be excluded from any responsibility in arrangements which it is impossible to execute", and Congress' idea failed.

Knox returned to Massachusetts, where the family established a home in Dorchester. Knox worked to reassemble a large parcel of land in Maine (parts of what are sometimes called the Waldo Patent and the Bingham Purchase) that had been confiscated from his Loyalist in-laws. He was able to assemble a vast multi-million acre real estate empire in Maine, including almost all of the old Flucker holdings, in part by getting appointed the state's official for disposing of seized lands, and then transferring the sale of his in-laws' lands to a straw buyer acting on his behalf. He was also appointed to a state commission responsible for negotiating treaty provisions with the Penobscot Indians of central Maine. This commission also became involved in investigating issues surrounding the eastern border with Nova Scotia (now New Brunswick), a matter that would not be resolved until the 1842 Webster-Ashburton Treaty.

== Secretary of War ==
Congress finally appointed Knox the nation's second United States Secretary at War on March 8, 1785, after considering a number of other candidates. Always a large, imposing man at 6 feet 3 inches (1.91 m) tall, Knox is reported to have gained significant weight later in life and been of "immense girth," weighing nearly 300 pounds (140 kg) by the 1780s. The army was by then a fraction of its former size, and the new nation's westward expansion was exacerbating frontier conflicts with Indian tribes. The War Department Knox took over had two civilian employees and a single small regiment. Congress in 1785 authorized the establishment of a 700-man army. Knox was only able to recruit six of the authorized ten companies, which were stationed on the western frontier.

Some members of the Confederation Congress opposed the establishment of a peacetime army, and also opposed the establishment of a military academy (one of Knox's key proposals) on the basis that it would establish a superior military class capable of dominating society. Knox first proposed an army mainly composed of state militia, specifically seeking to change attitudes in Congress about a democratically managed military. Although the plan was initially rejected, many of its details were eventually adopted in the formation and administration of the United States Army. The need for an enhanced military role took on some urgency in 1786 when Shays's Rebellion broke out in Massachusetts, threatening the Springfield Armory. Knox personally went to Springfield to see to its defense. Although Benjamin Lincoln raised a militia force and put down the rebellion, it highlighted the weakness of both the military and defects in the Articles of Confederation that hampered Congressional ability to act on the matter. In the rebellion's aftermath Congress called the Constitutional Convention, in which the United States Constitution was drafted. Knox in early 1787 sent Washington a proposal for a government that bears significant resemblance to what was eventually adopted. When Washington asked Knox if he should attend the convention, Knox urged him to do so: "It would be circumstance highly honorable to your fame, in the judgment of the present and future ages, and double entitle you to the glorious epithet — Father of Your Country." This is probably the first time an important early American figure had characterized Washington as the "Father of His Country". Knox actively promoted the adoption of the new constitution, engaging correspondents in many colonies on the subject, but especially concentrating on achieving its adoption by Massachusetts, where its support was seen as weak. After its adoption he was considered by some to be a viable candidate for vice president, but he preferred to remain in the war office, and the office went to John Adams. With the adoption of the new Constitution and the establishment of the War Department, Knox's title changed to Secretary of War.

As part of his new duties, Knox was responsible for implementation of the Militia Act of 1792. This included his evaluation of the arms and readiness of the militia finding that only 20% of the 450,000 members of the militia were capable of arming themselves at their own expense for militia service as required by the act. To resolve this arms shortage, Knox recommended to Congress that the federal government increase the purchase of imported weapons, ban the export of domestically produced weapons and establish facilities for the domestic production and stockpiling of weapons. These facilities included the existing Springfield Armory and another at Harpers Ferry, Virginia. In 1792 Congress, acting on a detailed proposal from Knox, created the short-lived Legion of the United States.

When the French Revolutionary Wars broke out in 1793, American merchant shipping began to be affected after Washington formally declared neutrality in the conflict. British and French authorities both began seizing American merchantmen which traded with the other nation. Most of the Continental Navy's few ships were sold off at the end of the Revolutionary War, leaving the nation's merchant fleet without any defenses against piracy or government seizures. Knox urged and presided over the creation of a regular Navy, commissioned 6 frigates, including the USS Constitution (still in service today), and established a series of coastal fortifications.

=== Native American diplomacy and war ===
Knox was responsible for managing the nation's relations with the Native Americans resident in lands it claimed, following a 1789 act of U.S. Congress. Knox, in several documents drafted for Washington and Congress, articulated the nation's early Native American policy. He stated that Indian nations were sovereign and possessed the land they occupied, and that the federal government (and not the states) should therefore be responsible for dealings with them. These policies were implemented in part by the passage of the Indian Trade and Intercourse Act of 1790, which forbade the sale of Native American lands except in connection with a treaty with the federal government. Knox wrote, "The Indians, being the prior occupants, possess the right to the soil. It cannot be taken from them except by their consent, or by rights of conquest in case of a just war. To dispossess them on any other principle would be a great violation of the fundamental laws of nature." Historian Robert Miller claims that statements like these seem to support indigenous rights to land, but were ignored in the practice of the Doctrine of Discovery, which came to govern the taking of Native lands.

American Indian Wars, including the Cherokee–American wars and the Northwest Indian War, would occupy much of his tenure. During the years of the Confederation, there had been insufficient Congressional support for any significant action against the Nations on the western frontier. The British supported the northwestern tribes from eight forts in the disputed Northwest Territory, and the Cherokee and Muscogee continued to contest encroachment by American settlers onto their lands. In June 1790, Knox wrote to General Josiah Harmar that diplomacy with the Northwestern Confederacy was no longer an option, and that it instead needed to be subjugated by military force in order to "produce in the Indians a proper disposition for peace". In October 1790 Knox organized a campaign led by General Josiah Harmar into the Northwest Territory in retaliation for Native American raids against American settlers in that territory and that of present-day Kentucky. That campaign failed. A second campaign was organized by Knox, financed by William Duer, and to be led by territorial Governor Arthur St. Clair. Knox and Duer failed to provide enough supplies for the Army, which led to the American Army's greatest defeat in history. These campaigns failed to pacify the Native Americans, and Knox was widely blamed for the failure to protect the frontier.

Seeking to close the issue before he left office, he organized an expedition led by Anthony Wayne that brought the conflict to a meaningful end with the 1794 Battle of Fallen Timbers. Wayne's "troops had burned 'immense fields of corn' for a stretch of about fifty miles along the river", in a move that affected civilian non-combatants. The result of American military action in the Northwest led to the Treaty of Greenville, which forced the defeated Native Americans to cede lands in the Ohio area. The bloody campaigns that Secretary Knox oversaw in some cases involved armies many times larger than later battles in the 1870s.

The Native American nations were reluctant to leave their hunting grounds but Knox thought he could make a deal with the southern tribes headed by Alexander McGillivray. He would promise the U.S. Army would protect them from land-hungry squatters. Washington and Knox generally felt the use of force would be too costly to Americans and a violation of republican ideals. Knox proposed furnishing the Natives with livestock, farming implements, and missionaries, in order to make them pacific farmers. Knox signed the Treaty of New York (1790) on behalf of the nation, ending conflict with some, but not all, Cherokee tribal units. Of the dying off of the native populations in the nation's most heavily populated areas, Knox wrote, "A future historian may mark the causes of this destruction of the human race in sable colors." Knox said how the American government and settlers were treating the Indian tribes so harmfully that "our modes...have been more destructive to the Indian natives than the conduct of the conquerors of Mexico and Peru". He went on to cite the fact that where there was white settlement, there was "the utter extirpation" of natives, or almost none left alive. Regardless of whether the Americans wanted to obtain Native American lands by purchase, conquest or other means, "there would be no lasting peace while land remained the object of American Indian policy", which continued after Knox left office. Washington's policies, as carried out by Secretary Knox, set the stage for the rise of Tecumseh two decades later. Many thousands of Native Americans refused to accept treaties, claiming that they had not approved them and that their only purpose was to remove them from their lands. They specifically cited the Treaty of Greenville, and reoccupied ancestral lands, beginning renewed resistance in the Northwest that was finally crushed in the War of 1812.

On January 2, 1795, Knox was forced to leave the government after rumors that he had profited from contracts for the construction of U.S. frigates which had been commissioned under the Naval Act of 1794 in order to combat Barbary pirates. He returned to his home in Thomaston, District of Maine, which was then part of Massachusetts, to devote himself to caring for his growing family. He was succeeded in the post of Secretary of War by Timothy Pickering.

== Business ventures and land speculation ==
Knox settled in Thomaston and built a magnificent three-story mansion surrounded by outbuildings called Montpelier, the whole of "a beauty, symmetry and magnificence" said to be unequaled in the Commonwealth. He spent the rest of his life engaged in cattle farming, ship building, brick making and real estate speculation. He drew up plans for roads, churches, schools, libraries, and helped Amos Peters, a Revolutionary veteran and freed slave, establish a free black community in what is now Peterborough, Maine. According to the accounts in the history of Warren, Maine, Peters followed Knox to Maine, and Knox gave Peters 150 acres of good farm land. He also recognized the value of the large deposits of marble and limestone in the area. Connections formed during the war years served Knox well, as he invested widely in frontier real estate, from the Ohio valley to Maine (although his largest holdings by far were those in Maine). Although he claimed to treat settlers on his Maine lands fairly, he used intermediaries to evict those who did not pay their rents or squatted on the land. These tactics upset those settlers to the point where they once threatened to burn Montpelier down. It took several years to settle the disputes although hard feelings still persisted.

One of the people Knox took land from was Joseph Plumb Martin, a soldier who settled in Maine and wrote a memoir of his war experiences. Martin felt strongly that he had been unjustly treated by Knox. However, Knox allowed Martin to remain on his land and never demanded payment. Knox briefly represented Thomaston in the Massachusetts General Court where he was an effective and fluent speaker. Readers of Nathaniel Hawthorne's 1851 novel The House of Seven Gables often point to Col Pyncheon as a recreation of Henry Knox. However, Hawthorne himself insisted that his work was purely fiction and grew out of the Salem witch trials—the source of the blood curse cast on the Pyncheon family.

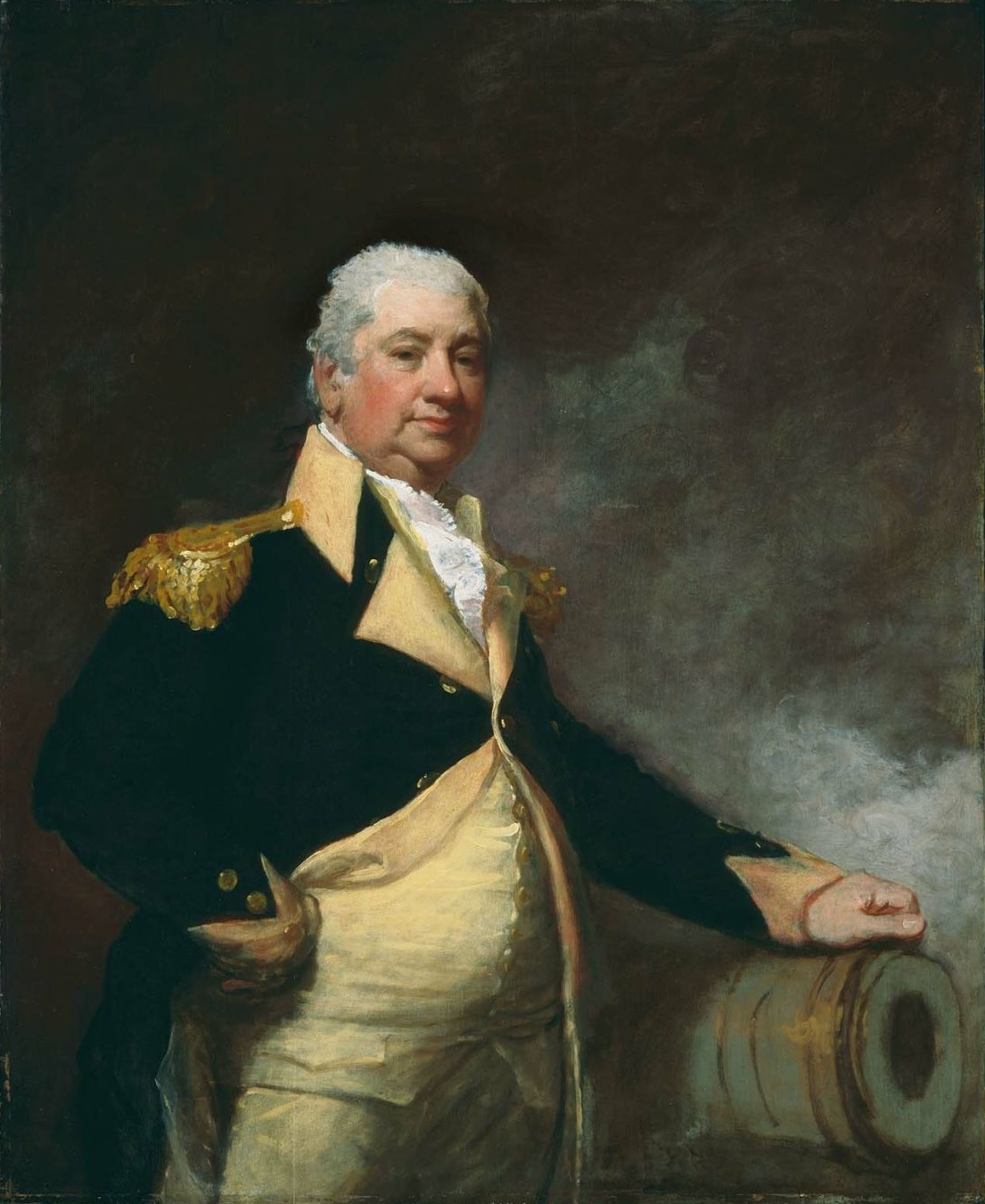
Portrait by Gilbert Stuart, c. 1806

Despite his later extravagance and penchant for entertaining, Knox worried about debt and tried to settle his accounts. In spite of personal financial hardships he experienced during the war, such as the total loss of his bookstore and its contents, Knox managed to make the last payment of £1,000 to Longman Printers in London to cover the price of a shipment of books that he never received. As well as building a landed estate, Knox attempted to enlarge his fortune through industrial craft enterprises. He had interests in lumbering, ship building, stock raising and brick manufacturing. Unfortunately for him, these businesses failed (due in part to a lack of focused investment), and Knox built up significant debts. Knox was forced to sell large tracts of land in Maine to satisfy some of his creditors. One purchaser of his Maine lands was a Pennsylvania banker named William Bingham, leading those tracts to become known locally as the Bingham Purchase. His debts remained significant since his business efforts far outdistanced the revenue he collected, but all this began to change in early 1806. Due to a sale of thousands of acres of land, he paid off a mortgage and satisfied debts to his lenders. Success finally looked promising. However, three months later he was dead.

== Death ==
Knox died at his home on October 25, 1806, at the age of 56, three days after swallowing a chicken bone which lodged in his throat and caused a fatal infection. He was buried in the Thomaston Village Cemetery (Section 3, Lot 280, Row 24, Grave 1) in Thomaston with full military honors.

Lucy Flucker died in 1824, having sold off more portions of the family properties to pay the creditors of Knox's then insolvent estate. The couple had three children that survived to adulthood. Their son, Henry Jackson Knox, became known as a wastrel for his drinking and scandalous behavior. However several years before his death in 1832, he underwent a religious transformation and became "impressed with a deep sense of his own unworthiness" requesting in penance that his remains not be interred with his honored relatives but deposited in a common burial ground "with no stone to tell where." Their daughter Lucy Flucker Knox Thatcher had a son, Henry Thatcher, who would serve honorably as an admiral in the Civil War.

Montpelier remained in the family until it was demolished in 1871, to make way for the Brunswick-Rockland railroad line. The only surviving structure is an outbuilding that was deeded to the Thomaston Historical Society upon its founding in 1972. Built with money raised by ladies of the DAR in 1929, the current Montpelier is an accurate reconstruction of this magnificent mansion not far from the site of the original and houses many of the original possessions of the Knox family. The General Henry Knox Museum is open to the public for guided tours from Memorial Day to Labor Day.

== Honors ==
Towns and cities in Maine, Indiana, Iowa, Illinois, Maryland, and Tennessee are named "Knox" or "Knoxville" in his honor. There are counties named for Knox in Illinois, Indiana, Kentucky, Maine, Missouri, Nebraska, Ohio, Tennessee, and Texas. The house he used as a headquarters in New Windsor, New York, during the Revolution has been preserved as Knox's Headquarters State Historic Site; it is a listed National Historic Landmark. Knox Township, Illinois, is named after Knox, as is Knox Place in the Bronx, New York.

Knox has been honored by the U.S. Postal Service with an 8¢ Great Americans series postage stamp, issued on July 25, 1985, in Thomaston, Maine.

Knox was elected a member of the American Philosophical Society in 1791.

Knox was elected a Fellow of the American Academy of Arts and Sciences in 1805.

General Henry Knox is remembered with honors each year in Boston when they celebrate Evacuation Day on March 17, the day the British evacuated Boston in 1776 during the early days of the Revolution.

Two forts, Fort Knox in Kentucky and Fort Knox (Maine) were named after him. Knox Hall at Fort Sill, Oklahoma, home of the U.S. Army Field Artillery School, is named in his honor, as is an annual award recognizing the performance of U.S. artillery batteries. The Major General Nathanael Greene–class large coastal tug USAV Major General Henry Knox (LT-802) is named in honor of Knox. His papers have been preserved at the Massachusetts Historical Society, and his personal library resides in the Boston Athenaeum in proximity to that of his friend, George Washington.

The SS Henry Knox, a Liberty Ship built in World War II, was named for him.

== In popular culture ==
- Russell Gordon Carter's 1948 young adult short story "Colonel Knox's Oxen" tells the story of the winter trek of the cannons from Ticonderoga to Boston.
- Farnham Scott portrayed Henry Knox in the 1984 miniseries George Washington, and the 1986 sequel George Washington II: The Forging of a Nation.
- In the 2000 film The Crossing, which tells the story of the Revolutionary War's Battle of Trenton, Knox is played by actor John Henry Canavan.
- Seymour Reit's 2001 novel Guns for General Washington tells the story of the winter trek of the cannons from Ticonderoga to Boston from the point of view of Henry Knox's (fictitious?) nineteen-year-old brother Will.
- Knox is portrayed by Del Pentecost in the 2008 HBO miniseries John Adams, which chronicled the life of John Adams. Abigail Adams (John Adams' wife) walks out of her home, and upon seeing Knox and his men traveling down the road pulling two British cannons which they captured from Fort Ticonderoga, Abigail says, "Mr. Knox! You used to sell books to my husband; and now look at you!"
- In the 2015 musical Hamilton, George Washington says to Hamilton, "Nathanael Greene and Henry Knox wanted to hire you" during the song "Right Hand Man".
- In the 2020 documentary miniseries, Washington, Knox is portrayed by actor Josh Taylor.

== Notes ==
Military offices
Preceded by George Washington	Senior Officer of the United States Army; 1783–1784	Succeeded by John Doughty
Political offices
Preceded by Benjamin Lincoln	Continental States Secretary at War; 1785–1789	Position abolished
New office	United States Secretary of War; 1789–1794	Succeeded by Timothy Pickering
