= Newspaper Row (Boston) =

- U.S. National Register of Historic Places
- U.S. Historic district
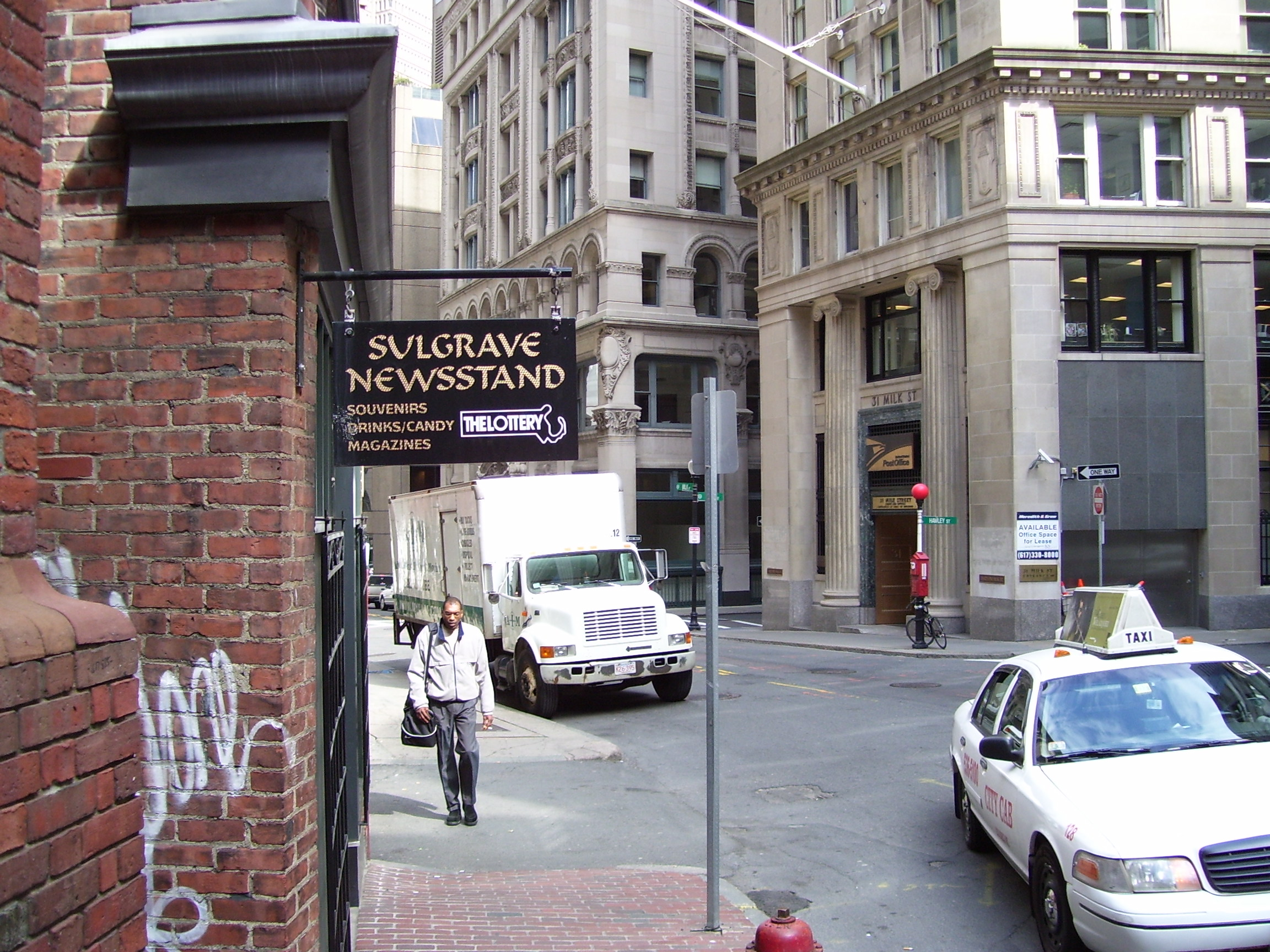

- Location within Boston Location within Massachusetts Location within the United States
- Location: Boston, Massachusetts
- Coordinates: 42°21′24″N 71°3′33″W
- Built: 1873
- Architect: Multiple
- Architectural style: Late Victorian
- NRHP reference No.: 83000607
- Added to NRHP: July 7, 1983

Newspaper Row is a historic district at 322-328 Washington Street, 5-23 Milk Street, and 11 Hawley Street in Boston, Massachusetts. It is listed on the National Register of Historic Places.

== History ==
In its heyday, from the late 1800s to the early 1940s, the area was home to many of Boston's newspapers. As Boston Globe historian Thomas F. Mulvoy Jr. explains, "In the pre-radio era, newspapers along the Row, which began at Milk Street and wound its way down to the Old State House about 200 yards away, spread the news not only in their broadsheet pages but also on blackboards and bulletin boards outside their offices that would lure large crowds anxious to get the very latest telegraphic news flashes on big events like elections, John L. Sullivan's latest fight, and the World Series."

In its first incarnation, Newspaper Row was located between State and Water Streets, in the financial district. But gradually, as the city expanded and more department stores and other businesses opened in the vicinity of Washington Street, the major newspapers moved closer to the center of commerce. By the early 1900s, according to the Boston City Directory, the Boston Globe was at 244 Washington Street, the Boston Evening Transcript was at 324 Washington (at Milk Street), the Boston Post was at 261 Washington Street, the Boston Journal was at 264 Washington Street, the Boston American was at 80-82 Summer Street, and the Associated Press was at 293 Washington Street. Other Boston news services, including the Boston Herald and Boston Traveler, were not far from Newspaper Row. It was a noisy, crowded, narrow part of downtown Boston, but those who worked there did not seem to mind. As Herbert Kenny, a long-time Boston Globe reporter, wrote, "Newspaper Row... was unique. Mingling at Thompson's Spa [a popular nearby restaurant ] were politicians from the State House and City Hall, judges and lawyers from the courthouse, and Yankees from the financial district, along with cops, bookies, bootleggers and reporters, all swapping ideas, compliments, insults and inside information..."

Newspaper Row became a gathering place for the public too, especially during major events like presidential elections, the World Series or the Harvard-Yale football game. Thousands would pack the narrow streets to hear the latest reports. Newspapers would receive bulletins by telegraph and then a staff-member either posted them on a blackboard, or announced the news to the crowd, by means of a megaphone. There was intense competition between the newspapers to see who could get the headlines first.

Newspaper Row was also utilized for promotions, publicity stunts, and advocacy; large numbers of people stopped by to read the headlines or listen to updates, and proponents of various causes would try to get their attention. A good example occurred in 1909, when supporters of giving women the vote sold copies of their pro-suffrage newspaper and engaged people in conversation about suffrage. Another example occurred in 1914, when the Boston Post raised enough funds to purchase three new elephants for the Franklin Park Zoo; the newspaper then held a parade on Newspaper Row and thousands of school children got the chance to meet the elephants.

As the years passed, people became able to receive news and bulletins from radio, and no longer needed to wait on Washington Street for the latest headlines. Gradually, the crowds on Newspaper Row diminished. Newspapers either closed down or moved to larger quarters. The last newspaper to abandon Newspaper Row was the Boston Globe, in May 1958

Newspaper Row was added to the National Register of Historic Places in 1983. And in 2003, the Bostonian Society placed a historical marker at the former home of the Boston Globe, 244 Washington Street.

== Image gallery ==
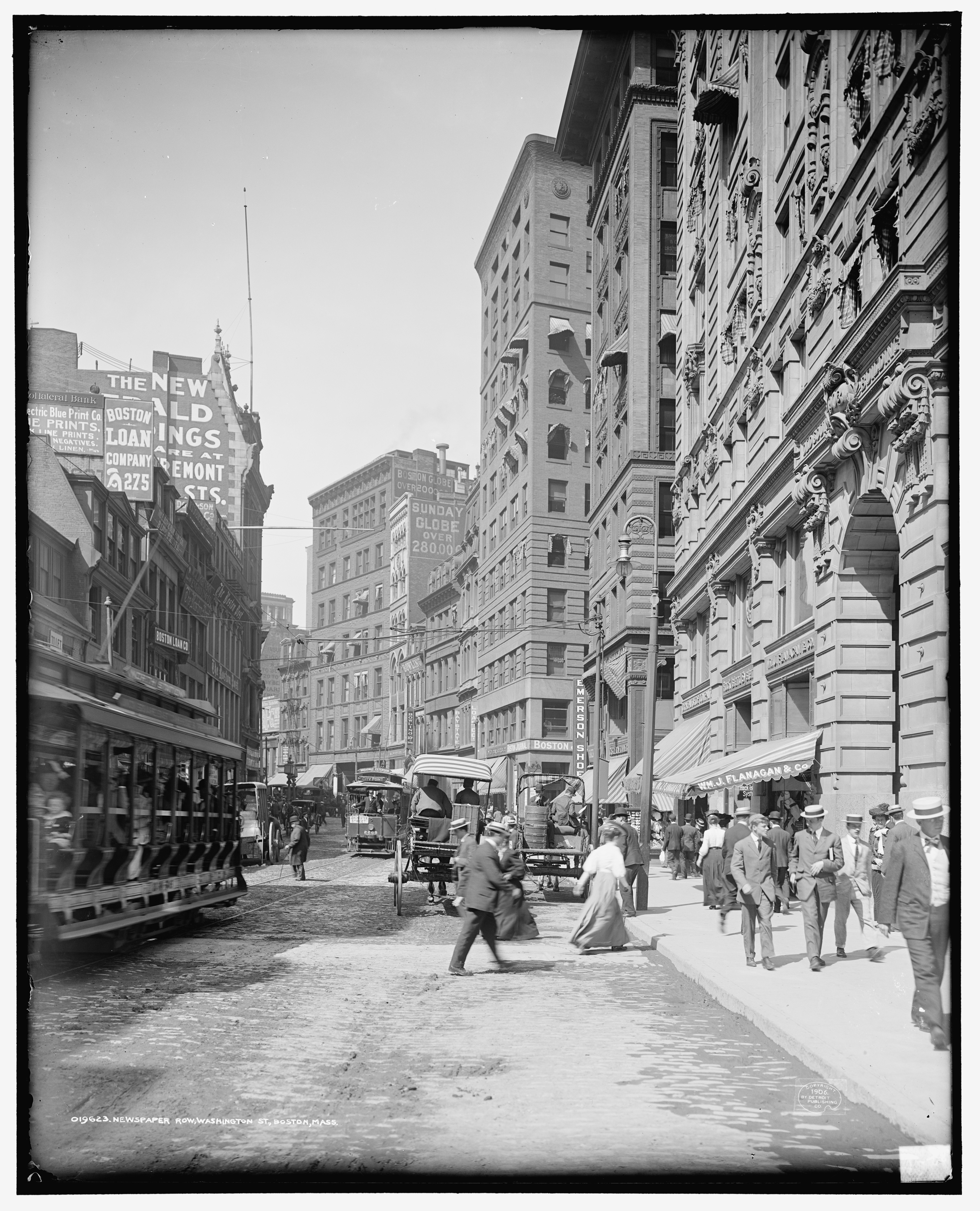
Newspaper Row in ca. 1906, showing the locations of the Boston Post (left), the Boston Globe (center-left) and the Boston Journal (center-right)

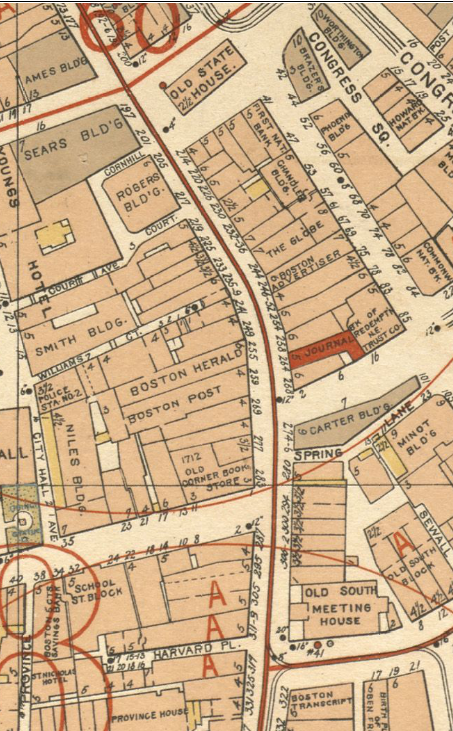
Map of Washington Street, showing several of the newspaper companies along Newspaper Row, 1896

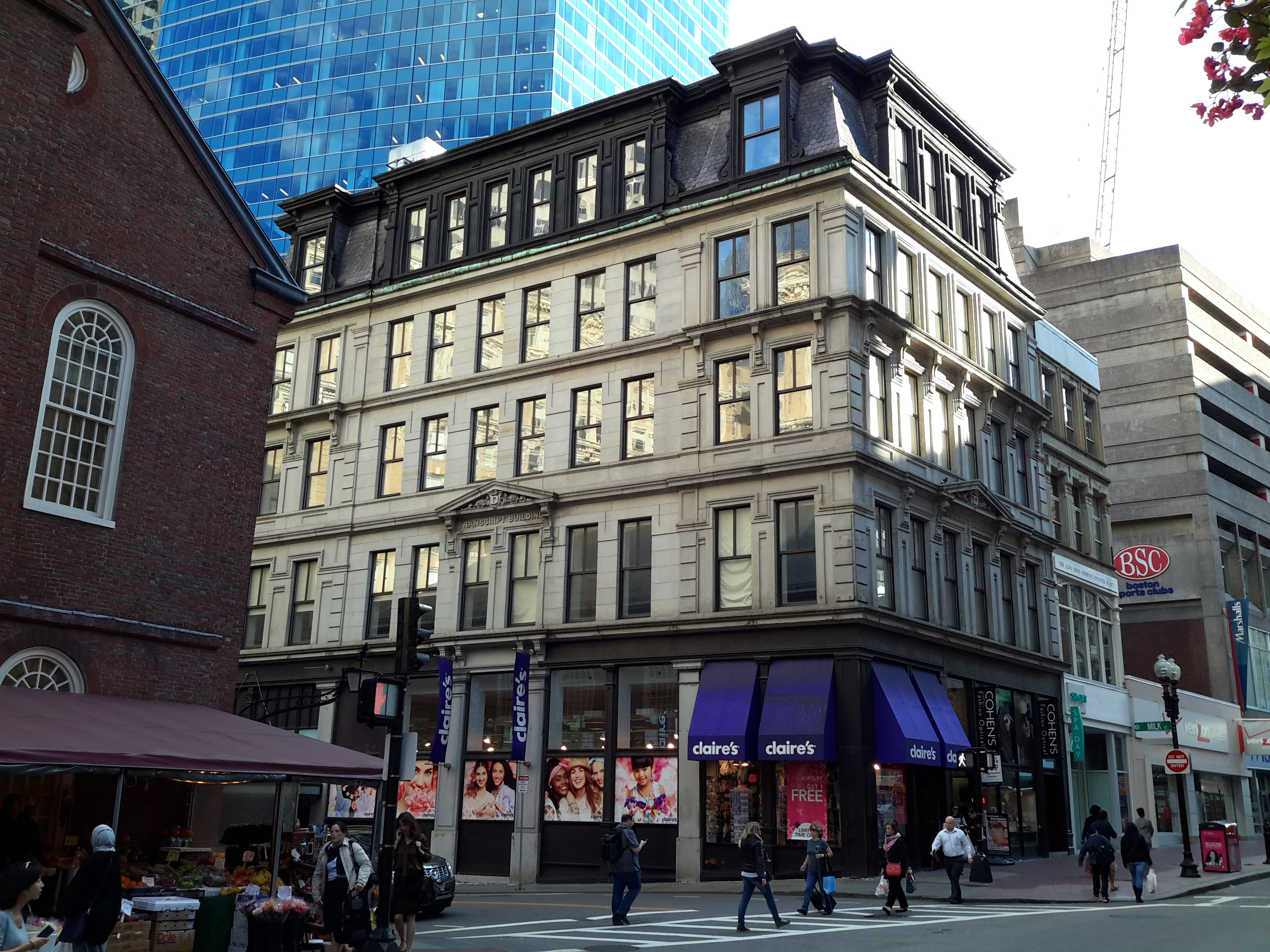
The former building of the Boston Evening Transcript, in 2014

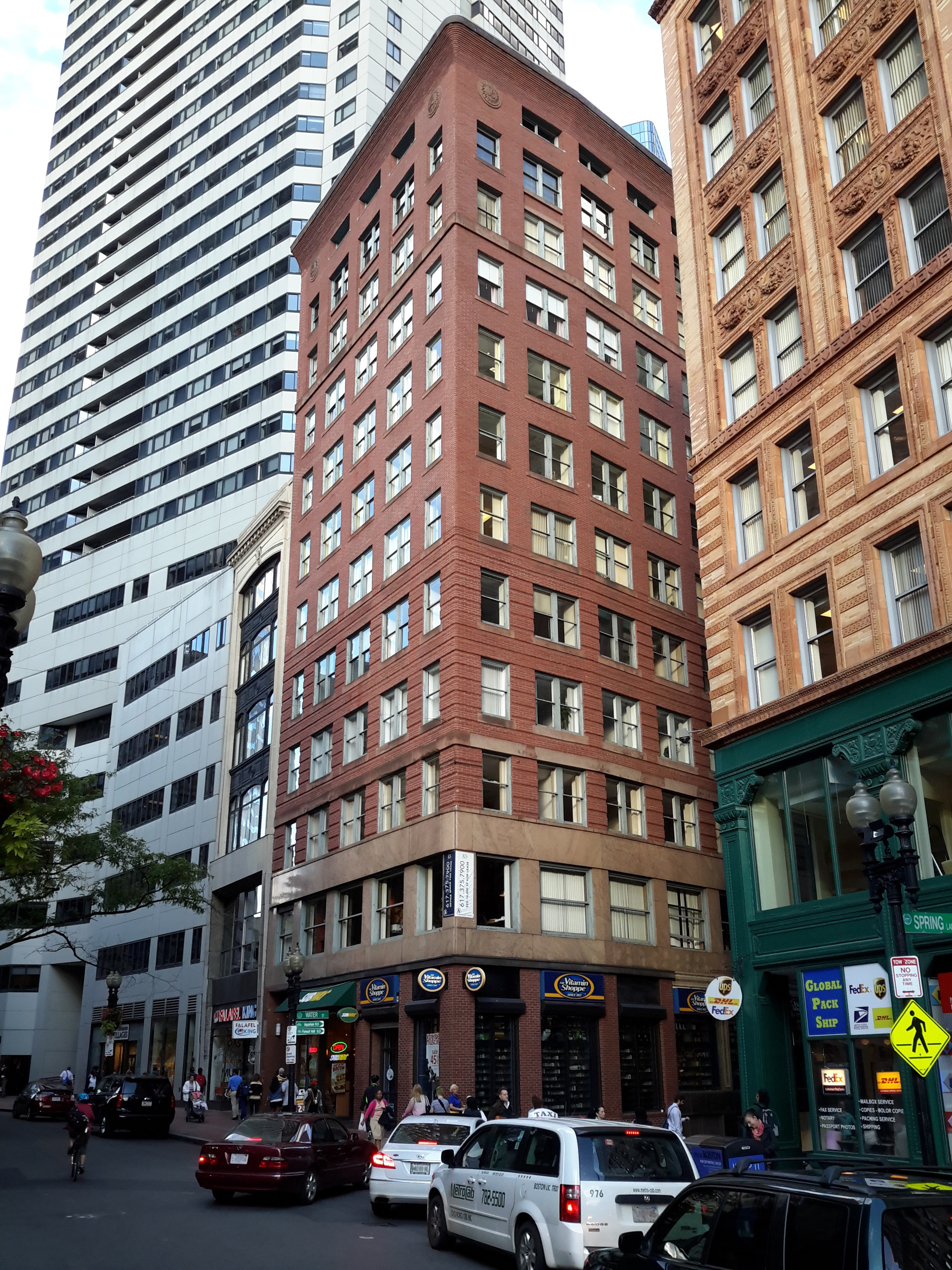
The former building of the Boston Journal, in 2014

== See also ==
- Pie Alley (Boston)
- National Register of Historic Places listings in northern Boston, Massachusetts

== Sources ==
- "First News from the Globe." Boston Globe, November 25, 1900, p. 24.
- "Frenzied Yell At End of Game." Boston Globe, October 17, 1912, p. 5.
- "Greatest Crowd in Newspaper Row History Follows Globe Bulletins." Boston Globe, October 10, 1915,

p. 15.

- Kenny, Herbert A. Newspaper Row: Journalism in the Pre-Television Era. Boston: Globe Pequot Press, 1987.
- Kingsley, Karla. "New Plaque Marks the First Home of the Globe." Boston Globe, January 25, 2003,

p. B2.

- Mulvoy, Thomas F. "FYI." Boston Globe, December 16, 2001, p. CW2.
- "Post Led All: Its Bulletins Gave the Earliest News Last Night." Boston Post, November 4, 1896, p. 8.
- "Suffragette Newsies Cause Commotion in the Streets." Boston Post, November 14, 1909, p. 10.
- "The Press: Up From Newspaper Row." Time magazine, June 2, 1958, n.p.
- Thomas, Jack. "Tales from Newspaper Row." Boston Globe, November 30, 1987, p. 23.
