= USS Thatcher (DD-514) =

Fletcher-class destroyer

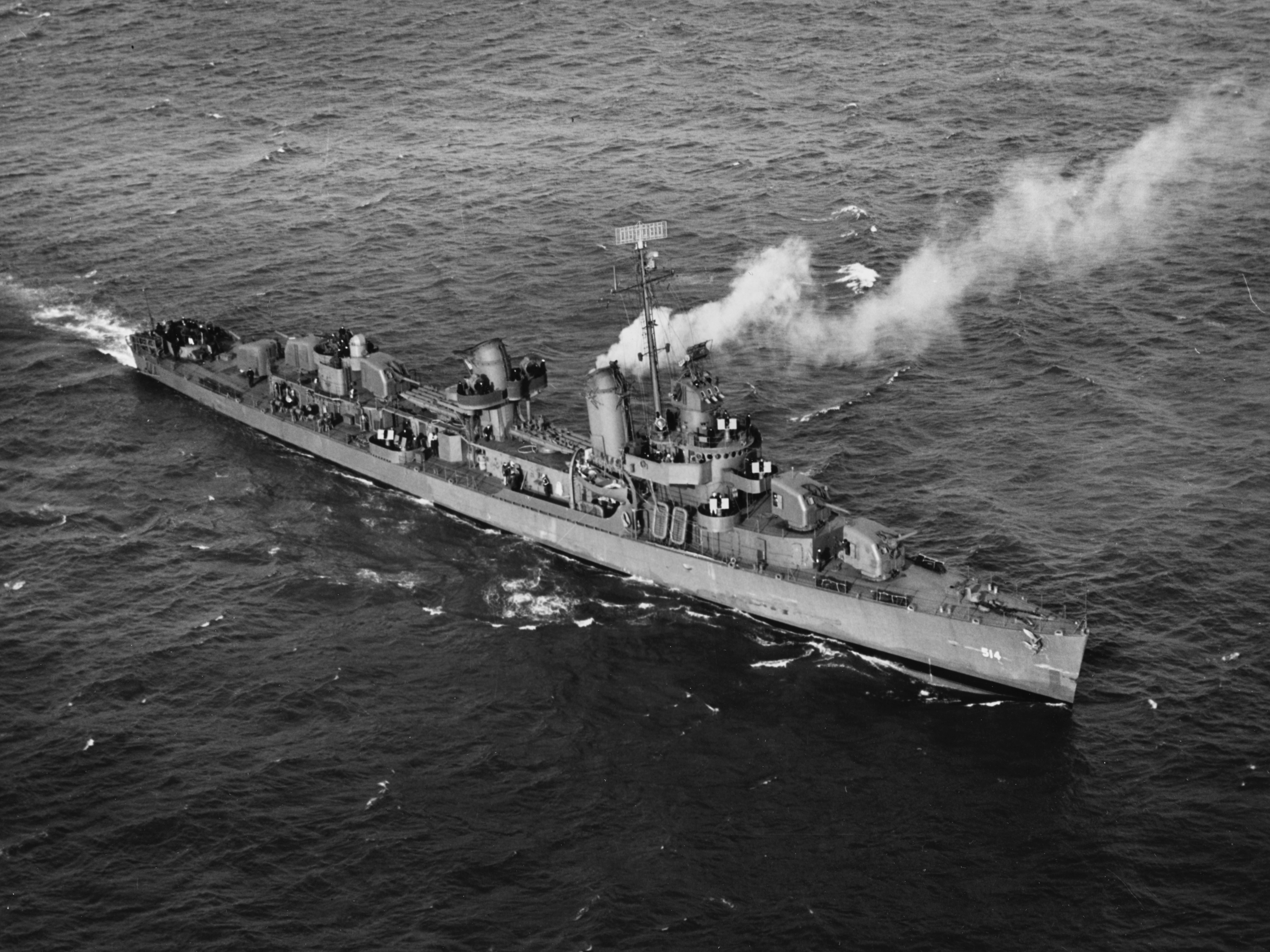
- USS Thatcher (DD-514), underway in Boston harbor, Mass., 28 February 1943.

History

United States
- Namesake: Henry K. Thatcher
- Builder: Bath Iron Works
- Laid down: 20 June 1942
- Launched: 6 December 1942
- Commissioned: 10 February 1943
- Decommissioned: 23 November 1945
- Stricken: 5 December 1945
- Fate: Sold for scrap, 23 January 1948

General characteristics
- Class & type: Fletcher-class destroyer
- Displacement: 2,050 tons
- Length: 376 ft 6 in (114.7 m)
- Beam: 39 ft 8 in (12.1 m)
- Draft: 17 ft 9 in (5.4 m)
- Propulsion: 60,000 shp (45 MW); 2 propellers
- Speed: 35 knots (65 km/h; 40 mph)
- Range: 6500 nmi. (12,000 km) at 15 kt
- Complement: 329
- Armament: 5 × single Mk 12 5 in (127 mm)/38 guns; 5 × twin 40 mm (1.6 in) Bofors AA guns; 7 × single 20 mm (0.8 in) Oerlikon AA guns; 2 × quintuple 21 in (533 mm) torpedo tubes; 6 × single depth charge throwers; 2 × depth charge racks

USS Thatcher (DD-514), a Fletcher-class destroyer, was the second ship of the United States Navy to be named for Rear Admiral Henry K. Thatcher (1806–1880).

Thatcher was laid down on 20 June 1942 at Bath, Maine, by the Bath Iron Works Corp.; launched on 6 December 1942; sponsored by Miss Charlotte L. Hyde; and commissioned on 10 February 1943.

== 1943 ==
The destroyer held her shakedown training in Casco Bay and was then assigned escort duty. She stood out of New York on 29 April with convoy UGF-8 for Casablanca and returned with GUF-8 on 31 May. On 11 June, Thatcher departed the east coast for duty in the Pacific. She joined the Pacific Fleet on the 19th and, after calling at Mare Island Naval Shipyard for armament modifications, arrived at Pearl Harbor on 31 July.

On 22 August, Thatcher joined the fast aircraft carrier task group of Rear Admiral Charles Alan Pownall. They steamed toward Marcus Island and launched air attacks against that enemy base on the 31st. The group returned to Pearl Harbor on 7 September.

The following week, the destroyer got underway for the New Hebrides and arrived at Espiritu Santo on the 27th. She performed escort duty between Espiritu Santo and Guadalcanal and then screened a resupply convoy to Vella Lavella in mid-October. In late October, Task Force 39 (TF 39), composed of Cruiser Division 12 and Destroyer Divisions (DesDiv) 45 and 46, was assembled at Purvis Bay to support the landings on Bougainville. The force—including Thatcher in DesDiv 46—sortied on 30 October.

The fleet bombarded the Buka-Bonis airfields on the night of 31 October and 1 November and then made a high-speed run to the southern tip of the island to shell airfields in the Shortland Islands. After the landings on Cape Torokina on 1 November, TF 39 protected the amphibious forces from enemy interference. That afternoon, TF 39 was ordered to intercept a force of enemy cruisers and destroyers that had left Rabaul to destroy American shipping in Empress Augusta Bay.

At 02:27 on 2 November, radar on the American ships showed surface blips at a range of slightly over 35,000 yards (32 km). The Battle of Empress Augusta Bay began when the destroyers of DesDiv 45 fired a salvo of 25 torpedoes at the Japanese ships. However, due to a right turn by the enemy to close and to get into battle formation, all of the torpedoes missed.

DesDiv 46—composed of Thatcher, Spence, Converse, and Foote—was protecting the rear of the American formation. These ships held their fire until 03:52 when they launched 19 torpedoes against two Japanese destroyers without scoring. However, the American cruisers had been tallying hits on the Japanese cruiser Sendai, which was soon a blazing wreck. During the ensuing melee, Foote was hit by a torpedo that blew off her stern. Spence sideswiped Thatcher, but the resulting damage did not threaten the survival of either ship. Spence signalled Thatcher during the battle: "We’ve just had another close miss. Hope you are not shooting at us." Thatcher replied: "Sorry. You will have to excuse the next four salvos. They’re already on their way." Thatcher's salvos missed the Spence but sank the Japanese destroyer Hatsukaze. Finally, Spence took a hit below the water line that let salt water contaminate her fuel oil. While the Japanese lost Sendai and Hatsukaze, the United States suffered no total losses as Foote was towed to port and repaired. The next day, the Japanese attacked TF 39 with over 100 aircraft. They lost over 20 planes while scoring two hits on Montpelier.

A closer inspection of Thatcher revealed that her collision with Spence had sprung her starboard shaft and had caused extensive dishing of her starboard side amidships. She steamed to Purvis Bay and was routed onward to Nouméa where the misaligned screw was repaired. She then returned to Espiritu Santo where she received orders to proceed to the United States for further repairs. On 20 November, Thatcher got underway as an escort for Birmingham, and the ships arrived at San Francisco on 14 December 1943. After her damage had been corrected at the Mare Island Navy Yard, Thatcher stood out of San Francisco on 11 February 1944 and steamed to Pearl Harbor for refresher training before rejoining TF 39 on 14 March.

== 1944 ==
The task force covered the unopposed landings on Emirau Island on the 20th. On 26 March, Thatcher was reassigned to TG 58.3 of the Fast Carrier Task Force. She escorted the carriers as their aircraft flew strikes against Palau, Yap, Ulithi, and Woleai in the Caroline Islands from 30 March to 1 April. The task group then retired to the Marshall Islands to prepare for their next assault against Japanese bases.

On 13 April, Thatcher escorted the fast carriers to New Guinea as they launched strikes against Hollandia, Wakde, Sawar Airfield, and Sarmi on the 21st and 22d to support the landings for Operations Reckless and Persecution. On 29 April, aircraft from the carriers began a two-day attack against Truk, Ponape, and Satawan. On 1 May, Thatcher was in the screen of the bombardment group that shelled Ponape.

Thatcher returned to Majuro on 4 May to enter a floating drydock for repairs. She returned to sea late in the month for refresher training and firing exercises. On 26 May, her number 3 5 inch gun accidentally fired into her starboard midships 20 mm mount, killing five men and causing considerable structural damage. Repairs were completed in time for the destroyer to accompany TG 58.4 to the Mariana Islands.

While operating with the group near Saipan on 12 June, Thatcher and Charles Ausburne were ordered to rescue some aviators in the water near Pagan Island. The two destroyers closed to within five miles of the enemy-held island before reaching the pilots. It was shortly before dark and, as Charles Ausburne was picking them up, Thatcher investigated a ship which had been sighted about six miles northward. She found a small wooden freighter and took it under fire. The size of the fires which broke out on the target and the subsequent explosions indicated that her cargo was oil and ammunition. Survivors in the water refused the lifelines thrown to them.

Thatcher rejoined her sister destroyer, and they made a sweep of the island seeking further targets. They soon made radar contact, and both ships began firing at 12,000 yards (11 km) but observed no hits. When they had closed the range to 4,700 yards (4.3 km), Ausburne fired star shells which revealed a ship similar to the vessel Thatcher had sunk. She then fired another salvo which set the ship afire. The destroyers found no other targets before they rejoined the task group the next morning.

The carriers conducted air strikes against the Bonin Islands on 15 and 16 June and returned to the Saipan area. On 18 June, when TF 58 prepared for a major battle with the Japanese fleet, Thatcher's group took station on the northern flank of the force. During the ensuing action—later referred to as the "Great Marianas Turkey Shoot"—only a few Japanese planes broke through the American fighter cover, and they caused no damage. Meanwhile, the Japanese lost over 300 aircraft.

The next day, Thatcher and TG 58.4 were detached from the westward-moving task force to refuel and to continue strikes against Rota and Guam. In the early morning of the 20th, carrier aircraft of the group shot down 18 enemy planes and destroyed 52 more on the ground. On 27 June, Thatcher was with the destroyer squadron that was detached to accompany Miami and Houston on a bombardment mission against Rota and Guam. Thatcher and two other destroyers shelled Rota, setting fire to a sugar mill and other buildings, and then joined the other ships off Guam to bombard airfields, shipping, storage tanks, and other worthwhile targets. Thatcher shelled the same islands again three days later and continued the operation through 1 July.

She returned to Eniwetok on 6 July with the task group and remained there for a week before heading back toward the Marianas. The destroyer served with TF 58 until 2 August when she was detached to join Admiral William Halsey's 3d Fleet at Eniwetok. She then joined TG 30.8, the fleet oiler and transport group established to support the 3d Fleet. The ship stood out of Eniwetok on 26 August with several oilers and arrived at Seeadler Harbor on the 31st. She spent the next three months with various units of the group as it provided fuel, mail, and planes for TF 38. They first operated in the vicinity of Palau and Yap when the carriers struck west of the Carolines. TG 30.8 then moved to Ulithi as the carriers shifted their strikes westward to the Philippines and Formosa.

Thatcher then joined TG 38.3 for operations in the Philippine Islands. On 14, 15, and 16 December, the carriers launched strikes against Luzon to support the landings on Mindoro. The group retired to refuel, but the rapidly falling barometer indicated a typhoon approaching. Thatcher was fueled to 50% capacity before the hoses parted due to rough seas. The task force attempted to steam out of the danger area but was near the center of the storm on the 17th and 18th. Three United States destroyers were lost. When the weather cleared and the fleet reassembled, Thatcher joined TG 30.8, a supply group, and served with it until 7 January 1945.

== 1945 ==
On 8 January, Thatcher joined a special fueling group composed of six of the fastest oilers, two escort carriers, and eight destroyers to conduct fueling operations in the South China Sea for the fast carriers. They accompanied the fast carriers into the South China Sea and took station midway between the Philippines and the coast of Indochina. The destroyer remained on station until the 20th when she headed for Guam with a group of empty oilers. Arriving at Apra Harbor on the 27th, she left for Ulithi and the Philippines the following week.

=== Philippines ===
Thatcher joined the 7th Fleet at Leyte on 10 February and, three days later, escorted a convoy to Subic Bay. From 19 February to 3 March, the destroyer provided fire support for the Army forces ashore. Following two weeks of escort duty, the destroyer joined TG 78.3, the Visayan Attack Group. The group sailed on 15 March and headed directly to the landing beaches on the south coast of Panay.

Thatcher was off the landing beaches on 18 March and fired her only bombardment of the day against two groups of Japanese cut off by guerrillas in villages near the assault area. The 40th Infantry Division landed at 09:00 and met very little opposition. As Army troops landed at Negros Occidental on the 29th, the destroyer assisted with call fire and continued the task until 5 April when she was relieved. She refitted at San Pedro to prepare for action in the Ryūkyūs.

== Fate ==
=== Okinawa and kamikaze strike ===
On 13 May, Thatcher got underway for Kerama Retto, near Okinawa. The destroyer was assigned to radar picket duty to detect and intercept enemy aircraft before they could enter the transport anchorages. On 20 May, she detected large numbers of Japanese aircraft approaching the anchorage. All ships opened fire, and Thatcher maneuvered to bring all batteries to bear on the attacking planes. As a low-flying Nakajima Ki-43 "Oscar" fighter passed down her port side, she increased her speed to 25 knots (46 km/h) and commenced firing with her 20 mm and 40 mm guns. The kamikaze climbed steeply, did a wing-over, and dived into the destroyer, striking her aft of the bridge. All power and steering control on the bridge were lost; both radars and the gyro system were out; all external communications were lost; and there was a six- by nine-foot hole between the keel and the bilge. Boyd and Pavlic came alongside to remove the wounded and help extinguish fires.

==== Towing and repair ====
With 14 killed or missing and 53 wounded, the stricken ship limped into Kerama Retto. Thatcher awaited drydock entry until 1 July. On the 13th, she was ready for sea and had to ride out a typhoon in Buckner Bay.

On the 19th, a kamikaze slipped into the bay and dived on the destroyer. His aim was not as accurate as his predecessor, and he bounced off the port side, above the water line, to explode and burn alongside. Damage was slight, and only two men were wounded.

=== Decommissioned, scrapped ===
Thatcher got underway for the United States on 25 July. After calling at Ulithi, Majuro, Eniwetok, Johnston Island, and Hawaii, she arrived at Bremerton, Washington on 20 August. A survey board decided that the ship should be scrapped, and she was decommissioned on 23 November 1945. Thatcher was struck from the Navy List on 5 December 1945 and sold on 23 January 1948 to the Lerner Co., Oakland, California, for scrap.

== Honors ==
Thatcher was awarded 12 battle stars for World War II service.
