= Lucy Flucker Knox =

American revolutionary (1756–1824)

- Born: August 2, 1756; Boston, Massachusetts, British America
- Died: June 20, 1824 (aged 67); Thomaston, Maine, U.S.
- Resting place: Thomaston Village Cemetery; Thomaston, Maine, U.S.
- Spouse: Henry Knox (m. 1774; died 1806)
- Relatives: Samuel Waldo (grandfather); Henry Thatcher (grandson)

Lucy Flucker Knox (August 2, 1756 – June 20, 1824) was an American revolutionary who supported the Continental Army during the American Revolution. She married Henry Knox, who became a leading officer in the Continental Army during the American Revolutionary War. Lucy Knox’s loyalist family disowned her for the decision to marry Henry Knox and support the American cause. Lucy Knox accompanied Henry and lived in the military camps, supporting the troops during the war. She stayed by Henry's side through his military service and term as Secretary of War, until he died in 1806.

== Early life and education ==
Lucy was born in Boston, Massachusetts, into a wealthy family of privilege as the daughter of Thomas Flucker and Hannah Waldo, the daughter of Samuel Waldo. Lucy's father was one of Boston’s wealthiest merchants and the Massachusetts royal secretary, and her brother, Thomas Flucker Jr., was a captain in the British army. Her affluent Loyalist-ranked family gave her access to homeschooled education and a vast amount of resources in the house library. Although little is known about the specifics of her education, it was clearly extensive based on the hundreds of letters she wrote and how she articulated her thoughts and feelings with little hesitation. She was a frequent visitor to Henry Knox's bookstore and that was where the couple first met in 1773 when Lucy was 17.

== Marriage to Henry Knox ==
Lucy’s family wanted Lucy to marry someone of a similar social status and political identity to the Fluckers. However, in June 1774, Lucy married Henry Knox (1750–1806), who was both a bookstore owner and Boston militia officer. Although her parents reluctantly gave consent to the marriage, they disowned Lucy because Henry was a merchant-class suitor at the time. Her family later fled Boston for England after the siege when the British evacuated loyalists from the city, and she would never see her family again.

== Life during the American Revolutionary War ==
After the Battles of Lexington and Concord, Henry, an artillery expert, was pressured into British military service by the Fluckers’ family friend, General Thomas Gage. Henry refused and was threatened with arrest if he attempted to flee Boston. Despite this warning, the Knoxes fled to Worcester, Massachusetts. Henry left Lucy there and returned to Boston, where he joined the Continental Army. During the Revolutionary War, Lucy did not have a place to call home. She frequently moved between renting rooms in taverns and living in the homes of friends. While Lucy and Henry spent extensive periods apart, she also made an effort to visit the war camps as often as she could. Henry was resistant to Lucy visiting because he feared for her safety, as she might get captured by the British troops. Henry also felt that she had already given up so much to the American cause, as she was disowned by her family because of it. However, since Henry was not home to control all the aspects of her life, Lucy often had more autonomy than most women of her time. Despite her husband's wishes, Lucy would often visit the war camps because she missed her husband, who she claimed was the only friend she had in the world. In fact, Lucy sometimes resented Henry for trying to limit her time at the camps because of how lonely she was by herself. At these war camps, like Valley Forge and Morristown, Knox performed many of the duties that camp followers did, like helping with daily chores, serving food, and putting on social events. At Valley Forge, Knox established a close relationship with Martha Washington as they spent much time performing camp follower duties together. They became so close that Lucy even stayed with Martha Washington at Mount Vernon during the Siege of Yorktown.

Even when they were separated for months at a time, Lucy and Henry didn't let their love die out. They were connected through the letters they sent each other. Their letters are preserved at the Gilder Lehrman Institute of American History. They provide a first-hand view of one of the closest people to General Washington as well as an insight into the life of a war-hero spouse.

== Life after the American Revolution ==
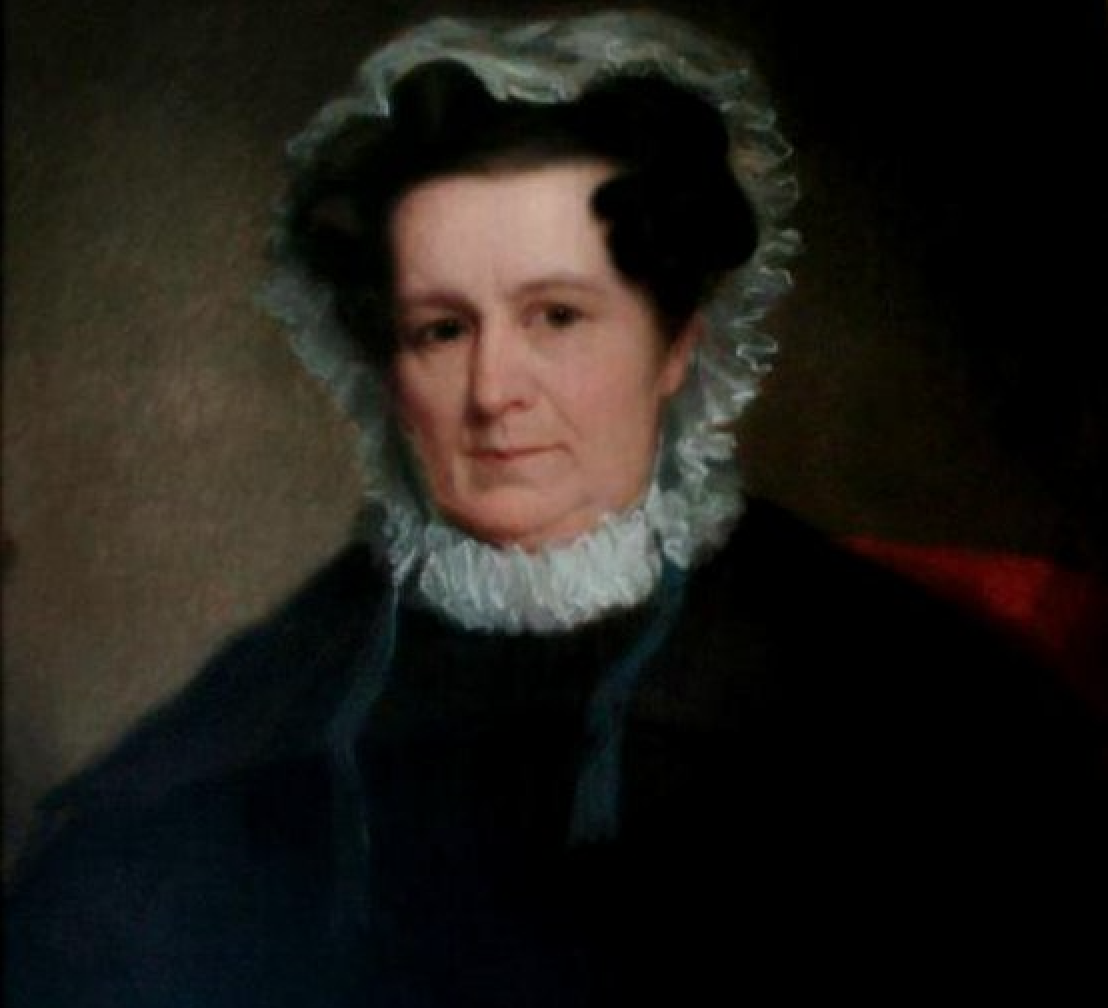
Portrait of Knox's daughter, Lucy Flucker Knox Thatcher, by Albert Gallatin Hoit

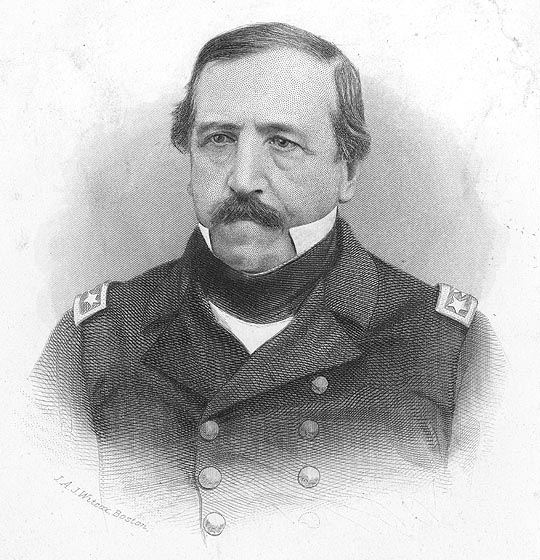
Portrait of Knox's grandson, Admiral Henry Knox Thatcher

Although the War ended in 1783, Henry remained in the military until he resigned his commission in 1784. Lucy had hoped to set roots down in her family’s land, but Henry was appointed as the Secretary of War for the newly formed United States of America in 1785, so the couple headed to Philadelphia, Pennsylvania instead. During this time, Lucy made it clear to Henry that she expected all future family decisions to be made together, and Henry generally abided to this agreement. Additionally, Lucy was able to reestablish some connection with some of her family in England, but their contact was often limited and shallow.

In 1795, the Knoxes moved to what is now Thomaston, Maine, on land which was part of Lucy’s inheritance of the vast tracts of land of the Waldo Patent. There, she and Henry built a nineteen-room mansion, which they named Montpelier, where they entertained hundreds of guests. Henry died in October 1806 at 56 years of age, leaving Lucy, 49, a widow. She died in 1824 at the age of 67.

== Legacy and Descendants ==
In total, Knox gave birth to thirteen children, but only three survived to adulthood: Lucy Flucker Knox Thatcher, Henry Jackson "Hal" Knox, and Caroline II Knox. Her namesake daughter, Lucy Flucker Knox, married Ebenezer Thatcher, a Harvard-educated attorney. The couple had a son named Henry Knox Thatcher, who would serve as a commodore in the American Civil War and be responsible for the capture of Mobile, Alabama near the war's end. Henry Thatcher would later be promoted to the rank of rear admiral following the Civil War in 1866.
