= Henry Thatcher =

US Navy admiral (1806–1880)

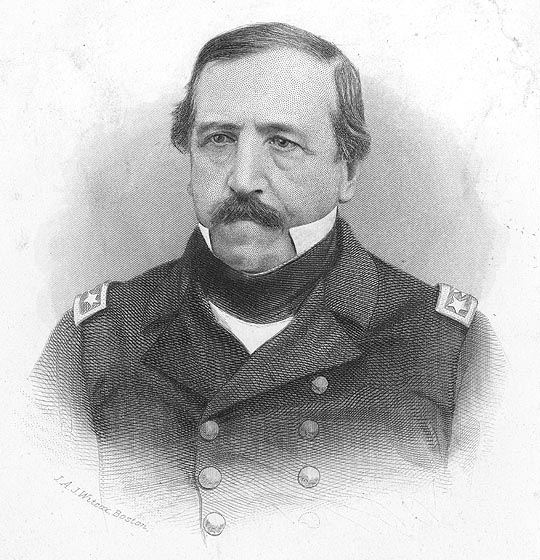
- Born: Henry Knox Thatcher; May 26, 1806; Thomaston, District of Maine, Massachusetts, U.S.
- Died: April 5, 1880 (aged 73); Winchester, Massachusetts, U.S.
- Relatives: Henry Knox (grandfather); Lucy Flucker Knox (grandmother)
- Military career
- Allegiance: United States of America
- Branch: United States Navy
- Service years: 1823–1868
- Rank: Rear admiral
- Commands: Relief; Decatur; Constellation; Colorado; Western Gulf Squadron; North Pacific Squadron
- Conflicts: American Civil War

Henry Knox Thatcher (26 May 1806 – 5 April 1880) was a rear admiral in the United States Navy, who served during the American Civil War.

== Early life and career ==
Thatcher was born in Thomaston, Massachusetts (after 1820 in Maine) to Ebenezer Thatcher and his wife, Lucy (daughter of Major General Henry Knox and Lucy Flucker Knox). Appointed to the U.S. Military Academy at West Point in 1822, Thatcher was absent on sick leave for most of the first year and resigned in April 1823. He then received an appointment as a midshipman in the Navy on 4 March 1823.

Thatcher spent most of the next four years on board the frigate United States in the Pacific. He became a passed midshipman on 4 March 1829, and in 1830–1831 served in the schooner Porpoise and sloop of war Erie in the West Indies.

Thatcher was promoted to lieutenant on 28 February 1833 and served aboard the schooner Experiment in Chesapeake Bay.

Thatcher then served on the frigate Delaware in the Mediterranean Squadron in 1834–1835; had special duty in 1837; and returned to the Mediterranean in the frigate Brandywine in 1840. He served aboard the receiving ship at Boston in 1843–1846, then in the sloop-of-war Jamestown, part of the Africa Squadron in 1847–1850. After duty at Boston Navy Yard in 1851, he commanded the storeship Relief in 1852.

Promoted to commander on 14 September 1855, while serving as Executive Officer of the Naval Asylum at Philadelphia, Thatcher then commanded the small sloop of war Decatur in the Pacific in 1857–1859. He was Executive Officer of the Boston Navy Yard from November 1859 to November 1861, and thus played a role in the vast expansion of the Navy that began with the outbreak of the Civil War in April 1861.

== Civil War service ==
Thatcher was promoted to captain in 1861, and while commanding the large sloop of war Constellation in the Mediterranean, attained the rank of commodore on 3 July 1862.

Thatcher was the first commanding officer of the storeship New Hampshire upon its commissioning in May 1864. He commanded the screw frigate Colorado in the North Atlantic Blockading Squadron in 1864–1865, and a division of Admiral Porter's squadron at the two battles of Fort Fisher in December 1864 and January 1865. Thatcher was then appointed to command of the Western Gulf Squadron, immediately commencing operations in cooperation with General Canby, commander of the Army of West Mississippi, in the capture of Mobile, Alabama. After a brief and vigorous bombardment, Spanish Fort and Fort Blakeley were captured by the Union Army on 9 April 1865. With the key defences of the city lost, the Confederate troops evacuated Mobile on April 12. A formal surrender was demanded by General Granger and Acting-Rear Admiral Thatcher, and possession taken of the city.

On 10 May, the Confederate naval forces in the Gulf surrendered to Thatcher. Sabine Pass and Galveston, the only remaining rebel-held fortified points on the Gulf Coast, capitulated on 25 May and 2 June 1865.

== Post-war career ==
Thatcher remained in command in the Gulf of Mexico until May 1866, receiving promotion to rear admiral on 25 July 1866, and commanded the North Pacific Squadron in 1867–68. There he was presented with a medal and made a Knight of the Order of Kamehameha I by King Kamehameha V of the Hawaiian Islands, an honor that he was permitted to accept by virtue of a special Act of Congress.

Though put on the retired list on 26 May 1868 when he reached the age of 62, Thatcher served as Port Admiral at Portsmouth, New Hampshire, in 1869–1870.

By right of his descent from his grandfather, Major General Henry Knox, Thatcher was a member of the Massachusetts Society of the Cincinnati. He became president of the Massachusetts Society in 1871. He was also a veteran companion of the first class of the Pennsylvania Commandery of the Military Order of the Loyal Legion of the United States (MOLLUS). He was assigned MOLLUS insignia number 700.

Thatcher and his family settled in Winchester, Massachusetts, where he spent the remaining nine years of his life. Rear Admiral Thatcher died at his home on 5 April 1880.

== Namesakes ==
- Two U.S. Navy destroyers have been named in honor of Rear Admiral Thatcher; DD-162 (1919–1940), and DD-514 (1943–1948).
