= Pi Alley =

Alley in Boston, Massachusetts

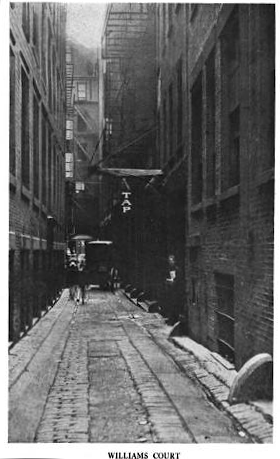
- Pi Alley in 1920

- Location within Boston
- Type: Alley
- Location: Boston, Massachusetts
- Coordinates: 42°21′29.67″N 71°3′32.37″W

Pi Alley (often misspelled Pie Alley) in Boston, Massachusetts, is located off Washington Street, near the Old City Hall on School Street. The origin of the short street's name remains in question. It may be named after the pied type which newspaper composing rooms dumped into the alley in the past, or after the local restaurants that sold coffee and a piece of pie for a nickel. It is also known as Williams Court, Savage's Court, Peck's Arch, and Webster's Arch.

== History ==
Through the years, tenants have included:

- The Bell-in-Hand (est. 1795) was "a faithful reproduction of the taverns fashionable in London" in the 18th century.
- Boston Herald
- Boston police (c. 1854), corner of Court Square and Williams Ct.
- Private residences in 1832 of a clerk, colorer, cordwainer, handcartman, housewright, mariner, nurse, truckman, wheelwright, and several laborers, printers, and widows
- David Francis (1779-1853), printer, publisher (Munroe & Francis)
- "Oakum pickers tenement" (c. 1711). "In 1711, Oct. 2, a fire commenced in Williams' Court in an oakum pickers tenement, where the woman suffered the fire 'to catch the oakum she was employed in picking of;' all the houses and stores on both sides of Washington St. between School St. and Dock Square were laid in ashes."
- Life in Boston, a weekly periodical (c. 1851)
- Samuel Sewall (c. 1727). "Monday, July 10th, 1727, removed with my family to Boston. Hired a house in Deacon Williams Court next house to Deacon Williams, N. Gates and N. Gleason, bringing my household stuff."
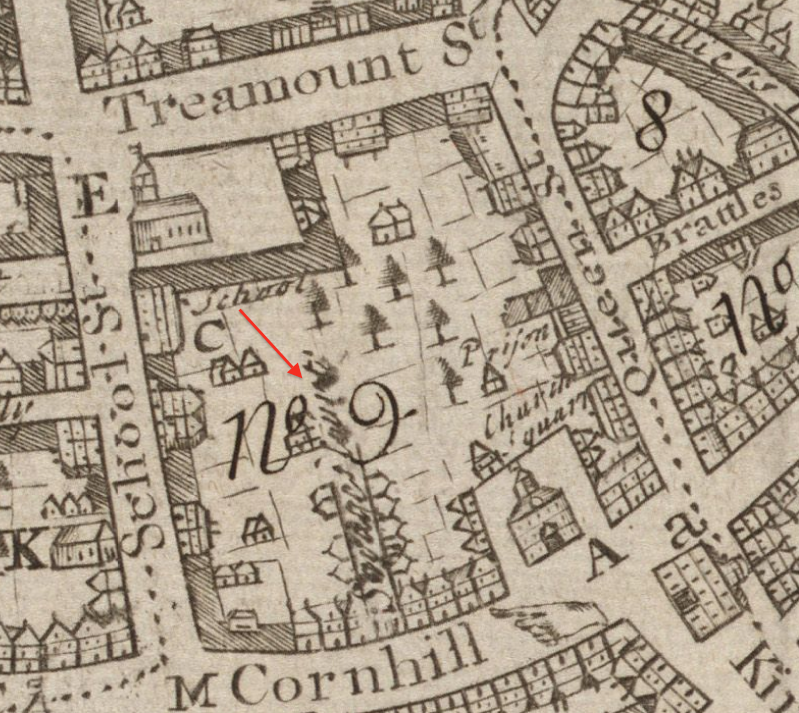
Detail of 1743 map of Boston, showing Savage's Court

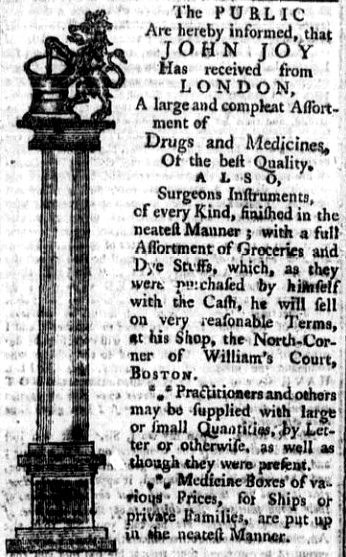
Drugs and medicines, 1774

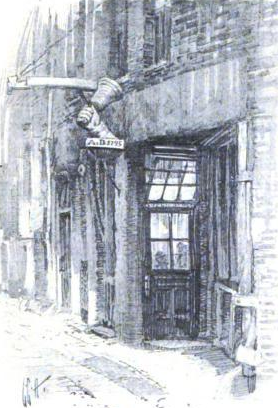
Bell-in-Hand, established 1795

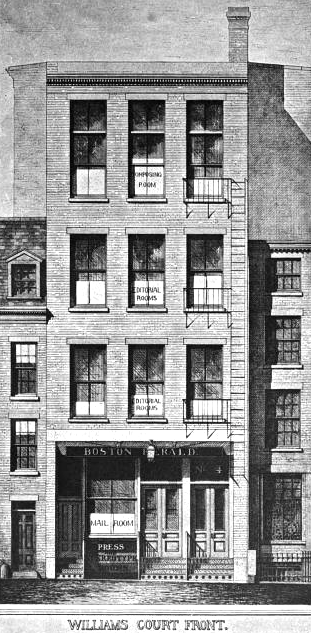
Boston Herald, Williams Court, 19th century

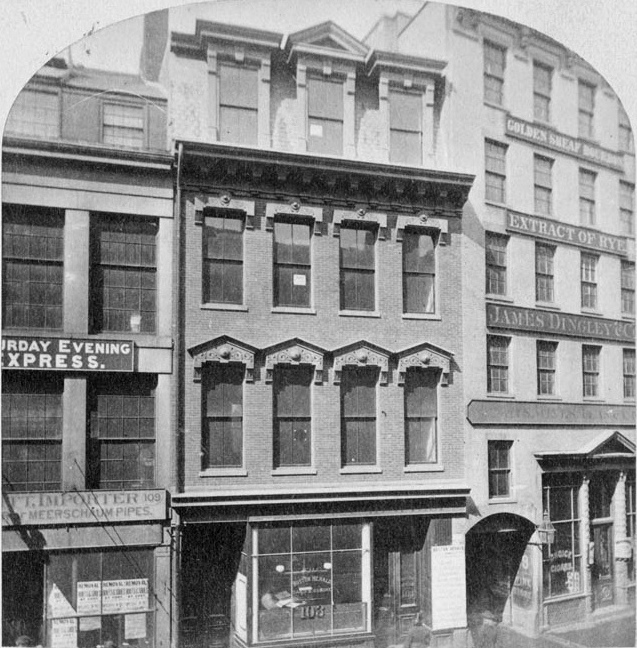
Entrance to Pi Alley "through the arch at 103 Washington Street," Boston, 19th century

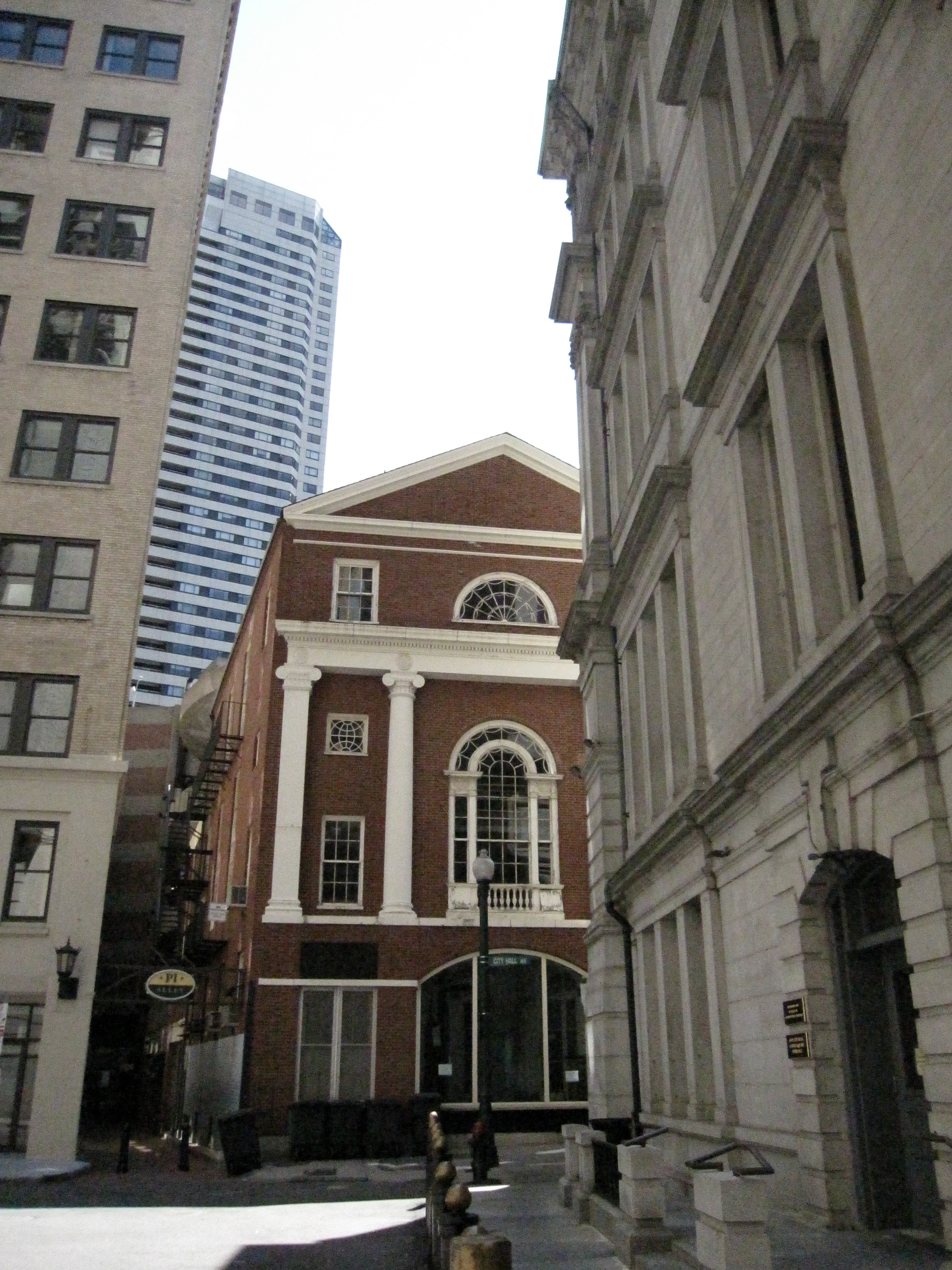
Entrance to Pi Alley, behind Old City Hall, 2010

== See also ==
- Newspaper Row (Boston)
