= Peninsula campaign order of battle: Confederate =

The following Confederate Army units and commanders were the initial structure on April 30, 1862, of the Confederate Army of Northern Virginia during the Peninsula campaign of the American Civil War. It contains units throughout Virginia that influenced the campaign. The Union order of battle is listed separately.

== Abbreviations used ==
=== Military rank ===
- Gen = General
- MG = Major General
- BG = Brigadier General
- Col = Colonel
- Ltc = Lieutenant Colonel
- Maj = Major
- Cpt = Captain
- Lt = Lieutenant

== Army of Northern Virginia ==
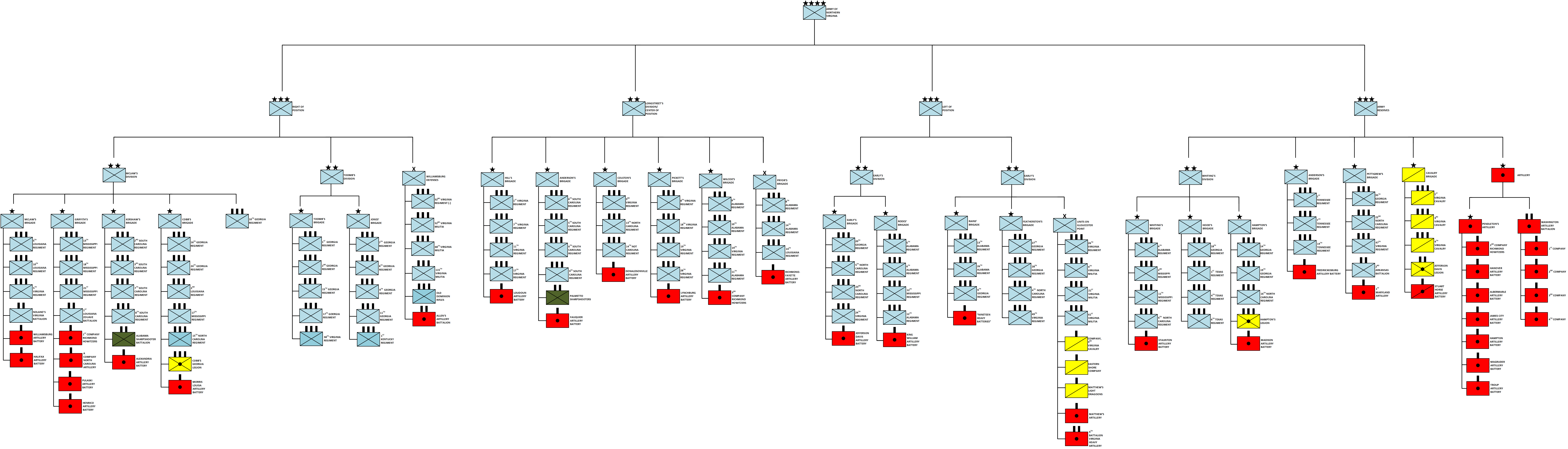
Organization of the Confederate Army of Northern Virginia

The following organization of the Army of Northern Virginia on the Peninsula was established on April 30. Prior to this organization, Confederate forces were organized ad hoc, as they arrived in theater. The divisions were grouped by their place in the Warwick Line.

Gen Joseph E. Johnston, Commanding
Maj Thomas G. Rhett, Adjutant and Chief of Staff

Staff:

- Maj A. Pendleton Mason, Assistant Adjutant
- Ltc Walter H. Stevens, Chief Engineer
- Maj E. Porter Alexander, Chief of Ordnance
- Maj Archibald H. Cole, Quartermaster
- Maj Robert G. Cole, Chief Commissary
- Dr. Samuel Choppin, Chief Surgeon
- Lt James B. Washington, aide-de-camp

=== Right of Position (Army of the Peninsula) ===
Even after its absorption into the Army of Northern Virginia, Magruder continued to style his command the "Army of the Peninsula." It was assigned responsibility for the section of the line from the James River to Dam No. 1.

MG John B. Magruder, Commanding
Cpt Henry Bryan, Adjutant

Division	Brigade	Regiments and others
McLaws' Division BG Lafayette McLaws	McLaws' Brigade BG Lafayette McLaws	5th Louisiana: Col Henry Forno; 10th Louisiana: Col Mandeville DeMarigny; 15th Virginia: Col Thomas P. August; Noland's Virginia Battalion: Ltc Callender St. George Noland; Williamsburg Artillery: Cpt William R. Garrett; Halifax Artillery: Cpt Edward R. Young
McLaws' Division BG Lafayette McLaws	Griffith's Brigade BG Richard Griffith	1st Louisiana Zouave Battalion: Ltc Georges A. De Coppens; 13th Mississippi: Col William Barksdale; 18th Mississippi: Col Thomas M. Griffin; 21st Mississippi: Col Benjamin G. Humphreys; Peninsula Artillery: Cpt Joseph B. Cosnahan; 1st Co., Richmond Howitzers: Cpt Edward S. McCarthy; Co. A, 1st North Carolina Artillery: Cpt Basil C. Manly; Pulaski Artillery: Cpt John P.W. Read; Henrico Artillery: Cpt Johnson H. Sands
McLaws' Division BG Lafayette McLaws	Kershaw's Brigade BG Joseph B. Kershaw	2nd South Carolina: Col John D. Kennedy; 3rd South Carolina: Col James D. Nance; 7th South Carolina: Col Thomas G. Bacon; 8th South Carolina: Col John W. Henagan; Alabama Sharpshooter Battalion: Maj Archibald Gracie; Alexandria Artillery: Cpt Delaware Kemper
McLaws' Division BG Lafayette McLaws	Cobb's Brigade BG Howell Cobb	16th Georgia: Col Goode Bryan; 24th Georgia: Ltc C.C. Sanders; Cobb's Georgia Legion: Col T.R.R. Cobb; 2nd Louisiana: Col William M. Levy; 17th Mississippi: Col W.D. Holder; 15th North Carolina: Col Henry A. Dowd; Morris Louisa Artillery: Cpt R.C.M. Page
McLaws' Division BG Lafayette McLaws	Reserves	10th Georgia: Col A. Cumming
Toombs' Division BG Robert Toombs	Toombs' Brigade BG Robert Toombs	1st Georgia (Regulars): Col William J. Magill; 2nd Georgia: Ltc William R. Holmes; 15th Georgia: Col Thomas W. Thomas; 17th Georgia: Col Henry L. Benning; 38th Virginia: Col Edward C. Edmonds
Toombs' Division BG Robert Toombs	Jones' Brigade BG P.J. Semmes	7th Georgia: Col William T. Wilson; 8th Georgia: Col Lucius M. Lamar; 9th Georgia: Ltc John C. Mounger; 11th Georgia: Ltc Theodore L. Guerry; 1st Kentucky: Col Thomas H. Taylor
	Forces at Wiliamsburg Col Benjamin S. Ewell	32nd Virginia (one company); 52nd Virginia Militia; 68th Virginia Militia; 115th Virginia Militia; Old Dominion Rifles; Allen's Artillery Battalion; Artillery Companies B & C

Both brigades of Toombs' Division and Griffith's Brigade and Kershaw's Brigade from McLaws' Division were old Army of the Potomac units that had been transferred to reinforce the Warwick Line. Magruder had organized his army only in two very large divisions under McLaws and Rains, and several additional regional commands. Upon the arrival of Johnston, he reorganized the divisions into four brigades, two of which, Cobb's and McLaws', remained under his direct command. The reserve brigade and forces at Williamsburg are both also from the old Army of the Peninsula. The 17th Mississippi was stationed at Leesburg and the 24th Georgia in Goldsboro, until they became early reinforcements for Magruder.

=== Center of Position ===
The center was the area between Dam No. 1 and Redoubts 4 and 5 outside Yorktown

MG James Longstreet, Commanding
Cpt Moxley Sorrel, Adjutant

Division	Brigade	Regiments and others
Longstreet's Division MG James Longstreet	Hill's Brigade BG A.P. Hill	1st Virginia: Col Lewis B. Williams, Jr.; 7th Virginia: Col James L. Kemper; 11th Virginia: Col Samuel Garland; 17th Virginia: Col Montgomery D. Corse; Loudoun Artillery: Cpt Arthur L. Rogers
Longstreet's Division MG James Longstreet	Anderson's Brigade BG Richard H. Anderson	4th South Carolina: Col B.E. Sloan; 5th South Carolina: Col J.R.R. Giles; 6th South Carolina: Col John Bratton; 9th South Carolina: Col J.D. Blanding; Palmetto Sharpshooters: Col Micah Jenkins; Fauquier Artillery: Cpt Robert M. Stribling
Longstreet's Division MG James Longstreet	Colston's Brigade BG Raleigh E. Colston	3rd Virginia: Col Joseph Mayo; 13th North Carolina: Col Alfred M. Scales; 14th North Carolina: Col P.W. Roberts; Donaldsonville Artillery: Cpt Victor Maurin
Longstreet's Division MG James Longstreet	Pickett's Brigade BG George Pickett	8th Virginia: Col Eppa Hunton; 18th Virginia: Col Robert E. Withers; 19th Virginia: Col John B. Strange; 28th Virginia: Col Robert C. Allen; Lynchburg Artillery: Cpt James Dearing
Longstreet's Division MG James Longstreet	Wilcox's Brigade BG Cadmus Wilcox	9th Alabama: Col Samuel Henry; 10th Alabama: Col John J. Woodward; 11th Alabama: Col Sydenham Moore; 19th Mississippi: Col Christopher H. Mott; 3rd Co., Richmond Howitzers: Cpt Robert C. Stanard
Longstreet's Division MG James Longstreet	Pryor's Brigade Col John A. Winston	8th Alabama: Ltc Thomas E. Irby; 14th Alabama: Col Thomas James Judge; 14th Louisiana: Col Richard W. Jones; Richmond Fayette Artillery: Cpt Miles C. Macon

Colston's Brigade was the First Brigade of the Department of Norfolk, then briefly served as part of the Army of the Peninsula, before being transferred to Longstreet's command at the end of April. Pryor's Brigade was a new organization, made up of troops from the old Army of the Peninsula plus the 14th Alabama, detached from the Department of Aquia in the winter to recover from disease in Richmond. The other brigades are from the old Army of the Potomac.

=== Left of Position ===
The responsibility of the left was at Yorktown, extending to Redoubts 4 and 5. Rains' Brigade was stationed within Yorktown itself, giving him direct command over the defensive batteries present there.

MG Daniel Harvey Hill, Commanding
Cpt James W. Ratchford, Adjutant

Division	Brigade	Regiments and others
Early's Division BG Jubal Early	Early's Brigade BG Jubal Early	20th Georgia: Col John B. Cumming; 5th North Carolina: Col Duncan K. McRae; 23rd North Carolina: Col John P. Hoke; 24th Virginia: Col William R. Terry; Jefferson Davis Artillery (AL): Cpt James W. Bondurant
Early's Division BG Jubal Early	Rodes' Brigade BG Robert Rodes	5th Alabama: Col Christopher C. Pegues; 6th Alabama: Col John B. Gordon; 12th Alabama: Col Robert T. Jones; 12th Mississippi: Col William H. Taylor; King William Artillery: Cpt Thomas H. Carter
Early's Division BG Jubal Early	Detached Col George T. Ward	2nd Florida: Col George T. Ward; 2nd Mississippi Battalion: Ltc John G. Taylor
Rains' Division BG Gabriel J. Rains	Rains' Brigade BG Gabriel J. Rains	13th Alabama: Col Birkett D. Fry; 26th Alabama Col Edward A. O'Neal; 6th Georgia: Col Alfred H. Colquitt; 23rd Georgia: Col Thomas Hutcherson; "Nineteen heavy batteries"
Rains' Division BG Gabriel J. Rains	Featherston's Brigade BG W.S. Featherston	27th Georgia: Col Levi B. Smith; 28th Georgia: Col Thomas J. Warthen; 4th North Carolina: Col George B. Anderson; 49th Virginia: Col William "Extra Billy" Smith
Rains' Division BG Gabriel J. Rains	Units on Glouscester Point Col Charles A. Crump	26th Virginia: Ltc Powhatan A. Page; 46th Virginia Infantry: Ltc J. H. Richardson; 9th Virginia Militia; 21st Virginia Militia; 61st Virginia Militia; 3rd Virginia Cavalry (one company); Eastern Shore Company; Mathews Light Dragoons; Mathews Artillery: Cpt Andrew D. Armistead; 4th Battalion, Virginia Heavy Artillery; King and Queen Artillery: Cpt John R. Bagby; Piedmont Battery B: Cpt Charles C. Otey; Powhatan Artillery: Cpt Jordan; Gloucester Artillery: Cpt Thomas B. Montague

Rains' Brigade, the reserve detachment for Early's Division, and the units at Glouscester Point were all part of the old Army of the Peninsula. Early's, Rodes', and Featherston's Brigades were from the old Army of the Potomac.

=== Reserve ===
The reserve consisted of troops from the District of Aquia, which Smith had assumed command of from Theophilus Holmes on March 23. Smith left a single brigade under Charles W. Field in the District and brought the rest to the Peninsula.

MG Gustavus W. Smith, commanding
Cpt John W. Riely, adjutant

Division	Brigade	Regiments and others
Whiting's Division BG W.H.C. Whiting	Whiting's Brigade Col Evander M. Law	4th Alabama: Ltc Thomas J. Goldsby; 2nd Mississippi: Col John Marshall Stone; 11th Mississippi: Col Philip F. Liddell; 6th North Carolina: Col William Dorsey Pender; Staunton Artillery: Cpt William L. Balthis
Whiting's Division BG W.H.C. Whiting	Hood's Brigade (Texas Brigade) BG John B. Hood	18th Georgia: Col William T. Wofford; 1st Texas: Col Alex T. Rainey; 4th Texas: Col John Marshall; 5th Texas: Col James J. Archer
Whiting's Division BG W.H.C. Whiting	Hampton's Brigade BG Wade Hampton	14th Georgia: Col Felix L. Price; 19th Georgia: Lt. Col Thomas Coke Johnson (KIA); Lt. Thomas C. Johnson; 16th North Carolina: Col C.T.N. Davis; Hampton's Legion: Ltc Martin W. Gary; Madison Louisiana Artillery: Cpt George V. Moody
Directly commanded by Smith	Anderson's Brigade BG S.R. Anderson	1st Tennessee: Col Peter Turney; 7th Tennessee: Col John F. Goodner; 14th Tennessee: Col William A. Forbes; Fredericksburg Artillery: Cpt Carter M. Braxton
Directly commanded by Smith	Pettigrew's Brigade BG Johnston Pettigrew	2nd Arkansas Battalion: Maj William N. Bronaugh; 35th Georgia: Col E.L. Thomas; 22nd North Carolina: Col Charles E. Lightfoot; 47th Virginia: Col Robert M. Mayo; 1st Maryland Artillery: Cpt R. Snowden Andrews

=== Cavalry and artillery reserves ===
Type	Brigade	Regiments and others
Cavalry	Cavalry Brigade BG J.E.B. Stuart	1st Virginia Cavalry: Col Fitzhugh Lee; 3rd Virginia Cavalry: Col Thomas F. Goode; 4th Virginia Cavalry: Col Beverly Robertson; Jeff. Davis Legion: Ltc William T. Martin; Stuart Horse Artillery: Cpt John Pelham
Artillery BG William N. Pendleton	Pendleton's Corps BG William N. Pendleton	2nd Co., Richmond Howitzers: Cpt Lorraine F. Jones; Hanover Artillery: Cpt George W. Nelson; Albemarle Artillery: Cpt William H. Southall; James City Artillery: Cpt Lucien W. Richardson; Hampton Artillery: Cpt C.L. Smith; Magruder Artillery: Cpt Thomas J. Page; Troup Artillery: Cpt Henry Hull Carlton
Artillery BG William N. Pendleton	Washington Artillery Battalion Col James B. Walton	1st Co.: Cpt Charles Winder Squires; 2nd Co.: Cpt Thomas L. Rosser; 3rd Co.: Cpt Merritt "Buck" Miller; 4th Co.: Lt Joseph Norcom

== Other troops in the Department of Northern Virginia ==
These troops helped shape the theater for the Peninsula campaign.

=== Huger's division (Department of Norfolk) ===
The bulk of troops from the Department of Norfolk were formally folded into the Department of Northern Virginia at the beginning of April, but Huger continued to refer to his command by its former name.

BG Benjamin Huger, commanding

Division	Brigade	Regiments and others
Huger's Division MG Benjamin Huger	Second Brigade BG William Mahone	6th Virginia: Ltc Henry W. Williamson; 12th Virginia: Col David A. Weisiger; 16th Virginia: Ltc John C. Page; 41st Virginia: John R. Chambliss; 12th North Carolina: Col Solomon Williams; Moorman's Battery: Cpt Marcellus Moorman; Portsmouth Artillery: Cpt Cary Grimes
Huger's Division MG Benjamin Huger	Third Brigade BG Albert G. Blanchard	22nd Georgia: Col Robert H. Jones; Norfolk Artillery: Cpt Frank Huger
Huger's Division MG Benjamin Huger	Fourth Brigade BG Lewis A. Armistead	5th Virginia Battalion: Ltc Fletcher H. Archer; 53rd Virginia: Col Harrison B. Tomlin; 57th Virginia: Col Elisha F. Keen
Huger's Division MG Benjamin Huger	Detached or Unbrigaded	3rd Georgia: Col Ambrose R. Wright; 3rd Alabama: Col Jones M. Withers; 9th Virginia: Col David J. Godwin

Huger had not completed brigading his regiments at the beginning of the campaign. Additionally, significant portions of what would become Armistead's Brigade and Blanchard's Brigade were out of theater in Richmond or North Carolina. The 12th North Carolina would be detached to join a brigade fresh from North Carolina under Lawrence O'Bryan Branch for an aborted attempt to reinforce Jackson in the Valley. They would instead be moved to outside Richmond where they would take part in the Battle of Hanover Court House.

=== Aquia District ===
MG Gustavus W. Smith, Commanding
(absent with the Army of Northern Virginia)

Brigade	Regiments and others
Field's Brigade BG Charles W. Field	5th Alabama Battalion; 40th Virginia: Col John M. Brockenbrough; 55th Virginia: Col Francis Mallory; 60th Virginia: Col William E. Starke; 2nd Virginia Heavy Artillery (reorganized as infantry); 3rd Virginia Heavy Artillery (Local Defense) (disbanding); Purcell's Artillery: Cpt William Pegram

=== Troops around Gordonsville ===
Johnston had detached Ewell to maintain communication with Jackson. Ewell nominally reported to D.H. Hill, but was actually operating semi-independently. On May 17, Johnston would transfer the division to the Valley District under Jackson.

MG Richard S. Ewell

Division	Brigade	Regiments and others
Ewell's Division MG Richard S. Ewell	Fourth Brigade BG Arnold Elzey	13th Virginia: Col James A. Walker; 1st Maryland: Col Bradley T. Johnson; Baltimore Light Artillery: Cpt John B. Brockenbrough
Ewell's Division MG Richard S. Ewell	Seventh Brigade BG Isaac Trimble	15th Alabama: Col James Cantey; 21st Georgia: Col John T. Mercer; 16th Mississippi: Col Carnot Posey; 21st North Carolina: Col William W. Kirkland; Richmond Artillery: Cpt Alfred R. Courtney
Ewell's Division MG Richard S. Ewell	Eighth Brigade BG Richard Taylor	6th Louisiana: Col Isaac G. Seymour; 7th Louisiana: Col Harry T. Hays; 8th Louisiana: Col Henry B. Kelly; 9th Louisiana: Col Leroy A. Stafford; 1st Louisiana Special Battalion: Maj C. Roberdeau Wheat
Ewell's Division MG Richard S. Ewell	Cavalry	2nd Virginia Cavalry: Col Thomas T. Munford; 6th Virginia Cavalry: Ltc Thomas S. Flournoy

=== District of the Valley ===
MG Stonewall Jackson, Commanding
Maj Robert L. Dabney, Adjutant

Staff:

- Lt A.S. "Sandie" Pendleton, Assistant Adjutant General
- Maj Abner Smead, Inspector General
- Maj Daniel Truehart, Chief of Artillery
- Lt James M. Garnett, Ordnance Officer
- Lt James K. Boswell, Engineer
- Mr. Jedediah Hotchkiss, Topographical Engineer
- Maj John A. Harmon, Quartermaster
- Dr. Hunter McGuire, Chief Surgeon
- Maj Wells J. Hawks, Commissary
- Col William Lowther Jackson, aide-de-camp
- Col Charles J. Faulkner, aide-de-camp
- Lt George G. Junkin, aide-de-camp
- Lt Henry Kyd Douglas, aide-de-camp

Division	Brigade	Regiments and others
Jackson's Division MG Thomas J. Jackson	First Brigade (Stonewall Brigade) BG Charles S. Winder	2nd Virginia: Col James W. Allen; 4th Virginia: Col Charles A. Ronald; 5th Virginia: Col William S. Baylor; 27th Virginia: Col Andrew J. Grigsby; 33rd Virginia: Col John F. Neff; Rockbridge Artillery: Cpt William T. Poague; Allegheny Battery: Cpt Joseph Carpenter
Jackson's Division MG Thomas J. Jackson	Second Brigade Col John A. Campbell	21st Virginia: Col John M. Patton; 42nd Virginia: Ltc D.A. Langhorne; 48th Virginia: Ltc Thomas S. Garnett; 1st Virginia (Irish) Battalion: Maj John Seddon; Hampden Battery: Cpt William H. Caskie; West Augusta Battery: Cpt Wilfred E. Cutshaw
Jackson's Division MG Thomas J. Jackson	Third Brigade BG William B. Taliaferro	10th Virginia: Ltc E.T.H. Warren; 23rd Virginia: Col Alexander G. Taliaferro; 37th Virginia: Col Samuel V. Fulkerson; Danville Artillery: Cpt George W. Wooding
Jackson's Division MG Thomas J. Jackson	Cavalry Col Turner Ashby	7th Virginia Cavalry: Col Turner Ashby; Mounted Artillery: Cpt R. Preston Chew
