= First Battle of Bull Run order of battle: Confederate =

The following Confederate units and commanders fought in the First Battle of Bull Run on July 21, 1861. The Union order of battle is shown separately. Order of battle compiled from the army organization during the battle and the reports.

== Abbreviations used ==
=== Military rank ===
- BG = Brigadier General
- Col = Colonel
- Ltc = Lieutenant Colonel
- Maj = Major
- Cpt = Captain
- Lt = Lieutenant

=== Other ===
- (w) = wounded
- (mw) = mortally wounded
- (k) = killed in action
- (c) = captured

== Confederate forces ==
BG Joseph E. Johnston, Commanding

=== Army of the Potomac ===
BG P. G. T. Beauregard

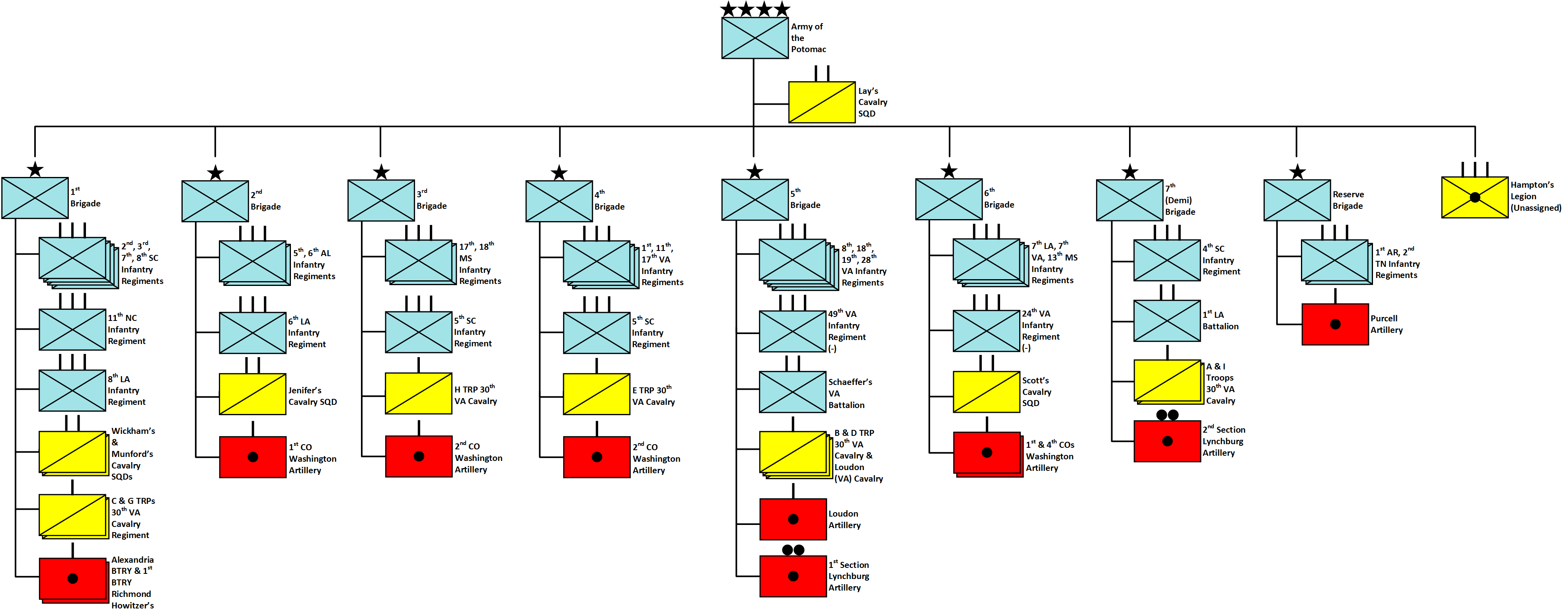
Organization of the Army of the Potomac

General Staff:

- Chief of Staff: Col Thomas Jordan
- Chief Engineer: Ltc Thomas H. Williamson
- Chief Signal Officer: Cpt Edward P. Alexander

Headquarters Escort:

- Lay's Squadron (Virginia) Cavalry: Cpt John F. Lay

| Brigade | Regiments and Others |
|---|---|
| First Brigade BG Milledge L. Bonham | 11th North Carolina: Col William W. Kirkland; 2nd South Carolina: Col Joseph B. Kershaw; 3rd South Carolina: Col James H. Williams; 7th South Carolina: Col Thomas G. Bacon; 8th South Carolina: Col Ellerbe B. C. Cash; 8th Louisiana: Col Henry B. Kelly; Wickham's Squadron (Virginia) Cavalry: Cpt Williams C. Wickham; 30th Virginia Cavalry, Troops C and G: Col Richard C. W. Radford; Munford's Squadron (Virginia) Cavalry: Ltc Thomas T. Munford; Alexandria (Virginia) Light Artillery: Cpt Delaware Kemper; Richmond Howitzers Battalion Artillery, 1st Battery: Cpt John C. Shields |
| Second Brigade BG Richard S. Ewell | 5th Alabama: Col Robert E. Rodes; 6th Alabama: Col John J. Seibels; 6th Louisiana: Col Isaac G. Seymour; Washington (Louisiana) Artillery, 1st Company: Cpt Thomas L. Rosser; Jenifer's Squadron (Virginia) Cavalry: Ltc William H. Jenifer |
| Third Brigade BG David R. Jones | 17th Mississippi: Col Winfield S. Featherston; 18th Mississippi: Col Erasmus R. Burt; 5th South Carolina: Col Micah Jenkins; 30th Virginia Cavalry, Troop H: Cpt Joel W. Flood; Washington (Louisiana) Artillery, 2nd Company: Cpt Merritt B. Miller |
| Fourth Brigade BG James Longstreet | 5th North Carolina: Ltc Joseph P. Jones; 1st Virginia: Maj Frederick G. Skinner; 11th Virginia: Col Samuel Garland, Jr.; 17th Virginia: Col Montgomery D. Corse; Independent Squad Texas Rangers; 30th Virginia Cavalry, Troop E: Cpt Edgar Whitehead; Washington (Louisiana) Artillery, 3rd Company, Second Section: Lt John J. Garnett |
| Fifth Brigade Col Philip St. George Cocke | 8th Virginia: Col Eppa Hunton; 18th Virginia: Col Robert E. Withers; 19th Virginia: Ltc John B. Strange; 28th Virginia: Col Robert T. Preston; 49th Virginia (3 companies): Col William Smith; Schaeffer's Virginia Battalion (3 companies): Cpt Francis B. Schaeffer; Loudoun (Virginia) Cavalry: Cpt William W. Mead; 30th Virginia Cavalry, Troops B and D: Cpt G. W. H. Hale; Loudoun (Virginia) Battery: Cpt Arthur L. Rogers; Lynchburg (Virginia) Artillery, First Section: Cpt H. Grey Latham |
| Sixth Brigade Col Jubal A. Early | 7th Louisiana: Col Harry T. Hays; 13th Mississippi: Col William Barksdale; 7th Virginia: Col James L. Kemper; 24th Virginia (6 companies): Ltc Peter Hairston, Jr.; Scott's Squadron (Virginia) Cavalry: Maj John Scott; Washington (Louisiana) Artillery, 1st and 4th Companies: Lt Charles W. Squires |
| Seventh (Demi) Brigade Col Nathan G. Evans | 1st Louisiana Special Battalion: Maj Chatham R. Wheat (w); 4th South Carolina: Col John B. E. Sloan; 30th Virginia Cavalry, Troops A and I: Cpt William R. Terry; Lynchburg (Virginia) Artillery, Second Section: Lt George S. Davidson |
| Reserve Brigade BG Theophilus H. Holmes | 1st Arkansas: Col James F. Fagan; 2nd Tennessee: Col William B. Bate; Purcell (Virginia) Artillery: Cpt R. Lindsay Walker |
| Unassigned Infantry | Hampton's (South Carolina) Legion: Col Wade Hampton (w), Cpt James Conner |

=== Army of the Shenandoah ===
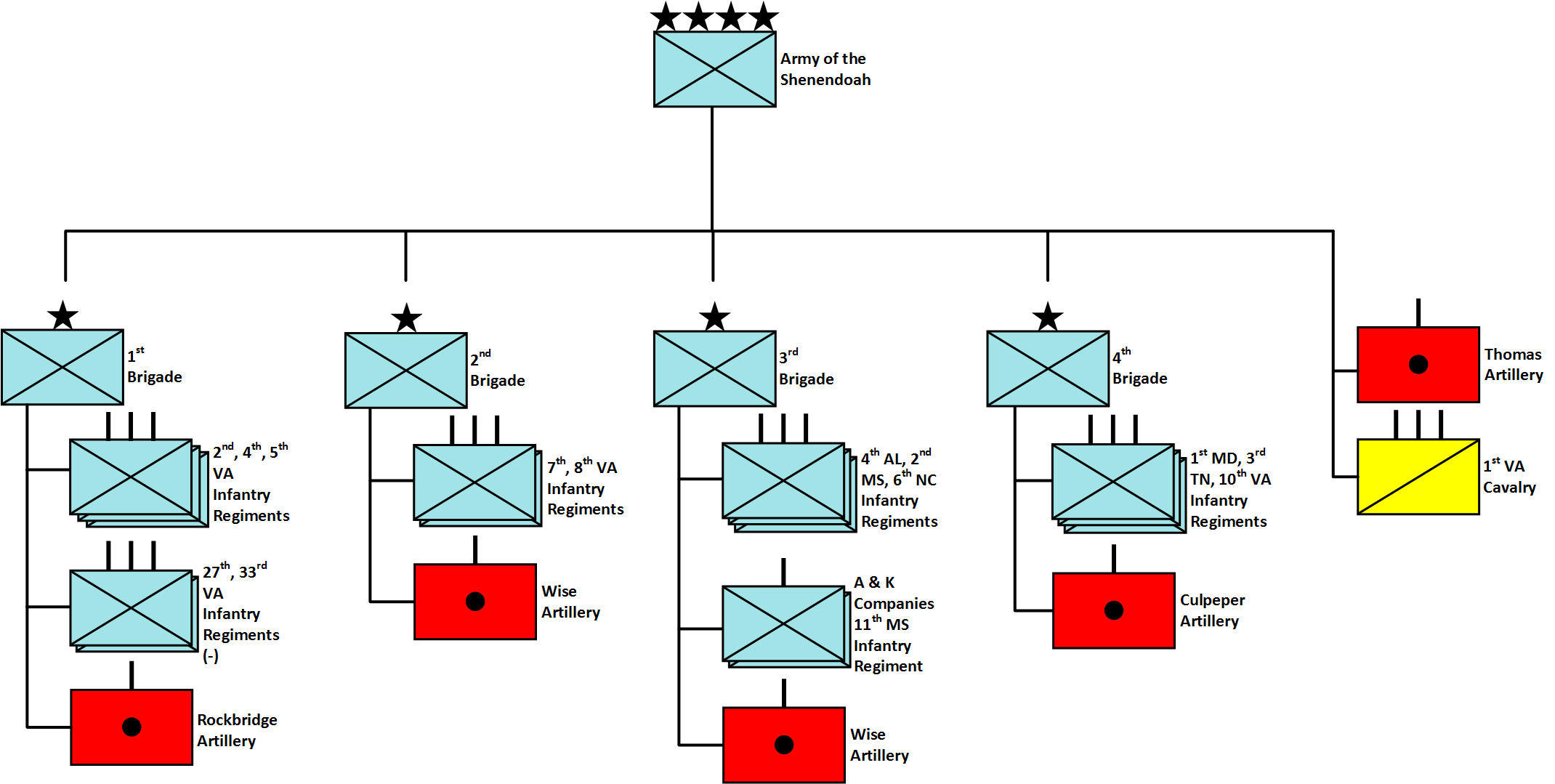
Army of the Shenandoah

BG Joseph E. Johnston

General Staff:

- Chief of Artillery: Col William N. Pendleton
- Chief Engineer: Maj William H.C. Whiting

| Brigade | Regiments and Others |
|---|---|
| First Brigade BG Thomas J. Jackson (w) | 2nd Virginia: Col James W. Allen; 4th Virginia: Col James F. Preston; 5th Virginia: Col Kenton Harper; 27th Virginia (7 companies): Ltc John Echols; 33rd Virginia (8 companies): Col Arthur C. Cummings; Rockbridge (Virginia) Artillery: Lt John P. Brockenbrough |
| Second Brigade Col Francis S. Bartow (k); Col Lucius J. Gartrell | 7th Georgia: Col Lucius J. Gartrell; 8th Georgia: Ltc William M. Gardner (w); Wise (Virginia) Artillery: Lt John Pelham |
| Third Brigade BG Barnard Elliott Bee, Jr. (mw); Col States Rights Gist | 4th Alabama: Col Egbert Jones (mw); 2nd Mississippi: Col William C. Falkner; 11th Mississippi, Companies A and K: Ltc Philip F. Liddell; 6th North Carolina: Col Charles F. Fisher (k); Staunton (Virginia) Artillery: Cpt John Imboden |
| Fourth Brigade BG Edmund Kirby Smith (w); Col Arnold Elzey | 1st Maryland Battalion: Col Arnold Elzey, Ltc George H. Steuart; 3rd Tennessee: Col John C. Vaughn; 10th Virginia: Col Simeon B. Gibbons; Culpeper (Virginia) Artillery: Lt Robert F. Beckham |
| Artillery | Thomas (Virginia) Artillery: Cpt Philip B. Stanard |
| Cavalry | 1st Virginia: Col J. E. B. Stuart |
