= Army of the Shenandoah (Confederate) =

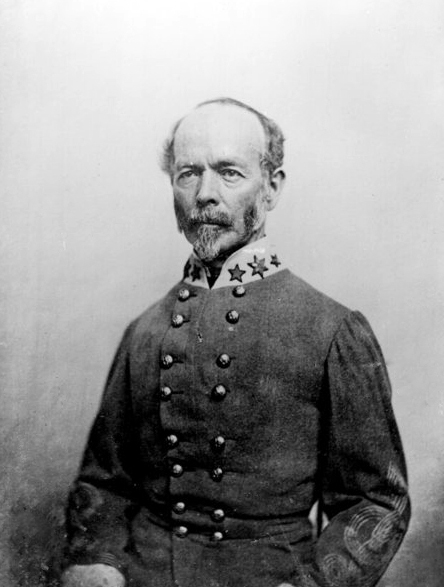
- Joseph E. Johnston
- Active: May 1861 – July 1861
- Country: Confederate States of America
- Allegiance: Virginia
- Branch: Confederate States Army
- Type: Field army
- Role: Confederate army in Eastern Theater
- Engagements: Battle of Hoke's Run; First Battle of Bull Run

Commanders
- Notable commanders: Joseph E. Johnston

The Army of the Shenandoah was a field army of the Confederate States Army active during the American Civil War. It was created to defend the Shenandoah Valley of Virginia from Union army attacks during the early months of the war. The army was transferred to reinforce the Confederate Army of the Potomac at the First Battle of Bull Run, which was the only major engagement of the war it participated in. After the battle, the army was merged into the Army of the Potomac.

== History ==
The Army of the Shenandoah originated with the various militia and volunteer companies sent to seize and defend the town of Harpers Ferry, Virginia (modern day West Virginia). To organize and train the companies, Virginia state commander Robert E. Lee initially appointed Thomas J. Jackson to command the post. Jackson formed five regiments of infantry and a battery of artillery from the various companies, forming the basis of the Stonewall Brigade. On May 15, Joseph E. Johnston replaced Jackson as commander of Harpers Ferry and continued to receive additional regiments from throughout the Confederacy. He would eventually have four brigades of infantry and an independent regiment of cavalry, the 1st Virginia Cavalry commanded by J. E. B. Stuart.

In mid-June, forces from the Union Department of Pennsylvania, commanded by Robert Patterson, began moving south towards Harpers Ferry. Fearing that the terrain around the town made it indefensible, Johnston had the bridges and as much equipment in the town as possible destroyed and retreated south to Winchester; Patterson remained along the Potomac River rather than pursue Johnston. Over the next few weeks, both forces watched each other, only engaging in battle once, at Falling Waters on July 2. After spending almost two weeks waiting on the Potomac and receiving reinforcements, Patterson started advancing towards Winchester but had moved only 5 miles (8.0 km) before encountering Stuart's regiment screening Johnston's army. Patterson halted again and consulted his officers, who advised caution; this advice, along with the refusal of several regiments which were due for mustering out to remain any longer, convinced Patterson to cancel the advance. This allowed Johnston to follow orders he received on July 18 to transfer his army to reinforce P. G. T. Beauregard's Army of the Potomac at Manassas Junction. The movement started that evening, with each brigade marching to Piedmont where it boarded a train for Manassas Junction. Since there was only one train on the Manassas Gap Railroad, the brigades arrived one at a time; the artillery and cavalry marched overland. The final units of Johnston's army arrived on the afternoon of July 21.

Since he was senior to Beauregard, Johnston had command over the two armies present. Before Johnston arrived at Manassas, Beauregard had drawn up plans for an attack on the Union army of Irvin McDowell across Bull Run on July 21, using brigades from both armies, and Johnston approved the plan, allowing Beauregard to issue the necessary orders in his name. However, the orders were vague and contradictory, which confused the brigade commanders and prevented the attack from taking place. On the morning of July 21, McDowell launched his own attack on the Confederate left wing, defended by one of Beauregard's brigades. As the battle escalated in the area of Matthews Hill and Henry House Hill, additional Confederate brigades were moved to the left flank. Eventually, all four of Johnston's brigades and four out of Beauregard's eight brigades were engaged in this area. It was while defending Henry House Hill that Jackson received his nickname of "Stonewall", which also became the name of his brigade.

After the battle Johnston's and Beauregard's commands were consolidated into the Department of Northern Virginia, with their merged army using the name "Army of the Potomac"; Johnston retained command of the army, with Beauregard remaining as second in command until his transfer to the western theater.

== Order of Battle at Manassas ==
Army of the Shenandoah: General Joseph E. Johnston

- First Brigade: Brigadier General Thomas J. Jackson (wounded)
  - 2nd Virginia Infantry – Colonel James W. Allen
  - 4th Virginia Infantry – Colonel James F. Preston
  - 5th Virginia Infantry – Colonel K. Harper
  - 27th Virginia Infantry – Lieutenant Colonel John Echols
  - 33rd Virginia Infantry (8 Cos.) – Colonel Arthur C. Cummings
  - Rockbridge Artillery – Captain J. P. Brockenbrough
- Second Brigade: Colonel Francis Bartow (killed), Colonel Lucius J. Gartrell
  - 7th Georgia Infantry – Colonel L.J. Gartrell (wounded)
  - 8th Georgia Infantry- Lieutenant Colonel W.M. Gardner (wounded)
  - 1st Kentucky Battalion – Maj Thomas Claiborne
  - Pope's Kentucky Battalion – Major Jon Pope
  - Wise Artillery – Lieutenant John Pelham
- Third Brigade: Brigadier General Barnard E. Bee (killed), Colonel States Rights Gist
  - 4th Alabama – Colonel Egbert Jones (mortally wounded), Colonel States Rights Gist
  - 2nd Mississippi– Colonel William C. Falkner
  - 11th Mississippi – (Cos. A&F) – Lieutenant Colonel P.F. Liddell
  - 6th North Carolina – Colonel C.F. Fisher (killed)
  - Staunton Artillery – Captain John D. Imboden
- Fourth Brigade: Brigadier General Edmund Kirby Smith (wounded), Colonel Arnold Elzey
  - 1st Maryland Battalion – Lieutenant Colonel George H. Steuart
  - 3rd Tennessee – Colonel John C. Vaughn
  - 10th Virginia Infantry – Colonel S.B. Gibbons
  - Culpeper Artillery – Lieutenant R. F. Beckham
- Not Brigaded:
  - 1st Virginia Cavalry – Colonel J.E.B. Stuart
  - Thomas Artillery – Captain P.B. Stanard

== See also ==
- First Bull Run Confederate order of battle
