= Peninsula campaign order of battle =

The order of battle for the Peninsula campaign includes:

- Peninsula campaign order of battle: Confederate
- Peninsula campaign order of battle: Union
