= Edward Edmonds =

Edward Claxton Edmonds
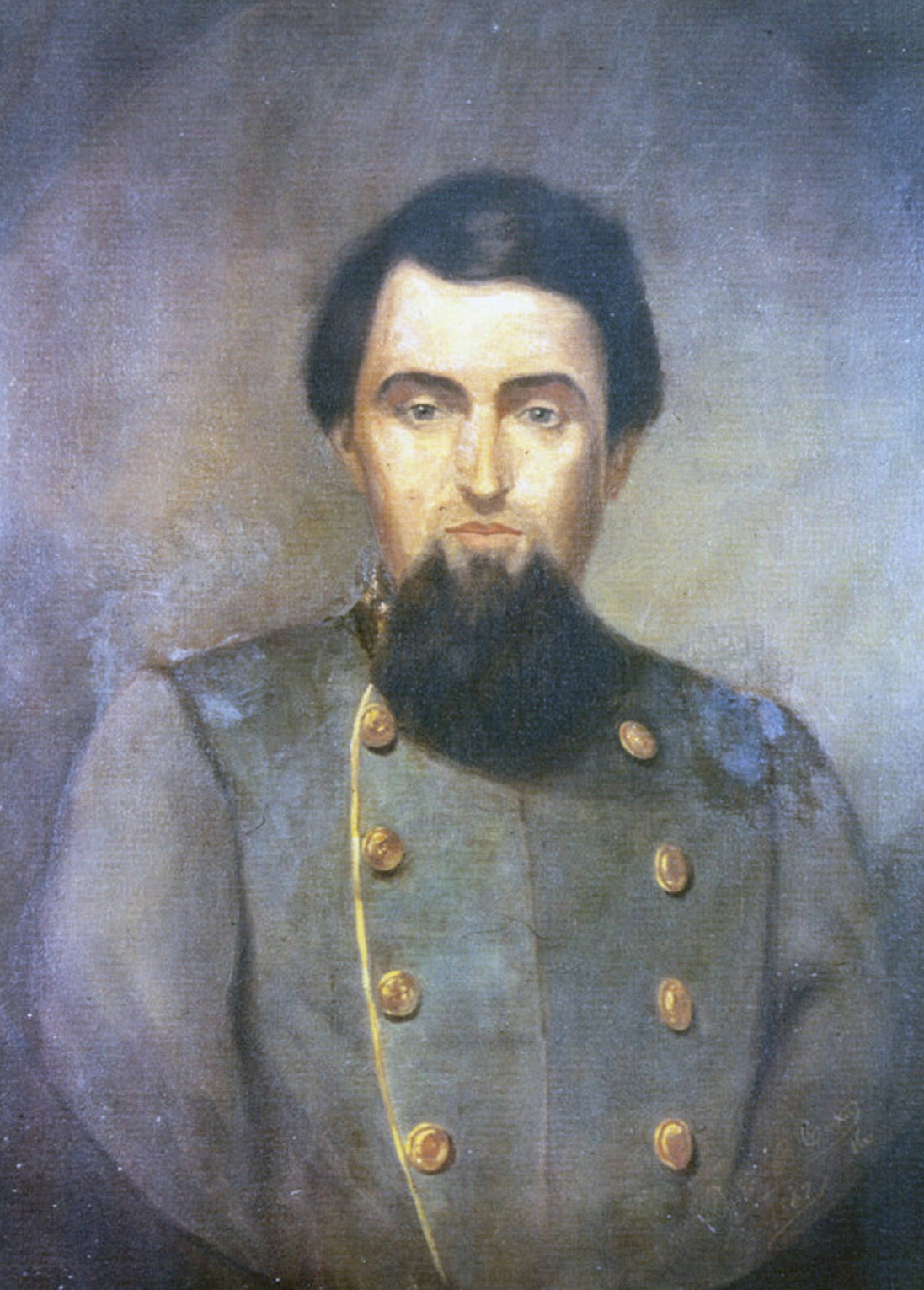
- Edward Edmonds, ca. 1862
- Born: January 21, 1835; Paris, Virginia, US
- Died: July 3, 1863 (aged 28) Gettysburg, Pennsylvania, US
- Buried: Hollywood Cemetery
- Allegiance: Confederate States of America
- Branch: Confederate States Army
- Service years: 1861–1863 (CSA)
- Rank: Colonel
- Commands: 38th Virginia Infantry
- Conflicts: American Civil War; Battle of Williamsburg; Battle of Malvern Hill; Battle of Antietam; Battle of Gettysburg †

Edward Claxton Edmonds (January 21, 1835 – July 3, 1863) was an American military teacher and colonel in the Confederate Army during American Civil War. He commanded the 38th Virginia Infantry and was killed near Gettysburg when he led the regiment on the offensive during Pickett's Charge.

== Early years ==
Edward Claxton Edmonds was born in Paris, Virginia, to Dr. John Edmonds and Ellen Carter Edmonds, who came from the Carter family of Pittsylvania County, Virginia. In the 1850s, the family lived in Alexandria and in September 1854, Edmonds enrolled in the Virginia Military Institute. He graduated on July 4, 1858, in a class of 19 cadets (eight of whom were subsequently killed the Civil War). After graduating, Edmonds spent about a year teaching mathematics at a school in Staunton. On December 29, 1858, he married Margaret Tutwiler (1838–1894) from Fluvanna County, Virginia, and they moved to Danville, where Edmonds co-founded the Danville Military Institute. On May 6, 1860, Edmonds had a daughter, Molly Edmonds (1860–1928).

== Civil War ==
When Virginia withdrew from the Union, Edmonds went to Richmond and offered his services to Governor John Letcher. The governor ordered him to return to Danville and recruit an infantry regiment. Edmonds recruited a regiment by June 12 and returned to Richmond by rail, and on July 1 the regiment was included in the Confederate Army as the 38th Virginia Infantry. Edmonds became the colonel of this regiment. The regiment was attached to the Army of the Shenandoah under the command of Joseph E. Johnston, then transferred to Manassas arriving after the First Battle of Bull Run.

In the autumn of 1861 and in the spring of 1862 Edmonds regiment was attached to the brigade of Jubal Early, and in May 1862 took part in the Battle of Williamsburg. On May 31, Edmonds was injured in the Battle of Seven Pines, and on July 1 at the Battle of Malvern Hill. In September 1862 the regiment was involved in the Battle of Antietam and in December in the Battle of Fredericksburg. In the spring of 1862, the regiment participated in an expedition to Suffolk, missing the Battle of Chancellorsville.

On the third day Battle of Gettysburg, the regiment took part in Pickett's Charge part of the Armistead Brigade. The regiment was positioned on the extreme left flank of the brigade, and when the left-leaning division of Isaac R. Trimble began to retreat, the regiment was threatened with a blow to the flank. Colonel Edmonds decided to turn the regiment to protect the flank, but was at that moment killed by a bullet in the head. Command passed to Major Joseph Cabbell, as Lieutenant-Colonel Powhatan Whittle was already wounded in the shoulder and arm, who was unable to deploy the regiment and ordered him to retreat behind the Emmitsberg road. During the retreat, the flag of the regiment was lost, which was picked up by soldiers of the 8th Ohio Infantry.

The brigade believing that Edmonds had been taken prisoner drafted a petition to the Military Department for his appointment as brigade commander following the death of Armistead.

The exact location of Edmonds remains is unknown, though he was believed to have been reinterred along with other Confederate soldiers from the Gettysburg battlefield at Hollywood Cemetery in Richmond in 1872.
