= First Battle of Bull Run order of battle: Union =

The following units and commanders fought in the First Battle of Bull Run on the Union side. The Confederate order of battle is shown separately. Order of battle compiled from the army organization during the battle and the reports.

== Abbreviations used ==
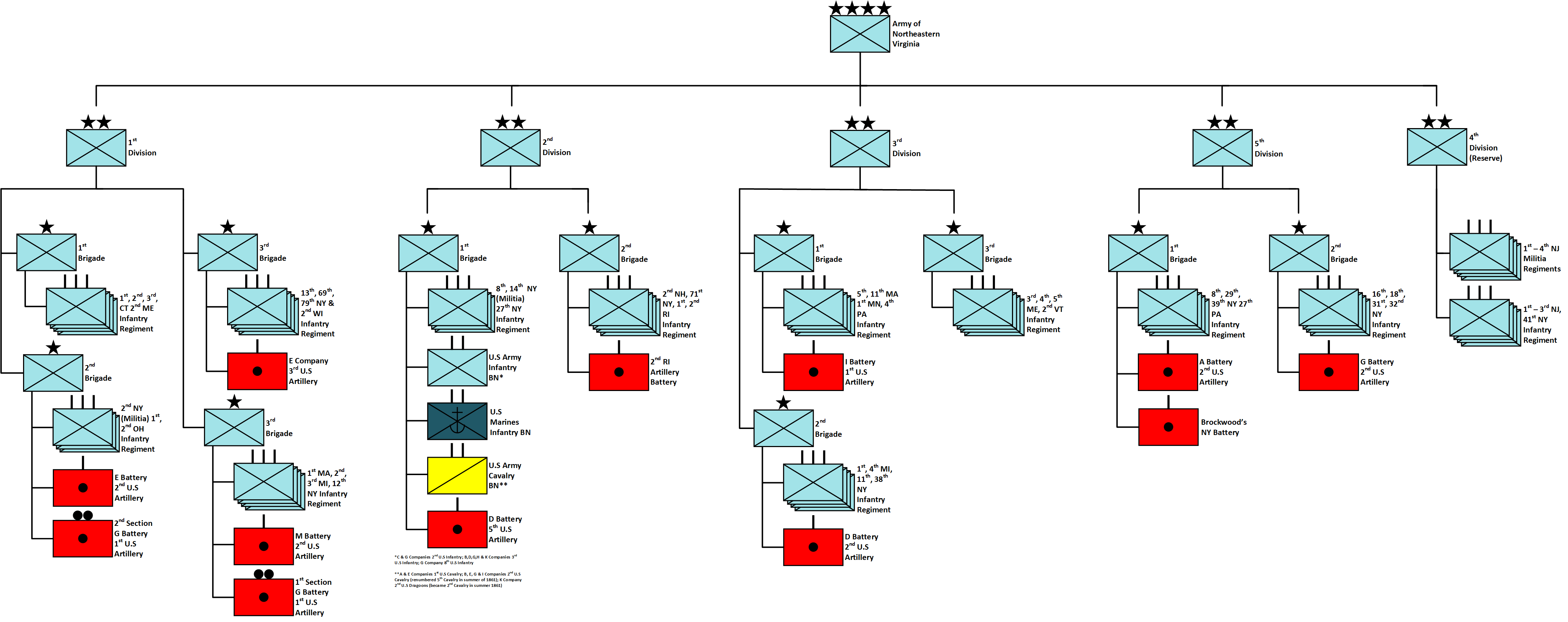
Organization of the Union Army of Northeastern Virginia in the First Battle of Bull Run

=== Military rank ===
- BG = Brigadier General
- Col = Colonel
- Ltc = Lieutenant Colonel
- Maj = Major
- Cpt = Captain
- Lt = Lieutenant

=== Other ===
- w = wounded
- mw = mortally wounded
- k = killed
- c = captured

== Army of Northeastern Virginia ==
BG Irvin McDowell, Commanding

General Staff:

- Chief of Artillery: Maj William F. Barry
- Chief Engineer: Maj John G. Barnard
- Chief Quartermaster: Cpt Otis H. Tillinghast (mw)

| Division | Brigade | Regiments and Others |
|---|---|---|
| First Division BG Daniel Tyler | First Brigade Col Erasmus D. Keyes | 1st Connecticut: Ltc John Speidel; 2nd Connecticut: Col Alfred H. Terry; 3rd Connecticut: Col John L. Chatfield; 2nd Maine: Col Charles D. Jameson |
| First Division BG Daniel Tyler | Second Brigade BG Robert C. Schenck | 2nd New York (Militia): Col George W. B. Tompkins; 1st Ohio: Col Alexander M. McCook; 2nd Ohio: Ltc Rodney Mason; 1st United States Artillery, Company G (Second Section): Lt Peter C. Hains; 2nd United States Artillery, Company E: Cpt James H. Carlisle |
| First Division BG Daniel Tyler | Third Brigade Col William T. Sherman | 13th New York: Col Isaac F. Quinby; 69th New York: Col Michael Corcoran (w&c), Cpt James Kelly; 79th New York: Col James Cameron (k); 2nd Wisconsin: Ltc Henry W. Peck; 3rd United States Artillery, Company E: Cpt Romeyn B. Ayres |
| First Division BG Daniel Tyler | Fourth Brigade Col Israel B. Richardson | 1st Massachusetts: Col Robert Cowdin; 2nd Michigan: Maj Adolphus W. Williams; 3rd Michigan: Col Daniel McConnell, Ltc Ambrose A. Stevens; 12th New York: Col Ezra L. Walrath; 1st United States Artillery, Company G (First Section): Lt John Edwards Jr.; 2nd United States Artillery, Company M: Cpt Henry J. Hunt |
| Second Division Col David Hunter (w); Col Andrew Porter | First Brigade Col Andrew Porter | 8th New York (Militia): Col George Lyons; 14th New York (Militia): Col Alfred M. Wood (w), Ltc Edward B. Fowler; 27th New York: Col Henry W. Slocum (w), Maj Joseph J. Bartlett; United States Infantry Battalion (8 companies): Maj George Sykes; United States Marine Corps Battalion (4 companies): Maj John G. Reynolds; United States Cavalry Battalion (7 companies): Maj Innis N. Palmer; 5th United States Artillery, Company D: Cpt Charles Griffin |
| Second Division Col David Hunter (w); Col Andrew Porter | Second Brigade Col Ambrose Burnside | 2nd New Hampshire: Col Gilman Marston (w), Ltc Frank S. Fiske; 71st New York: Col Henry P. Martin; 1st Rhode Island: Maj Joseph P. Balch; 2nd Rhode Island: Col John S. Slocum (k), Ltc Frank Wheaton; 2nd Rhode Island Battery: Cpt William H. Reynolds |
| Third Division Col Samuel P. Heintzelman (w) | First Brigade Col William B. Franklin | 5th Massachusetts: Col Samuel C. Lawrence (w); 11th Massachusetts: Col George Clark Jr.; 1st Minnesota: Col Willis A. Gorman; 4th Pennsylvania (not present at battle): Col John F. Hartranft; 1st United States Artillery, Battery I: Cpt James B. Ricketts (w/c), Lt Edmund Kirby |
| Third Division Col Samuel P. Heintzelman (w) | Second Brigade Col Orlando B. Willcox (w&c); Col J. H. Hobart Ward | 1st Michigan: Maj Alonzo F. Bidwell; 4th Michigan: Col Dwight A. Woodbury; 11th New York: Col Noah L. Farnham (mw); 38th New York: Col J. H. Hobart Ward, Ltc Addison Farnsworth; 2nd United States Artillery, Company D: Cpt Richard Arnold |
| Third Division Col Samuel P. Heintzelman (w) | Third Brigade Col Oliver O. Howard | 3rd Maine: Maj Henry G. Staples; 4th Maine: Col Hiram G. Berry; 5th Maine: Col Mark H. Dunnell; 2nd Vermont: Col Henry Whiting |
| Fourth (Reserve) Division BG Theodore Runyon | no brigade organization | 1st New Jersey Militia: Col Aldolphus J. Johnson; 2nd New Jersey Militia: Col Henry M. Baker; 3rd New Jersey Militia: Col William Napton; 4th New Jersey Militia: Col Matthew Miller Jr.; 1st New Jersey: Col William R. Montgomery; 2nd New Jersey: Col George W. McLean; 3rd New Jersey: Col George W. Taylor; 41st New York: Col Leopold von Gilsa |
| Fifth Division Col Dixon S. Miles | First Brigade Col Louis Blenker | 8th New York: Ltc Julius Stahel; 29th New York: Col Adolph von Steinwehr; 39th New York: Col Frederick G. D'Utassy; 27th Pennsylvania: Col Max Einstein; 2nd United States Artillery, Company A: Cpt John C. Tidball; Brookwood's New York Battery: Cpt Charles Brookwood |
| Fifth Division Col Dixon S. Miles | Second Brigade Col Thomas A. Davies | 16th New York: Ltc Samuel Marsh; 18th New York: Col William A. Jackson; 31st New York: Col Calvin E. Pratt; 32nd New York: Col Roderick N. Matheson; 2nd United States Artillery, Company G: Lt Oliver D. Greene |
