= William S. Baylor =

American lawyer and Confederate officer of the Civil War (1831-1862)

William Smith Hanger Baylor
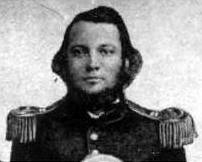
- Colonel Baylor
- Born: April 7, 1831; Augusta County, Virginia
- Died: August 30, 1862 (aged 31) Prince William County, Virginia
- Buried: Hebron Cemetery, Augusta County, Virginia
- Allegiance: Confederate States of America
- Branch: Confederate States Army
- Rank: Colonel; Brigadier General (unconfirmed)
- Commands: 5th Virginia Infantry; Stonewall Brigade
- Conflicts: American Civil War: Second Battle of Bull Run †

William Smith Hanger Baylor (April 7, 1831 – August 30, 1862) was an American lawyer and soldier who served as a colonel in the Confederate States Army during the American Civil War.

Before the war, Baylor commanded a militia company, the West Augusta Guard, which later became Company L of the 5th Virginia Infantry Regiment. In April 1862, he was appointed colonel of the regiment. He assumed command of the Stonewall Brigade after the death of Brigadier General Charles S. Winder on August 9, 1862, at Cedar Mountain. Before his promotion to brigadier general could be confirmed, Baylor was killed in action on the afternoon of August 30, 1862, at Second Manassas after taking the colors of the 33rd Virginia Infantry and gallantly leading his brigade to the unfinished railroad in a charge against the Union V Corps. General William B. Taliaferro said, "No more exalted recognition of his worth and services can be uttered and no higher tribute can be paid him than to declare that he was worthy of the command of the Stonewall Brigade".

== Sources ==
1. The National Park Service has established these dates for the battle. The references by Greene, Hennessy, Salmon, and Kennedy (whose works are closely aligned with the NPS) adopt these dates as well. However, all of the other references to this article specify that the action on August 28 was a battle separate from the Second Battle of Bull Run. Some of these authors name the action on August 28 the Battle of Groveton, Brawner's Farm, or Gainesville.

2. Herdegen, pp. 91–92; Hennessy, pp. 173–80; Greene, p. 21; Salmon, p. 147.

3. Salmon, p. 150; Hennessy, pp. 339–57; Greene, pp. 41–43.

4. Staunton VA Biographies
