= 5th Virginia Infantry Regiment =

Confederate States Army military unit

- Flag of Virginia, 1861
- Active: May 1861 – Spring 1865
- Disbanded: 1865
- Country: Confederate States of America
- Allegiance: Virginia
- Branch: Confederate States Army
- Type: Regiment
- Role: Infantry
- Engagements: American Civil War: First Battle of Bull Run; Battle of Kernstown I; Jackson's Valley Campaign; Battle of Malvern Hill; Second Battle of Bull Run; Battle of Chancellorsville; Battle of Aldie; Battle of Gettysburg

Commanders
- Notable commanders: Col. William S. Baylor; Col. Kenton Harper

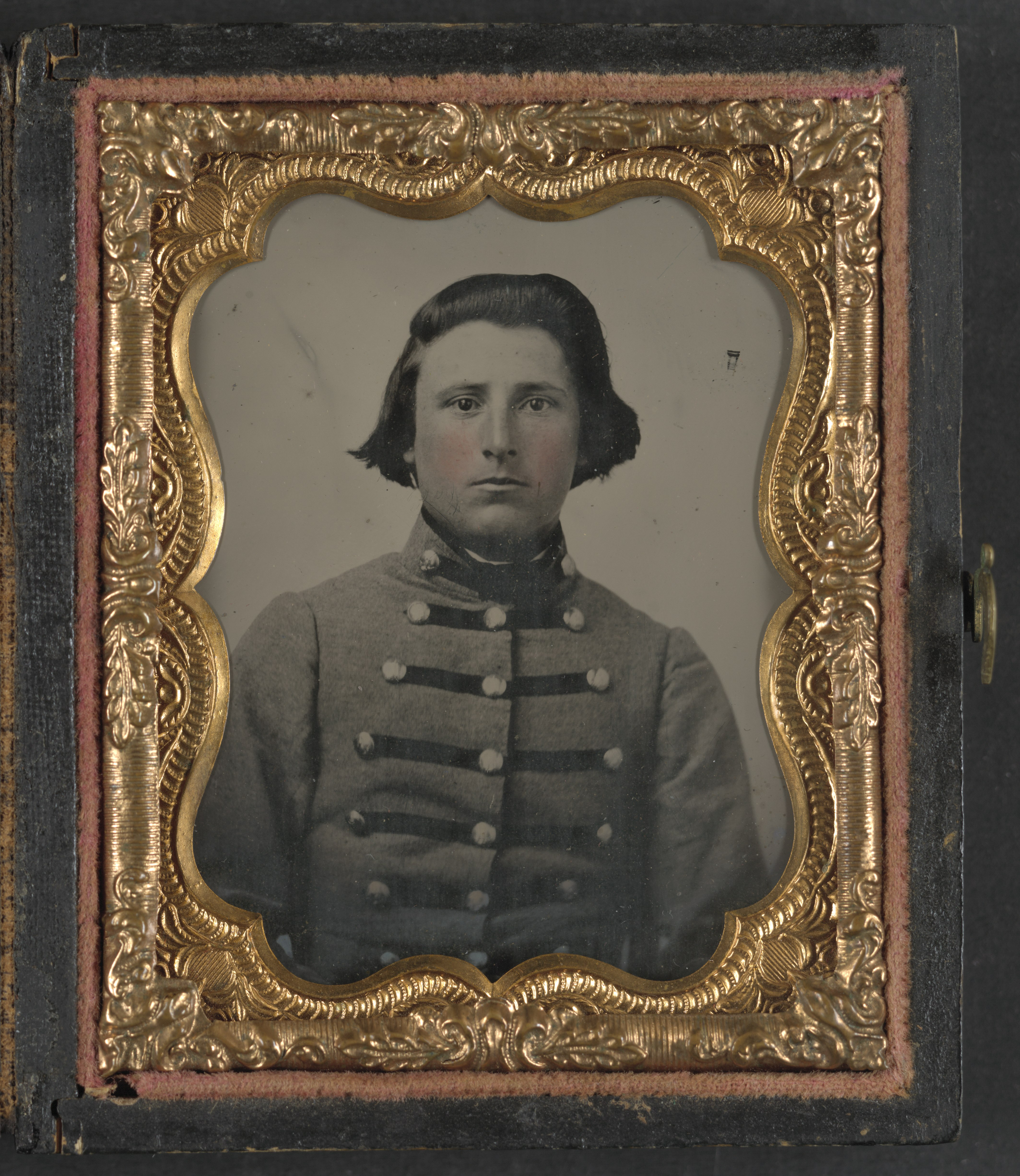
Private James B. McCutchan of Co. D, 5th Virginia Infantry Regiment Private Peter Lauck Kurtz of Company A, 5th Virginia Infantry Regiment

The 5th Virginia Infantry Regiment was an infantry regiment raised in Virginia for service in the Confederate States Army during the American Civil War. It fought in the Stonewall Brigade, mostly with the Army of Northern Virginia. The regiment was known as the "Fighting Fifth".

The 5th Virginia Infantry Regiment was organized in May, 1861, under Colonel Kenton Harper. Eight companies were from Augusta County and two from Frederick County. The unit became part of the Stonewall Brigade and served under Generals T.J. Jackson, Richard B. Garnett, Charles Sidney Winder, Elisha F. Paxton, James A. Walker and William Terry.

It saw action at First Manassas, First Kernstown, and in Jackson's Valley Campaign. Later the 5th participated in the campaigns of the Army of Northern Virginia from the Seven Days' Battles to Cold Harbor, then was active in Early's Shenandoah Valley operations and around Appomattox.

It reported 9 killed, 48 wounded, and 4 missing at First Kernstown, had 4 killed, 89 wounded, and 20 missing at Cross Keys and the Port Republic, and suffered 14 killed and 91 wounded at Second Manassas. The unit sustained 120 casualties at Chancellorsville and of the 345 engaged at Gettysburg, sixteen percent were disabled. It surrendered 8 officers and 248 men.

The field officers were Colonels William S.H. Baylor, John H.S. Funk, William H. Harman, and Kenton Harper; Lieutenant Colonel Hazael J. Williams; and Majors Absalom Koiner and James W. Newton.

== See also ==
- List of Virginia Civil War units
