= William Terry (Virginia politician) =

American politician, lawyer, teacher, and soldier

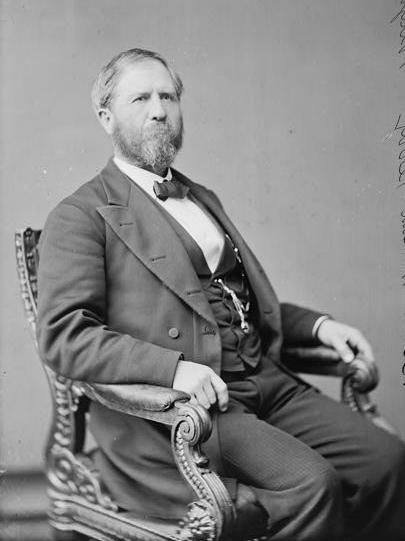

Member of the U.S. House of Representatives from Virginia's 8th district
- In office March 4, 1871 – March 3, 1873
- Preceded by: James K. Gibson
- Succeeded by: Eppa Hunton

Member of the U.S. House of Representatives from Virginia's 9th district
- In office March 4, 1875 – March 3, 1877
- Preceded by: Rees Bowen
- Succeeded by: Auburn Pridemore

Personal details
- Born: August 14, 1824 Amherst County, Virginia, U.S.
- Died: September 5, 1888 (aged 64) Wytheville, Virginia, U.S.
- Resting place: East End Cemetery; Wytheville, Virginia, U.S.
- Party: Conservative (before c. 1875); Democrat
- Spouse: Emma Wigginton (m. 1852)
- Children: 7
- Profession: Politician; Lawyer; Teacher; Soldier

Military service
- Allegiance: Virginia; Confederate States of America
- Branch/service: Virginia Militia; Confederate States Army
- Years of service: 1861–65
- Rank: 1st Lieutenant (Virginia Militia); Brigadier General
- Commands: 4th Virginia Infantry; Stonewall Brigade
- Battles/wars: American Civil War

William Terry (August 14, 1824 – September 5, 1888) was a nineteenth-century politician, lawyer, teacher, slaveowner, and Confederate soldier from Virginia. The last commander of the famed Stonewall Brigade during the American Civil War also twice won election to the U.S. House of Representatives after the conflict.

== Early and family life ==
Born in Amherst County, Virginia, to the former Katherine Robinson (1795-1867) and her husband Thomas Terry (1793-1874), Terry could trace his lineage on both sides to soldiers who had fought in the American Revolutionary War. He received a private education suitable for his class and went on to graduate from the University of Virginia in 1848. After graduation, he boarded with a local farming family and taught school in Liberty, the county seat of Bedford County, as he read law.

In 1852, Terry married one of the daughters of the family with whom he boarded, Emma Wigginton (1828-1909), and they would raise four sons (the eldest of whom, Benjamin, would become a lawyer by 1880) and three daughters before his death.

== Career ==
Admitted to the bar in 1851, Terry began his private legal practice in Wytheville, the county seat of Wythe County. He also engaged in newspaper work for eighteen months as editor and co-owner of the Wytheville Telegraph. By 1860, he owned 5 enslaved individuals, a 38 year old Black man, a 25 year old mulatto woman, and mulatto girls ages 8, 6 and 4.

Terry joined the local militia, as lieutenant of the "Wythe Grays." He led his company to Harpers Ferry during the John Brown affair in 1859.

== Civil War ==
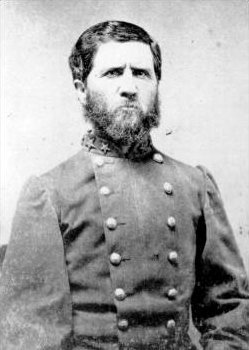
General William Terry

Following Virginia's secession from the Union, Terry enrolled in the Confederate Army as a first lieutenant in the 4th Virginia Infantry. In April 1861, he returned to Harpers Ferry, this time as a Confederate officer serving under Stonewall Jackson. He saw his first significant combat in the First Battle of Bull Run. Terry was promoted to major in the spring of 1862 and fought in the Peninsula Campaign at the battles of Gaines' Mill and Malvern Hill. He was wounded in the Second Battle of Bull Run and was cited for gallantry in the official report of his superior, William Taliaferro. He returned to the ranks to lead the 4th Virginia Infantry at the Battle of Fredericksburg. His regiment lost 140 of its 335 men in fierce fighting at Chancellorsville, but Terry escaped injury there, as well as in fighting at Culp's Hill at Gettysburg, although the brigade suffered heavy losses.

In February 1864, he was promoted to colonel, to date from September 1863. He was commissioned as a brigadier general on May 20, 1864, following the Wilderness Campaign. The following day, he was assigned command of a brigade formed from the survivors of the Stonewall Brigade and the badly depleted brigades of John M. Jones and George H. Steuart. Terry led the consolidated unit in the fighting at Cold Harbor and the defense of Petersburg.

He commanded his brigade during Jubal A. Early's 1864 campaign in the Shenandoah Valley. Terry's hard-hitting final assault at the Battle of Monocacy finally broke the Union line and forced the withdrawal of Lew Wallace's army. Later that year, Terry was one of seven Confederate generals who were killed or wounded at the Third Battle of Winchester. Recovering, he led the brigade back to Petersburg, where he was again wounded on March 25, 1865, when Gordon's Corps attacked Fort Stedman. Terry was taken to his home in Wytheville to recover from his injuries.

As a result, he missed the surrender of the Army of Northern Virginia at Appomattox Court House in April. When news arrived, he mounted his horse and started southward to join the army of Joseph E. Johnston in North Carolina. However, Terry returned home when news arrived of Johnston's surrender at Bennett Place.

== Postbellum years ==
After the war, though partially disabled from his three Civil War wounds, Terry resumed his legal practice in Wytheville. He was nominated for Congress in 1868, but, being under political disabilities, he withdrew. Following a pardon, easily won election as a Conservative to the United States House of Representatives in 1870, serving from 1871 to 1873, but lost his campaign for reelection in 1872. Terry was re-elected to Congress in 1874 and served again from 1875 to 1877, being unsuccessful for reelection again in 1876. He was a delegate to the Democratic National Convention in 1880 and afterwards resumed practicing law.

== Death and legacy ==
Terry drowned on September 5, 1888, while attempting to ford Reed Creek near Wytheville after returning from the Grayson County Courthouse. He was interred in the town's East End Cemetery, where his widow would join him decades later.

The William Terry Camp of the United Confederate Veterans in Bedford County, Virginia was not named after him, but after a third-generation native of Bedford County, who also became a CSA General, William R. Terry (1824-1889).

== See also ==
- List of American Civil War generals (Confederate)

== Notes ==
Military offices
Preceded by James A. Walker	Commander of the Stonewall Brigade; May 20, 1864 – end of Civil War	Succeeded by (none)
U.S. House of Representatives
Preceded by James K. Gibson	Member of the U.S. House of Representatives from Virginia's 8th congressional district March 4, 1871 – March 3, 1873	Succeeded by Eppa Hunton
Preceded by Rees Bowen	Member of the U.S. House of Representatives from Virginia's 9th congressional district March 4, 1875 – March 3, 1877	Succeeded by Auburn Pridemore
