= Stonewall Brigade =

Infantry brigade of the Confederate States Army

The Stonewall Brigade was an infantry formation of the Confederate States Army in the Eastern Theater of the American Civil War. It was initially commanded by Brigadier General Thomas J. "Stonewall" Jackson, a professor from Virginia Military Institute (VMI). His severe training program and ascetic standards of military discipline turned enthusiastic but raw recruits into an effective military organization, which distinguished itself from the First Battle of Bull Run (First Manassas) in 1861 to Spotsylvania Court House in 1864. Its legacy lives on in the 116th Infantry Brigade, which bears the unofficial nickname "Stonewall Brigade," and in several living history reenactment groups.

== History ==
=== 1861 ===
The brigade was formed by Jackson at Harpers Ferry, April 27, 1861, from the 2nd, 4th, 5th, 27th, and 33rd Virginia Infantry regiments and the Rockbridge Artillery Battery of Rockbridge County, 1 unit recruited in or near the Shenandoah Valley of Virginia. Thirteen companies of the brigade were recruited from western counties that would become part of West Virginia. It was officially assigned to the Virginia Provisional Army, then to the Army of the Shenandoah on May 15, and the Valley District on July 20.

The Stonewall Brigade was initially armed with weapons captured from the arsenal at Harpers Ferry; its regiments went to First Bull Run carrying a wide range of muskets from Model 1816/1822 muskets converted to percussion to modern Model 1855 rifles to VMI cadet muskets (a Model 1842 musket downsized to .58 caliber). Company K of the 33rd Virginia, the Shenandoah Sharpshooters, had the misfortune of getting flintlock muskets. In September, Jackson received a request from Virginia governor John Letcher asking for the return of the VMI muskets (carried primarily by Company H of the 4th Virginia, known as the "Rockbridge Grays"). Jackson replied back that the muskets could not be returned until better weapons became available.

Jackson's brigade was referred to informally as "Virginia's First Brigade" until July 21, 1861, when, at First Manassas, both the brigade and its general received the nickname "Stonewall". General Barnard E. Bee of South Carolina is said to have made his immortal remark as he rallied his brigade for the final phase of the battle. Although the exact words were not recorded at the time, he probably said, "There stands Jackson like a stone wall. Rally behind the Virginians!" This is considered the turning point of the first major battle of the American Civil War, and the Union troops were repulsed and sent reeling back toward Washington D.C. in defeat. Jackson was promoted to higher command, but the brigade remained under his overall command until his death. Upon Jackson's promotion, he was replaced as brigade commander by Brig. Gen. Richard B. Garnett that fall.

In the fall of 1861, Jackson was promoted to division command and reassigned to the Shenandoah Valley and Potomac River area, where they overwintered. During this time, a trickle of better weapons reached the Stonewall Brigade as Confederate agents began purchasing rifles from Europe. However, the brigade still had a large number of smoothbore muskets until the Gettysburg Campaign, by which time the majority of its men had .58 caliber rifles.

=== 1862 ===
On March 13, 1862, the Valley District was incorporated into the Army of Northern Virginia, under General Joseph E. Johnston. Jackson and the Stonewall Brigade operated in the Valley as part of the left wing of Johnston's army. During Jackson's Valley Campaign, Jackson's only defeat of the Civil War occurred at the First Battle of Kernstown on March 25, 1862. After receiving faulty intelligence, the brigade was ordered to attack a much larger Union force. Out of ammunition and almost surrounded by the superior force, Garnett ordered a withdrawal. Jackson was infuriated by this action, taken without his explicit permission, and Garnett was relieved of command and subject to court martial (Garnett was later killed during Pickett's Charge in the Battle of Gettysburg, attempting to restore his military honor).

For the remainder of the Valley Campaign, Brig. Gen. Charles S. Winder commanded the brigade and there were no more defeats in store. The brigade marched over 400 miles in four weeks, was victorious in six significant battles, and helped Jackson achieve a strategic victory in the Eastern Theater. The brigade's mobility in the campaign (particularly a 57-mile march in 51 hours) earned it the oxymoronic title "Jackson's foot cavalry".

At the end of the Valley Campaign, the brigade moved to reinforce General Robert E. Lee in the Seven Days Battles on the Virginia Peninsula. In the Battle of Gaines' Mill, the brigade assaulted the Federal right and helped Lee achieve a victory. In the Northern Virginia Campaign, the brigade suffered high casualties at the Battle of Cedar Mountain and General Winder was killed on August 9, 1862. Jackson personally rallied his old brigade and won the battle. The brigade would suffer more casualties in the Second Battle of Bull Run. On August 30, 1862, the Stonewall Brigade repulsed the attack of the Union's Iron Brigade and rallied for a counterattack. Its acting commander, Colonel William S. Baylor, was killed. Colonel Andrew J. Grigsby assumed command and led the brigade through the Maryland Campaign and the Battle of Antietam. The brigade defended the West Woods, where the fighting was so severe and attrition so high that Grigsby was commanding the division ("Jackson's Division") by the end of the day.

Grigsby did not receive permanent command of the brigade, for reasons Jackson did not record. Instead, Brig. Gen. Elisha F. Paxton, former commander of the 27th Virginia Infantry, moved from Jackson's staff to brigade command, which he performed in the Battle of Fredericksburg. There, under the division command of William B. Taliaferro, the brigade was on the right flank of the Confederate defense and counterattacked the encroaching Union division of George G. Meade, but was overall lightly engaged.

In 1862, casualties in the brigade surpassed 1,200.

=== 1863 ===
At Chancellorsville, the brigade was part of Isaac R. Trimble's division and participated in Stonewall Jackson's audacious flanking movement of May 2, 1863. The brigade attacked on the Union right flank along the Orange Plank Road, falling in behind J.E.B. Stuart's cavalry. More than 600 men out of 2,000 were killed or wounded, and among the killed was General Paxton. This was the same night that Stonewall Jackson was mortally wounded. As Jackson and his staff were returning to camp on May 2, they were mistaken for a Union cavalry force by a Confederate North Carolina regiment who shouted, "Halt, who goes there?," but fired before evaluating the reply. Jackson was hit by three bullets, two in the left arm and one in the right hand. The men of the brigade were devastated to learn that their commander had been struck down by friendly fire and they renewed their attacks on May 3 with extra determination. The commander of the 13th Virginia, Colonel James A. Walker, was promoted to brigadier general to replace Paxton.

In the Gettysburg campaign, the brigade was part of Edward "Allegheny" Johnson's division. At the Second Battle of Winchester, the brigade launched a spirited counterattack at Stephenson's Depot that captured six Union regiments. The brigade arrived in the evening of the first day of the Battle of Gettysburg, July 1, 1863, too late to participate in the day's fighting. Early on July 2, the Stonewall Brigade was assigned to screen the Confederate left flank, sparring with Union skirmishers on Wolf's Hill. Later, they fought Brigadier General David M. Gregg's division of Union cavalry for control of Brinkerhoff's Ridge, east of Gettysburg along the Hanover Pike. Repositioned to the base of Culp's Hill before dawn on July 3, the 4th, 5th, 27th, and 33rd Virginia regiments participated in multiple unsuccessful assaults on Union entrenchments. The 2nd Virginia was dispatched to cover the Confederate flank near Spangler's Spring and on Wolf's Hill, where they fended off probes by the First Potomac Home Brigade, and the Union brigades led by Colonel Silas Colgrove and Brigadier General Thomas Neill.

=== 1864 ===
In the Overland Campaign, at the Battle of the Wilderness, the brigade fought along the Orange Courthouse Turnpike. At Spotsylvania Court House, the brigade was on the left flank of the "Mule Shoe" salient, in the part of the line known as the "Bloody Angle", where Winfield S. Hancock's II Corps launched a massive assault. All but 200 men of the brigade were killed, wounded, or were among the 6,000 captured Confederates following the bloody hand-to-hand fighting. The prisoners included Johnson, the division commander, while Walker was seriously wounded. The Stonewall Brigade was officially dissolved after Spotsylvania and consolidated into a single regiment.

The remaining regiment fought as part of Brig. Gen. William Terry's brigade (which itself was the remnant of the Stonewall Division) in the Valley Campaigns of 1864 under Jubal A. Early. It figured prominently in the Battle of Monocacy on July 9, 1864, routing the Union defenders and opening the road to Washington. Early's army was eventually defeated in the Valley by Philip Sheridan at the Battle of Cedar Creek and they rejoined Robert E. Lee and the Army of Northern Virginia for the Siege of Petersburg and the Appomattox Campaign. Of the 6,000 men who served in the Stonewall brigade during the war, by the time of the surrender at Appomattox Court House, only 219 soldiers were left, none above the rank of captain.

== Commanding officers ==
Brig. Gen. Thomas J. "Stonewall" Jackson	April 27, 1861 – October 28, 1861	Died May 10, 1863 after Chancellorsville	West Point 1846
Brig. Gen. Richard B. Garnett	November 14, 1861 – March 25, 1862	KIA July 3, 1863 at Gettysburg	West Point 1841
Brig. Gen. Charles Sidney Winder	March 25, 1862 – August 9, 1862	KIA August 9, 1862 at Cedar Mountain	West Point 1850
Col. William S. Baylor	August 9, 1862 – August 30, 1862	KIA August 30, 1862 at Second Manassas	VA Militia
Col. Andrew J. Grigsby	August 30, 1862 – November 6, 1862	Survived the war	Washington College
Brig. Gen. Elisha F. Paxton	November 6, 1862 – May 3, 1863	KIA May 3, 1863 at Chancellorsville	Washington College
Brig. Gen. James A. Walker	May 14, 1863 – May 12, 1864	Survived the war	VMI 1852
Brig. Gen. William Terry	May 20, 1864 – April 9, 1865	Survived the war	UVA 1848, VA Militia

== Legacy ==
The military lineage of the brigade has reached modern times in the form of the 116th Infantry Regiment, formerly the 1st Brigade "The Stonewall Brigade" of the 29th Infantry Division (Light), Virginia Army National Guard, which counts historical ties to the 5th Virginia Infantry, one of the five original regiments in the Civil War Stonewall Brigade. As a result of US Army modularization, the 1st Brigade is now the 116th Infantry Brigade Combat Team. The brigade's colors carry battle streamers for the Stonewall Brigade's actions in the Civil War.

== See also ==
- List of Virginia Civil War units
- Stonewall Brigade Band
