= James A. Walker =

American politician (1832–1901)

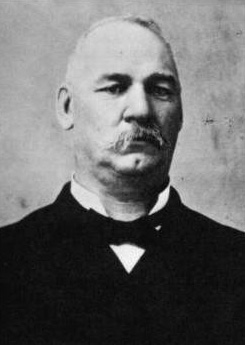

Member of the U.S. House of Representatives from Virginia's 9th district
- In office March 4, 1895 – March 3, 1899
- Preceded by: James W. Marshall
- Succeeded by: William F. Rhea

13th Lieutenant Governor of Virginia
- In office January 1, 1878 – January 1, 1882
- Governor: Frederick W. M. Holliday
- Preceded by: Henry W. Thomas
- Succeeded by: John F. Lewis

Member of the Virginia House of Delegates from Pulaski County
- In office December 6, 1871 – January 1, 1874
- Preceded by: William J. Wall
- Succeeded by: John B. Alexander

Personal details
- Born: James Alexander Walker; August 27, 1832 Augusta County, Virginia, U.S.
- Died: October 21, 1901 (aged 69) Wytheville, Virginia, U.S.
- Party: Republican (1893–1901); Democratic (before 1893)
- Spouse: Sarah A. Poage (m.1858)
- Children: 6
- Education: Virginia Military Institute; University of Virginia
- Nickname: "Stonewall Jim"

Military service
- Allegiance: Confederate States
- Branch/service: Confederate States Army
- Years of service: 1861–1865
- Rank: Brigadier General
- Unit: 4th Virginia Infantry
- Commands: 13th Virginia Infantry; Stonewall Brigade; Early`s Division
- Battles/wars: American Civil War

James Alexander Walker (August 27, 1832 – October 21, 1901) was an American lawyer, politician, and Confederate general during the American Civil War, later serving as a United States Congressman for two terms. He earned the nickname "Stonewall Jim" for his days as commander of the famed Stonewall Brigade. Walker is the first graduate of the Virginia Military Institute (Class of 1852) to serve as Lieutenant Governor of Virginia. He was expelled from the Institute weeks before graduation in 1852 amidst a bitter dispute with then-mathematics professor Thomas Jackson, but was granted his degree in 1872 in recognition of his military service in the American Civil War.

== Early life ==
Walker was born near Mount Meridian in Augusta County, Virginia on August 27, 1832. He attended private schools as a youth and attended the Virginia Military Institute. In 1852, while in the class of Natural and Experimental Philosophy under then-Major Thomas Jackson, Cadet Walker perceived that Jackson was challenging his integrity. He therefore refused to follow a directive of Jackson to sit down and "stop talking" unless Jackson would also stop talking. Jackson excused Walker from class and charged him with disobeying an order. Cadet Walker, a cadet officer who would have graduated in only weeks, challenged Jackson to a duel to defend his honor. Walker was court-martialed and expelled from the Institute for insubordination to an officer.

Following his expulsion from VMI, Walker studied law at the University of Virginia in 1854 and 1855, where he was a member of Phi Kappa Psi fraternity, before being admitted to the Virginia state bar the following year. He established a successful law practice in Newbern in Pulaski County. In 1858 he married Sarah A. Poage of Augusta County, Virginia. The couple would have six children. He became an attorney for the Commonwealth in 1860.

== Civil War ==
With the outbreak of the Civil War and Virginia's eventual secession, Walker entered the Confederate Army in April 1861 as captain of the "Pulaski Guards", which soon became Company C of the 4th Virginia Infantry. In July 1861, he was promoted to lieutenant colonel and assigned to the 13th Virginia Infantry. Walker was again promoted, this time to colonel, in March 1862, leading his regiment in several actions. At Gaines Mill, he assumed brigade command after Brig. Gen Arnold Elzey was wounded. However, after only four days, Walker was replaced by the more experienced Jubal Early, who was just returning to action after a wound suffered at Williamsburg two months earlier. His regiment became a part of the Second Corps under command of Lt. Gen. Thomas Jackson. During the Maryland Campaign Walker was acting as brigade commander for the wounded Isaac Trimble; but he was wounded himself at the Battle of Antietam. At the Battle of Fredericksburg he acted as brigade commander for Jubal Early. General Jackson, on his deathbed after being shot by friendly fire at the Battle of Chancellorsville, requested that Walker be given command of the Stonewall Brigade, which Jackson had formed and led first. Walker was promoted to brigadier general and assigned to the Stonewall Brigade in May 1863.

He led it during the Gettysburg campaign, where the brigade participated in the attacks on Culp's Hill. For his actions Walker was given the nickname "Stonewall Jim" by his troops. He was badly wounded at the Battle of Spotsylvania Court House in 1864 and sent home to recuperate. After the death of Brig. Gen. John Pegram during the Petersburg Campaign, Walker was assigned command of the division. He led it until the surrender at Appomattox.

== Postwar career ==
When the war ended in 1865, Walker returned to his law practice and political career, being elected as a Democrat to the House of Delegates of Virginia in 1871 and 1872. VMI granted him an honorary degree in 1872 in recognition of his Civil War service. Five years later, he was elected the 13th Lieutenant Governor of Virginia, serving from 1878 to 1882 under Governor Frederick W.M. Holliday.

In 1890, Walker was a charter member of The Virginia Bar Association. In 1893, Walker switched allegiances and joined the Republican Party. He was elected to the Fifty-fourth and Fifty-fifth Congresses, serving from 1895 until 1899. During his second term, Walker served as chairman of the Committee on Elections.

In 1898, Walker was defeated for re-election by William F. Rhea. In the subsequent contest of that election, a shootout occurred at a deposition, and Walker was wounded. In 1900, Walker ran again against Rhea and lost. Walker's contest of the 1900 election was abated by his death in 1901.

== Death and legacy ==
Walker died in Wytheville, Virginia on October 21, 1901; and was buried in the town's East End Cemetery. He was the great-grandfather of M. Caldwell Butler.

Walker was the first of two Virginia Military Institute graduates to serve as Lieutenant Governor of Virginia; the second is Ralph Northam, Class of 1981, who went on to serve as the 73rd Governor of Virginia from 2018 to 2022.

== See also ==
- List of American politicians who switched parties in office
- List of American Civil War generals (Confederate)

Military offices
Preceded by Elisha F. Paxton	Commander of the Stonewall Brigade; May 14, 1863 – May 12, 1864	Succeeded by William Terry
Political offices
Preceded by Henry W. Thomas	Lieutenant Governor of Virginia; 1878–1882	Succeeded by John F. Lewis
U.S. House of Representatives
Preceded by James W. Marshall	Member of the U.S. House of Representatives from Virginia's 9th congressional district March 4, 1895 – March 3, 1899	Succeeded by William F. Rhea
