= Andrew J. Grigsby =

Confederate States Army officer

- Born: November 2, 1819; Rockbridge County, Virginia, US
- Died: December 23, 1895 (aged 76)
- Military career
- Branch: Confederate States Army
- Unit: Stonewall Brigade
- Conflicts: Maryland Campaign

Andrew Jackson Grigsby (November 2, 1819 – December 23, 1895) was a Confederate States Army officer in the famed Stonewall Brigade during the American Civil War. Grigsby was also known as both "A. J. Grigsby" and "Arnold J. Grigsby".

== Biography ==
Grigsby was born in Rockbridge County, Virginia. He attended Washington College (later, Washington & Lee University). He became a farmer and served in the Mexican War. When the Civil War erupted, he became a major in the 27th Virginia Infantry in the Stonewall Brigade in 1861 and lieutenant colonel later that year. After the regiment's commander, Col. John Echols, was wounded at Kernstown on March 23, 1862, Grigsby got command and led the regiment throughout the remainder of the Valley Campaign, the Seven Days Battles, and the Northern Virginia Campaign. When Col. William Baylor, the acting commander of the Stonewall Brigade, was killed at Second Bull Run, Grigsby took over the brigade.

Grigsby then led the Stonewall Brigade into the Maryland Campaign. At Antietam, Grigsby, despite being merely a colonel, succeeded to division command when Brig. Gen John R. Jones was wounded and Brig. Gen William E. Starke was killed. After the battle was over, Stonewall Jackson named two staff officers to fill the vacated command positions. Brig. Gen Raleigh Colston got division command and Brig. Gen Elisha Paxton got command of the Stonewall Brigade. Grigsby, who had led the brigade in two major battles, felt that he fully earned a promotion to brigadier general and was outraged at Jackson demoting him back to regimental command. One theory why Grigsby was passed over for promotion was his use of profane language, which displeased the devout and sober Jackson. Grigsby resigned his commission in disgust that November. Jackson did not explain why he was not promoted, but it has been suggested that he disliked the hot-tempered, profane Grigsby and preferred instead to appoint Elisha Paxton, a somber, religious man who was close to him.

Grigsby is reported to have had a testy encounter with Jefferson Davis, when he went to Richmond, Virginia, to protest being passed over for promotion. This resulted in his remaining at home, unemployed in further service, for the rest of the war. After his resignation on November 14, 1862, he served in the CSA House of Representatives for the Kentucky delegation. He died in Stony Point, Virginia, and is buried there in the Gross family cemetery.
