= 38th Virginia Infantry Regiment =

- Flag of Virginia, 1861
- Active: June 1861 – April 1865
- Disbanded: April 1865
- Country: Confederacy
- Allegiance: Confederate States of America
- Branch: Confederate States Army
- Type: Infantry
- Engagements: Peninsula Campaign; Seven Days' Battles; Second Battle of Bull Run; Battle of Antietam; Battle of Fredericksburg; Battle of Chancellorsville; Battle of Gettysburg; Battle of Cold Harbor; Siege of Petersburg; Appomattox Campaign; Battle of Five Forks

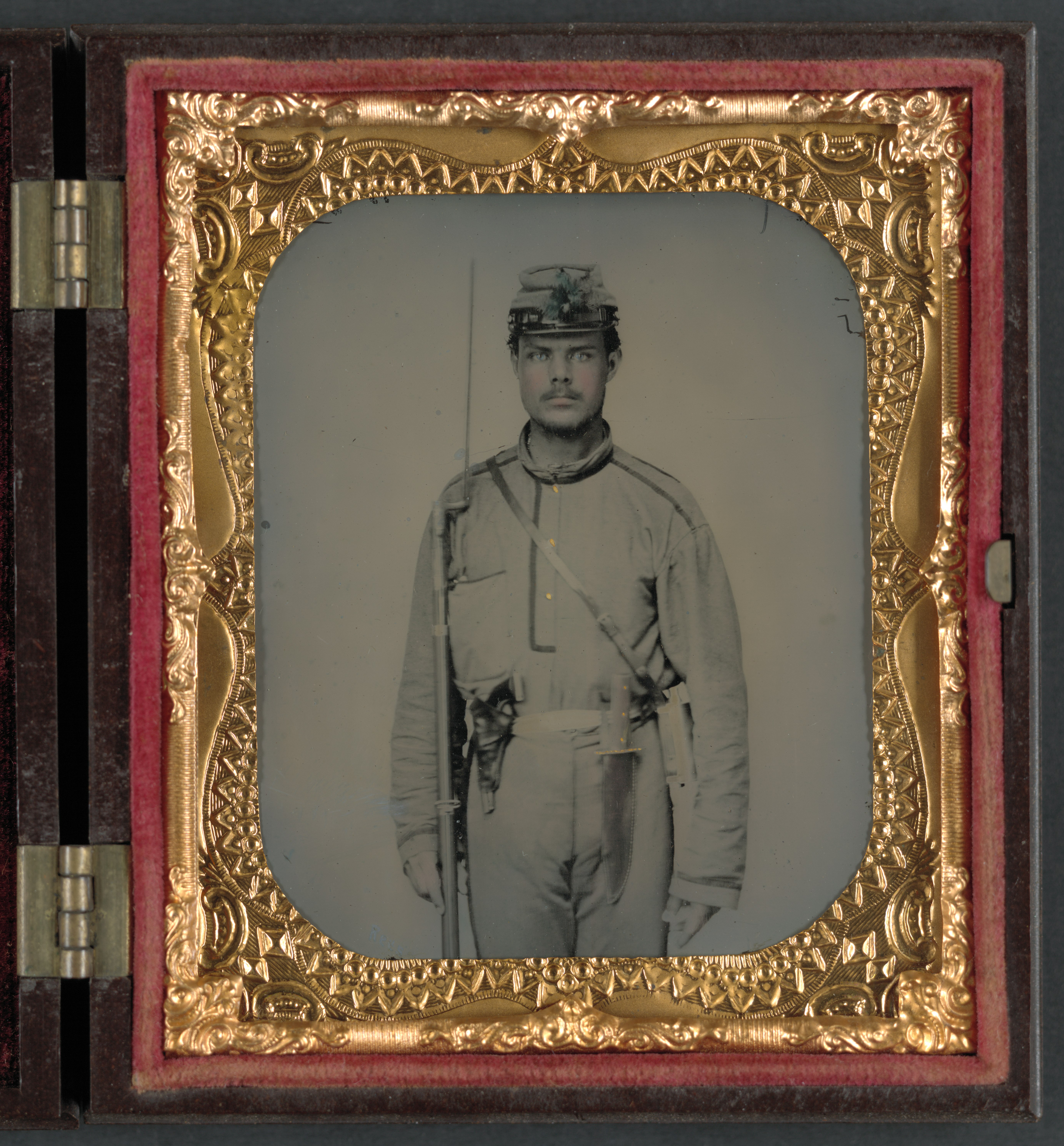
James W. Millner of Company K, 38th Virginia Infantry Regiment

The 38th Virginia Infantry Regiment was an infantry regiment raised in Virginia for service in the Confederate States Army during the American Civil War.

== History ==
The 38th Virginia was organized in Pittsylvania County, Virginia in June 1861. Its members were recruited in Pittsylvania, Halifax, and Mecklenburg counties. It served under the command of Generals Early, Garland, Armistead, Barton, and Stuart. Among the founders of the regiment was Lt. Col. (later Colonel) Powhatan Bolling Whittle of Mecklenburg County, who was later wounded at the Battle of Williamsburg.

The 38th participated in the campaigns of the Army of Northern Virginia from Williamsburg to Gettysburg, then served in North Carolina. Later it was attached to the Department of Richmond, fought at Drewry's Bluff and Cold Harbor, served in the defense of Petersburg, and ended the war at Appomattox.

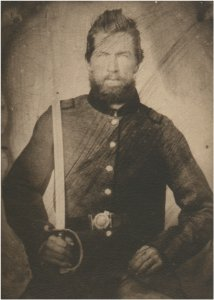
Col. Powhatan Whittle, 38th Virginia Infantry

The regiment totaled 544 effectives in April 1862, and sustained 9 casualties at Williamsburg, 147 at Seven Pines, 94 at Malvern Hill, and 16 in the Maryland Campaign. More than fifty-five percent of the 400 engaged at Gettysburg were disabled and it reported 11 killed, 30 wounded, and 10 missing at Drewry's Bluff. The unit surrendered 12 officers and 82 men.

Its commanders were Colonels Joseph R. Cabell, Edward Claxton Edmonds, George K. Griggs, and Powhatan Whittle; Lieutenant Colonel George A. Martin; and Majors Isaac H. Carrington and Henderson L. Lee.

== See also ==
- List of Virginia units in the American Civil War
