= 13th Virginia Infantry Regiment =

- Flag of Virginia, 1861
- Active: Summer 1861 – Spring 1865
- Disbanded: April 1865
- Country: Confederacy
- Allegiance: Confederate States of America
- Branch: Confederate States Army
- Type: Infantry
- Engagements: American Civil War: First Battle of Bull Run; Battle of Cross Keys; Battle of Port Republic; Seven Days' Battles; Battle of Cedar Mountain; Second Battle of Bull Run; Battle of Antietam; Battle of Fredericksburg; Battle of Chancellorsville; Battle of Cold Harbor; Siege of Petersburg; Valley Campaigns of 1864

Commanders
- Notable commanders: Colonel A.P. Hill; Colonel James A. Walker

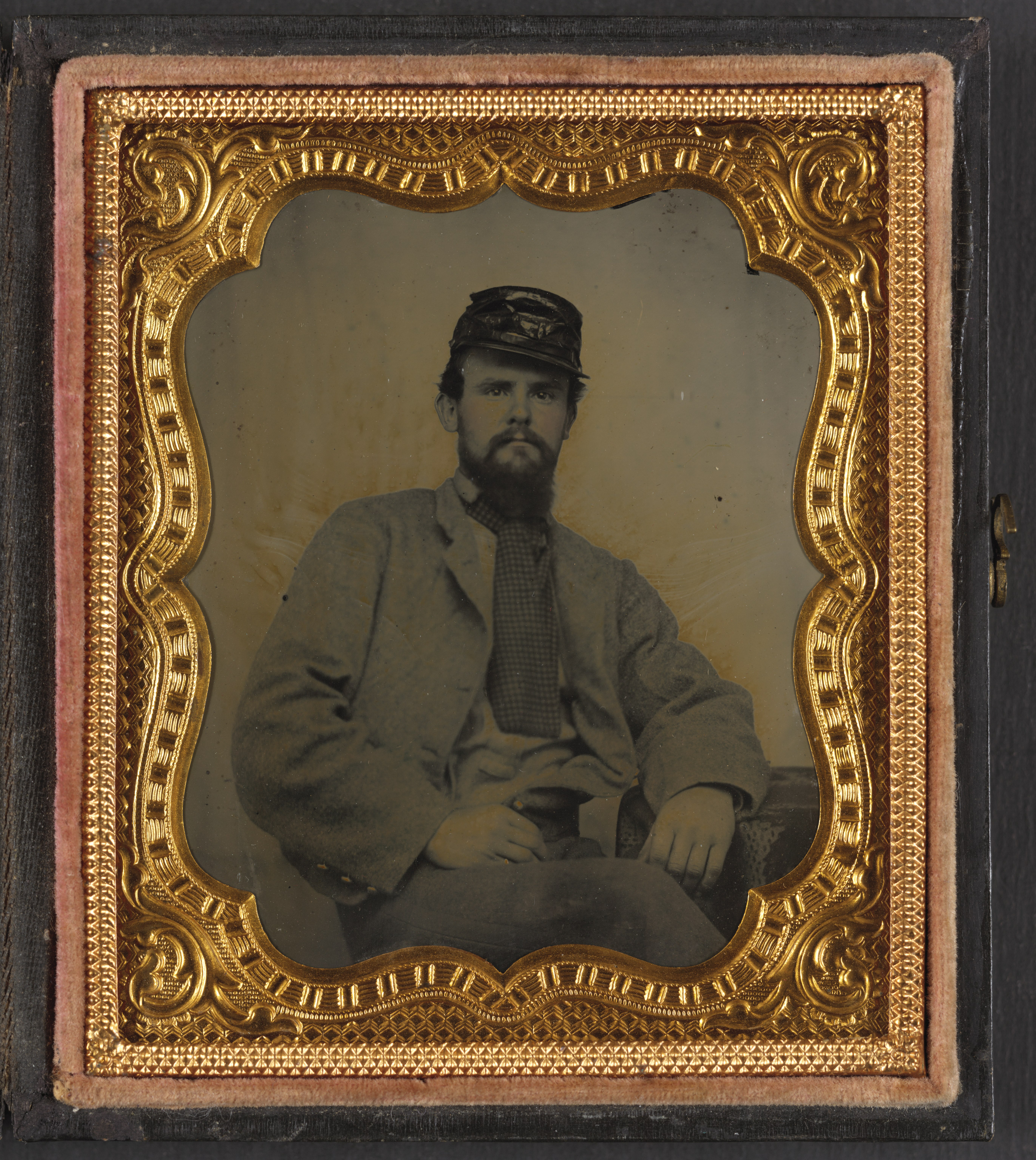
Private Richard F. Bernard of Co. A, 13th Virginia Infantry Regiment

The 13th Virginia Infantry Regiment was an infantry regiment raised in central and western Virginia for service in the Confederate States Army during the American Civil War. It fought mostly with the Army of Northern Virginia.

Its commanders were Colonels George A. Goodman, Ambrose P. Hill, James B. Terrill, and James A. Walker; and Majors Charles T. Crittenden and John B. Sherrard.

Sortable table
Company	Nickname	Recruited at	Commanding Officers
A	Montpelier Guard	Orange County	Champ G. Cooke, George Cullen, Benjamin F. Naile Weisiger
B	Culpeper Minute Men	Culpeper County	Charles T. Crittenden, Williamson G. George, Waller T. Patton, Zephaniah T. Ross
C	Gordonsville Grays	Orange County	George A. Goodman, Charles H. Richards, William C. Scott
D	Louisa Blues	Louisa County	John W. Hibbs, Henry W. Murray, Frank V. Winston
E	Culpeper Riflemen; Brandy Rifles	Culpeper County	Stockton Heth, William A. Ashby, John L. Brooks, Daniel Field
F	Barboursville Guards	Orange County	Andrew J. Eheart, Charles L. Graves, Conway Newman, William S. Parran
G	Lanier Guard	Maryland	Frank T. Hill, Alexander G. Taliaferro
H	Fort Loudoun Guards; Winchester Boomerangs	Winchester; Frederick County	Samuel D. Buck, William H. Harrison, Lewis N. Huck, William H. Sherer
I	Frontier Rifles; Hampshire Guard	Hampshire County	Job N. Cookus, Abraham Smith, Robert White, Felix Heiskell, John B. Sherrard

The 13th Virginia completed its organization during the summer of 1861 with men from Winchester and Culpeper, Orange, Louisa, and Hampshire counties, and one company from Maryland. The original Companies B and E enlisted only for 6 months, the others for one year. At the end of that year, their service was extended for the duration of the war.

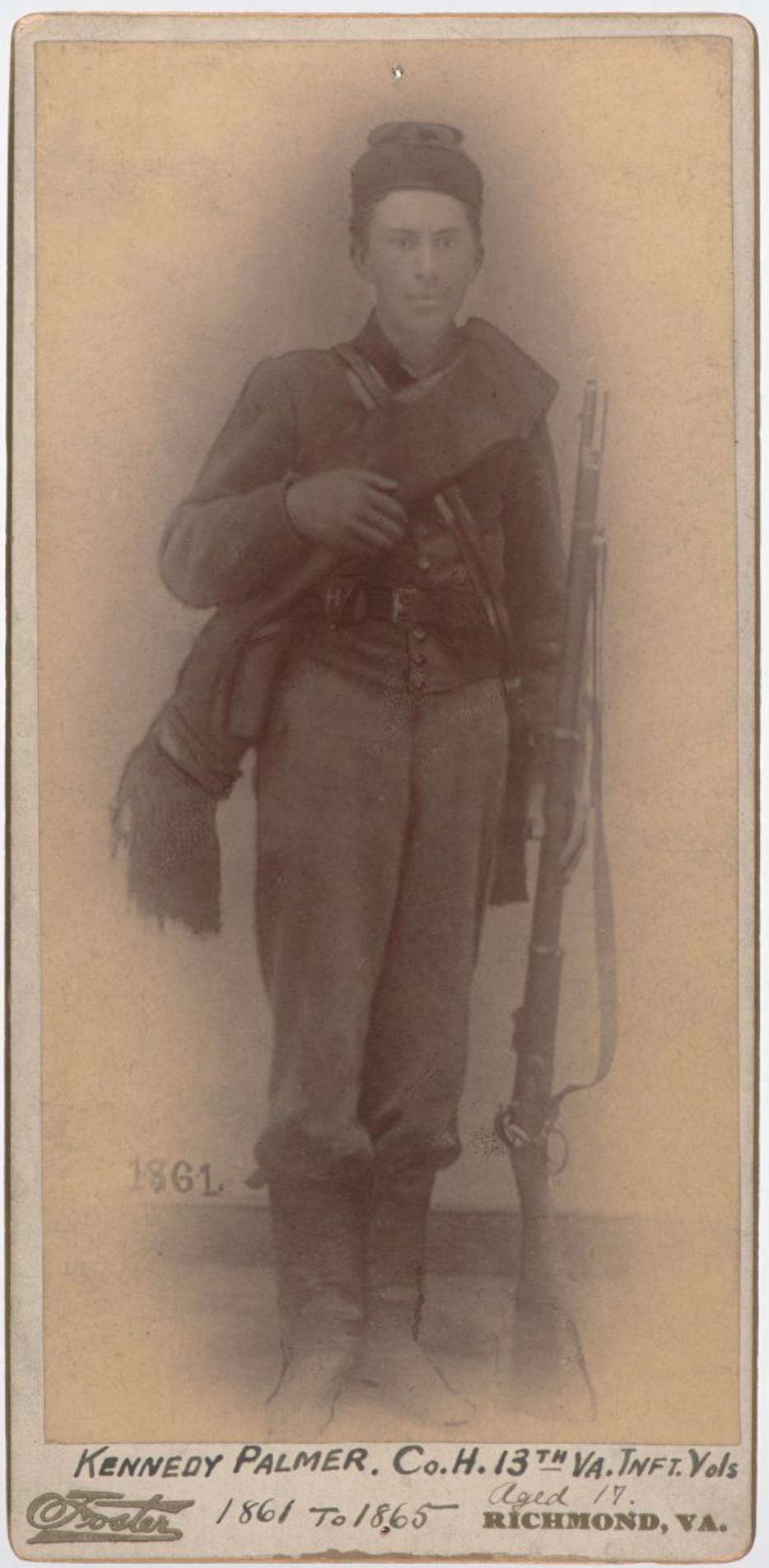
Kennedy Palmer, Co. H. 13th Va. Inft., 1861

After fighting at First Manassas and in Jackson's Valley Campaign, it served in General Early's, W.Smith's, Pegram's, and J.A. Walker's Brigade. The 13th was prominent in the campaigns of the Army of Northern Virginia from the Seven Days' Battles to Cold Harbor, then it moved with Gen. Jubal Early to the Shenandoah Valley and later was involved in the Appomattox operations.

It reported 16 casualties at Cross Keys and Port Republic, 111 at Gaines Mill, 34 at Cedar Mountain, 46 at Second Manassas, 22 at Fredericksburg, and 36 at Chancellorsville. During the Gettysburg campaign it was left at Winchester as provost guard. The unit sustained heavy losses at the Battle of Cedar Creek and surrendered at Appomattox Court House with 10 officers and 52 men.

== See also ==
- List of Virginia Civil War units
- List of West Virginia Civil War Confederate units
