= 4th Virginia Infantry Regiment =

Confederate States Army infantry regiment

- Flag of Virginia, 1861
- Active: 1861–1865
- Disbanded: April 12, 1865
- Country: Confederate States
- Allegiance: Virginia
- Branch: Army
- Type: Infantry
- Size: Regiment
- Part of: Stonewall Brigade
- Facings: Light blue
- Battles: American Civil War; First Battle of Bull Run; First Battle of Kernstown; Battle of Cedar Run; Battle of Malvern Hill; Second Battle of Bull Run; Battle of Antietam; Battle of Fredericksburg; Battle of Chancellorsville; Battle of Gettysburg; Battle of the Wilderness; Battle of Spotsylvania Court House; Battle of Cold Harbor; Siege of Petersburg; Battle of Monocacy; Battle of Appomattox Court House

Commanders
- Notable commanders: Colonel Willam Terry

The 4th Virginia Infantry Regiment was an infantry regiment raised in southwestern Virginia for service in the Confederate States Army during the American Civil War. It fought in the Stonewall Brigade, mostly with the Army of Northern Virginia. Though it suffered heavy losses, two surviving officers resumed political careers after the conflict and won election to the U.S. House of Representatives, and several more served in the Virginia General Assembly.

== History ==
The regiment was organized on April 26, 1861, at Winchester, Virginia. James F. Preston was its colonel, joined by Lewis T. Moore as Lt.Col., Major Josiah Kent, Surgeon Joseph Crockett, Asst. Surgeon Lafayette H. Jordan, and Quartermaster Andrew E. Gibson. Its companies were from the counties of Wythe, Montgomery, Pulaski, Smyth, Grayson, and Rockbridge. By the end of the month, after the First Battle of Manassas its Company K (the "Rockbridge Rifles") transferred to the 5th Virginia Infantry and were replaced by another company raised in Montgomery County but without a distinctive name. On July 15, 1861, it joined the 2nd Virginia, 5th Virginia, 27th Virginia, 33rd Virginia and a four-gun battery known as the Rockbridge Artillery to become the First Brigade of Virginia (nicknamed the "Stonewall Brigade" following the First Battle of Manassas). As discussed below, its commanders were by Generals Stonewall Jackson, and later R.B. Garnett, Winder, Paxton, and finally James A. Walker, and William Terry (both of whom began as company captains in this unit).

The regiment fought at First Manassas, having arrived by train on Saturday, July 20. Their stout defense of Henry House Hill during that engagement led South Carolina General Barnard Bee to characterize their commander General Jackson as a stone wall, hence the brigade name. Jackson reportedly ordered the 4th Virginia, "...give them the bayonet! And when you charge, yell like furies!" That mid-afternoon charge possibly became the first use of the Rebel Yell. However, a bullet in the knee ended Lt. Col. Moore's military service; Col. Preston also fell wounded. The regiment's 31 dead and 100 wounded were the highest losses in the brigade, even if one thrice-wounded sergeant whose disability ended his military career would later become Attorney General of Virginia William A. Anderson. The 4th's men recovered and drilled for next months, and Jackson was promoted to Major General, with James Preston becoming the interim commander, although his wound's lingering effects and rheumatism led to his replacement by Gen. Richard B. Garnett on December 7, 1861 (and Preston would die at his home on January 20, 1862). That winter General Jackson tried to sever the Union supply lines, especially the Baltimore and Ohio Railroad and Chesapeake and Ohio Canal. He also promoted Mexican war veteran, lawyer and politician Charles A. Ronald to command the 4th Virginia. Ronald would lead the regiment for 18 months, until disabled by war wounds.

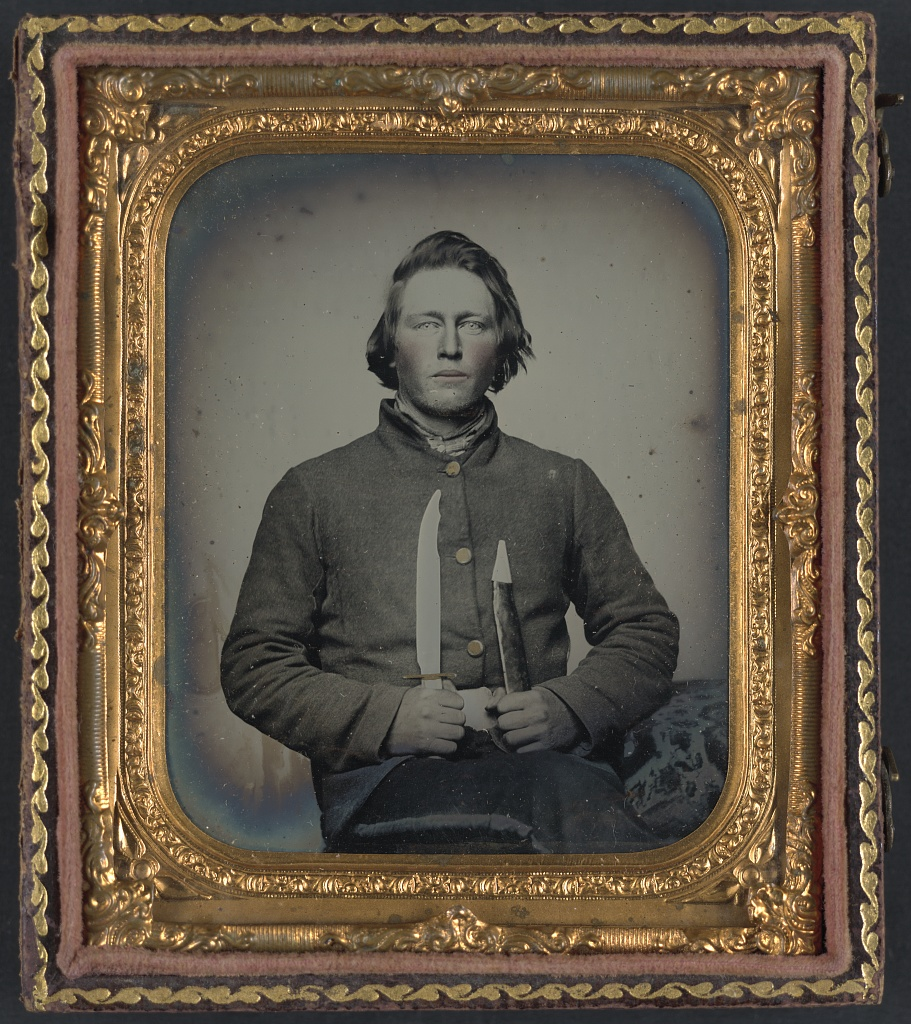
Portrait of Samuel H. Wilhelm, Company I, with knife, c. 1862.

By March 1862, the unit was only about a third of its normal strength due to sickness and resignations, but fought in the First Kernstown until its ammunition ran out, with 5 killed and 23 wounded. That battle led to Garnett's removal and replacement by Brig. Gen. Charles S. Winder. Since many volunteers' terms were expiring (and many deserted), the men were allowed to choose their officers, and chose Charles A. Ronald as their Colonel, Robert D. Gardner as Lt. Col., and William Terry as Major.

That spring, the unit participated in Jackson's Valley Campaign, marching 646 miles in 28 days and fighting 4 battles and six skirmishes. The 4th Virginia was only peripherally involved during the first battle at Front Royal and the First Battle of Winchester. However, the Stonewall Brigade delivered the primary assault at Port Republic, and this unit lost only four men wounded. As part of the Army of Northern Virginia during the Seven Days' Battles, it only participated in the Battle of Gaines' Mill (during which its surgeon was killed but alert pickets would capture Federal General John F. Reynolds and one of his aides), and the Battle of Malvern Hill on July 1, 1862, when it had 7 killed and 25 wounded. That campaign resulted in the loss of 8 killed and 48 wounded. Malaria, heat and skimpy rations took a higher toll before the Battle of Cedar Mountain engagement of August 8, 1862, where the unpopular General Winder was mortally wounded (as were 3 men of this unit and another 6 wounded). Col. Ronald was promoted to brigade command and Lt. Col. Gardner to lead the 4th Virginia.

At the three-day Battle of Second Manassas, its ranks were reduced to fewer than 100 men, with 19 killed (including officers Col. William S.H. Baylor before his promotion to brigadier general could be approved, and Captains Hugh White and Andrew Gibson, and Lts. Andrew Cummins and William C. Slusser). Of the 180 effectives, 78 were wounded, including Major Terry, but the unit was in high spirits from that Confederate victory when it crossed the Potomac River on September 6 to rendezvous with Gen. Lee at Sharpsburg. At the Battle of Antietam, the Stonewall Brigade took 250 men into action and lost 11 killed (3 from the 4th Virginia) and 77 wounded (3 from the 4th Virginia). It lost another 3 killed and 14 wounded in a skirmish at Kearneysville, at which Col. Ronald suffered a thigh wound which ended his military career. Major William Terry then became the regiment's senior officer. The 4th Virginia was suffering from a smallpox epidemic by December and so was in reserve during the Battle of Fredericksburg until the Federals breached Jackson's line, so they were called forth. While the unit acquitted itself well, twelve men were wounded, including Lt. Col. Gardiner, whose jaw wound ended his military career.

On May 2–3, 1863, the Stonewall Brigade lost forty-eight percent (160 men) of the 355 engaged at Battle of Chancellorsville, including Brig. Gen. E. Franklin Paxton, who fell dead personally leading the brigade early in the battle. The 4th Virginia's casualties were the highest of any regiment in the brigade, but the greatest loss was hearing of General Jackson's death of pneumonia following his wound by friendly fire. During the Battle of Gettysburg on July 1–2, 1863, the Brigade again covered itself in glory, particularly in the fighting on Culp's Hill, but the 4th Virginia lost (in addition to its battle flag) 18 killed, 50 wounded and 69 captured, again the heaviest losses within the brigade. Only 66 men recrossed the Potomac River. William Terry was promoted to colonel and the unit was assigned guard duty and dismantled B&O tracks on various sorties. However, it fought one last battle in 1863, and again led the Brigade in losses. Of the Brigade's 20 killed 7 were from the 4th Virginia including Capt. Jonathan Evans and Lt. Henry H. McCready, and Lt. Andrew Bourne later of battle wounds. Of the Brigade's 124 wounded, 48 came from the 4th Virginia (including Capt. Hamilton D. Wade). During the winter of 1863–1864, most of the men in the Stonewall Brigade lacked shoes and socks, and rations were down to four ounces of fatback daily, although conscripts, recruits and soldiers from other units were assigned to fill its ranks, so the 4th Virginia reached maybe 200 men. At the Battle of Spotsylvania it was trapped at the Bloody Angle and lost 7 killed, 6 wounded and 126 captured, which led the Stonewall Brigade to cease as an independent unit. Now-General William Terry commanded a heterogenous brigade that never actually reached the size of a full regiment. The regimental chaplain, William McNeer resigned. Terry's brigade was sent to join the Second Corps under Gen. Early in the Shenandoah Valley, and even threatened Washington D.C., but were hopelessly outnumbered as they retreated, and lost the Third Battle of Winchester, with the 4th Virginia suffering 3 wounded and 8 captured, another two men at the Battle of Fisher's Hill, and another man killed, 5 wounded and 4 captured at the Battle of Cedar Creek. Terry's Brigade was assigned to join Robert E. Lee's besieged army at Petersburg and also saw action around Appomattox in the war's final days as Lee frantically sought to resupply his army.

A total of 1,487 men served in the regiment, and the only staff officer at the surrender at Appomattox was assistant Surgeon John A. Field. Captain Wade had recovered and was the senior field officer at the time, with five lieutenants and 38 men (of whom only 17 were armed). John P. Moore of the Liberty Hall Volunteers became the unit's last battle fatality, during the final attempt to break out from the encircling Federal forces on Palm Sunday, April 9, 1865, shortly before General Lee decided to surrender. Its field officers were Colonels James F. Preston, Charles A. Ronald, and William Terry; Lieutenant Colonels Robert D. Gardner and Lewis T. Moore; and Majors Matthew D. Bennett, Joseph F. Kent, and Albert G. Pendleton.

When Jackson set up his headquarters in Winchester in June 1861, the commander of the 31st Virginia militia (which would become the 4th Virginia), Lieutenant Colonel Lewis Tilghman Moore invited him to use his house. His great-granddaughter, the actress Mary Tyler Moore contributed significantly to its restoration as the Stonewall Jackson's Headquarters Museum

== Regimental order of battle ==
Sortable table
Company	Nickname	Recruited at	First Commanding Officer
A	Wythe Grays	Wythe	William Terry
B	Fort Lewis Volunteers	Montgomery	David Edmundson
C	Pulaski Guards	Pulaski	James A. Walker
D	Smythe Blues	Smyth	Albert G. Pendleton
E	Montgomery Highlanders	Montgomery	Charles A. Ronald
F	Grayson Dare Devils	Grayson	Peyton N. Hale
G	Montgomery Fencibles	Montgomery	Robert T. Terry
H	Rockbridge Grays	Rockbridge	James G. Updike
I	Liberty Hall Volunteers	Rockbridge	James J. White
K	Rockbridge Rifles	Rockbridge	George W. Chambers
L	Company L	Blacksburg, Montgomery	Robert G. Newlee

== See also ==
- List of Virginia Civil War units
