= Wise Artillery =

Confederate States army unit

- Flag of Virginia
- Active: 19 April 1861 – 4 October 1862
- Country: Confederate States of America
- Branch: Confederate States Army
- Type: Artillery
- Size: Battery of four field guns
- Nicknames: Henry A. Wise Artillery, Alburtis' Battery, Brown's Battery
- Engagements: American Civil War: First Battle of Manassas; Peninsula Campaign; Seven Days Battles; Battle of Gaines's Mill; Second Battle of Manassas; Battle of Harpers Ferry; Battle of Antietam

Commanders
- Notable commanders: Ephraim G. Alburtis; James S. Brown

The Wise Artillery was an artillery unit with the Confederate States Army during the American Civil War.

This unit was distinct from the Wise Legion Artillery which was a battalion formed in the Kanawha Valley in 1861 as part of Brig. Gen. Henry A. Wise's brigade.

Cpt. Ephraim G. Alburtis organized the company in Berkeley County, Virginia, in 1859 in response to John Brown's raid on Harper's Ferry. It was named after then-governor of Virginia, Henry A. Wise. A group of men from this company are seen in a drawing of John Brown's execution as drawn by David Hunter Strother.

The battery was mustered into Confederate service on April 19, 1861 when it was entered as "Co. B" of the 1st Virginia Light Artillery Regiment. It became an independent battery in April of 1862. Many of the men enlisted from Berkeley County, but the battery also included many men from Jefferson, Orange and Frederick counties. It was armed with two 12-pound smoothbore cannon and two 6-pound smoothbore cannon.

Lt. John Pelham was the drillmaster and artillery instructor for the unit, which he joined in June 1861. Their first engagement came at the First Battle of Manassas, where they supported Stonewall Jackson's brigade.

Col. Alburtis resigned in January 1862 due to ill health. 1st Lt. James Brown was elected captain and the battery became known under his name from January to October 1862. As such, they fought in the Seven Days Battles, the Peninsula campaign, Second Battle of Manassas and Antietam, where they repulsed a Union attack at Burnside Bridge.

Wise Special Order #209 effectively ended the unit on Oct. 4, 1862. Capt. Brown had been severely injured at Antietam, and its effective strength was reduced to 48 men, half the strength they had been just four months previous to the Battle of Gaines Mill. Most of the men were reassigned to Eubank's/Taylor's Virginia Battalion or other units of Col. Stephen D. Lee's Battalion of Artillery.
