= 27th Virginia Infantry Regiment =

- Flag of Virginia, 1861
- Active: May 1861 – April 1865
- Disbanded: April 1865
- Country: Confederate States of America
- Allegiance: Virginia
- Branch: Confederate States Army
- Type: Infantry
- Nickname(s): The Bloody 27th
- Engagements: American Civil War: First Battle of Manassas-Jackson's Valley Campaign-Seven Days' Battles-Battle of Cedar Mountain-Second Battle of Bull Run-Battle of Antietam-Battle of Fredericksburg-Battle of Chancellorsville-Battle of Gettysburg-Battle of Cold Harbor-Valley Campaigns of 1864-Appomattox Campaign

Commanders
- Notable commanders: Colonel John Echols; Colonel Andrew J. Grigsby; Major Elisha F. Paxton

The 27th Virginia Infantry Regiment was an infantry regiment raised in Virginia for service in the Confederate States Army during the American Civil War. It fought mostly with the Stonewall Brigade of the Army of Northern Virginia.

The 27th Virginia was organized in May, 1861, and accepted into Confederate service in July. The men were from the counties of Alleghany, Rockbridge, Monroe, Greenbrier, and Ohio. It contained only eight companies and became part of the famous Stonewall Brigade. During the war it served under the command of General T.J. Jackson, R.B. Garnett, Charles Sidney Winder, Paxton, J.A. Walker, and W. Terry.

The 27th fought at First Manassas, where it earned the nickname “the Bloody 27th” because of its losses, First Kernstown, and in Jackson's Valley Campaign. It then participated in the campaign of the Army of Northern Virginia from the Seven Days' Battles to Cold Harbor, moved with Early to the Shenandoah Valley, and was active around Appomattox.

The regiment reported 141 casualties at First Manassas, 57 at First Kernstown, and 4 of the 136 engaged at First Winchester. It lost 3 killed at Cedar Mountain, had 4 killed and 23 wounded at Second Manassas, and sustained 9 killed and 62 wounded at Chancellorsville. Of the 148 in action at Gettysburg about thirty percent were disabled. Only 1 officer and 20 men surrendered.

The field officers were Colonels John Echols, James K. Edmondson, William A. Gordon, and Andrew J. Grigsby; Lieutenant Colonels Charles L. Haynes and Daniel M. Shriver; and Majors Philip F. Frazer and Elisha F. Paxton.

== See also ==
- List of Virginia Civil War units
- List of West Virginia Civil War Confederate units
