= 10th Virginia Infantry Regiment =

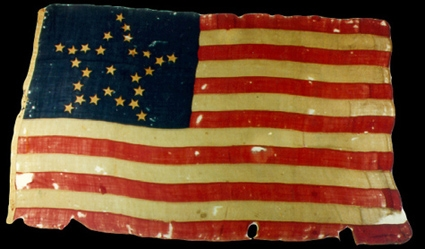
- The 10th Virginia Infantry Regiment flag carried into the first battle of Manassas, July 20–21, 1861
- Active: May 1861 – Spring 1865
- Disbanded: Spring 1865
- Country: Confederate States of America
- Allegiance: Virginia
- Branch: Confederate States Army
- Type: Infantry
- Size: Regiment
- Engagements: American Civil War: First Battle of Bull Run; Battle of McDowell; Jackson's Valley Campaign; Seven Days' Battles; Battle of Cedar Mountain; Second Battle of Bull Run; Battle of Fredericksburg; Battle of Chancellorsville; Battle of Gettysburg; Valley Campaigns of 1864

Commanders
- Colonel: Edward T.H. Warren

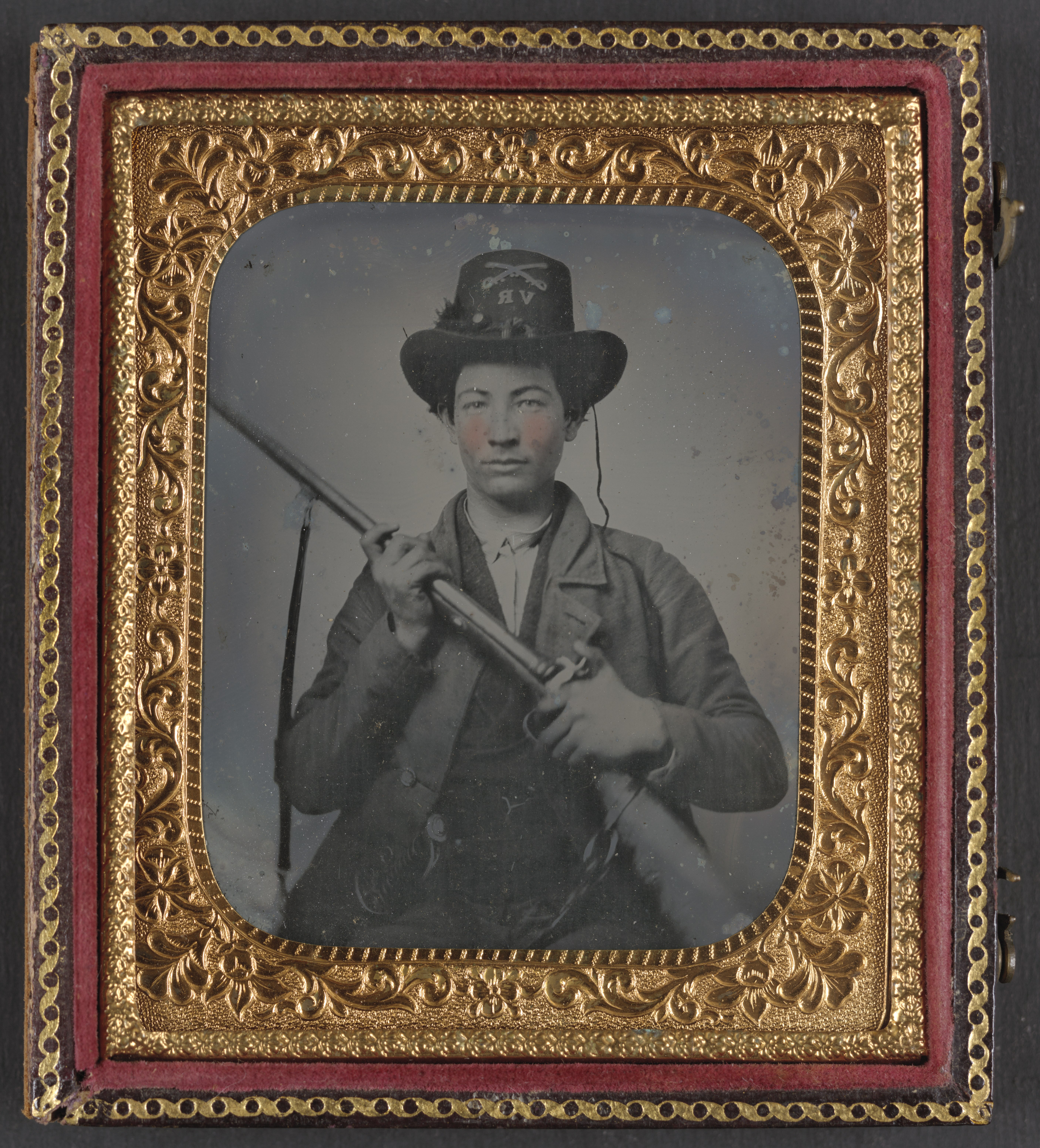
Unidentified cavalry soldier in Confederate uniform and Valley Rangers, 10th Virginia Infantry Regiment hat, with double barrel shotgun

The 10th Virginia Infantry Regiment was an infantry regiment raised in Virginia for service in the Confederate States Army during the American Civil War. It fought mostly with the Army of Northern Virginia.

The 10th Virginia was assembled at Harper's Ferry during the late spring of 1861. Four companies of the 4th Regiment Virginia Volunteers, a militia unit, were united with other volunteer companies to make up the regiment. An eleventh company was added to the command in April, 1862. Its men were raised in the counties of Shenandoah, Rockingham, Page, and Madison. During the war it was attached to Elzey's, Taliaferro's, Fulkerson's, Colston's, Steuart's, and W. Terry's Brigade.

After fighting at First Manassas and McDowell, it was active in Jackson's Valley Campaign. The 10th participated in the campaigns of the Army of Northern Virginia from the Seven Days' Battles to Cold Harbor except when it was on detached duty during the Battle of Antietam. It was involved in Early's Shenandoah Valley operations and later the Appomattox Campaign.

This unit reported 16 casualties at First Manassas, 21 at McDowell, 43 at Cedar Mountain, 32 at Second Manassas, and 157 at Chancellorsville. Of the 276 engaged at Gettysburg more than twenty-five percent were disabled. On April 9, 1865, it surrendered with 2 officers and 43 men.

The field officers were Colonels Simeon B. Gibbons and Edward T.H. Warren, Lieutenant Colonels Dorilas H.L. Martz and Samuel T. Walker, and Majors Isaac G. Coffman and Joshua Stover.

Future Speaker of the United States House of Representatives Charles Frederick Crisp was a lieutenant in Company K of the 10th Virginia. Future U.S. Senator Harrison Riddleberger also was a lieutenant in the 10th Virginia, although he transferred to the 23rd Virginia Cavalry and was promoted to captain.

== See also ==
- List of Virginia Civil War units
