= Charles Sidney Winder =

Confederate Army general (1829–1862)

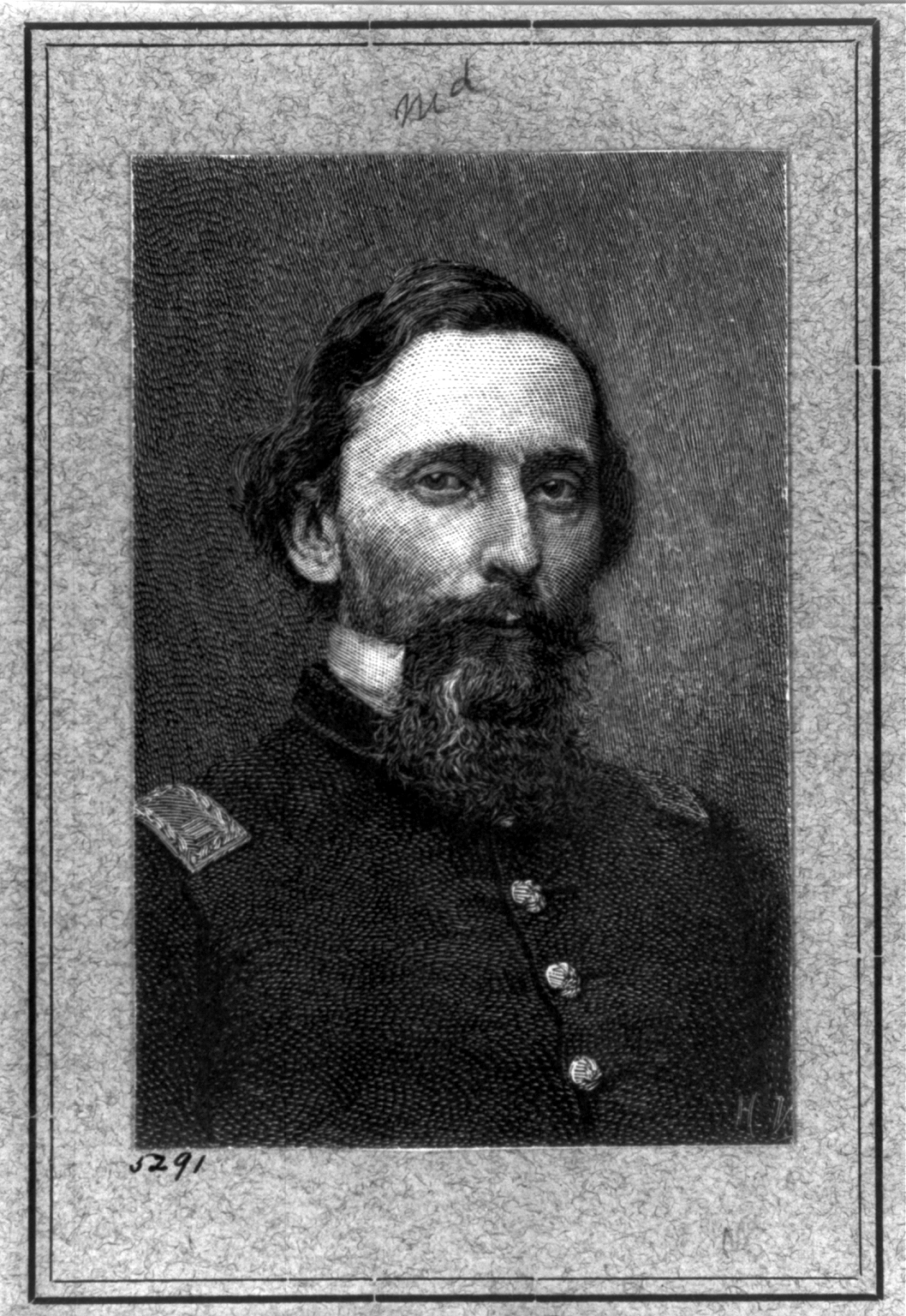
- Charles Sidney Winder photo taken between 1855 and 1861
- Born: October 18, 1829; Easton, Maryland
- Died: August 9, 1862 (aged 32); Cedar Mountain, Virginia
- Burial place: Wye House, Easton, Maryland
- Military career
- Allegiance: United States; Confederate States of America
- Branch: United States Army; Confederate States Army
- Service years: 1850–1861 (USA); 1861–1862 (CSA)
- Rank: Captain (USA); Brigadier General (CSA)
- Commands: Stonewall Brigade
- Conflicts: American Civil War: Battle of Cedar Mountain †

Charles Sidney Winder (October 18, 1829 – August 9, 1862) was a career United States Army officer and a Confederate general officer in the American Civil War. He was killed in action during the Battle of Cedar Mountain.

== Early life and career ==
Winder was born in the town of Easton in Talbot County, Maryland, a nephew of future U.S. naval officer Franklin Buchanan and a second cousin to future Confederate general John H. Winder. He attended St. John's College, also located in Maryland. Then in 1846 he entered the United States Military Academy at West Point, and graduated 22nd of 44 cadets in 1850. He was appointed a brevet second lieutenant in the 4th U.S. Artillery. Exactly a year after leaving West Point, Winder was promoted to second lieutenant in the 3rd U.S. Artillery on July 1, 1851.

Winder served as the 3rd's Regimental Adjutant from April 4, 1854 to March 3, 1855, with a promotion to first lieutenant coming on April 5, 1854. In 1854, while en route to California, the vessel on which he was aboard, the San Francisco, was struck by a hurricane. For his valor in the face of this crisis, Winder was promoted to captain in the 9th U.S. Infantry on March 3, 1855, at the relatively young age of twenty-six.

He later saw action against Native Americans in the Washington Territory. At the outbreak of hostilities between North and South, he resigned from the Army in 1861.

== Civil War service ==
Winder resigned his U.S. Army commission on April 1, 1861, and was appointed a captain of artillery in the Confederate Army on May 16, and then quickly promoted to major later that day. He was appointed colonel of the 6th South Carolina Infantry on July 8, leading it to prominence in the Confederate army.

He was promoted to brigadier general on March 1, 1862, and assigned to the Shenandoah Valley under the command of Stonewall Jackson. Having recently court-martialed Brig. Gen. Richard B. Garnett, Jackson placed Winder in command of his old brigade. This, combined with Winder's reputation as a strict disciplinarian, was widely resented by both the officers and men now under him. In fact, so general was the feeling of animosity toward him, by August 1862 it was widely rumored Winder would be shot by one of his own men in the next battle.

Winder's men acknowledged he was personally a brave man. But his disciplinary tactics were considered severe enough that he was called “tyrannical” by his men. Winder was told by commanding General, Stonewall Jackson, to end his disciplinary practice of “bucking”.

Casler, John O. Four years in the Stonewall Brigade pgs 101-10

=== Cedar Mountain and death ===
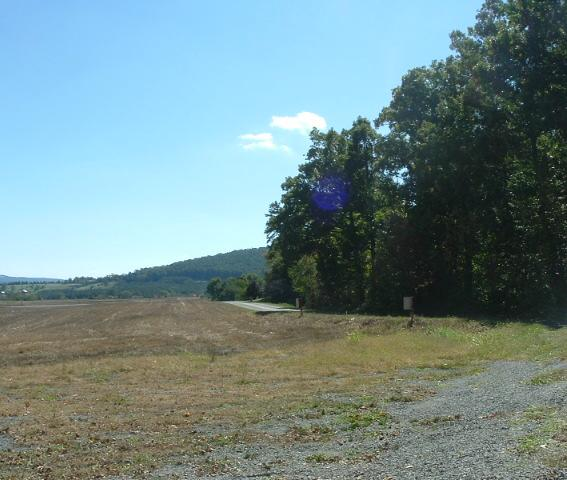
Approximate location at Cedar Mountain battlefield where Gen. Winder was standing when mortally wounded by a Union shell. Facing south.

On August 9, 1862, Winder led his men into battle at Cedar Mountain, on the left flank of the Confederate line. He did so despite having been ill for several days, and in defiance of a surgeon's order to rest. He was personally directing the fire of a battery when a Union shell struck him in his left side, horribly mangling him. Borne to the rear on a stretcher, Winder died later that evening.

Winder's body was initially buried in nearby Orange Court House, before being disinterred and transported to Richmond. There, a state funeral was given in his honor, followed by re-interment at Hollywood Cemetery. Three years later, his family had his body again removed, this time to be permanently buried in the family cemetery at Wye House, located near his birthplace of Easton, Maryland.

In his official report of the battle, Stonewall Jackson lamented General Winder's loss, writing,

It is difficult within the proper reserve of an official report to do justice to the merits of this accomplished officer. Urged by the medical director to take no part in the movements of the day because of the then enfeebled state of his health, his ardent patriotism and military pride could bear no such restraint. Richly endowed with those qualities of mind and person which fit an officer for command and which attract the admiration and excite the enthusiasm of troops, he was rapidly rising to the front rank of his profession. His loss has been severely felt.

== See also ==
- List of American Civil War generals (Confederate)
