= Battle of Antietam order of battle: Union =

US Civil War Union army units in the Battle of Antietam

The following Union Army units and commanders fought in the Battle of Antietam of the American Civil War. The Confederate order of battle is listed separately. Order of battle compiled from the army organization during the Maryland Campaign, the casualty returns and the reports.

== Abbreviations used ==
=== Military rank ===
- MG = Major General
- BG = Brigadier General
- Col = Colonel
- Ltc = Lieutenant Colonel
- Maj = Major
- Cpt = Captain
- Lt = Lieutenant

=== Other ===
- w = wounded
- mw = mortally wounded
- k = killed in action
- c = captured

== Army of the Potomac ==
MG George McClellan

=== General Staff and Headquarters ===
General Staff

- Chief of Staff: BG Randolph B. Marcy
- Assistant Adjutant General: BG Seth Williams
- Inspector General: BG Delos B. Sackett
- Chief of Artillery: BG Henry J. Hunt
- Chief Quartermaster: Ltc Rufus Ingalls

General Headquarters

Escort: Cpt James B. McIntyre

- Independent Company Oneida (New York) Cavalry: Cpt Daniel P. Mann
- 4th United States Cavalry, Company A: Lt Thomas H. McCormick
- 4th United States Cavalry, Company E: Cpt James B. McIntyre

U.S. Engineer Battalion: Cpt James C. Duane

Provost Guard: Maj William H. Wood

- 2nd United States Cavalry, Companies E, F, H, and K: Cpt George A. Gordon
- 8th United States, Companies A, D, F, and G: Cpt Royal T. Frank
- 19th United States, Company G: Cpt Edmund L. Smith
- 19th United States, Company H: Cpt Henry S. Welton

Headquarters Guard: Maj Granville O. Haller

- 93rd New York: Ltc Benjamin C. Butler

Quartermaster's Guard:

- 1st United States Cavalry, Companies B, C, H, and I: Cpt Marcus A. Reno

=== I Corps ===
MG Joseph Hooker (w)
BG George G. Meade

Escort:

- 2nd New York Cavalry, Companies A, B, I and K: Cpt John E. Naylor

Division	Brigade	Regiments and Others
First Division; BG Abner Doubleday	1st Brigade Col Walter Phelps, Jr.	22nd New York: Ltc John McKie, Jr.; 24th New York: Cpt John D. O'Brian (w); 30th New York: Col William M. Searing; 84th New York (14th Militia): Maj William H. de Bevoise (k); 2nd United States Sharpshooters: Col Henry A. V. Post (w)
First Division; BG Abner Doubleday	2nd Brigade Ltc William Hofmann	7th Indiana: Maj Ira G. Grover; 76th New York: Cpt John W. Young; 95th New York: Maj Edward Pye; 56th Pennsylvania: Cpt Frederick Williams
First Division; BG Abner Doubleday	3rd Brigade BG Marsena R. Patrick	21st New York: Col William F. Rogers; 23rd New York: Col Henry C. Hoffman; 35th New York: Col Newton B. Lord; 80th New York (20th Militia): Ltc Theodore B. Gates
First Division; BG Abner Doubleday	4th Brigade BG John Gibbon	19th Indiana: Ltc Alois O. Bachman (k), Cpt William W. Dudley; 2nd Wisconsin: Ltc Thomas S. Allen (w), Cpt George B. Ely; 6th Wisconsin: Ltc Edward S. Bragg (w), Maj Rufus R. Dawes; 7th Wisconsin: Cpt John B. Callis
First Division; BG Abner Doubleday	Artillery Cpt J. Albert Monroe	New Hampshire Light, 1st Battery: Lt Frederick M. Edgell; 1st Rhode Island Light, Battery D: Cpt J. Albert Monroe; 1st New York Light, Battery L: Cpt John A. Reynolds; 4th United States, Battery B: Cpt Joseph B. Campbell (w), Lt James Stewart
Second Division; BG James B. Ricketts (w)	1st Brigade BG Abram Duryée	97th New York: Maj Charles B. Northrup; 104th New York: Maj Lewis C. Skinner; 105th New York: Col Howard Carroll (mw), Cpt John C. Whiteside; 107th Pennsylvania: Cpt James McThomson
Second Division; BG James B. Ricketts (w)	2nd Brigade Col William H. Christian; Col Peter Lyle	26th New York: Ltc Richard H. Richardson; 94th New York: Ltc Calvin Littlefield; 88th Pennsylvania: Ltc George W. Gile (w), Cpt Henry B. Myers; 90th Pennsylvania: Col Peter Lyle (w), Ltc William A. Leech
Second Division; BG James B. Ricketts (w)	3rd Brigade BG George L. Hartsuff (w); Col Richard Coulter	12th Massachusetts: Maj Elisha Burbank (mw), Cpt Benjamin F. Cook; 13th Massachusetts: Maj J. Parker Gould; 83rd New York (9th Militia): Ltc William Atterbury; 11th Pennsylvania: Col Richard Coulter, Cpt David M. Cook
Second Division; BG James B. Ricketts (w)	Artillery	1st Pennsylvania Light, Battery F: Cpt Ezra W. Matthews; Pennsylvania Light, Battery C: Cpt James Thompson
Third Division; BG George G. Meade; BG Truman Seymour	1st Brigade BG Truman Seymour; Col Richard Biddle Roberts	1st Pennsylvania Reserves: Col Richard Biddle Roberts, Cpt William C. Talley; 2nd Pennsylvania Reserves: Cpt James N. Byrnes; 5th Pennsylvania Reserves: Col Joseph W. Fisher; 6th Pennsylvania Reserves: Col William Sinclair; 13th Pennsylvania Reserves (1st Rifles): Col Hugh McNiel (k) Cpt Dennis McGee
Third Division; BG George G. Meade; BG Truman Seymour	2nd Brigade Col Albert Magilton	3rd Pennsylvania Reserves: Ltc John Clark; 4th Pennsylvania Reserves: Maj John Nyce; 7th Pennsylvania Reserves: Maj Chauncey A. Lyman; 8th Pennsylvania Reserves: Maj Silas M. Bailey
Third Division; BG George G. Meade; BG Truman Seymour	3rd Brigade Ltc Robert Anderson	9th Pennsylvania Reserves: Cpt Samuel B. Dick; 10th Pennsylvania Reserves: Ltc Adoniram J. Warner (w), Cpt Jonathan P. Smith; 11th Pennsylvania Reserves: Ltc Samuel M. Jackson; 12th Pennsylvania Reserves: Cpt Richard Gustin
Third Division; BG George G. Meade; BG Truman Seymour	Artillery	1st Pennsylvania Light, Battery A: Lt John G. Simpson; 1st Pennsylvania Light, Battery B: Cpt James H. Cooper; 5th United States, Battery C: Cpt Dunbar R. Ransom

=== II Corps ===
MG Edwin V. Sumner

Escort:

- 6th New York Cavalry, Company D: Cpt Henry W. Lyon
- 6th New York Cavalry, Company K: Cpt Riley Johnson

Division	Brigade	Regiments and Others
First Division; MG Israel B. Richardson (mw); BG John C. Caldwell; BG Winfield S. Hancock	1st Brigade BG John C. Caldwell	5th New Hampshire: Col Edward E. Cross (w); 7th New York: Cpt Charles Brestel; 61st New York: Ltc Nelson A. Miles; 64th New York: Col Francis C. Barlow (w), 81st Pennsylvania: Maj H. Boyd McKeen
First Division; MG Israel B. Richardson (mw); BG John C. Caldwell; BG Winfield S. Hancock	2nd Brigade BG Thomas F. Meagher (w); Col John Burke	29th Massachusetts: Ltc Joseph H. Barnes; 63rd New York: Col John Burke, Ltc Henry Fowler (w), Maj Richard C. Bentley (w), Cpt Joseph O'Neill; 69th New York: Ltc James Kelly (w), Maj James Cavanagh; 88th New York: Ltc Patrick Kelly
First Division; MG Israel B. Richardson (mw); BG John C. Caldwell; BG Winfield S. Hancock	3rd Brigade Col John R. Brooke	2nd Delaware: Cpt David L. Stricker; 52nd New York: Col Paul Frank; 57th New York: Ltc Philip S. Parisen (k), Maj Alford B. Chapman; 66th New York: Cpt Julius Wehle; 53rd Pennsylvania: Ltc Richards McMichael
First Division; MG Israel B. Richardson (mw); BG John C. Caldwell; BG Winfield S. Hancock	Artillery	1st New York Light, Battery B: Cpt Rufus D. Pettit; 4th United States, Battery A and C: Lt Evan Thomas
Second Division; MG John Sedgwick (w); BG Oliver O. Howard	1st Brigade BG Willis A. Gorman	15th Massachusetts: Ltc John W. Kimball; 1st Minnesota: Col Alfred Sully; 34th New York: Col James A. Suitor; 82nd New York (2nd Militia): Col Henry W. Hudson; Massachusetts Sharpshooters, 1st Company: Cpt John Saunders (k); Minnesota Sharpshooters, 2nd Company: Cpt William F. Russell
Second Division; MG John Sedgwick (w); BG Oliver O. Howard	2nd Brigade BG Oliver O. Howard; Col Joshua T. Owen; Col DeWitt C. Baxter	69th Pennsylvania: Col Joshua T. Owen; 71st Pennsylvania: Col Isaac J. Wistar (w); 72nd Pennsylvania: Col DeWitt C. Baxter; 106th Pennsylvania: Col Turner G. Morehead
Second Division; MG John Sedgwick (w); BG Oliver O. Howard	3rd Brigade BG Napoleon J. T. Dana (w); Col Norman J. Hall	19th Massachusetts: Col Edward W. Hinks (w), Ltc Arthur F. Devereux (w), Cpt H. G. Weymouth; 20th Massachusetts: Col William R. Lee; 7th Michigan: Col Norman J. Hall, Cpt Charles J. Hunt; 42nd New York: Ltc George N. Bomford (w), Maj James E. Mallon; 59th New York: Col William L. Tidball
Second Division; MG John Sedgwick (w); BG Oliver O. Howard	Artillery	1st Rhode Island Light, Battery A: Cpt John A. Tompkins; 1st United States, Battery I: Lt George A. Woodruff
Third Division; BG William H. French	1st Brigade BG Nathan Kimball	14th Indiana: Col William Harrow; 4th Ohio: Col. John S. Mason; 8th Ohio: Ltc Franklin Sawyer; 132nd Pennsylvania: Col Richard A. Oakford (k), Ltc Vincent M. Wilcox; 7th West Virginia: Col Joseph Snider
Third Division; BG William H. French	2nd Brigade Col Dwight Morris	14th Connecticut: Ltc Sanford H. Perkins; 108th New York: Col Oliver H. Palmer; 130th Pennsylvania: Col Henry I. Zinn
Third Division; BG William H. French	3rd Brigade BG Max Weber (w); Col John W. Andrews	1st Delaware: Col John W. Andrews, Ltc Oliver Hopkinson (w); 5th Maryland: Maj Leopold Blumenberg (w), Cpt William W. Bamberger (w), Cpt Salome Marsh (w&c), Cpt Ernest F. M. Faehtz; 4th New York: Ltc John D. MacGregor
	Unattached Artillery	1st New York Light, Battery G: Cpt John D. Frank; 1st Rhode Island Light, Battery B: Cpt John G. Hazard; 1st Rhode Island Light, Battery G: Cpt Charles D. Owen

=== IV Corps ===
Division	Brigade	Regiments and Others
First Division; MG Darius N. Couch	1st Brigade BG Charles Devens	7th Massachusetts: Col David A. Russell; 10th Massachusetts: Col Henry L. Eustis; 36th New York: Col William H. Browne; 2nd Rhode Island: Col Frank Wheaton
First Division; MG Darius N. Couch	2nd Brigade BG Albion P. Howe	62nd New York: Col David J. Nevin; 93rd Pennsylvania: Col James M. McCarter; 98th Pennsylvania: Col John F. Ballier; 102nd Pennsylvania: Col Thomas A. Rowley; 139th Pennsylvania: Col Frank H. Collier
First Division; MG Darius N. Couch	3rd Brigade BG John Cochrane	65th New York: Col Alexander Shaler; 67th New York: Col Julius W. Adams; 122nd New York: Col Silas Titus; 23rd Pennsylvania: Col Thomas H. Neill; 31st Pennsylvania: Col George C. Spear; 61st Pennsylvania: Col David H. Williams
First Division; MG Darius N. Couch	Artillery	New York Light, 3rd Battery: Cpt William Stuart; 1st Pennsylvania Light, Battery C: Cpt Jeremiah McCarthy; 1st Pennsylvania Light, Battery D: Cpt Michael Hall; 2nd United States, Battery G: Lt John H. Butler

=== V Corps ===
MG Fitz John Porter

Escort:

- 1st Maine Cavalry (detachment): Cpt George J. Summat

Division	Brigade	Regiments and Others
First Division; MG George W. Morell	1st Brigade Col James Barnes	2nd Maine: Col Charles W. Roberts; 18th Massachusetts: Ltc Joseph Hayes; 22nd Massachusetts: Ltc William S. Tilton; 1st Michigan: Cpt Emory W. Belton; 13th New York: Col Elisha Marshall; 25th New York: Col Charles A. Johnson; 118th Pennsylvania: Col Charles M. Prevost; Massachusetts Sharpshooters, 2nd Company: Cpt Lewis E. Wentworth
First Division; MG George W. Morell	2nd Brigade BG Charles Griffin	2nd District of Columbia: Col Charles M. Alexander; 9th Massachusetts: Col Patrick R. Guiney; 32nd Massachusetts: Col Francis J. Parker; 4th Michigan: Col Jonathan W. Childs; 14th New York: Col James McQuade; 62nd Pennsylvania: Col Jacob B. Sweitzer
First Division; MG George W. Morell	3rd Brigade Col T.B.W. Stockton	20th Maine: Col Adelbert Ames; 16th Michigan: Ltc Norval E. Welch; 12th New York: Cpt William Huson; 17th New York: Ltc Nelson B. Bartram; 44th New York: Maj Freeman Conner; 83rd Pennsylvania: Cpt Orpheus S. Woodward; Michigan Sharpshooters, Brady's Company: Lt Jonas H. Titus Jr.
First Division; MG George W. Morell	Artillery	Massachusetts Light, Battery C: Cpt Augustus P. Martin; 1st Rhode Island Light, Battery C: Cpt Richard Waterman; 5th United States, Battery D: Lt Charles E. Hazlett
First Division; MG George W. Morell	Sharpshooters	1st United States: Cpt John B. Isler
Second Division; BG George Sykes	1st Brigade Ltc Robert C. Buchanan	3rd United States: Cpt John D. Wilkins; 4th United States: Cpt Hiram Dryer; 12th United States, 1st Battalion: Cpt Matthew M. Blunt; 12th United States, 2nd Battalion: Cpt Thomas M. Anderson; 14th United States, 1st Battalion: Cpt W. Harvey Brown; 14th United States, 2nd Battalion: Cpt David B. McKibbin
Second Division; BG George Sykes	2nd Brigade Maj Charles S. Lovell	1st and 6th United States: Cpt Levi C. Bootes; 2nd and 10th United States: Cpt John S. Poland; 11th United States: Maj DeLancey Floyd-Jones; 17th United States: Maj George L. Andrews
Second Division; BG George Sykes	3rd Brigade Col Gouverneur K. Warren	5th New York: Cpt Cleveland Winslow; 10th New York: Ltc John W. Marshall
Second Division; BG George Sykes	Artillery	1st United States, Batteries E and G: Lt Alanson M. Randol; 5th United States, Battery I: Cpt Stephen H. Weed; 5th United States, Battery K: Lt William E. Van Reed
Third Division; BG Andrew A. Humphreys	1st Brigade BG Erastus B. Tyler	91st Pennsylvania: Col Edgar M. Gregory; 126th Pennsylvania: Col James G. Elder; 129th Pennsylvania: Col Jacob G. Frick; 134th Pennsylvania: Col Matthew S. Quay
Third Division; BG Andrew A. Humphreys	2nd Brigade Col Peter H. Allabach	123rd Pennsylvania: Col John B. Clark; 131st Pennsylvania: Ltc William B. Shaut; 133rd Pennsylvania: Col Franklin B. Speakman; 155th Pennsylvania: Col Edward J. Allen
Third Division; BG Andrew A. Humphreys	Artillery	1st New York Light, Battery C: Cpt Almont Barnes; 1st Ohio Light, Battery L: Cpt Lucius N. Robinson
	Artillery Reserve Ltc William Hays	1st Battalion New York Light, Battery A: Lt Bernhard Wever; 1st Battalion New York Light, Battery B: Lt Alfred von Kleiser; 1st Battalion New York Light, Battery C: Cpt Robert Langner; 1st Battalion New York Light, Battery D: Cpt Charles Kusserow; New York Light, 5th Battery: Cpt Elijah D. Taft; 1st United States, Battery K: Cpt William M. Graham; 4th United States, Battery G: Lt Marcus P. Miller

=== VI Corps ===
MG William B. Franklin

Escort:

- 6th Pennsylvania Cavalry, Companies B and G: Cpt Henry P. Muirheid

Division	Brigade	Regiments and Others
First Division; MG Henry W. Slocum	1st Brigade Col Alfred T. A. Torbert	1st New Jersey: Ltc Mark W. Collet; 2nd New Jersey: Col Samuel L. Buck; 3rd New Jersey: Col Henry W. Brown; 4th New Jersey: Col William B. Hatch
First Division; MG Henry W. Slocum	2nd Brigade Col Joseph J. Bartlett	5th Maine: Col Nathaniel J. Jackson; 16th New York: Ltc Joel J. Seaver; 27th New York: Ltc Alexander D. Adams; 96th Pennsylvania: Col Henry L. Cake
First Division; MG Henry W. Slocum	3rd Brigade BG John Newton	18th New York: Ltc George R. Myers; 31st New York: Ltc Francis H. Pinto; 32nd New York: Col Roderick Matheson; 95th Pennsylvania: Col Gustavus W. Town
First Division; MG Henry W. Slocum	Artillery Cpt Emory Upton	Maryland Light, Battery A: Cpt John W. Wolcott; Massachusetts Light, Battery A: Cpt Josiah Porter; New Jersey Light, Battery A: Cpt William Hexamer; 2nd United States, Battery D: Lt Edward B. Williston
Second Division; MG William F. Smith	1st Brigade BG Winfield S. Hancock; Col Amasa Cobb	6th Maine: Col Hiram Burnham; 43rd New York: Maj John Wilson; 49th Pennsylvania: Ltc William Brisbane; 137th Pennsylvania: Col Henry M. Bossert; 5th Wisconsin: Col Amasa Cobb
Second Division; MG William F. Smith	2nd Brigade BG William T. H. Brooks	2nd Vermont: Maj James H. Walbridge; 3rd Vermont: Col Breed N. Hyde; 4th Vermont: Ltc Charles B. Stoughton; 5th Vermont: Col Lewis A. Grant; 6th Vermont: Maj Oscar L. Tuttle
Second Division; MG William F. Smith	3rd Brigade Col William H. Irwin	7th Maine: Maj Thomas W. Hyde; 20th New York: Col Ernst von Vegesack; 33rd New York: Ltc Joseph W. Corning; 49th New York: Ltc William C. Alberger (w), Maj George W. Johnson; 77th New York: Cpt Nathan S. Babcock
Second Division; MG William F. Smith	Artillery Cpt Romeyn B. Ayres	Maryland Light, Battery B: Lt Theodore J. Vanneman; New York Light, 1st Battery: Cpt Andrew Cowan; 5th United States, Battery F: Lt Leonard Martin

=== IX Corps ===
MG Ambrose Burnside
BG Jacob D. Cox

Escort:

- 1st Maine Cavalry, Company G: Cpt Zebulon B. Blethen

Division	Brigade	Regiments and Others
First Division; BG Orlando B. Willcox	1st Brigade Col Benjamin C. Christ	28th Massachusetts: Cpt Andrew P. Caraher; 17th Michigan: Col William H. Withington; 79th New York: Ltc David Morrison; 50th Pennsylvania: Maj Edward Overton, Jr. (w), Cpt William H. Diehl
First Division; BG Orlando B. Willcox	2nd Brigade Col Thomas Welsh	8th Michigan: Ltc Frank Graves, Maj Ralph Ely; 46th New York: Ltc Joseph P. Gerhardt; 45th Pennsylvania: Ltc John I. Curtin; 100th Pennsylvania: Ltc David A. Leckey
First Division; BG Orlando B. Willcox	Artillery	Massachusetts Light, 8th Battery: Cpt Asa M. Cook; 2nd U.S. Artillery, Battery E: Lt Samuel N. Benjamin
Second Division; BG Samuel D. Sturgis	1st Brigade BG James Nagle	2nd Maryland: Ltc J. Eugene Duryée; 6th New Hampshire: Col Simon G. Griffin; 9th New Hampshire: Col Enoch Q. Fellows; 48th Pennsylvania: Ltc Joshua K. Sigfried
Second Division; BG Samuel D. Sturgis	2nd Brigade BG Edward Ferrero	21st Massachusetts: Col William S. Clark; 35th Massachusetts: Ltc Sumner Carruth (w); 51st New York: Col Robert B. Potter; 51st Pennsylvania: Col John F. Hartranft
Second Division; BG Samuel D. Sturgis	Artillery	Pennsylvania Light, Battery D: Cpt George W. Durell; 4th U.S. Artillery, Battery E: Cpt Joseph C. Clark, Jr. (w)
Third Division; BG Isaac P. Rodman (mw); Col Edward Harland; MG John G. Parke	1st Brigade Col Harrison S. Fairchild	9th New York: Ltc Edgar A. Kimball; 89th New York: Maj Edward Jardine; 103rd New York: Maj Benjamin Ringold
Third Division; BG Isaac P. Rodman (mw); Col Edward Harland; MG John G. Parke	2nd Brigade Col Edward Harland	8th Connecticut: Ltc Hiram Appelman (w), Maj John H. Ward; 11th Connecticut: Col Henry W. Kingsbury (mw); 16th Connecticut: Col Francis Beach; 4th Rhode Island: Col William H. P. Steere (w), Ltc Joseph B. Curtis
Third Division; BG Isaac P. Rodman (mw); Col Edward Harland; MG John G. Parke	Artillery	5th United States, Battery A: Lt Charles P. Muhlenberg
Kanawha Division; Col Eliakim P. Scammon	1st Brigade Col Hugh B. Ewing	12th Ohio: Col Carr B. White; 23rd Ohio: Maj James M. Comly; 30th Ohio: Ltc Theodore Jones (w&c), Maj George H. Hildt; Ohio Light Artillery, 1st Battery: Cpt James R. McMullin; Gilmore's Company, West Virginia Cavalry: Lt James Abraham; Harrison's Company, West Virginia Cavalry: Lt Dennis Delaney
Kanawha Division; Col Eliakim P. Scammon	2nd Brigade Col George Crook	11th Ohio: Ltc Augustus H. Coleman (k), Maj Lyman J. Jackson; 28th Ohio: Ltc Gottfried Becker; 36th Ohio: Ltc Melvin Clarke (k), Maj Ebenezer B. Andrews; Schambeck's Company Chicago Dragoons: Cpt Frederick Schambeck; Kentucky Light Artillery, Simmonds' Battery: Cpt Seth J. Simmonds
	Unattached troops	6th New York Cavalry (8 companies): Col Thomas C. Devin; Ohio Cavalry, 3rd Independent Company: Lt Jonas Seamen; 3rd United States, Batteries L and M: Cpt John Edwards, Jr.; 2nd New York, Battery L: Cpt Jacob Roemer

=== XII Corps ===
MG Joseph K. Mansfield (mw)
BG Alpheus S. Williams

Escort:

- 1st Michigan Cavalry, Company L: Cpt Melvin Brewer

Division	Brigade	Regiments and Others
First Division; BG Alpheus S. Williams; BG Samuel W. Crawford (w); BG George H. Gordon	1st Brigade BG Samuel W. Crawford; Col Joseph F. Knipe	10th Maine: Col George L. Beal (w); 28th New York: Cpt William H. H. Mapes; 46th Pennsylvania: Col Joseph F. Knipe, Ltc James L. Selfridge; 124th Pennsylvania: Col Joseph W. Hawley (w), Maj Isaac L. Haldeman; 125th Pennsylvania: Col Jacob C. Higgins; 128th Pennsylvania: Col Samuel Croasdale (k), Ltc William W. Hammersly (w), Maj Joel B. Wanner
First Division; BG Alpheus S. Williams; BG Samuel W. Crawford (w); BG George H. Gordon	3rd Brigade BG George H. Gordon; Col Thomas H. Ruger (w)	27th Indiana: Col Silas Colgrove; 2nd Massachusetts: Col George L. Andrews; 13th New Jersey: Col Ezra A. Carman; 107th New York: Col Robert B. Van Valkenburg; Pennsylvania Zouaves d'Afrique; 3rd Wisconsin: Col Thomas H. Ruger
Second Division; BG George S. Greene	1st Brigade Ltc Hector Tyndale (w); Maj Orrin J. Crane	5th Ohio: Maj John Collins; 7th Ohio: Maj Orrin J. Crane, Cpt Frederick A. Seymour; 66th Ohio: Ltc Eugene Powell (w); 28th Pennsylvania: Maj Ario Pardee, Jr.
Second Division; BG George S. Greene	2nd Brigade Col Henry J. Stainrook	3rd Maryland: Ltc Joseph H. Sudsburg; 102nd New York: Ltc James C. Lane; 111th Pennsylvania: Maj Thomas M. Walker (w)
Second Division; BG George S. Greene	3rd Brigade Col William B. Goodrich (mw); Ltc Jonathan Austin	3rd Delaware: Maj Arthur Maginnis (w), Cpt William J. McKaig; Purnell (Maryland) Legion: Ltc Benjamin L. Simpson; 60th New York: Ltc Charles R. Brundage; 78th New York: Ltc Jonathan Austin, Cpt Henry R. Stagg
	Artillery Cpt Clermont L. Best	Maine Light, 4th Battery: Cpt O'Neill W. Robinson, Jr.; Maine Light, 6th Battery: Cpt Freeman McGilvery; 1st New York Light, Battery M: Cpt George W. Cothran; New York Light, 10th Battery: Cpt John T. Bruen; Pennsylvania Light, Battery E: Cpt Joseph M. Knap; Pennsylvania Light, Battery F: Cpt Robert B. Hampton; 4th United States, Battery F: Lt Edward D. Muhlenberg

=== Cavalry ===
Division	Brigade	Regiments and Others
Cavalry Division; BG Alfred Pleasonton	1st Brigade Maj Charles J. Whiting	5th United States: Cpt Joseph H. McArthur; 6th United States: Cpt William P. Sanders
Cavalry Division; BG Alfred Pleasonton	2nd Brigade Col John F. Farnsworth	8th Illinois: Maj. William H. Medill; 3rd Indiana: Maj George H. Chapman; 1st Massachusetts: Cpt Caspar Crowninshield; 8th Pennsylvania: Cpt Peter Keenan
Cavalry Division; BG Alfred Pleasonton	3rd Brigade Col Richard H. Rush	4th Pennsylvania: Col James H. Childs (k), Ltc James K. Kerr; 6th Pennsylvania: Ltc C. Ross Smith
Cavalry Division; BG Alfred Pleasonton	4th Brigade Col Andrew T. McReynolds	1st New York: Maj Alonzo W. Adams; 12th Pennsylvania: Maj James A. Congdon
Cavalry Division; BG Alfred Pleasonton	5th Brigade Col Benjamin F. Davis	8th New York: Col Benjamin F. Davis; 3rd Pennsylvania: Ltc Samuel W. Owen
Cavalry Division; BG Alfred Pleasonton	Horse Artillery	2nd United States, Battery A: Cpt John C. Tidball; 2nd United States, Batteries B and L: Cpt James M. Robertson; 2nd United States, Battery M: Lt Peter C. Hains; 3rd United States, Batteries C and G: Cpt Horatio G. Gibson
Cavalry Division; BG Alfred Pleasonton	Unattached	15th Pennsylvania (detachment): Col William J. Palmer
