= Peninsula campaign order of battle: Union =

The following Union Army units and commanders were the initial structure on April 4, 1862 of the Union Department of the Potomac during the Peninsula campaign of the American Civil War. This list includes units deployed to the Virginia Peninsula, and those that remained in the Washington area. The Confederate order of battle is listed separately.

== Abbreviations used ==
=== Military rank ===
- MG = Major General
- BG = Brigadier General
- Col = Colonel
- Ltc = Lieutenant Colonel
- Maj = Major
- Cpt = Captain
- Lt = Lieutenant

== Army of the Potomac ==
The following units were the initial organization of the Army of the Potomac on the peninsula.

MG George B. McClellan, Commanding

Headquarters and Body Guard

- Co. A, 4th U.S. Cavalry: Lt James B. McIntire
- Co. E, 4th U.S. Cavalry: Lt William O'Connell
- Oneida Independent Cavalry Company: Cpt Daniel P. Mann
- Sturges' Rifles: Cpt James Steele

Provost Guard

- 2nd U.S. Cavalry: Maj Alfred Pleasonton
- Battalion of 8th U.S. Infantry (Cos. F & G) and 17th U.S. Infantry (Cos. B & D): Maj George L. Willard

=== Staff ===
Col Randolph B. Marcy, Chief of Staff
Maj Granville O. Haller, Commandant of General Headquarters

Function	Individuals
Adjutant BG Seth Williams	Ltc James A. Hardie (aide-de-camp); Cpt Richard B. Irwin
Inspector General Col Delos B. Sackett	Maj Nelson H. Davis
Engineers BG John G. Barnard	Ltc Barton S. Alexander; Cpt Charles S. Stewart; Lt Cyrus B. Comstock; Lt Miles D. McAlester; Lt William E. Merrill; Lt Francis U. Farquhar
Topographical Engineers BG Andrew A. Humphreys	Lt Henry L. Abbot; Lt Orlando G. Wagner; Lt Nicholas Bowen; Lt John Moulder Wilson; Lt James H. Wilson
Medical Corps Charles S. Tripler	Surgeons and Nurses
Quartermaster Maj Stewart Van Vliet	Ltc Rufus Ingalls; Ltc Charles G. Sawtelle
Commissary Col Henry F. Clarke	Col Amos Beckwith; Ltc George Bell; Ltc A. Parker Porter; Cpt Thomas Wilson; Cpt Brownell Granger; Cpt William H. Bell; Cpt John H. Woodward; Cpt W.R. Murphy
Ordnance Cpt Charles P. Kingsbury	Lt Thomas G. Baylor; Other unnamed officers
Provost-Marshal BG Andrew Porter	Maj William H. Wood; Cpt James W. McMillan; Cpt William T. Gentry; Cpt James W. Forsyth; Lt John W. Jones; Lt Charles F. Trowbridge; Lt Calvin D. Mehaffey
Judge Advocate Col Thomas T. Gantt	Unnamed officers
Signal Corps Maj Albert J. Myer	Unnamed officers
Telegraphic Office Maj Thomas Eckert	Mr. A. Harper Caldwell
Balloon Corps Professor Thaddeus S.C. Lowe	Lowe's Aeronauts
Personal Staff	Col Thomas M. Key; Col Edward H. Wright; Col John J. Astor, Jr.; Ltc Albert V. Colburn; Ltc Nelson B. Sweitzer; Ltc Edward McK. Hudson; Ltc Paul Von Radowitz; Maj Herbert Von Hammerstein; Maj William W. Russell (USMC); Maj Ferdinand Lecompte (Swiss Army Engineer); Cpt George A. Custer; Cpt Joseph Kirkland; Cpt Arthur McClellan; Cpt Louis Philippe d'Orleans; Cpt Robert d'Orleans; Cpt Martin T. McMahon; Cpt William P. Mason, Jr.; Cpt William F. Biddle; Cpt Edward A. Raymond

=== II Corps ===
BG Edwin Sumner, Commanding
Ltc Joseph H. Taylor, Adjutant

Division	Brigade	Regiments and others
First Division BG Israel B. Richardson	First Brigade BG Oliver O. Howard	5th New Hampshire: Col Edward E. Cross; 81st Pennsylvania: Col James Miller; 61st New York: Col Francis C. Barlow; 64th New York: Col Thomas J. Parker
First Division BG Israel B. Richardson	Second Brigade BG Thomas Francis Meagher	69th New York: Col Robert Nugent; 63rd New York: Ltc John Burke; 88th New York: Col Henry M. Baker
First Division BG Israel B. Richardson	Third Brigade BG William H. French	52nd New York: Col Paul Frank; 57th New York: Col Samuel K. Zook; 66th New York: Col Joseph C. Pinckney; 53rd Pennsylvania: Col John R. Brooke
First Division BG Israel B. Richardson	Artillery	Batteries A & C, 4th U.S. Artillery: Cpt Francis N. Clarke; Six Napoleons; Battery G, 1st New York Artillery: Cpt John D. Frank; Six 10-lb Parrotts; Battery B, 1st New York Artillery: Cpt Rufus D. Pettit; Six 10-lb Parrotts; Battery A, 2nd New York Artillery: Cpt William H. Hogan; Six 10-lb Parrotts
Second Division; BG John Sedgwick	First Brigade BG Willis A. Gorman	2nd New York State Militia: Col George W.B. Tompkins; 15th Massachusetts: Col Charles Devens; 1st Minnesota: Col Alfred Sully
Second Division; BG John Sedgwick	Second Brigade BG William Wallace Burns	69th Pennsylvania: Col Joshua T. Owen; 71st Pennsylvania: Col Isaac J. Wistar; 72nd Pennsylvania: Col DeWitt Clinton Baxter; 106th Pennsylvania: Col Turner G. Morehead
Second Division; BG John Sedgwick	Third Brigade BG Napoleon J.T. Dana	19th Massachusetts: Col Edward W. Hinks; 20th Massachusetts: Col William R. Lee; 7th Michigan: Col Ira R. Grosvenor; 42nd New York: Col Edmund C. Charles
Second Division; BG John Sedgwick	Artillery	Battery I, 1st U.S. Artillery: Lt Edmund Kirby; Six Napoleons; Battery A, 1st Rhode Island Artillery: Cpt John A. Tompkins; Four 10-lb Parrotts, two 12-lb howitzers; Battery B, 1st Rhode Island Artillery: Cpt Walter O. Bartlett; Four 10-lb Parrotts, two 12-lb howitzers; Battery G, 1st Rhode Island Artillery: Cpt Charles Owen; Six 3-inch ordnance guns
Cavalry reserve	Unbrigaded	8th Illinois Cavalry: Col John F. Farnsworth; 6th New York Cavalry (Cos. D & K): Maj Floyd Clarkson

N.B. The Third Division under BG Louis Blenker was detached in early April and transferred to the Mountain Department

=== III Corps ===
BG Samuel P. Heintzelman, Commanding
Cpt Chauncey McKeever, Chief of Staff

Division	Brigade	Regiments and others
First Division; BG Fitz John Porter	First Brigade BG John H. Martindale	2nd Maine: Col Charles W. Roberts; 18th Massachusetts: Col James Barnes; 22nd Massachusetts: Col Jesse Gove; 25th New York: Col Charles Johnson; 13th New York: Col Elisha Marshall
First Division; BG Fitz John Porter	Second Brigade BG George W. Morell	14th New York: Col James McQuade; 4th Michigan: Col Dwight A. Woodbury; 9th Massachusetts: Col Thomas Cass; 62nd Pennsylvania: Ltc Jacob B. Sweitzer
First Division; BG Fitz John Porter	Third Brigade BG Daniel Butterfield	17th New York: Col Henry S. Lansing; 44th New York: Col Stephen W. Stryker; 12th New York: Col Henry A. Weeks; 83rd Pennsylvania: Col John W. McLane; 16th Michigan: Col Thomas B. Stockton; 1st Berdan Sharpshooters: Col Hiram Berdan
First Division; BG Fitz John Porter	Artillery Cpt Charles Griffin	Battery D, 5th U.S. Artillery: Cpt Charles Griffin; Six 10-lb Parrotts; Battery C, 1st Rhode Island Artillery: Cpt William B. Weeden; Battery C, Massachusetts Artillery: Cpt Augustus C. Martin; Six Napoleons; Battery E, Massachusetts Artillery: Cpt George D. Allen; Six 3-inch ordnance guns
Second Division; BG Joseph Hooker	First Brigade BG Henry Morris Naglee	1st Massachusetts: Col Robert Cowdin; 11th Massachusetts: Col William E. Blaisdell; 26th Pennsylvania: Col William F. Small; 2nd New Hampshire: Col Gilman Marston
Second Division; BG Joseph Hooker	Second Brigade BG Daniel Sickles	70th New York: Col William Dwight; 71st New York: Col George B. Hall; 72nd New York: Col Nelson Taylor; 73rd New York: Col William R. Brewster; 74th New York: Col Charles K. Graham
Second Division; BG Joseph Hooker	Third Brigade ("2nd New Jersey Brigade") Col Samuel H. Starr	5th New Jersey: Col William Joyce Sewell; 6th New Jersey: Col James T. Hatfield; 7th New Jersey: Col Joseph W. Revere; 8th New Jersey: Col Adolphus J. Johnson
Second Division; BG Joseph Hooker	Artillery Cpt Norman J. Hall	Battery H, 1st U.S. Artillery: Cpt Norman J. Hall; Four 10-lb Parrotts, two 12-lb howitzers; 4th New York Independent Battery: Cpt James E. Smith; Six 10-lb Parrotts; 6th New York Independent Battery: Cpt William M. Bramhall; Six 3-inch ordnance guns; Battery D, 1st New York Artillery: Cpt Thomas W. Osborn; Four 3-inch ordnance guns
Third Division; BG Charles Smith Hamilton	First Brigade Col Charles D. Jameson	105th Pennsylvania: Col Amor A. McKnight; 63rd Pennsylvania: Col Alexander Hays; 57th Pennsylvania: Col Charles T. Campbell; 87th New York: Col Stephen Hodge
Third Division; BG Charles Smith Hamilton	Second Brigade BG David B. Birney	38th New York: Col J. H. Hobart Ward; 40th New York: Col Edward J. Riley; 3rd Maine: Col Moses B. Lakeman; 4th Maine: Ltc Elijah Walker
Third Division; BG Charles Smith Hamilton	Third Brigade BG Hiram G. Berry	2nd Michigan: Col Orlando M. Poe; 3rd Michigan: Col Stephen G. Champlin; 5th Michigan: Col Henry D. Terry; 37th New York: Col John H. McCunn
Third Division; BG Charles Smith Hamilton	Artillery Cpt James Thompson	Battery G, 2nd U.S. Artillery: Cpt James Thompson; Six Napoleons; Battery B, New Jersey Artillery: Cpt John E. Beam; Four 10-lb Parrotts, two Napoleons; Battery E, 1st Rhode Island Artillery: Cpt George E. Randolph; Four 10-lb Parrotts, two Napoleons
Cavalry reserve	Unbrigaded	3rd Pennsylvania Cavalry: Col William W. Averell

Porter's Division was combined with Sykes' Division of the Reserve Corps and McCall's Division of the First Corps to form the Fifth Corps (Provisional) on May 18, 1862.

=== IV Corps ===
BG Erasmus D. Keyes, Commanding
Ltc Charles C. Suydam

Division	Brigade	Regiments and others
First Division; BG Darius N. Couch	First Brigade Col Henry Shaw Briggs	2nd Rhode Island: Col Horatio Rogers, Jr.; 7th Massachusetts: Col David Allen Russell; 10th Massachusetts: Col Henry Shaw Briggs; 36th New York: Col Charles H. Innes
First Division; BG Darius N. Couch	Second Brigade BG Lawrence P. Graham	67th New York: Col Julius W. Adams; 65th New York: Col John Cochrane; 23rd Pennsylvania: Col Thomas H. Neill; 31st Pennsylvania: Col David H. Williams; 61st Pennsylvania: Col Oliver H. Rippey
First Division; BG Darius N. Couch	Third Brigade BG John J. Peck	98th Pennsylvania: Col John F. Ballier; 102nd Pennsylvania: Col Thomas A. Rowley; 93rd Pennsylvania: Col James M. McCarter; 62nd New York: Col John L. Riker; 55th New York: Col P. Regis de Trobriand
First Division; BG Darius N. Couch	Artillery	Battery C, 1st Pennsylvania Artillery: Cpt Jeremiah McCarthy; Four 10-lb Parrotts; Battery D, 1st Pennsylvania Artillery: Cpt Edward H. Flood; Four 10-lb Parrotts; Battery E, 1st Pennsylvania Artillery: Cpt Theodore Miller; Four Napoleons; Battery H, 1st Pennsylvania Artillery: Cpt James Brady; Four 10-lb Parrotts
Second Division; BG W.F. "Baldy" Smith	First Brigade BG Winfield Scott Hancock	5th Wisconsin: Col Amasa Cobb; 49th Pennsylvania: Col William H. Irwin; 43rd New York: Col Francis L. Vinton; 6th Maine: Col Hiram Burnham
Second Division; BG W.F. "Baldy" Smith	Second Brigade BG William T.H. Brooks	2nd Vermont: Col Henry H. Whiting; 3rd Vermont: Ltc Breed N. Hyde; 4th Vermont: Col Edwin H. Stoughton; 5th Vermont: Col Henry A. Smalley; 6th Vermont: Ltc Nathan S. Lord
Second Division; BG W.F. "Baldy" Smith	Third Brigade BG John Davidson	33rd New York: Col Robert F. Taylor; 77th New York: Col James B. McKean; 49th New York: Col Daniel D. Bidwell; 7th Maine: Ltc Seldon Connor
Second Division; BG W.F. "Baldy" Smith	Artillery Cpt Romeyn B. Ayres	Battery F, 5th U.S. Artillery: Cpt Romeyn B. Ayres; Four 10-lb Parrotts, two Napoleons; 3rd New York Independent Battery: Cpt Thaddeus P. Mott; Four 10-lb Parrotts, two Napoleons; Battery E, 1st New York Artillery: Cpt Charles C. Wheeler; Four 3-inch ordnance guns; 1st New York Independent Battery: Cpt Terance J. Kennedy; Six 3-inch ordnance guns
Third Division; BG Silas Casey	First Brigade Col William W.H. Davis	104th Pennsylvania: Ltc John W. Neilds; 52nd Pennsylvania: Col John C. Dodge; 56th New York: Col Charles Van Wyck; 100th New York: Col James M. Brown; 11th Maine: Col John C. Caldwell
Third Division; BG Silas Casey	Second Brigade BG William High Keim	85th Pennsylvania: Col Joshua B. Howell; 101st Pennsylvania: Col Joseph H. Williams; 103rd Pennsylvania: Col Theodore F. Lehmann; 96th New York: Col James Fairman
Third Division; BG Silas Casey	Third Brigade BG Innis N. Palmer	85th New York: Col Jonathan S. Belknap; 98th New York: Col William Dutton; 92nd New York: Col Jonah Sanford; 81st New York: Col Edwin Rose; 93rd New York: Col John S. Crocker
Third Division; BG Silas Casey	Artillery Col Guilford D. Bailey	7th New York Independent Battery: Cpt Peter C. Regan; Six 3-inch ordnance guns; 8th New York Independent Battery: Cpt Butler Fitch; Six 3-inch ordnance guns; Battery A, 1st New York Artillery: Cpt Thomas H. Bates; Six Napoleons; Battery H, 1st New York Artillery: Cpt Joseph Spratt; Four 3-inch ordnance guns
Cavalry Reserve	Unbrigaded	6th New York Cavalry (Cos. F & H): ?

W.F. Smith's Division was combined with Franklin's Division of the First Corps to form the Sixth Corps (Provisional) on May 18, 1862.

=== Reserves ===
Division	Brigade	Regiments and others
Cavalry; BG Philip St. George Cooke	First Brigade BG William H. Emory	5th U.S. Cavalry: Cpt Charles J. Whiting; 6th U.S. Cavalry: Maj Lawrence A. Williams; 6th Pennsylvania Cavalry: Col Richard H. Rush
Cavalry; BG Philip St. George Cooke	Second Brigade Col George A.H. Blake	1st U.S. Cavalry: Ltc William N. Grier; 8th Pennsylvania Cavalry: Col David McM. Gregg; Barker's Squadron, Illinois Cavalry: Cpt Charles W. Barker
Artillery Col Henry J. Hunt	Horse Artillery Brigade Ltc William Hays	Battery A, 2nd U.S. Artillery: Cpt John C. Tidball; Six 3-inch ordnance rifles; Batteries B & L, 2nd U.S. Artillery: Cpt James M. Robertson; Six 3-inch ordnance rifles; Battery M, 2nd U.S. Artillery: Cpt Henry Benson; Six 3-inch ordnance rifles; Batteries C & G, 3rd U.S. Artillery: Cpt Horatio G. Gibson; Six 3-inch ordnance rifles
Artillery Col Henry J. Hunt	Second Brigade Ltc George W. Getty	Battery K, 1st U.S. Artillery: Cpt William M. Graham; Six Napoleons; Batteries E & G, 1st U.S. Artillery: Lt Alanson M. Randol; Six Napoleons; Battery E, 2nd U.S. Artillery: Cpt J. Howard Carlisle; Six 20-lb Parrotts; Batteries L & M, 3rd U.S. Artillery: Cpt John Edwards, Jr.; Six 10-lb Parrotts; Batteries F & K, 3rd U.S. Artillery: Cpt La Rhett L. Livingston; Four 10-lb Parrotts; Battery G, 4th U.S. Artillery: Lt Charles H. Morgan; Six Napoleons; Battery K, 4th U.S. Artillery: Lt Francis W. Seeley; Six Napoleons; Battery I, 5th U.S. Artillery: Cpt Stephen H. Weed; Six 3-inch ordnance guns; Battery K, 5th U.S. Artillery: Cpt John R. Smead; Four Napoleons; Battery A, 5th U.S. Artillery: Cpt Adelbert Ames; Four 10-lb Parrotts, two Napoleons
Artillery Col Henry J. Hunt	Third Brigade Maj Albert Arndt	Battery A, 1st New York Artillery Battalion: Cpt Otto Diedrich; Six 20-lb Parrotts; Battery B, 1st New York Artillery Battalion: Cpt Adolph Voegele; Four 20-lb Parrotts; Battery C, 1st New York Artillery Battalion: Cpt John Knieriem; Four 20-lb Parrotts; Battery D, 1st New York Artillery Battalion: Cpt Edward Grimm; Six 32-lb howitzers
Engineers	Volunteers BG Daniel Phineas Woodbury	15th New York: Col J. McLeod Murphy; 50th New York: Col Charles B. Stuart
Engineers	Regulars Cpt James Chatham Duane	Co. A, U.S. Engineers: Lt Chauncey B. Reese; Co. B, U.S. Engineers: Lt Charles E. Cross; Co. C, U.S. Engineers: Lt Orville E. Babcock
Engineers	Artillery Siege Train	1st Connecticut Heavy Artillery: Col Robert O. Tyler
Infantry	Regulars BG George Sykes	2nd U.S. Infantry (9 companies): Ltc William Chapman; 3rd U.S. Infantry (7 companies): ?; 4th U.S. Infantry (10 companies): Ltc Robert C. Buchanan; 6th U.S. Infantry (10 companies): Cpt Levi C. Bootes; 10th & 17th U.S. Infantry (8 companies): ?; 11th U.S. Infantry (6 companies): Cpt DeLancey Floyd-Jones; 12th U.S. Infantry (8 companies): ?; 14th U.S. Infantry (9 companies): ?; 5th New York (Duryee's Zouaves): Col Gouverneur K. Warren

Sykes' Division was combined with Porter's Division of the Third Corps and McCall's Division of the First Corps to form the Fifth Corps (Provisional) on May 18, 1862.

== Other Troops from the Department of the Potomac ==
The following troops were part of the Department of the Potomac in March and April 1861, but were detached to maintain defense of the Potomac River line.

=== I Corps ===
On April 4, the First Corps was renamed the Department of the Rappahannock, with authority to include the District of Columbia, Maryland between the Potomac and Patuxent, and Virginia between the Blue Ridge and the Fredericksburg & Richmond Railroad.

MG Irvin McDowell, Commanding
Ltc Edmund Schriver, Chief of Staff

Unattached cavalry

- 1st New York Cavalry: Col Andrew T. McReynolds
- 2nd New York Cavalry: Col J. Mansfield Davies
- 4th New York Cavalry: Col Christian F. Dickel

Sharpshooters

- 2nd Regiment, Berdan Sharpshooters: Col Henry A.V. Post

Division	Brigade	Regiments and others
First Division; BG William B. Franklin	First Brigade BG Philip Kearny until Apr 30; BG Georg W. Taylor	1st New Jersey: Lt Col Robert McAllister; 2nd New Jersey: Col Isaac M. Tucker; 3rd New Jersey: Col George W. Taylor; 4th New Jersey: Col James H. Simpson
First Division; BG William B. Franklin	Second Brigade BG Henry Slocum	16th New York: Col Joseph Howland; 27th New York: Col Joseph J. Bartlett; 5th Maine: Col Clark S. Edwards; 96th Pennsylvania: Col Henry L. Cake
First Division; BG William B. Franklin	Third Brigade BG John Newton	18th New York: Col William H. Young; 31st New York: Col Calvin E. Pratt; 32nd New York: Col Roderick N. Matheson; 95th Pennsylvania: Col John M. Gosline
First Division; BG William B. Franklin	Artillery Cpt Edward R. Platt	Battery D, 2nd U.S. Artillery: Cpt Edward R. Platt; Six Napoleons; Battery A, Massachusetts Artillery: Cpt Josiah Porter; Four 10-lb Parrotts, two 12-lb howitzers; Battery A, New Jersey Artillery: Cpt William Hexamer; Four 10-lb Parrotts, two 12-lb howitzers; Battery F, 1st New York Artillery: Brady or Cpt William R. Wilson?; Four 3-inch ordnance guns
Second Division (Pennsylvania Reserves); BG George A. McCall	First Brigade BG John F. Reynolds	1st Pennsylvania Reserves: Col R. Biddle Roberts; 2nd Pennsylvania Reserves: Col William McCandless; 5th Pennsylvania Reserves: Col Seneca G. Simmons; 8th Pennsylvania Reserves: Col George S. Hays
Second Division (Pennsylvania Reserves); BG George A. McCall	Second Brigade BG George Meade	3rd Pennsylvania Reserves: Col Horatio G. Sickel; 4th Pennsylvania Reserves: Col Albert L. Magilton; 7th Pennsylvania Reserves: Col Elisha B. Harvey; 11th Pennsylvania Reserves: Col Thomas F. Gallagher
Second Division (Pennsylvania Reserves); BG George A. McCall	Third Brigade BG Edward Ord	6th Pennsylvania Reserves: Col William Sinclair; 9th Pennsylvania Reserves: Col Conrad F. Jackson; 10th Pennsylvania Reserves: Col John S. McCalmont; 12th Pennsylvania Reserves: Col John H. Taggart
Second Division (Pennsylvania Reserves); BG George A. McCall	Skirmishers	1st Pennsylvania Reserve Rifles (Bucktails): Major Roy Stone
Second Division (Pennsylvania Reserves); BG George A. McCall	Artillery Cpt Truman Seymour	Battery C, 5th U.S. Artillery: Cpt Truman Seymour; Six Napoleons; Battery A, 1st Pennsylvania Artillery: Cpt Hezekiah Easton; Four Napoleons; Battery B, 1st Pennsylvania Artillery: Cpt James H. Cooper; Six 10-lb Parrotts; Battery G, 1st Pennsylvania Artillery: Cpt Mark Kern; Six 12-pounders
Third Division; BG Rufus King	First Brigade BG Christopher C. Augur	84th New York (14th Brooklyn): Col Edward Brush Fowler; 22nd New York: Col Walter Phelps; 24th New York: Col Timothy Sullivan; 30th New York: Col Edward Frisby
Third Division; BG Rufus King	Second Brigade BG Marsena R. Patrick	80th New York: Col George W. Pratt; 21st New York: Col William F. Rogers; 23rd New York: Col Henry C. Hoffman; 35th New York: Col William C. Brown
Third Division; BG Rufus King	Third Brigade BG John Gibbon	2nd Wisconsin: Col Edgar O'Connor; 6th Wisconsin: Col Lysander Cutler; 7th Wisconsin: Col William W. Robinson; 19th Indiana: Col Solomon Meredith
Third Division; BG Rufus King	Artillery	Battery B, 4th U.S. Artillery: Lt Joseph B. Campbell; Six Napoleons; Battery D, 1st Rhode Island Artillery: Cpt John A. Monroe; Six 10-lb Parrotts; Battery A, New Hampshire Artillery: Cpt George A. Gerrish; Six Napoleons; Durell's Independent Battery (D), Pennsylvania Artillery: Cpt George W. Durrell?; Six 10-lb Parrotts

McCall's Division transferred to the Peninsula and was combined with Porter's Division of the Third Corps and Sykes' Division of the Reserve Corps to form the Fifth Corps (Provisional) on May 18, 1862. Franklin's Division transferred to the Peninsula and was combined with W.F. Smith's Division of the Fourth Corps to form the Sixth Corps (Provisional) on May 18, 1862.

=== V Corps ===
On April 4, the Fifth Corps was renamed the Department of Shenandoah with authority over Maryland between the Blue Ridge and Flintstone Creek, Virginia between the Blue Ridge and the modern-day border with West Virginia.

MG Nathaniel P. Banks, Commanding
Cpt Louis H. Pelouze, Acting Assistant Adjutant General

Unattached Infantry

- 28th Pennsylvania: Col John W. Geary
- 4th Regiment Potomac Home Brigade (Maryland): ?

Division	Brigade	Regiments and others
First Division; BG Alpheus S. Williams	First Brigade Col Dudley Donnelly	28th New York: Ltc Edwin F. Brown; 5th Connecticut: Col George D. Chapman; 46th Pennsylvania: Col Joseph F. Knipe; 12th Indiana: ?; 13th Massachusetts: Col Samuel H. Leonard
First Division; BG Alpheus S. Williams	Second Brigade BG John Joseph Abercrombie	12th Massachusetts: Col Fletcher Webster; 2nd Massachusetts: Col George H. Gordon; 16th Indiana: ?; 1st Potomac Home Brigade (Maryland): Col William P. Maulsby; Zouaves d'Afrique (one company): Cpt Charles H. T. Collis
First Division; BG Alpheus S. Williams	Third Brigade Col George Henry Gordon	83rd New York: Col John W. Stiles; 29th Pennsylvania: Col John K. Murphy; 27th Indiana: Col Silas Colgrove; 3rd Wisconsin: Col Thomas H. Ruger
First Division; BG Alpheus S. Williams	Artillery Cpt Clermont L. Best	Battery F, 4th U.S. Artillery: Cpt Clermont L. Best; Six Napoleons; 1st Maryland Battery (Independent Battery F, Pennsylvania Artillery): Cpt Robert B. Hampton; Four 10-lb Parrotts; 2nd Maryland Battery (Independent Battery C, Pennsylvania Artillery): Cpt James Thompson; Four 10-lb Parrotts; Battery F, 1st Pennsylvania Artillery: Cpt Ezra W. Matthews; Six 3-inch ordnance guns; Battery M, 1st New York: Cpt George W. Cothran; Six 10-lb Parrotts; Independent Battery E, Pennsylvania Artillery: Cpt Joseph E. Knapp; Six 10-lb Parrotts; 15th Independent Battery, New York Artillery: Cpt Henry J. McMahon; Six 3-inch ordnance guns
Second Division BG James Shields	First Brigade Col Nathan Kimball	14th Indiana: Ltc William Harrow; 4th Ohio; 8th Ohio: Col Samuel S. Carroll; 67th Ohio: Col Alvin C. Voris; 7th Virginia: Col James Evans; 84th Pennsylvania: Maj Walter Barrett
Second Division BG James Shields	Second Brigade Col Jeremiah C. Sullivan	5th Ohio: Col Samuel H. Dunning; 62nd Ohio: Col Francis Bates Pond; 66th Ohio: Col Charles Candy; 13th Indiana: Ltc Robert S. Foster; 39th Illinois: Col Thomas O. Osborn
Second Division BG James Shields	Third Brigade Col Erastus B. Tyler	7th Ohio: Ltc William R. Creighton; 29th Ohio: Col Louis P. Buckley; 7th Indiana: Col James Gavin; 1st Virginia: Col Joseph Thoburn; 110th Pennsylvania: Col William D. Lewis; Andrew Sharpshooters: Cpt John Saunders
Second Division BG James Shields	Artillery Cpt Joseph C. Clark	Battery E, 4th U.S. Artillery: Cpt Joseph C. Clark; Six 10-lb Parrotts; Battery A, 1st Virginia Artillery: Cpt John Jenks; Four 10-lb Parrotts, two Napoleons; Battery B, 1st Virginia Artillery: Lt John V. Keeper; Two 10-lb Parrotts; Battery H, 1st Ohio Artillery: Cpt James F. Huntington; Six 13-lb James; Battery L, 1st Ohio Artillery: Cpt Frank C. Gibbs; Two 12-lb howitzers, four Napoleons; Battery, 4th Ohio Artillery
Cavalry	Unbrigaded	1st Maine Cavalry: Col Samuel H. Allen; 1st Vermont Cavalry: Col Lemuel Platt; 1st Michigan Cavalry: Col Thornton F. Brodhead; 1st Pennsylvania Cavalry: Col George D. Bayard; 1st Rhode Island Cavalry: Col Alfred N. Duffié; 5th New York Cavalry: Col Othniel De Forest; 8th New York Cavalry: Col Samuel J. Crook; Keys' Battalion, Pennsylvania Cavalry: Lt Hugh Keys; Eighteen companies, Maryland Cavalry: Col Henry A. Cole; One company, Virginia Cavalry: Col Henry Anisansel

Shields' Division was transferred to the Department of the Rappahannock on May 10, 1862

=== District of Washington ===
BG James S. Wadsworth, Commanding

Regiments and others	Camp Location
1st New Jersey Cavalry: Col William Halstead	Alexandria City
4th Pennsylvania Cavalry: Col James H. Childs	East of the Capitol
10th New Jersey: Col William Bryan	Bladensburg Road
104th New York: Col John Rohrbach	Kalorama Heights
1st Wisconsin Heavy Artillery: ?	Fort Cass (Alexandria Co.)
New York Artillery (three batteries): ?	Fort Ethan Allen (Alexandria Co.); Fort Marcy (Fairfax Co.)
Depot of New York Light Artillery: ?	Camp Barry
2nd District of Columbia: Col Charles M. Alexander	Washington City
26th Pennsylvania: Col William F. Small	G Street Wharf
26th New York: Col William H. Christian	Fort Lyon (present-day Huntington)
95th New York: Col George H. Biddle	Camp Thomas
94th New York: Col Henry K. Viele; Detachment of 88th Pennsylvania: Maj George W. Gile	Alexandria City
91st Pennsylvania: Col Edgar I. Gregory	Franklin Square Barracks (Franklin Square)
4th New York Heavy Artillery: Col T.D. Doubleday	Fort Carroll (present-day Joint Base Anacostia-Bolling); Fort Greble (also present-day JBAB)
112th Pennsylvania: Col Charles Angeroth	Fort Saratoga
76th New York: Ltc John D. Shaul	Fort Massachusetts (Washington Co.)
59th New York: Col William L. Tidball	Fort Pennsylvania (Tenleytown)
Detachment of 88th Pennsylvania: ?	Fort Good Hope
99th Pennsylvania: Col Peter Fritz	Fort Mahon
2nd New York Light Artillery: ?	Fort Ward (present-day Alexandria); Fort Worth (present-day Alexandria); Fort Blenker (present-day Fairlington)
107th Pennsylvania: Col Thomas A. Zeigel; 54th Pennsylvania: Col Jacob M. Campbell	Kendall Green (present-day Gallaudet University)
Dickenson's Light Artillery (16th Independent New York Battery); 86th New York: Col Benajah P. Baily; Detachment of 88th Pennsylvania: Col George P. McLean	East of the Capitol
1st Massachusetts Heavy Artillery: Col Thomas R. Tannatt; 56th Pennsylvania: Col Sullivan A. Meredith	Fort Albany; Fort Tillinghast; Fort Richardson; Fort Runyon; Fort Jackson; Fort Barnard; Fort Craig; Fort Scott (all in present-day Arlington)
Detachment of 4th U.S. Artillery: ?; 37th New York: Col John H. McCunn	Fort Washington (present-day Fort Washington, Maryland)
97th New York: Col Charles W. Wheelock; 101st New York: Col Enrico Fardella; ~~91st New York: Col Jacob Van Sandt~~; 12th Virginia: Col John B. Klunk	Fort Corcoran (present-day Rosslyn)

Railroad Guards
Col Dixon S. Miles

- 6th New York Cavalry (Cos. A, B, C, E, G, I, K, & M dismounted): Col Thomas Devin
- ~~10th New York Cavalry (dismounted): Col John Lemmon~~
- 11th New York Cavalry (dismounted): Col James B. Swain
- 2nd Pennsylvania Cavalry (dismounted): Col Richard Butler Price

=== Troops Around Baltimore ===
On March 22, the Middle Department was created with authority over Pennsylvania, New Jersey, Delaware, and the Eastern Shore of Maryland and Virginia, as well as the Maryland counties of Cecil, Hartford, Baltimore, and Anne Arundel. Dix remained in command.

MG John A. Dix, Commanding
Maj Daniel Tompkins Van Buren, Chief of Staff and Acting Assistant Adjutant General

Type of Units	Regiments and others
Cavalry	1st Maryland Cavalry: Cpt Henry A. Cole?; Purnell (Maryland) Legion Cavalry: Cpt Robert E. Duvall
Artillery	Battery I, 2nd U.S. Artillery: Cpt Albert J.S. Molinard; Battery A, Maryland Light Artillery: Cpt John W. Wolcott; Battery L, 1st New York Artillery: Cpt John A. Reynolds; Independent Battery ?, Pennsylvania Artillery: ?; Independent Battery ?, Pennsylvania Artillery: ?
Infantry	3rd New York: Col Samuel M. Alford; 4th New York: Col Alfred W. Taylor; 11th Pennsylvania: Col Richard Coulter; 87th Pennsylvania: Col George Hay; 111th Pennsylvania: Col Matthew Schlaudecker; Detachment, 21st Massachusetts: ?; 2nd Delaware: Col W. Henry Wharton; 2nd Maryland: Col John Sommer; 1st Eastern Shore Home Guard (Maryland): Col James Wallace; 2nd Eastern Shore Home Guard (Maryland): Col Robert S. Rogers; Purnell (Maryland) Legion Infantry: Col Samuel L. Graham

== Department of Virginia ==
The Department of Virginia constituted an area 60 miles from Fort Monroe. McClellan had received permission to absorb it into his army as a division of the First Corps, but it was rescinded shortly after he arrived on the Peninsula.

MG John E. Wool, Commanding

Location	Regiments and others
Fort Monroe Maj Joseph Roberts	10th New York: Col John E. Bendix; 99th New York (2 cos.): Maj Richard Nixon; 7th Independent Battery, Massachusetts Artillery: Cpt Phineas Alonzo Davis; Detachment, 4th U.S. Artillery: ?; 2nd Independent Battery, Wisconsin Artillery: Cpt Ernst F. Herzberg; 4th Independent Battery, Wisconsin Artillery: Cpt John F. Vallee
Camp Hamilton Col Max Weber	1st Delaware: Col John W. Andrews; 16th Massachusetts: Col Powell T. Wyman; 1st Michigan: Col John C. Robinson; 20th New York: Ltc Francis Weiss; 99th New York (6 cos.): Col David W. Wardop; 58th Pennsylvania: Col John R. Jones; Battery D, 4th U.S. Artillery: Cpt Frederick M. Follett; 11th Pennsylvania Cavalry: Col Joseph Harlan; 1st New York Mounted Rifles (4 cos.): Maj Charles C. Dodge
Camp Butler BG Joseph K. F. Mansfield	20th Indiana: Col William L. Brown; 5th Maryland: Col William L. Schley; 29th Massachusetts: Col Ebenezer W. Peirce; 1st New York: Col Garrett Dyckman; 2nd New York: Col Joseph B. Carr; 7th New York: Col Edward Kapff; 11th New York: Col Charles McK. Loeser; Battery L, 4th U.S. Artillery: Cpt Robert V.W. Howard
Fort Wool Ltc Gustave B. Helleday	99th New York (2 cos.): Ltc Gustave B. Helleday
