= 22nd New York Infantry Regiment =

- Active: June 6, 1861, to June 19, 1863
- Country: United States
- Allegiance: Union
- Branch: Infantry
- Part of: Eastern Iron Brigade
- Engagements: Battle of Gainesville (1862)

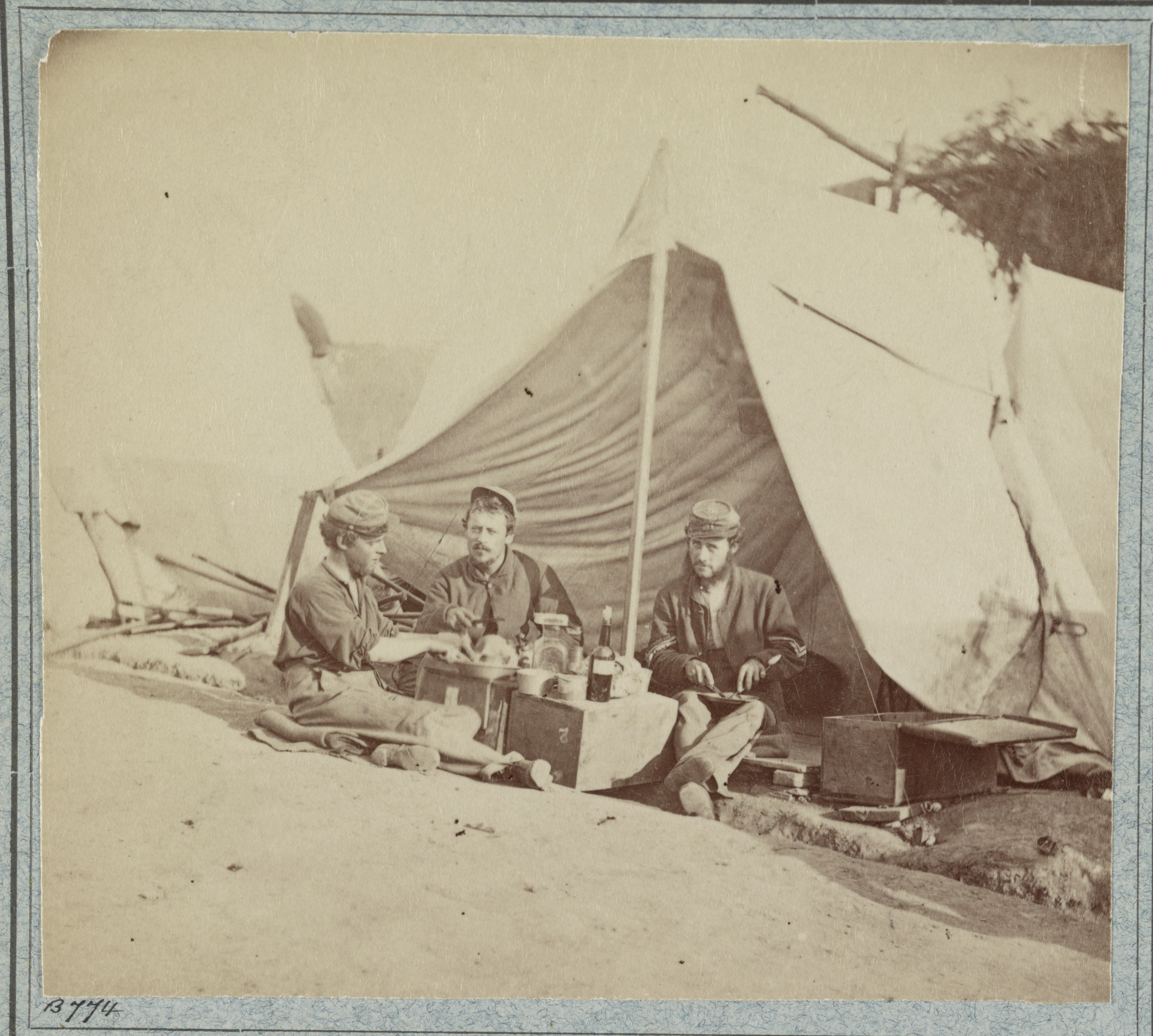

The 22nd New York Infantry Regiment (not to be confused with the 22nd New York National Guard) was a volunteer regiment of the Union Army in the American Civil War.

== History ==
The regiment was formed with 800 men in 1861 and was placed in a brigade along with the 24th New York, 30th New York, 84th New York (14th Brooklyn) (also known as the 14th New York State Militia), and for a number of months, the 2nd U.S. Sharpshooters (a regiment under the respected Colonel Henry A. V. Post). The brigade was the First Brigade in the First Corps of the Army of the Potomac, and Colonel Walter Phelps and the regiments of the brigade referred to themselves as the Iron Brigade of the East and served with the Division's more famous Fourth Brigade which would earn the title "Iron Brigade of the West" in September 1862 during Battle of South Mountain in the Maryland Campaign.

Colonel Walter Phelps was chosen as the original commander of the regiment, and after his promotion to the brigade commander, Major John McKie became regimental commander. The regiment suffered its first fatality when passing through Baltimore, when a man was killed by friendly fire during confusion among a mob. It would go on to serve in the Army of the Potomac's I Corps and III Corps, and fight at the battles of Second Bull Run, South Mountain, Antietam, Fredericksburg, and Chancellorsville.

The regiment was mustered out of service on June 19, 1863, and those men who had signed three-year enlistments were transferred to the 76th New York and 93rd New York.

== Casualties ==
Casualties during the course of the war were as follows:

- Killed in action: 11 officers, 61 enlisted
- Died of disease: 1 officer, 27 enlisted
- Died as POW: 1 enlisted

== Spanish–American War unit ==
A unit with the lineage of the 13th New York State Militia, also designated the 22nd New York Volunteer Infantry Regiment, served in the Spanish–American War. It mustered out on November 23, 1898. On February 19, 1902, this regiment was converted into a regiment of engineers retaining its number.

== See also ==
- List of New York Civil War regiments
