= Iron Brigade =

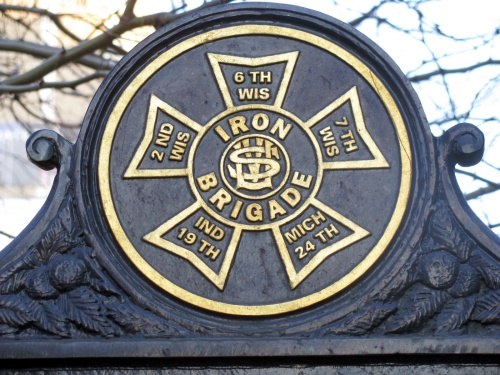
- Iron Brigade monument at Gettysburg National Military Park
- Active: October 1861–June 1865
- Country: United States of America
- Allegiance: Union
- Branch: Union Army
- Type: Infantry
- Size: 19th Indiana Infantry Regiment; 24th Michigan Infantry Regiment; 2nd Wisconsin Infantry Regiment; 6th Wisconsin Infantry Regiment; 7th Wisconsin Infantry Regiment
- Part of: 1st Division, I Corps, Army of the Potomac
- Nicknames: The Black Hats; Black Hat Brigade; Iron Brigade of the West; King's Wisconsin Brigade
- Engagements: American Civil War; Second Battle of Bull Run; Battle of South Mountain; Battle of Antietam; Battle of Fredericksburg; Battle of Chancellorsville; Battle of Gettysburg; Battle of the Wilderness; Battle of Spotsylvania Court House; Battle of Cold Harbor; Battle of Hatcher's Run; Battle of Five Forks

Commanders
- Notable commanders: Brig. Gen. Rufus King; Brig. Gen. John Gibbon; Brig. Gen. Solomon Meredith; Col. William W. Robinson; Brig. Gen. Edward S. Bragg

The Iron Brigade, also known as The Black Hats, Black Hat Brigade, Iron Brigade of the West, and originally King's Wisconsin Brigade, was an infantry brigade in the Union Army of the Potomac during the American Civil War. Although it fought entirely in the Eastern Theater, it was composed of regiments from three Western states that are now within the region of the Midwest: Wisconsin, Indiana, and Michigan. Noted for its excellent discipline, ferocity in battle, and extraordinarily strong morale, the Iron Brigade suffered a higher percentage of soldiers killed in combat or from battle wounds than any other brigade in the Union army during the war.

The nickname "Iron Brigade," with its connotation of fighting men with iron dispositions, was applied formally or informally to a number of units in the Civil War and in later conflicts. The Iron Brigade of the West was the unit that received the most lasting publicity in its use of the nickname.

The brigade fought in the battles of Second Bull Run, South Mountain, Antietam, Fredericksburg, Chancellorsville, Gettysburg, Wilderness, Spotsylvania, Cold Harbor, Petersburg, Hatcher's Run, and Five Forks. Due to significant casualties at Gettysburg, some eastern regiments were added to the Iron Brigade. For the rest of the war, it was not an all-Western brigade.

== Nickname ==
The Iron Brigade initially consisted of the 2nd, 6th, and 7th Wisconsin Volunteer Infantry Regiments, the 19th Indiana, Battery B of the 4th U.S. Light Artillery, and was later joined by the 24th Michigan. This particular composition of men, from the three Western states, led it to be sometimes referred to as the "Iron Brigade of the West". They were known throughout the war as the "Black Hats" because they wore the black 1858 model Hardee hats issued to Army regulars, rather than the blue forage caps worn by most other Union Army volunteer units.

The all-Western brigade, composed of Wisconsin, Michigan and Indiana troops, earned their famous nickname, while under the command of Brig. Gen. John Gibbon, who led the brigade into its first battle. On August 28, 1862, during the preliminary phases of the Second Battle of Bull Run, it stood up against attacks from a superior force under Maj. Gen Thomas J. "Stonewall" Jackson at Brawner's Farm, during the waning hours of August 28, 1862. The brigade lost 800 casualties, the 2nd Wisconsin losing 276 out of 430 who went into the fight, and at least half of their wounded being shot twice.

The designation "Iron Brigade" is said to have originated during the brigade's action at Turners Gap, during the Battle of South Mountain, a prelude to the Battle of Antietam in September 1862. Maj. Gen. Joseph Hooker, commanding I Corps, approached Army of the Potomac commander Maj. Gen. George B. McClellan, seeking orders. As the Western men advanced up the National Road, forcing the Confederate line back to the gap, McClellan asked, "What troops are those fighting in the Pike?" Hooker replied, "[Brigadier] General Gibbon's brigade of Western men." McClellan stated, "They must be made of iron."

Hooker said that the brigade had performed even more superbly at Second Bull Run. To this, McClellan said that the brigade consisted of the "best troops in the world". Hooker supposedly was elated and rode off without his orders. There are a few stories related to the origin, but the men immediately adopted the name, which was quickly used in print after South Mountain.

== History ==
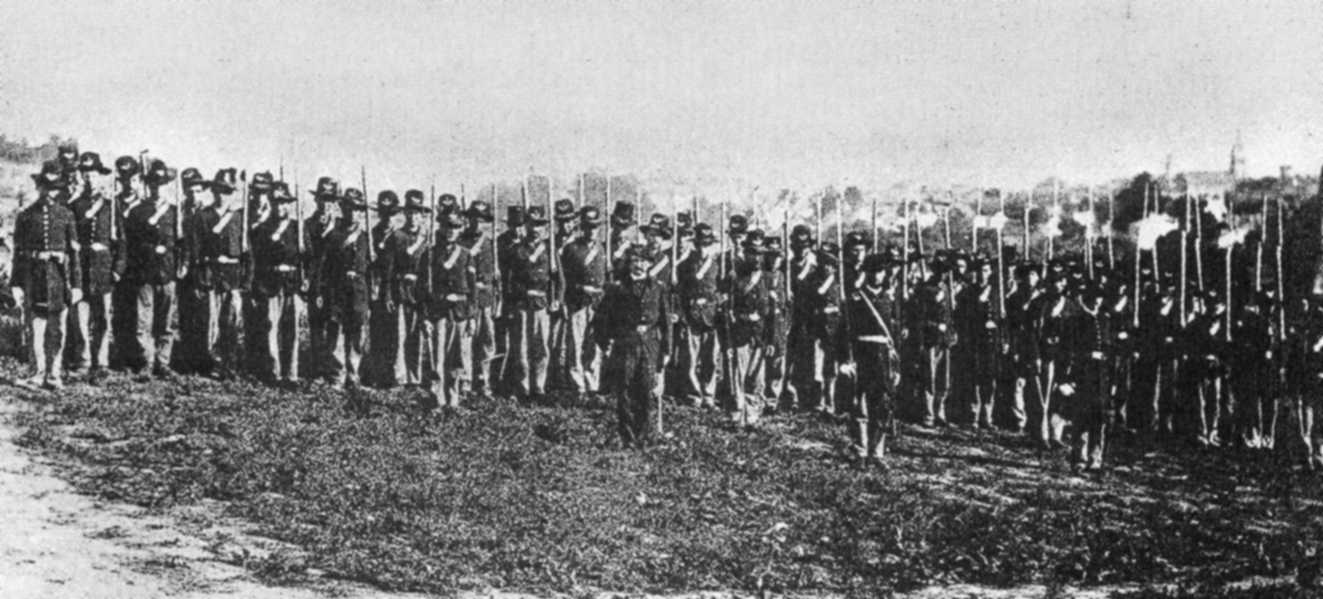
Soldiers in the 7th Wisconsin Volunteer Infantry Regiment, Company I, of the Iron Brigade, in Virginia, 1862

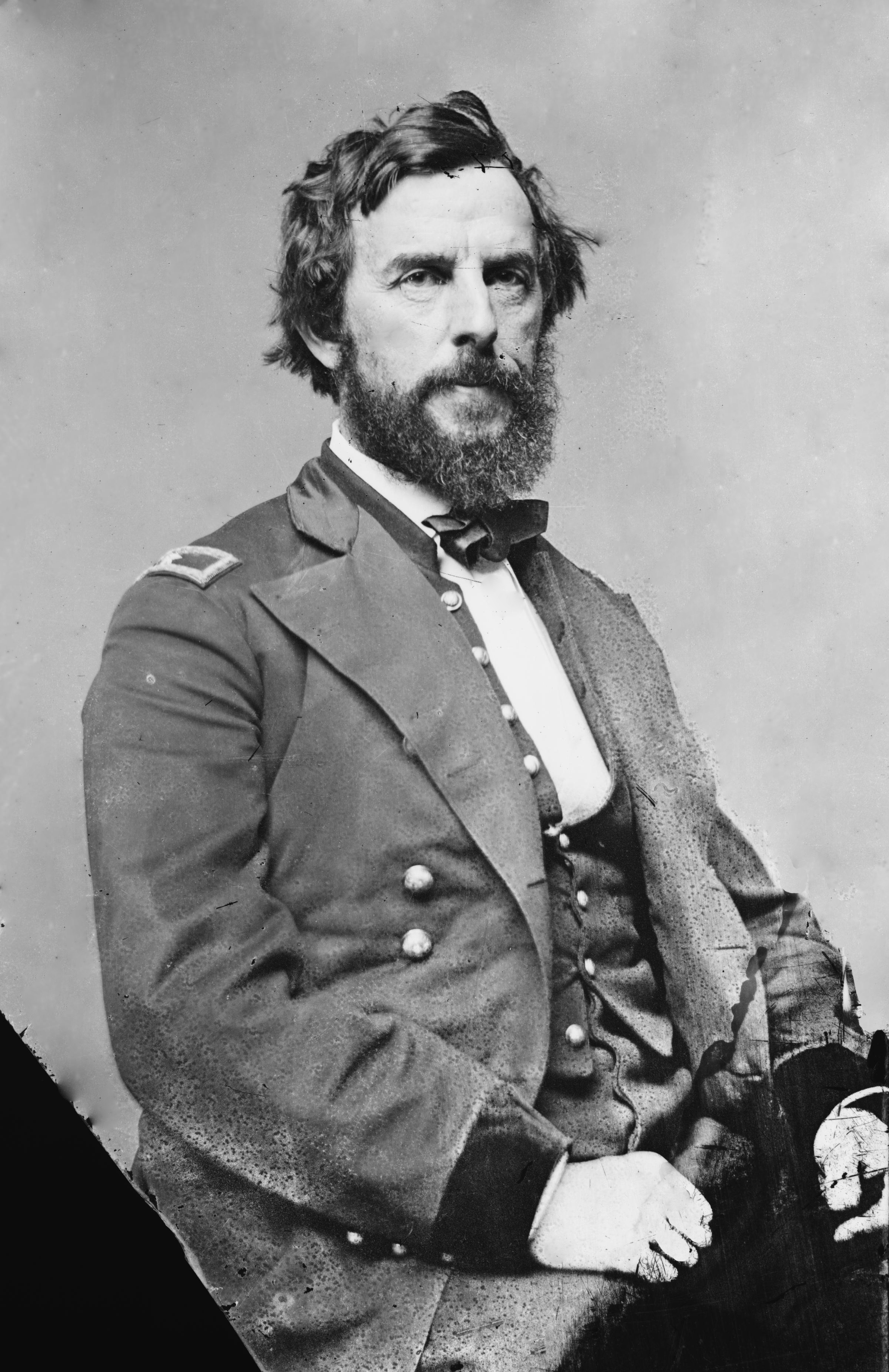
Rufus King, the founder and original commander of the Wisconsin Iron Brigade

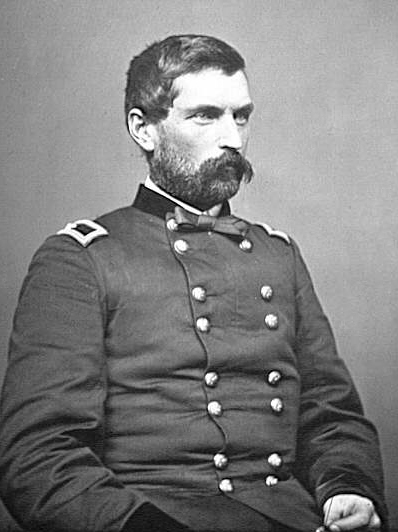
John Gibbon, the commander of the combined three-state Western Iron Brigade

The unit that eventually became known as the Iron Brigade was activated on October 1, 1861, upon the arrival in Washington, D.C., of the 7th Wisconsin. It was combined into a brigade with the 2nd and 6th Wisconsin, and the 19th Indiana, under the command of Brig. Gen. Rufus King and were originally known as King's Wisconsin Brigade. The governor of Wisconsin, Alexander Randall, had hoped to see the formation of an entirely Wisconsin brigade, but the Army unwittingly frustrated his plans by transferring the 5th Wisconsin from King's brigade and including the Hoosiers instead. This brigade was initially designated the 3rd Brigade of Maj. Gen. Irvin McDowell's division of the Army of the Potomac, and then the 3rd Brigade, I Corps.

McDowell's I Corps did not join the bulk of the Army of the Potomac in the Peninsula Campaign. In June 1862 it was reflagged the III Corps of Maj. Gen. John Pope's Army of Virginia. Now under the command of John Gibbon, a regular Army officer from North Carolina who chose to stay with the Union, King's brigade was reflagged the 4th Brigade, 1st Division, III Corps, and it saw its first combat in the Northern Virginia Campaign, fighting at Brawner's Farm, August 28, 1862, where they received their deadly baptism of fire. Gibbon's brigade lost 725 men out of 1,900, the 2nd Wisconsin losing 276 out of 430 men. Almost immediately following the Union defeat in the Second Battle of Bull Run, the III Corps was transferred back to the Army of the Potomac and redesignated the I Corps, under the command of Joseph Hooker. Gibbon's brigade was reflagged yet again, becoming the 4th Brigade, 1st Division, I Corps.

The brigade next went into action at The Battle of South Mountain, September 14, 1862, where they received their coveted nickname. Then again at the Battle of Antietam, September 17, 1862, where the brigade was heavily engaged in the cornfield. Of the 800 men of the Iron Brigade engaged at Antietam, 343 were killed or wounded. The 6th Wisconsin lost 150 out of the 280 men they brought into battle that day.

The 24th Michigan Volunteer Infantry Regiment joined the brigade on October 8, 1862, prior to the Battle of Fredericksburg in December. The Iron Brigade was not heavily engaged in the battle of Fredericksburg, besides for some minor actions by the 24th Michigan. In April, 1863 the Iron Brigade would raid Port Royal, Virginia with the 24th Michigan taking the lead during the raid, losing no casualties during the raid. On February 27, 1863, the brigade, now under the command of Brig. Gen. Solomon Meredith, was redesignated the 1st Brigade, 1st Division, I Corps. The 6th Wisconsin and the 24th Michigan took part in the attacks at Fitzhugh's Crossing, April 29, 1863, losing a combined total casualty list of 58.

The brigade took pride in its designation, "1st Brigade, 1st Division, I Corps", under which it played a prominent role in the first day of the Battle of Gettysburg, July 1, 1863. It repulsed the first Confederate offensive through Herbst's Woods, led by the 2nd Wisconsin, capturing much of Brig. Gen. James J. Archer's brigade, and Archer himself. The 6th Wisconsin, along with 100 men of the brigade guard, are remembered for their famous charge on an unfinished railroad cut north and west of the town, where they captured the flag of the 2nd Mississippi and took hundreds of Confederate prisoners.

The rest of the Iron Brigade were counterattacked in the early afternoon of July 1. The Brigade initially held their ground against the rebel counterattack. The pressure was eventually too heavy, and the Brigade slowly fell back to Seminary Ridge. The Brigade survivors defended the north slope of Culp's Hill on July 2,3, where the 6th Wisconsin made a night counterattack to restore Union positions previously lost to Confederate troops. Out of the 1,883 men the Brigade initially went to battle with, only 671 reported for duty at the battle's end.

The Iron Brigade, proportionately, suffered the most casualties of any brigade in the Civil War. For example, 61%, 1,153 out of 1,885, were casualties at Gettysburg. Similarly, the 2nd Wisconsin, which suffered 77% casualties at Gettysburg, suffered the third highest total throughout the war. It was third behind the 24th Michigan, also an Iron Brigade regiment, as well as the 1st Minnesota in total casualties at Gettysburg. The Michigan regiment lost 397 out of 496 soldiers, an 80% casualty rate. The 1st Minnesota suffered the highest casualty percentage of any Union regiment in a single Civil War engagement during the battle of Gettysburg, losing 216 out of 262 men (82%). Due to the losses the brigade sustained in the Gettysburg campaign the 1st Battalion, New York Volunteer Sharpshooters were attached to the brigade to add some much needed manpower.

In early 1864, the 7th Indiana Infantry Regiment was transferred from the 2nd Brigade to the Iron Brigade. While the rest of the brigade considered the New York Sharpshooters and the 7th Indiana as of the Iron Brigade, they were never considered “in” the brigade, with the veterans considering those “in” the brigade being members of the five regiments that fought together at Gettysburg. The brigade fought in the bloody Overland campaign of 1864, and took part in the siege of Petersburg for the rest of the war. On October 31, 1864, the Iron Brigade and the Keystone Brigade were consolidated until the Pennsylvanians were ordered to Camp Elmira for provost duty.

The 19th Indiana was eventually transferred to the 20th Indiana Infantry Regiment in October, 1864. The 2nd Wisconsin left the brigade once they mustered out in 1864. The 24th Michigan was transferred up north to Camp Butler (Illinois) for guard duty in February, 1865. The 6th Wisconsin and 7th Wisconsin fought together until the end of the war. The 24th Michigan was selected to be the honor guard for the Funeral of Abraham Lincoln in Springfield, Illinois.

In June 1865, the units of the surviving brigade were separated and reassigned to the Army of the Tennessee.

The last surviving member of the Iron Brigade, Josiah E. Cass of Eau Claire, Wisconsin, died on 2 December 1947, from a fractured hip suffered in a fall. He was 100 years old.

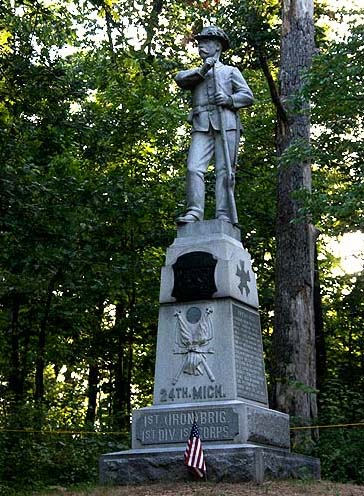
24th Michigan Monument, Gettysburg National Military Park

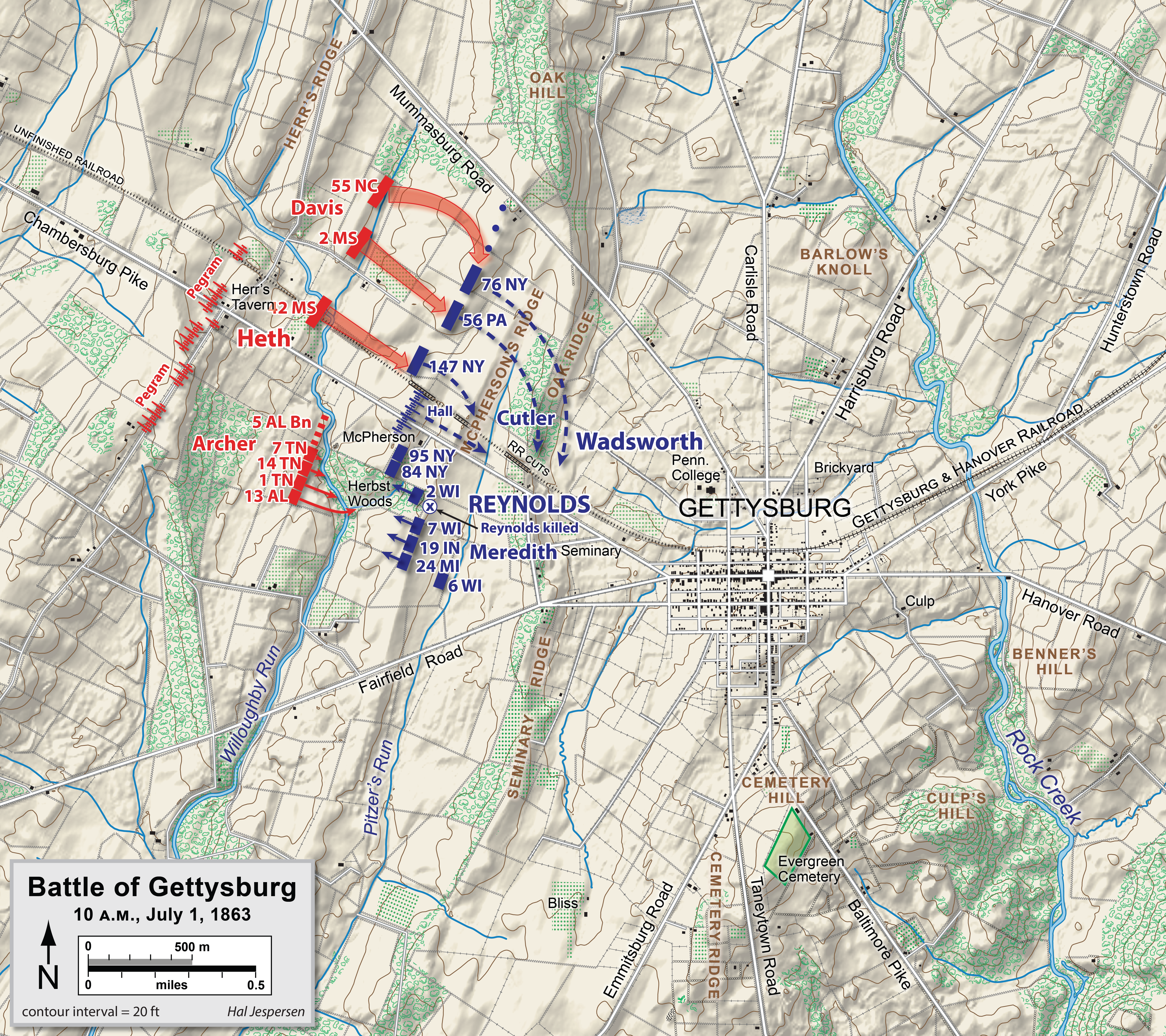
The Iron Brigade prepared for battle, at Gettysburg, by anchoring the Union Army's southern flank, 10:00–10:45 a.m., on Day 1.

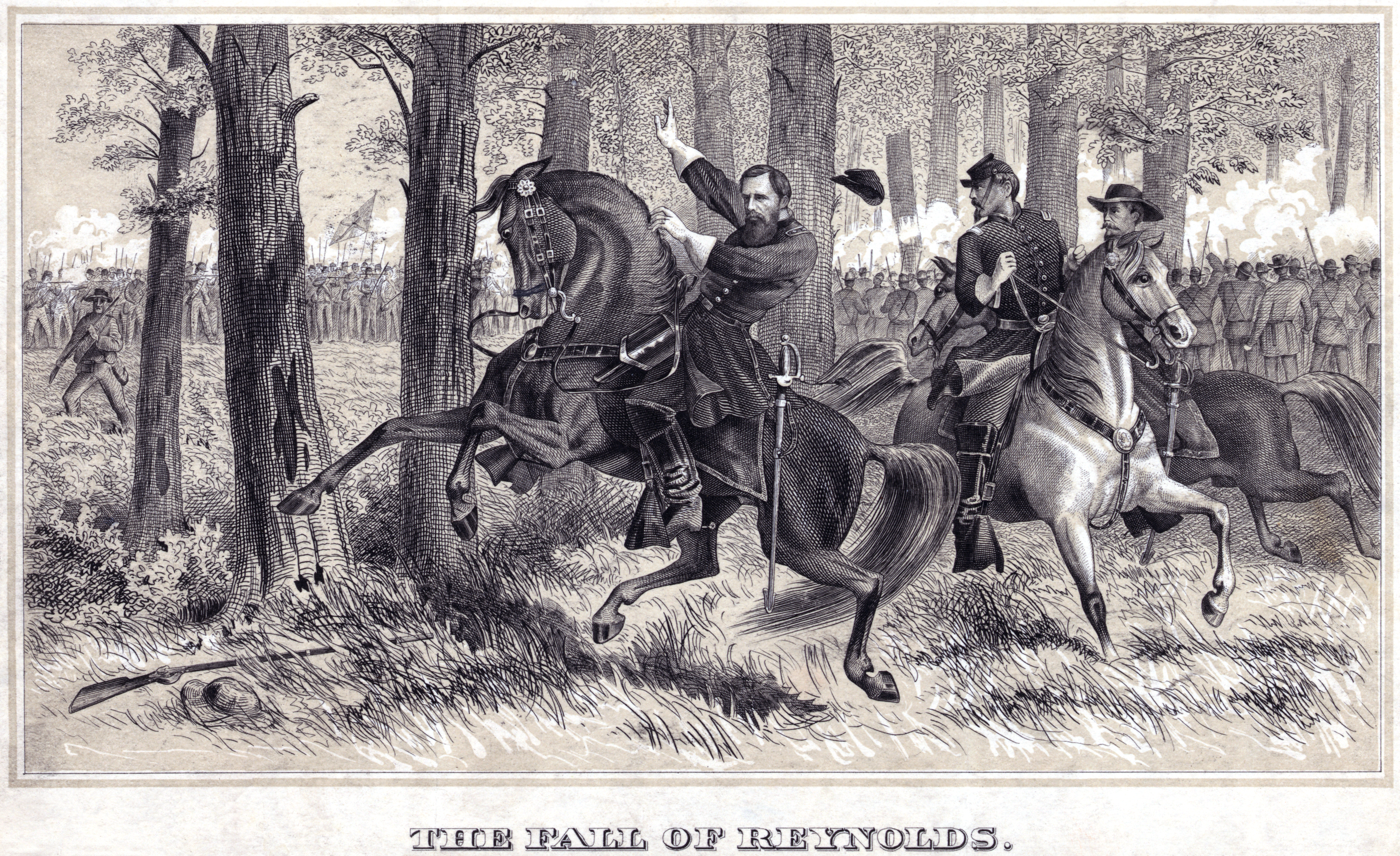
Death of General John F. Reynolds as he supervised the deployment of the Iron Brigade early on the first day of the Battle of Gettysburg

== Commanders ==
The brigade commanders, disregarding temporary assignments, were:

Brig. Gen. Rufus King: September 28, 1861 – May 7, 1862
Brig. Gen. John Gibbon: May 7, 1862 – November 4, 1862
Brig. Gen. Solomon Meredith: November 25, 1862 – July 1, 1863 (wounded at Gettysburg)

The Iron Brigade lost its all-Western status on July 16, 1863, following its crippling losses at Gettysburg, when the 167th Pennsylvania was incorporated into it, and a company of New York sharpshooters. On October 31, 1864, the Keystone Brigade was consolidated with the Iron Brigade as well. The brigade that succeeded it, which included the survivors of the Iron Brigade, was commanded by:

Col. William W. Robinson (of the 7th Wisconsin): July 1, 1863 – March 25, 1864
Brig. Gen. Lysander Cutler (6th Wisconsin): March 25, 1864 – May 6, 1864
Col. William W. Robinson: May 6, 1864 – June 7, 1864
Brig. Gen. Edward S. Bragg (6th Wisconsin): June 7, 1864 – February 10, 1865
Col. John A. Kellogg (6th Wisconsin): February 28, 1865 – April 27, 1865
Col. (BVT BG) Henry A. Morrow (24th Michigan): April 27, 1865 – June 5, 1865

== Uniforms ==
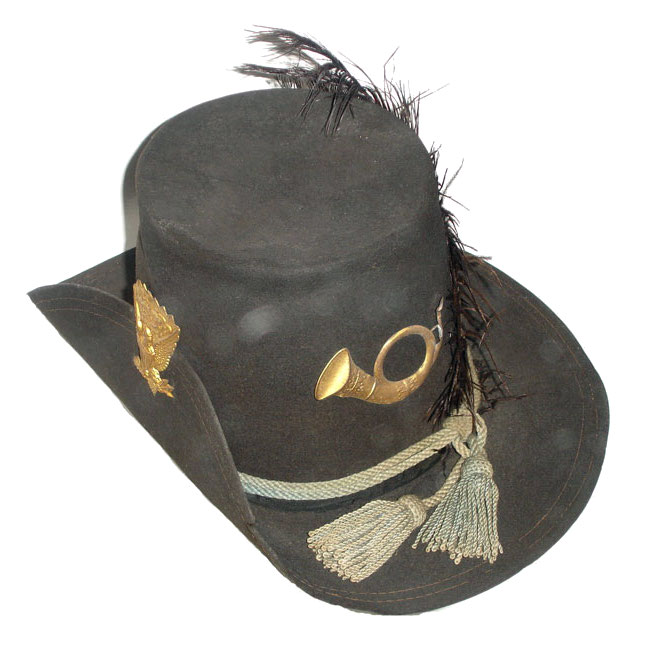
The black wool hardee hat was most famously worn and easily identified as the hat worn by the Union Army's "Iron Brigade of the West", which became their trademark. They were popularly known by the nickname "The Black Hats".

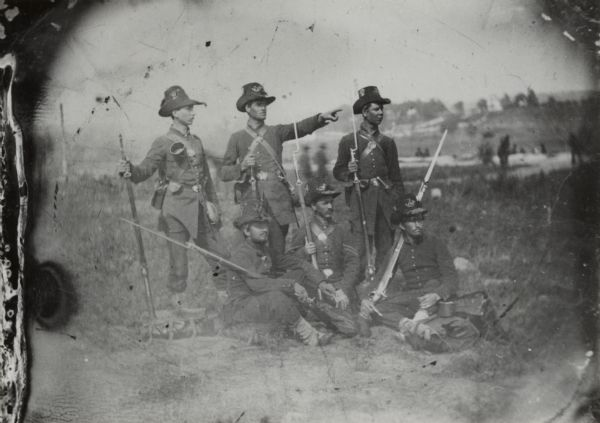
Iron Brigade soldiers wearing their distinctive uniform, which included black Hardee hats, frock coats, and leggings. The soldiers have been identified as possibly part of 2nd Wisconsin Volunteer Infantry Regiment, Company C.

The Iron Brigade was noted for consistently wearing the dress uniform of the US Army. While many Union regiments were issued the dress uniform and wore it from time to time, much of the Iron Brigade wore it on campaign and in combat. It consisted of:

A Hardee black hat: A tall blocked, brimmed black hat, featuring a brass infantry bugle, a red I Corps circle patch and brass numbers/letters of the front to indicate units and companies. A brass eagle badge on the side used to hold the brim up in a slouch, and finally an ostrich feather plume.

Union frock coat: A long, dark blue coat that came down to the mid thighs, resembling that of an officers coat. Fitted with a single breasted row of nine brass buttons, each with the federal eagle on them. The cuffs and collars had light blue trimming and two smaller brass buttons on the cuffs. The inside of the coat was lined with cotton to make a better fit.

Light/dark blue trousers: depending on the period of the war and unit, trousers versed from light, sky blue to a dark blue the same colour as the coat. The trouser extended from the mid waist down to the ankles and had a pocket on either side.

White canvas gaiter: white canvas leggings with leather straps to prevent stones and dirt getting into the shoes whilst in the field.

All other equipment not mentioned included standard field equipment of the Union army consisting of canteens, belts, cartridge box, bayonet and scabbard, haversack and other various items of kit.

== Weapons ==
The Springfield Model 1861 rifled musket, firing the .58 caliber projectile, was issued to the 6th Wisconsin, 19th Indiana, and 24th Michigan regiments. This single-shot, muzzle loading, percussion cap rifle weighed nine pounds with a barrel length of forty inches. It was the most widely issued infantry weapon used by Federal troops. The Second and Seventh Wisconsin used the Lorenz Rifle.

"On the Union side, continental European firearms were mostly distributed to the Western armies--as such, the Lorenz Rifle was relatively uncommon in the Army of the Potomac (although two regiments of the famous Iron Brigade carried them) but heavily used by the Army of the Cumberland and Army of Tennessee.

== Other Iron Brigades ==
Eastern Iron Brigade

Shelby's Iron Brigade

=== Union Army ===
There have been other brigades known by the same name. Another brigade in the Army of the Potomac had previously been known as the Iron Brigade, later the "Iron Brigade of the East" or "First Iron Brigade", to avoid confusion. This unit was the 1st Brigade, 1st Division, I Corps, also known as Merideth's Brigade. It consisted of the 22nd New York, 24th New York, 30th New York, 14th Regiment (New York State Militia), and 2nd U.S. Sharpshooters. Although this Iron Brigade of the East served in the same infantry division as the Iron Brigade of the West, press attention focused primarily on the latter. Most of the Eastern regiments were mustered out before the Battle of Gettysburg, where the remaining Eastern Iron Brigade Regiments and the Iron Brigade of the West arguably achieved their greatest fame.

Recent scholarship identifies two other brigades referred to by their members or others as "The Iron Brigade": 3rd Brigade, 1st Division, III Corps (17th Maine, 3rd Michigan, 5th Michigan, 1st, 37th, and 101st New York) Reno's Brigade from the North Carolina expedition (21st and 35th Massachusetts, 51st Pennsylvania, and 51st New York)

The Horn Brigade, a unit serving in the Western Theater, was known as the "Iron Brigade of the Army of the Cumberland."

=== Confederate Army — Shelby's Iron Brigade ===
Shelby's Iron Brigade was a Confederate cavalry brigade also known as the "Missouri Iron Brigade". The Confederate Iron Brigade was part of the division, commanded by Brig. Gen. Joseph O. "Jo" Shelby, in the Army of Arkansas and fought in Maj. Gen. Sterling Price's Missouri Expedition, in 1864.

=== Modern U.S. Army ===
The 2nd Brigade of the U.S. Army's 1st Armored Division has carried the Iron Brigade moniker since 1985 and was previously called the "Black Hat" Brigade.

The 3d Brigade Combat Team, 1st Infantry Division was known as the Iron Brigade from its formation in 1917 through World War I, World War II and Vietnam, until some time in the early 2000s when, for reasons that are still unclear, the name was changed to Duke Brigade. The unit crest was an Iron Cross in a triangle, it appears that that was also changed.

The 3rd Brigade of the 4th Infantry Division is also known as the Iron Brigade. Its unit crest is similar to the medals issued to veterans of both the Western and the Eastern Iron Brigades of the Army of the Potomac.

The 1st Heavy Brigade Combat Team of the 2d Infantry Division is known as the Iron Brigade as well. Located at Camp Casey, South Korea, the brigade has a critical role of military deterrence on the Korean Peninsula.

The 2nd Brigade of the 3d Armored Division (Spearhead), formerly stationed on Coleman Kaserne in Gelnhausen, Germany.

The 157th Maneuver Enhancement Brigade, also known as the Iron Brigade, is based out of Milwaukee, Wisconsin. It was formerly known as the 57th Field Artillery Brigade, at which time its subordinate organizations included the 1st Battalion, 126th Field Artillery Regiment and the 1st Battalion, 121st Field Artillery Regiment from the Wisconsin Army National Guard, plus the 1st Battalion, 182d Field Artillery Regiment of the Michigan Army National Guard. Not to be confused with the famous "Iron Brigade" of the Civil War, the 57th Field Artillery Brigade is also known as the "Iron Brigade," a nickname traditionally given to crack artillery units in the Civil War. It was during World War I that the 57th Field Artillery Brigade earned its nickname as it spent many hours at the front and fired more artillery rounds than any brigade in the American Army.

The 32d Infantry Division was an infantry division of the United States Army National Guard that fought primarily during World War I and World War II. It was formed with units from the states of Wisconsin and Michigan. With roots as the Iron Brigade in the American Civil War, the division's ancestral units came to be referred to as the Iron Jaw Division. The division was briefly called up during the Berlin Crisis in 1961.

In 1967, the division was deactivated and reconstituted the 32d Infantry Brigade of the Wisconsin Army National Guard. It was reorganized in 2007 as the 32d Infantry Brigade Combat Team. The shoulder sleeve insignia currently worn is a red line shot through with a red arrow, giving them the nickname Red Arrow Brigade, which was earned in World War I where the 32d Division was fighting the Germans alongside the French, who noted the unit's tenacity by punching through the German lines, like an arrow and calling the unit Les Terribles, meaning The Terrors.

=== Sports ===
The name "Iron Brigade" has also been used to describe the offensive line of the University of Wisconsin Badger Football Team. The line is known for its size, strength, and dedication to the protection of the backfield. The Badgers play in Camp Randall Stadium, a site used to train Wisconsin volunteers during the Civil War.
