= Walter Phelps =

Walter P. Phelps Jr.
- Colonel Phelps in 1862.
- Born: October 29, 1832; Hartford, Connecticut
- Died: February 28, 1878 (aged 45); Bennington, Vermont
- Burial place: Green-Wood Cemetery; Brooklyn, New York
- Spouse: Eliza Ann Schenk
- Children: Mary
- Military career
- Allegiance: United States of America; Union
- Branch: United States Army; Union Army
- Service years: 1861–1865
- Rank: Colonel; Bvt. Brigadier General
- Commands: 22nd New York Infantry; Eastern Iron Brigade
- Conflicts: American Civil War
- Other work: lumber merchant, iron manufacturer

Walter P. Phelps Jr. (Oct 29, 1832 – February 20, 1878) was an officer in the Union Army throughout the American Civil War, serving as commanding officer of the Eastern Iron Brigade.

== Biography ==
Phelps was born in on October 29, 1832 Hartford, Connecticut. He later moved to Glens Falls, New York and worked as a lumber merchant.

Phelps raised the 22nd New York Volunteer Infantry Regiment, which mustered in on June 6, 1861 for two-years service, and was appointed colonel of the regiment. Phelps later assumed command of the 1st Brigade, 1st Division, I Corps after General John P. Hatch was transferred.

Colonel Phelps wrote: "In compliance with orders from General Hatch, I assumed command of his brigade Sunday, September 14, [1862] at 10 a.m. The column of General Hooker's corps was then moving through Frederick toward Middletown on the pike."

He was then in command of the First Iron Brigade, which at this time it was known simply as the "Iron Brigade" because the "Iron Brigade of the West" had not gained its acclaim. At the Battle of Antietam however the "Iron Brigade of the East" supported and rescued the other Iron Brigade. Phelps' brigade advanced through the cornfield early on the September 17 in close support of General John Gibbon's Iron Brigade. The 14th Brooklyn under his command helped the 6th Wisconsin Volunteers as a Confederate charge was about to push them back through the cornfield. Phelps' Brigade got the farthest during the action, the 14th Brooklyn being the only regiment to reach Dunkard Church and hold their waiting for reinforcements to arrive.

When the war ended Phelps had been give a brevet promotion to brigadier general on March 13, 1865 before mustering out of the volunteer army. He returned to Glens Falls and became a successful ironmanufacturer.

Phelps died suddenly on February 28, 1878 - a Friday - in Bennington, Vermont. The Troy Times sayd of him:"General Phelps was born in Hartford, Conn, in 1829, and went to Glens Falls soon after he had attained his majority, and engaged in the lumber business. At the breaking out of the war in 1861 he raised the 22d New York volunteers in this vicinity, and went out as colonel in command. He remained in the army until the conclusion of the civil conflict, retiring a brigadier general to which rank he was elevated for meritorious service on the field of battle. He distinguished himself repeatedly in action for bravery and soldiery conduct, and was in nearly all the battles in which the army of the Potomac was engaged. His health was injured during his army life, and for several months after his return home his life was despaired of. He recovered, however, and during the past ten or twelve years he has been successfully engaged in the iron business at Millerton, Dutchess County. General Phelps was a man widely known throughout the country by reason of his business connections, and was universally respected. He was a person of rare scholastic attainments, strong and enduring attachments and great firmness of purpose. He was particularly well known and beloved in this city and vicinity, and many friends will regret his sudden and unexpected demise."

Col. Phelps was buried on Green-Wood Cemetery in Brooklyn.

== See also ==
- Bibliography of the American Civil War
- Bibliography of Abraham Lincoln
- Bibliography of Ulysses S. Grant
- List of American Civil War battles
