= John Porter Hatch =

US Army officer and Medal of Honor recipient (1822–1901)

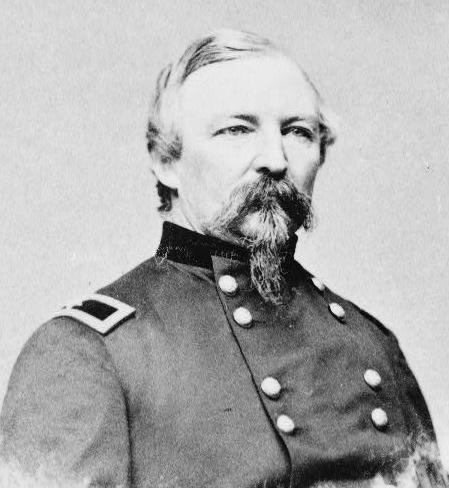
- Born: January 9, 1822; Oswego, New York, U.S.
- Died: April 12, 1901 (aged 79); New York City, U.S.
- Burial place: Arlington National Cemetery
- Military career
- Allegiance: United States of America; Union
- Branch: United States Army; Union Army
- Service years: 1845–1886
- Rank: Brevet Major General (Volunteer Army); Colonel (Regular Army)
- Units: (United States) 3rd U.S. Infantry, 1845–1846 (United States) Regiment of Mounted Riflemen 1845–1860 (United States) Union Army 1861–1865 (United States) 4th U.S. Cavalry, 1864–1881 (United States) 2nd U.S. Cavalry, 1881–1886
- Commands: Cavalry, V Corps; 1st Division, I Corps; 2nd U.S. Cavalry
- Conflicts: Mexican–American War; Battle of Palo Alto; Battle of Resaca de la Palma; Battle of Contreras; Battle of Churubusco; Battle of Chapultepec; American Indian Wars; American Civil War; Jackson's Valley campaign; First Battle of Winchester; Northern Virginia campaign; Second Battle of Bull Run; Battle of Chantilly; Maryland campaign; Battle of South Mountain; Sherman's March to the Sea; Battle of Honey Hill; Battle of Tulifinny
- Awards: Medal of Honor

John Porter Hatch (January 9, 1822 – April 12, 1901) was a career American soldier who served as general in the Union Army during the American Civil War. He received a Medal of Honor for gallantry in action at the September 1862 Battle of South Mountain during the Maryland Campaign.

== Early life and career ==
Hatch was born in Oswego, N. Y., a son of Moses Porter and Hannah (Reed) Hatch. He graduated from the United States Military Academy in 1845, ranking 17th in his class. He experienced his first active field service as a second lieutenant in the 3rd U.S. Infantry during the Mexican War. In May 1846, he served under General Zachary Taylor at Palo Alto and Resaca de la Palma. He was transferred later to serve under Winfield Scott in the Mounted Rifles. He was brevetted as a first lieutenant for gallant service in the subsequent battles of Contreras and Churubusco, and captain for bravery at Chapultepec. When the war ended, Hatch was assigned to various posts on the frontier of the Old West, as well as in Oregon. He married Adelaide Goldsmith Burckle in 1851; the couple raised two children. In the next decade, Hatch participated in several expeditions against Native American tribes. He was promoted to the full rank of captain in October 1860 and served as the Chief of Commissary for the army's Department of New Mexico.

== Civil War ==
Hatch was awarded the Army Medal of Honor for gallantry for his actions in the attack on Turner's Gap. His citation reads: "Was severely wounded while leading one of his brigades in the attack under a heavy fire from the enemy."

Following the outbreak of the Civil War, Hatch was ordered to the East and assigned to the cavalry of George B. McClellan. He was made a brigadier general of volunteers on September 28, 1861. In December, he was assigned command of a brigade of cavalry stationed at Annapolis, Maryland, serving under General Rufus King. Hatch's brigade made a series of daring raids on enemy positions near the Rapidan and Rappahannock rivers. These raids gained his brigade the Nickname Iron Brigade, which followed that brigade up until January 1863, long after Hatch had moved on.

In March 1862, Hatch assumed command of the cavalry of the V Corps under Major General Nathaniel P. Banks. He served in the Valley Campaign and fought at the First Battle of Winchester. In August of that year, after incurring the wrath of army commander John Pope for two failed cavalry raids, he was reassigned to the infantry. He commanded a brigade in the I Corps, assuming division command after Brig. Gen Rufus King fell ill with epilepsy the evening before Second Bull Run. Hatch led the division there and at the Battle of South Mountain, where he got shot in the leg. He was brevetted as a major general of volunteers and subsequently received the Medal of Honor for his gallantry under severe enemy fire.

Hatch was disabled until February 1863, when he returned to light administrative duties, serving as a judge on courts-martial and commanding the draft rendezvous at Philadelphia in July. He then commanded the cavalry depot at St. Louis during the late summer and early autumn. On October 27, 1863, he was promoted to the Regular Army rank of major of the 4th U.S. Cavalry.

In 1864, he was assigned to the Department of the South, where he had charge of the coast division. He was in charge of operations on John's Island, South Carolina, in July and led the Federal forces at the Battle of Honey Hill in November. He subsequently operated in cooperation with Major General William T. Sherman in the Georgia-Carolinas Campaign and took part in the attack on Charleston. Following the city's surrender, Hatch assumed military command of it from February to August 1865.

In the omnibus promotions following the war, he was brevetted from March 1865 both as a major general of volunteers dating and as a colonel in the Regular Army.

== Postbellum career ==
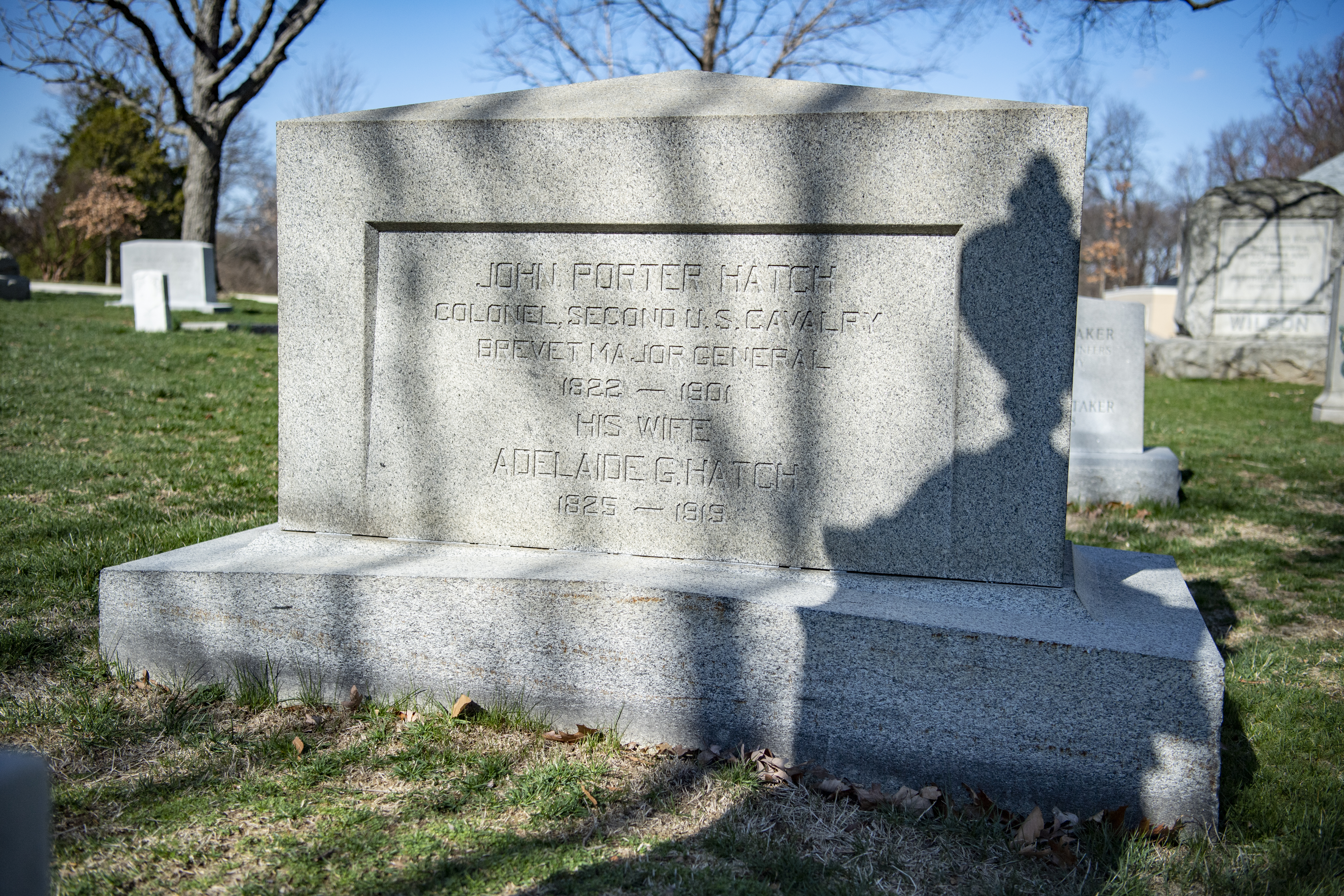
Grave at Arlington National Cemetery

Hatch stayed in the regular Army following the war, reverting to his regular rank of major. For the next twenty-six years, he again served on the frontier.

Hatch was an officer too at Fort Concho in San Angelo, Texas, Indian Territory, Montana Territory, and finally in Washington Territory.

He retired on January 9, 1886, and moved to New York City. He received the Medal of Honor in 1893 in recognition for his service at South Mountain. Hatch was President of the Aztec Club of 1847 of New York and a member of the Oswego County Historical Society. He was also a member of the Military Order of the Loyal Legion of the United States.

John P. Hatch died in New York City in the spring of 1901. He was buried at Arlington National Cemetery, Arlington, Virginia. He was survived by his wife, Adelaide Burckle Hatch (1825–1919) and their children, Miss Harriet Hatch (1854–1929) and Mark Burckle Hatch (1856–1914).

== See also ==
- List of American Civil War Medal of Honor recipients: G–L
- List of American Civil War generals (Union)
- Battle of South Mountain
- Second Battle of Bull Run
