= Eastern Iron Brigade =

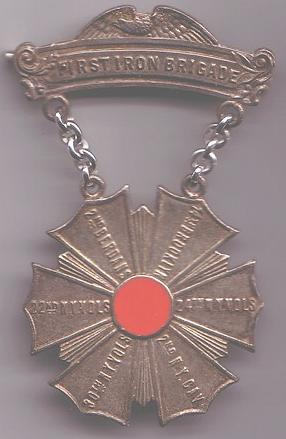
- The "Eastern Iron Brigade" also, known later as the "Iron Brigade of the East", to distinguish the unit, from the more, well known "Iron Brigade of the West" was a brigade of infantry, that served in the Union Army's Army of the Potomac, during the American Civil War. Shown is a Veteran's Medal, for the Eastern Iron Brigade, which had a red circle, in the middle, to symbolize the Brigade's regiments connection, to the 1st Division, I Corps, of the Army of the Potomac and that they were the "First Iron Brigade", to be formed, at the beginning of the War.
- Active: 1861-1863
- Country: United States
- Allegiance: United States
- Branch: (United States) Union Army Army of the Potomac U.S. Volunteers
- Type: infantry
- Size: Five regiments: 22nd New York Volunteer Infantry Regiment 24th New York Volunteer Infantry Regiment 30th New York Volunteer Infantry Regiment 14th Regiment New York State Militia (14th Brooklyn Chasseurs) 2nd United States Volunteer Sharpshooter Regiment
- Nicknames: Iron Brigade of the East, First Iron Brigade
- Engagements: American Civil War: Northern Virginia Campaign; Second Battle of Bull Run; Battle of South Mountain

Commanders
- Notable commanders: General John P. Hatch General Walter Phelps Jr. Brig. Gen. Christopher C. Augur

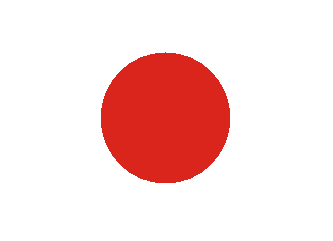
The "Iron Brigade of the East", was a part of the Union Army, Army of the Potomac's 1st Division, I Corps, shown as a red circle emblem on the Corps' flag, looking very similar to, the red sun, on the modern flag of Japan.

The Eastern Iron Brigade, also known as the Iron Brigade of the East and First Iron Brigade, was a brigade of infantry, that served in the Union Army's Army of the Potomac, during the American Civil War. For much of its service, it was designated as the 1st Brigade, 1st Division, I Corps. Among its commanding officers were General John P. Hatch and General Walter Phelps Jr. Noted for its reliability in battle, the brigade developed a reputation which remained after it was disbanded late in the war, due to its annihilation from extremely high casualties.

== Origin of Eastern Iron Brigade ==
The Eastern Iron Brigade consisted of the 22nd New York, 24th New York, 30th New York, 14th Regiment (New York State Militia), and 2nd U.S. Sharpshooters. During the Fredericksburg Expeditions the brigade had two cavalry regiments attached to it, the 2nd New York Cavalry Regiment ("Harris Light") under the command of Lt. Col. Judson Kilpatrick (originally of 5th New York Zouaves) and the 6th New York Cavalry. The pair of cavalry regiments were later sent back to their normal divisions.

The veteran brigade, under Col. Walter Phelps, received its nickname when Brig. Gen. Christopher C. Augur began a campaign near and around Fredericksburg, Virginia. Following a march from Catlett's Station to Falmouth Va. on April 15, 1862, Brig. Gen. Marsena R. Patrick commented to Augur: "Your men must be made of iron to make such marches." The men of the 1st Brigade adopted this well-received nickname. From then on they were known as the "Iron Brigade," and then later as the "Eastern Iron Brigade." The former name was afterward applied to a second Brigade in the same division. Colonel William Freeman Fox in his Regimental losses in the American Civil War, 1861-1865 said, "It seems strange that two brigades in the same division should adopt like synonyms, but in justice to Hatch's Brigade, it should be stated that it was the original Iron Brigade."

The first Iron Brigade, to which the Fourteenth belonged, lost more soldiers through death or injury in one battle (the Second Manassas) than the British Light Brigade did at the Battle of Balaklava, which was immortalized in the famous Tennyson poem.

The men of the Iron Brigade became so enamored with their "Iron" moniker, that some of the regiments had Iron Brigade placed on their flags, which they carried into battle. The news article below describes an exhibition showing off the battle standard carried by the 24th during the war and in 1865 the flag was displayed proudly after the regiment had been mustered out of service:

The veterans of the old Twenty-Fourth, (first Oswego County) regiment will be pleased to learn that the Flag which they so gallantly followed and so nobly sustained on so many bloody fields, is on exhibition, at the New York Sanitary Fair, in the department of "Flags, Trophies and Relics"—a mute but eloquent witness of their bravery and patriotism. It was deposited by Col. S. R. BEARDSLEY, and bears upon one side the inscription: "24th Regiment, Iron Brigade, 1st Division, 1st Army Corps."

== Battle of South Mountain ==
The Iron Brigade was heavily engaged, at the Battle of South Mountain and had just been taken command of by Colonel Walter Phelps Jr of the 22nd New York Volunteer Infantry Regiment the day of South Mountain. The Iron Brigade received orders to make their advance up the mountain around 4 pm to support General Patrick's brigade in assaulting the confederate positions atop the hill. They were sent in as skirmishers to assist Colonel Patrick's men and then were posted behind a fence awaiting the command to move forward.

Colonel Phelps now ordered his men to advance, and General Hatch rode through the lines, pressing them forward. They went in with a cheer, poured in a deadly fire, and drove the enemy from his position behind the fence, after a short and desperate conflict, and took post some yards beyond.

According to later accounts by Colonel Phelps, the brigade was ordered to move up the mountain and force the confederates away from a fence and take their position:

Too much praise cannot be awarded to the officers and men of this brigade for their noble conduct on this occasion. Although the enemy were strongly posted behind a fence, and apparently in larger force than our own troops, they could not withstand the terrific fire and steady veteran advance of my line. The conflict at the fence became desperate, many of the enemy at this time being less than 8 rods in our front, but the undaunted bravery of officers and men enabled me to drive them from their position and capture a number of prisoners. The loss of the brigade at this point was much heavier than at any other on the field.

Having succeeded in forcing the enemy from their position, I advanced my line about 5 rods, where I obtained partial shelter for my men from an abrupt rise of ground. Perceiving that the right of my line extended beyond the enemy's left, I ordered Fourteenth Brooklyn to advance their right, which being done enabled them to enfilade the enemy's ranks with a fire which did great execution. This brigade held its position until relieved by Doubleday's brigade.

The brigade was noted again for its performance at the battle of South Mountain, as noted by Phelps:

I cannot allow the conduct of Lieutenant Cranford, Fourteenth New York State Militia, and Lieutenant Schenck, Twenty-second New York Volunteers, aides to myself, to pass unnoticed. I was often obliged to send them, through a galling fire, to different parts of the field with orders. Their conduct on this occasion was most gallant, and all that I could have desired. It was the more striking that their line of duty did not require their presence on the field at that time, the former being acting commissary of subsistence, and the latter regimental quartermaster. Captain Monroe, Battery D, First Rhode Island Artillery, attached to this brigade, now acting chief of division artillery, will forward, at the earliest possible moment, a consolidated report of the casualties in the batteries in the engagements of September 14, 16, and 17.

The brigade took about 25 percent losses, at South Mountain, out of 400 officers and enlisted Men their casualties were enlisted men killed, 20; commissioned officers wounded, 4; enlisted men wounded, 63; missing, 8. Total, 95.

== After Fredericksburg ==
After the successful campaign, the brigade mostly did skirmishes and reconnaissance work for the Army of the Potomac. Before the July 1863 Battle of Gettysburg, the original 1st Brigade, 1st Division, I Corps was disbanded, and all of its regiments were transferred to other brigades or mustered out. Sgt. Major James Mero Matthews of the 2nd USSS wrote in his Journal the day they were transferred out of the First Iron Brigade:

(December 30, 1862) Orders Came Late last night to join Berdan's 1st Regiment. So this morning after taking leave of the Brigade and Colonel Phelps, we left this Old Iron Brigade. Colonel Phelps made a short heartfelt speech and then the brigade stacked arms and took leave of us by shaking hands.

At that time the brigade, under Brig. Gen. Solomon Meredith, which had received considerable press attention as the Iron Brigade since the September 1862 Battle of South Mountain (then under Brig. Gen. John Gibbon), was redesignated 1st Brigade, 1st Division, I Corps. Disputes between the veterans of the two brigades increased in frequency and bitterness. Regiments like the 14th Brooklyn kept up the fight and always reminded their 2nd Iron Brigade Counterparts that the 14th Brooklyn was in fact a member of the First Iron Brigade. The men of the 14th Brooklyn never referred to the First Iron Brigade as the Eastern Iron Brigade because they felt as though they were in fact the first, original Iron Brigade of the East, and were the first and truly original Iron Brigade.

== Weapons ==
Ordnance returns for the regiment around the time of Fredericksburg show it had a mixture of "Springfield Rifled Muskets, model 1855, 1861, N.A. and contract. Calibre .58" (Approx 183) and 1853 Enfield Rifled Muskets. Calibre .58 and .577 (Approx 217). During the Battle of Chancellorsville the unit returns only list the "Springfield Rifled Muskets, model 1855, 1861, N.A. and contract. Calibre .58" (Approx 440). The Returns for the beginning of the Overland campaign also show the "Springfield Rifled Muskets, model 1855, 1861, N.A. and contract. Calibre .58" to the approximate amount of 432 and 1 single Enfield pattern gun.

== Historical traces of First Iron Brigade ==
Since the American Civil War, much has been forgotten, and the First Iron Brigade was almost lost to past memories. Between 1998 and 2008 much evidence, records and accounts of the actual First Iron Brigade has surfaced. Below are some accounts taken from records and reports from the war itself.

The following statement:

In June the regiment became a part of the 1st brigade, 1st division, 3d corps, Army of Virginia, and in Sept., 1862, the same brigade and division, was made part of the 1st corps, Army of the Potomac. This brigade was known as the Iron Brigade before the Iron Brigade of the West was formed.

Below is the poem written by Captain Austin W Holden of the 24th New York State Infantry:

"The Old Iron Brigade"
From the camp and its now peaceful revels,
The bugles will soon call us forth,
The "Thirtieth" and "Red Legged Devils",
"Twenty-second" and the brave "Twenty-fourth."
To terror each heart is a stranger,
Tis cowards alone are afraid,
Then on to the front line of danger,
With the gallant old "Iron Brigade."

A report from William Fox of the 107th NY states that:

The brigade that was composed of the 22nd New York, 24th New York, 30th New York, 14th Regiment [New York State Militia], and 2nd U.S. Sharpshooters was the first to be called the 'Iron Brigade' because of its brave fighting at South Mountain and Antietam

From the New York Herald, June 2, 1863:

The old 'Iron Brigade' is no more. One by one its regiments have passed through Washington to their homes... The Twenty-fourth and Thirtieth left several days since and their departure and reception at home have already been chronicled. The Twenty-second passed through Washington last night and the Fourteenth remains alone...

Letter From Captain Levi Beardsley upon the 24th New York's Mustering out of Company I:

In common with the gallant "24th," you have earned distinction, and are well worthy the title of "braves of the Iron Brigade." You cheerfully offered your lives upon the altar of our country, and have been consecrated in the blood of fallen comrades. You have gained a name and a reputation of incalculable value, and should be enshrined in the memory of a grateful commonwealth.

== Other Union Army and U.S. Army Iron Brigades ==
There were and are other Iron Brigades, known to some extent, by the same moniker:

- Another brigade, in the Army of the Potomac, was from three western states and later named the Iron Brigade, famously known as the "Iron Brigade of the West". This brigade, composed primarily of units from Indiana, Wisconsin, and Michigan was also known as "The Black Hats" and "Black Hat Brigade".
- Scholarship identifies two other brigades referred to by their members or others as "The Iron Brigade":
  - 3rd Brigade, 1st Division, III Corps (17th Maine, 3rd Michigan, 5th Michigan, 1st, 37th, and 101st New York)
  - Reno's Brigade from the North Carolina expedition (21st and 35th Massachusetts, 51st Pennsylvania, and 51st New York)
- The current Second Brigade, of the U.S. Army's First Armored Division has been known as the "Iron Brigade" since 1985.
- The current U.S. Army Third Brigade, of the Fourth Infantry Division, is also known as the "Iron Brigade".

== Confederate Army – Shelby's Iron Brigade ==
Shelby's Iron Brigade was a Confederate cavalry brigade also known as the "Missouri Iron Brigade". The Confederate Iron Brigade was part of the division, commanded by Brig. Gen. Joseph O. "Jo" Shelby, in the Army of Arkansas and fought in Maj. Gen. Sterling Price's Missouri Expedition, in 1864.
