= Levi Clark Bootes =

US Army officer (1809–1896)

- Born: December 8, 1809; Washington, D.C., US
- Died: April 19, 1896 (aged 86); Wilmington, Delaware, US
- Military career
- Allegiance: United States
- Branch: United States Army
- Service years: 1846 - 1874
- Rank: Lieutenant Colonel
- Units: Regiment of Mounted Riflemen; 6th U.S. Infantry; 17th U.S. Infantry; 16th U.S. Infantry; 20th U.S. Infantry
- Commands: 25th U.S. Infantry
- Conflicts: Mexican–American War; American Civil War

Levi Clark Bootes (December 8, 1809 – April 19, 1896) was a career officer in the United States Army, serving in the Mexican–American War and the American Civil War.

== Biography ==
Bootes was born in Washington, D.C., and educated in the local schools. He joined the U.S. Army as a private in Company F of the Regiment of Mounted Riflemen on June 19, 1846, and was soon promoted to Sergeant. On June 28, 1848, he was brevetted as a second lieutenant in the 6th U.S. Infantry and served in the Mexican–American War under Generals Zachary Taylor and Winfield Scott. In September 1848, he was promoted to the full rank of second lieutenant. Following the war, Bootes served on various western outposts, and was promoted to first lieutenant on June 9, 1853. He was assigned to the Arizona Territory, serving at Fort Yuma, where in June 1860, he was again promoted, this time to captain.

With the outbreak of the Civil War, Bootes served in the Regular Army with the combined 1st and 6th U.S. Infantry and was wounded at Antietam and again at Gettysburg, where he led his regiment in fighting near the Wheatfield. For his gallantry and leadership, he was promoted to Major (United States) of the 17th U.S. Infantry in October 1863, a position he held through the remainder of the war.

During the Civil War, he received three citations and brevet promotions: Brevetted Major July 1, 1862, for gallant and meritorious service in the Battle of Malvern Hill; Brevetted lieutenant colonel on December 13, 1862, for the Battle of Fredericksburg, and Colonel July 2, 1863, for the Battle of Gettysburg.

Following the war, he transferred to the 16th U.S. Infantry in September 1866, serving in that regiment until 1869. On December 15, 1870, he was briefly assigned to the 20th U.S. Infantry. Shortly thereafter, on January 1, 1871, he received his final assignment, serving as lieutenant colonel of the 25th U.S. Infantry until his retirement from active service in October 1874.

Bootes died in Wilmington, Delaware, at the age of 87.
