= 31st New York Infantry Regiment =

- Active: May 14, 1861, to June 4, 1863
- Country: United States
- Allegiance: Union
- Branch: Infantry
- Engagements: American Civil War: First Battle of Bull Run; Peninsular Campaign; Battle of Antietam; Chancellorsville Campaign

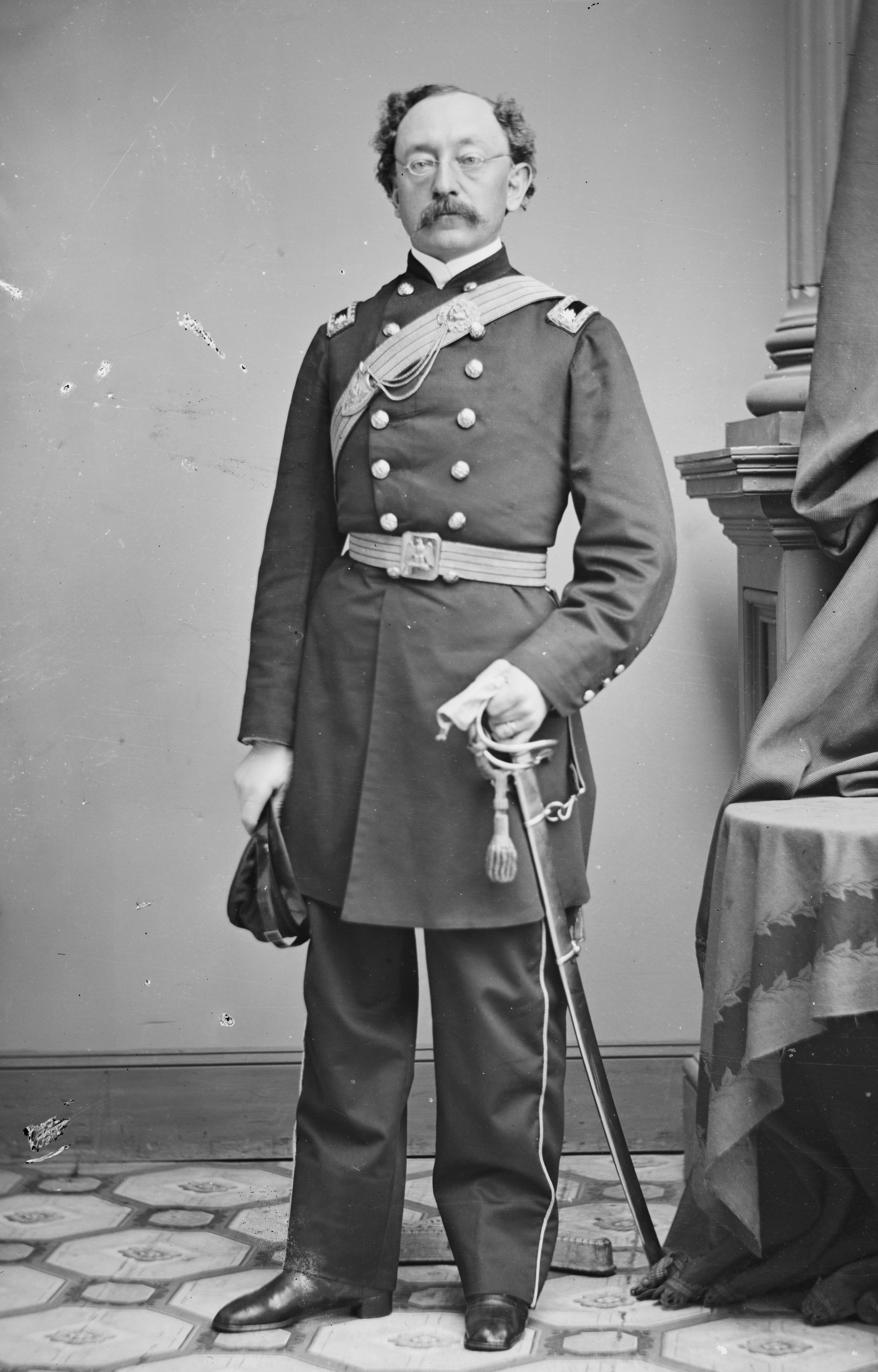
Maj. Alexander Basezemwski, 31st New York Volunteer Infantry

The 31st New York Infantry Regiment, "Baxter's Light Guard" or the "Montezuma Regiment", was an infantry regiment that served in the Union Army during the American Civil War.

== Service ==
The regiment was organized in New York City, New York, and was mustered in for a two-year enlistment on May 14, 1861.

The regiment was mustered out of service on June 4, 1863, and those men who had signed three year enlistments or who re-enlisted were transferred to the 121st New York on April 19, 1864.

== Total strength and casualties ==
The regiment suffered 6 officers and 62 enlisted men who were killed in action or mortally wounded and 3 officers and 1 officer and 29 enlisted men who died of disease, for a total of 98 fatalities.

== Commanders ==
- Colonel Calvin Edward Pratt
- Colonel Roderick Nicol Matheson Led the Regiment at Crampton's Gap, until mortally wounded there.
- Major George Frank Lemon Also led the Regiment at Crampton's Gap, until Mortally wounded There.
- Lieutenant Colonel Francis Effingham Pinto Led the 31st NY and 32nd NY at Antietam.

== See also ==
- List of New York Civil War regiments
