= 2nd Company Massachusetts Sharpshooters =

- Active: September 3, 1861 – October 16, 1864
- Country: United States
- Branch: Union Army
- Type: Sharpshooter
- Size: Company
- Part of: In 1863: 2nd Brigade (Tilton's), 1st Division (Barnes's), V Corps, Army of the Potomac
- Nickname: Andrew's Sharpshooters

Commanders
- Captain: Lewis E. Wentworth

Insignia
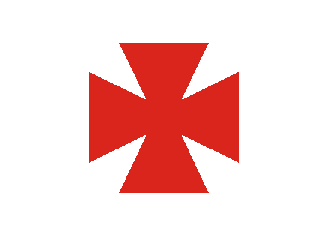
- V Corps (1st Division) badge

The 2nd Company Massachusetts Sharpshooters was a company of sharpshooters that served in the Union Army during the American Civil War. It was also known as the 2nd Andrew's Sharpshooters after the governor of Massachusetts, John Albion Andrew. The company was attached to the 22nd Massachusetts Infantry at the beginning of their term and operated together with that unit for its entire history of service. The 2nd Massachusetts Sharpshooters became part of the Army of the Potomac and saw combat in some of the largest battles of the war.

== See also ==
- Massachusetts in the Civil War
- List of Massachusetts Civil War units
