= 2nd United States Sharpshooters =

Union unit of marksmen during the US Civil War

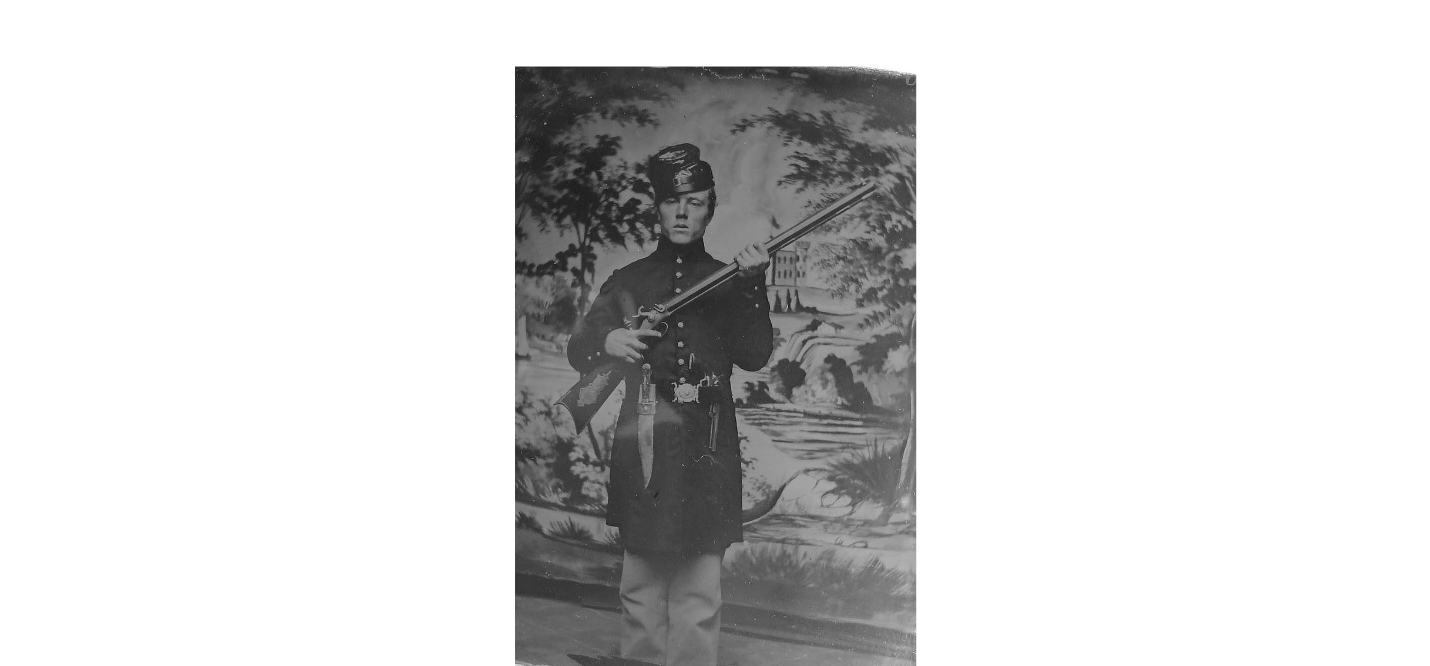
- Unidentified soldier of the 2nd United States Sharpshooters in Union uniform with sniper's target rifle, bowie knife, and Colt '49 pocket revolver
- Active: September 1861 to December 31, 1864
- Country: United States (Union)
- Branch: Infantry
- Equipment: Sharps Rifle
- Engagements: Peninsular Campaign; Second Battle of Bull Run; Battle of Antietam; Battle of Fredericksburg; Battle of Chancellorsville; Battle of Gettysburg; Battle of the Wilderness; Battle of Spotsylvania Court House; Battle of Cold Harbor; Siege of Petersburg

The 2nd United States Sharpshooters was a sharpshooter regiment that served in the Union Army during the American Civil War. From 1861 to January 1863 they were members of the "First Iron Brigade" also known as the "Iron Brigade of the East".

== Service ==
The 2nd U.S. Sharpshooters was raised as follows:

- Company "A" in Minnesota on October 5, 1861.
- Company "B" in Michigan on October 4, 1861.
- Company "C" in Pennsylvania on October 4, 1861
- Company "D" in Maine on November 2, 1861.
- Company "E" in Vermont on November 9, 1861.
- Company "F" in New Hampshire on November 28, 1861.
- Company "G" in New Hampshire on December 10, 1861.
- Company "H" in Vermont on December 31, 1861.

The 2nd and the 1st United States Volunteer Sharpshooter Regiment were consolidated on December 31, 1864, and the regiment was broken up on February 20, 1865, and the remaining companies distributed as follows:

- Company "A" transferred to the 1st Minnesota Volunteer Infantry Regiment.
- Company "B" transferred to the 5th Michigan Volunteer Infantry Regiment.
- Company "C" transferred to the 105th Pennsylvania Volunteer Infantry Regiment.
- Company "D" transferred to the 17th Maine Volunteer Infantry Regiment.
- Company "F" transferred to the 5th New Hampshire Volunteer Infantry.
- Company "G" transferred to the 5th New Hampshire Volunteer Infantry.
- Company "H" transferred to the 4th Vermont Volunteer Infantry Regiment.

== Total strength and casualties ==
The regiment suffered 8 officers and 117 enlisted men who were killed in action or mortally wounded and 2 officers and 123 enlisted men who died of disease, for a total of 250 fatalities.

== Commanders ==
- Colonel Hiram Berdan in 1861
- Colonel Henry A.V. Post from January 1, 1862, to November 16, 1862
- Colonel Hiram Berdan from November 16, 1862, until 1864
- Colonel Homer R. Stoughton Jan 19, 1864.

== See also ==
- List of United States Volunteer Civil War Units
- 1st United States Volunteer Sharpshooter Regiment
- Western Sharpshooters Regiment
- 1st Regiment Michigan Volunteer Sharpshooters
- 1st Pennsylvania Rifles, aka the 13th Pennsylvania Reserve Regiment
- 1st Company Massachusetts Sharpshooters
- 2nd Company Massachusetts Sharpshooters
