= 30th New York Infantry Regiment =

- Active: June 1, 1861 – June 18, 1863
- Country: United States
- Allegiance: Union
- Branch: Infantry
- Engagements: Second Bull Run; South Mountain; Antietam; Fredericksburg; Chancellorsville

The 30th New York Infantry Regiment, officially the 30th Regiment New York Volunteer Infantry, was an infantry regiment in the Union Army during the American Civil War. Organized in Troy, New York, it mustered into service on June 1, 1861, and was mustered out on June 18, 1863. The regiment served in the Army of the Potomac and was part of the famed Eastern Iron Brigade.

== Organization and service ==
The 30th New York was formed primarily from Rensselaer County and surrounding areas, under the leadership of Colonel Edward Frisby, a former brigadier general of the New York State Militia. The regiment trained at Camp Seward near Troy before departing for Washington, D.C. in early July 1861.

The regiment saw action in several significant campaigns. It participated in the Second Battle of Bull Run, where Colonel Frisby was killed in action. The unit then took part in the Maryland Campaign, fighting at South Mountain and Antietam, followed by winter operations and further action at Fredericksburg and Chancellorsville.

After its two-year enlistment expired in June 1863, men with longer enlistments were transferred to the 76th New York Infantry. The regiment was formally mustered out on June 18, 1863.

== Total strength and casualties ==
The regiment enrolled approximately 1,154 men during its service. It suffered the following losses:

- Killed or mortally wounded: 6 officers and 72 enlisted men
- Died of disease: 3 officers and 31 enlisted men
- Total fatalities: 111

Additionally, 231 men were wounded in combat.

== Commanders ==
- Colonel Edward Frisby: A veteran of the New York State Militia, Frisby was appointed colonel of the 30th New York in 1861. He was killed at the Second Battle of Bull Run on August 30, 1862. He is buried in Albany Rural Cemetery.
- Colonel William M. Searing: Searing took command following Frisby’s death and served until the regiment’s mustering out in 1863.

== Diaries and personal accounts ==
Two enlisted men from the 30th New York are known to have kept wartime diaries:

- John G. Morrison: An Irish immigrant from Lansingburgh, New York, Morrison enlisted in the 30th New York Infantry in April 1861. He later served as a coxswain in the U.S. Navy and received the Medal of Honor for his actions during an engagement on the Yazoo River in 1862..
- James Reed: Also from Lansingburgh, Reed's diary entries, spanning from August 11, 1862, to July 24, 1865, have been transcribed by his great-granddaughter, Ann Townsend.

== Legacy ==
The regimental colors carried by the 30th New York at Second Bull Run are preserved by the New York State Military Museum.

Governor Horatio Seymour praised the regiment upon its return in 1863, stating that the flag "will be deposited among the treasured war trophies of the State – there to remain as a monument to patriotism, endurance, and heroism of the Thirtieth regiment."

== See also ==
- List of New York Civil War regiments
- Eastern Iron Brigade
