= 24th New York Infantry Regiment =

- Flag of New York
- Active: May 17, 1861 – May 29, 1863
- Disbanded: May 29, 1863
- Country: United States
- Allegiance: Union
- Branch: Infantry
- Type: Volunteer Infantry
- Size: Regiment
- Garrison/HQ: Elmira, New York
- Engagements: Second Battle of Bull Run; Battle of South Mountain; Battle of Antietam; Battle of Fredericksburg; Battle of Chancellorsville

Commanders
- Notable commanders: Colonel Timothy Sullivan; Colonel Samuel R. Beardsley

The 24th New York Infantry Regiment, also known as the Oswego County Regiment, was an infantry regiment in the Union Army during the American Civil War. Organized in Elmira, New York, the regiment was mustered into service on May 17, 1861, for a two-year enlistment and was mustered out on May 29, 1863. It was part of the famed Eastern Iron Brigade within the Army of the Potomac.

== Service History ==
The 24th New York Infantry Regiment was organized at Elmira, New York, and mustered into service on May 17, 1861, under the command of Colonel Timothy Sullivan. The regiment was primarily recruited from Oswego County and surrounding areas, reflecting a strong local identity.

After initial training in Elmira and guarding railroad lines near Baltimore, the regiment departed for Washington, D.C., in July 1861, where it was attached to the brigade of Brigadier General Erasmus Keyes.

In 1862 the regiment was part of the Army of Virginia, joining the First Brigade of the First Division, and saw its first major combat during the Northern Virginia Campaign. At the Second Battle of Bull Run, the 24th New York engaged in heavy fighting, suffering considerable casualties while holding defensive positions.

Following this, the 24th participated in the Maryland Campaign, including the Battle of South Mountain on September 14, 1862. Here, the regiment played a crucial role in the assault on the mountain passes, helping to drive Confederate forces from key defensive positions.

The regiment then fought at the Battle of Antietam on September 17, 1862, the bloodiest single day in American military history. The 24th New York was engaged in the fierce fighting around the Cornfield and the East Woods, sustaining heavy casualties but contributing to the Union's tactical stalemate that forced Confederate withdrawal.

In December 1862, the 24th participated in the Battle of Fredericksburg, holding lines under withering Confederate fire. Though the Union army suffered a defeat, the regiment demonstrated tenacity and discipline under fire.

In the spring of 1863, the 24th took part in the Chancellorsville Campaign. The regiment was positioned on the Union right flank during the battle in early May, where it endured artillery bombardment and skirmishing as Confederate forces maneuvered.

The regiment's two-year enlistment expired shortly after Chancellorsville, and it was mustered out of service on May 29, 1863. Soldiers who had enlisted for three years were transferred to the 76th New York Infantry Regiment.

== Casualties ==
Throughout its service, the 24th New York Infantry Regiment suffered significant losses:

- Killed in action: 5 officers and 63 enlisted men
- Died of wounds received in action: 1 officer and 22 enlisted men
- Died of disease and other causes: 1 officer and 30 enlisted men
- Total fatalities: 7 officers and 115 enlisted men, aggregating to 122 deaths
- Additionally, 2 enlisted men died while in the hands of the enemy.

== Commanders ==
- Colonel Timothy Sullivan: Initial commander of the regiment; later assumed brigade command.
- Colonel Samuel R. Beardsley: Succeeded Sullivan and led the regiment until its muster-out.

== See also ==
- List of New York Civil War regiments
- Eastern Iron Brigade
