= Baquet =

Baquet may refer to:

== People ==
- Achille Baquet, (1885–c.1956) American jazz clarinetist
- Camille Baquet, (1842–1924) American civil-war officer
- Charles R. Baquet, III (born 1941), American Career Foreign Service Officer
- Danielle Baquet-Long (1982–2009), American musician
- Dean Baquet (born 1956), American journalist
- Edward Baquet (died 1993), American restaurateur and civil rights activist
- George Baquet, (1881–1949) American jazz clarinetist
- Harold Baquet (1958–2015), American photographer
- Maurice Baquet (1911–2005), French actor and cellist

== Other uses ==
- Baquet (car body style), a style of touring car
- A medical treatment developed by Franz Mesmer

== See also ==
- Bouquet (disambiguation)
- Banquet (disambiguation)
