= Joseph Frederick Waring =

Joseph Frederick Waring may refer to:

- J. Fred. Waring (1832–1876), officer of the Confederate States Army
- Joseph Frederick Waring (scholar) (1902–1972), American scholar, preservationist and author
