= Manassas Station Operations =

Coordinates: 38.7322°N 77.5453°W

- Part of the American Civil War
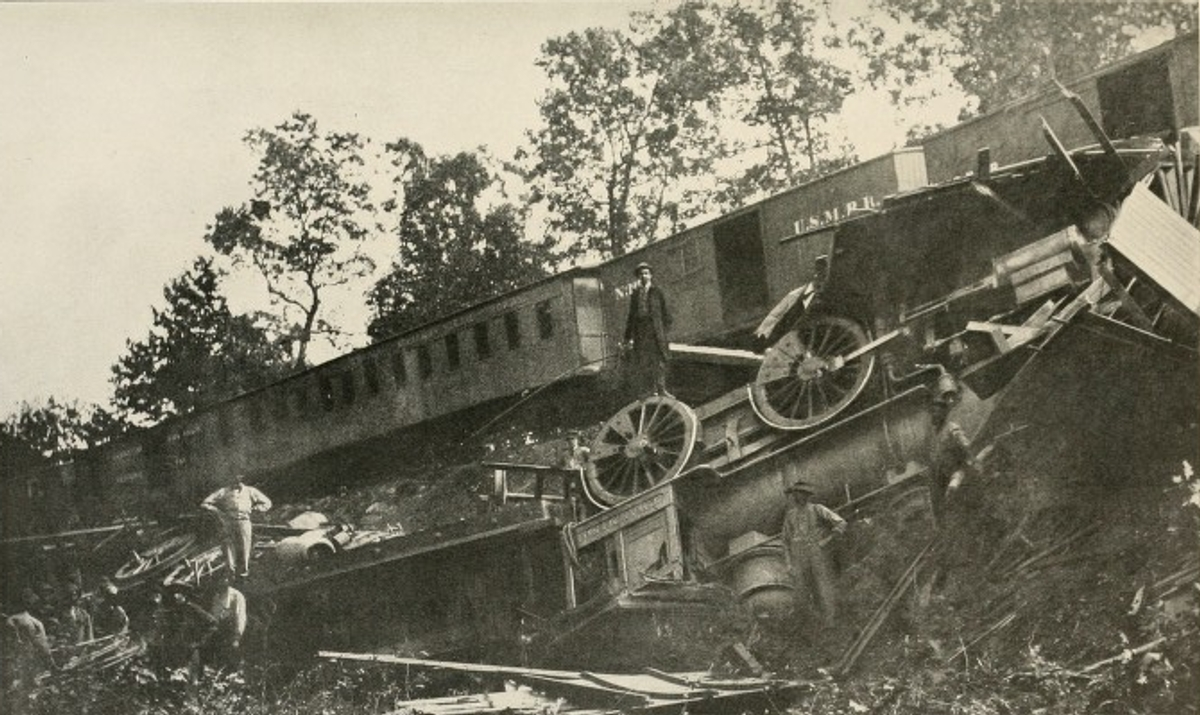
- Train derailed by Confederate cavalry on August 26, 1862, during the Manassas Station Operations.
Date	August 25, 1862 – August 27, 1862
Location	Prince William County, Virginia
Result	Confederate victory

Belligerents
United States	Confederate States

Commanders and leaders
(United States) George W. Taylor † (United States) Joseph Hooker	Stonewall Jackson; Richard S. Ewell

Units involved
Detachments, (United States) Army of Virginia	Left Wing, Army of Northern Virginia

Casualties and losses
400–450 (Note: 1,144 according to Naisawald)	173

The Manassas Station Operations included the operations known as Bristoe Station, Kettle Run, Bull Run Bridge, or Union Mills. It took place August 25–27, 1862, in Prince William County, Virginia, as part of the Northern Virginia Campaign of the American Civil War.

On the evening of August 26, after passing around Union Maj. Gen. John Pope's right flank via Thoroughfare Gap, Confederate Maj. Gen. Thomas J. "Stonewall" Jackson's wing of the army struck the Orange & Alexandria Railroad at Bristoe Station and before daybreak August 27 marched to capture and destroy the massive Union supply depot at Manassas Junction. This surprise movement forced Pope's Army of Virginia into an abrupt retreat from his defensive line along the Rappahannock River.

On August 27, Jackson routed a Union brigade near Union Mills (Bull Run Bridge), inflicting several hundred casualties and mortally wounding Union Brig. Gen. George W. Taylor. Maj. Gen. Richard S. Ewell's Confederate division fought a brisk rearguard action against Maj. Gen. Joseph Hooker's Union division at Kettle Run, resulting in about 600 casualties. Ewell held back Union forces until dark. That night, Jackson marched his divisions north to the Bull Run battlefield, where he took position behind an unfinished railroad grade.

== Background ==
In mid-August 1862, Confederate General Robert E. Lee attempted to cut the supply and communications lines of the Union Army of Virginia, commanded by Major General John Pope, but the Confederate offensive was stalled following the First Battle of Rappahannock Station. To break the stalemate, Lee sent the Left Wing of the army under Major General Thomas J. Jackson around the right of the Union army, through Thoroughfare Gap, and cut the Orange and Alexandria Railroad, breaking the Union supply line. The other Confederate wing commanded by Major General James Longstreet would hold Pope's attention along the Rappahannock and then follow Jackson after thirty six hours. Jackson started his march at 3 a.m. on August 25.

Jackson's movement was observed by the Union army about 9 a.m. but Pope thought Jackson was marching to the Shenandoah Valley. Consequently, he turned his attention to Longstreet's wing, which was demonstrating along the Rappahannock River during the day. Pope's orders throughout the day were contradictory and the Union army was unable to mount an attack across the river as Pope intended. When Union cavalry spotted Jackson coming through Thoroughfare Gap, Pope pulled his forces back from the river and attempted to locate Jackson's force.

== Operations at Manassas Station ==
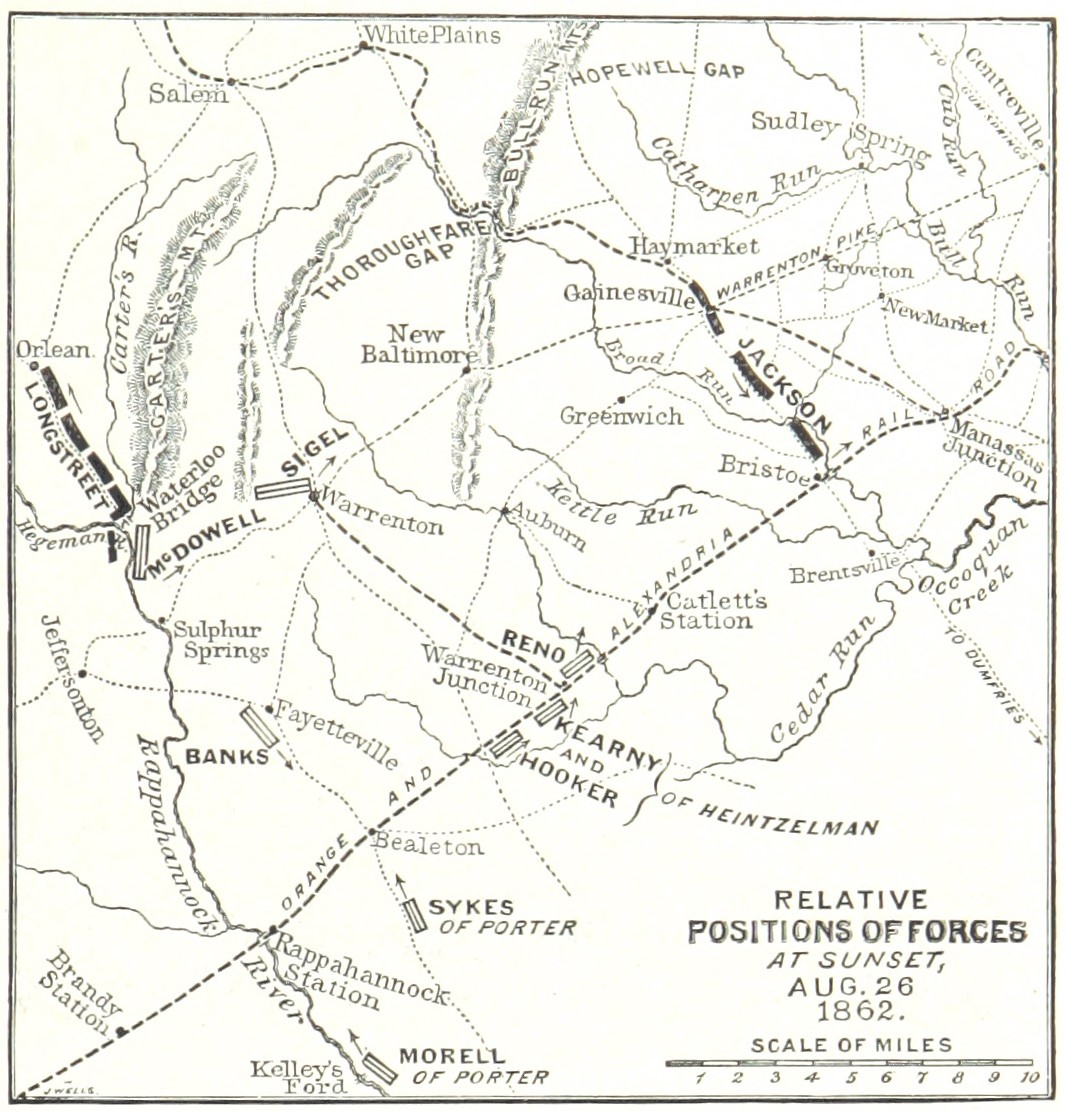
Positions of forces at sunset on 26 August

Jackson reached Bristoe Station on the Orange and Alexandria Railroad during the afternoon of the 26th, where his troops proceeded to wreck two trains and tear up several miles of tracks. When he learned that there was a Union supply depot at Manassas Junction several miles to the northeast, Jackson detached the brigade of Isaac R. Trimble along with cavalry support to capture the junction. After a night march Trimble launched an attack which overran the small Union garrison, capturing over 300 prisoners and eight cannons, at the loss of four men. After receiving word of the Confederate attack on Manassas Junction during the night, Pope tried to launch several Union columns against Jackson's wing in order to surround the Confederates. He started the Army of Virginia marching northeast towards Manassas and ordered detachments from the Union forces in Washington to move by railroad westward to Manassas. The brigades of George W. Taylor and E. Parker Scammon started on the morning of August 27. Meanwhile, Jackson left Richard S. Ewell's division at Bristoe's Station to watch for Union forces and moved A. P. Hill's and William B. Taliaferro's divisions to reinforce Trimble's brigade.

Just as Hill's division arrived at Manassas Junction, Trimble was attacked by the 2nd New York Heavy Artillery, but the attack was quickly repulsed with Hill's help. At this time, Taylor arrived by train and, unaware that he was outnumbered, proceeded to deploy his brigade for an attack. Heavy Confederate fire, especially from the artillery, caused Taylor's brigade to rout and Taylor himself was mortally wounded. Scammon's two regiments arrived and served as a rear-guard to cover the Union retreat. Union losses totaled nearly 450 (including over 200 prisoners), while the Confederates lost only twenty-five men.

To the west, Ewell deployed his division along Kettle Run to serve as protection for Jackson's rear against Pope's forces. Joseph Hooker's division of the Union III Corps first encountered Ewell's skirmishers about 2:30 p.m. Ewell was able to hold his position for over an hour but Hooker then brought up his own artillery and tried to outflank the Confederate line. Shortly after 4 p.m., Ewell received orders from Jackson to retreat to Manassas Junction and successfully disengaged; Hooker was unable to pursue due to the bridge across Broad Run to the north which was burned. Ewell lost less than 150 men in the fight, while Hooker lost 400 men.

== Aftermath ==
Now aware that Pope was nearby, Jackson decided to move north to the scene of the First Battle of Bull Run, where he could link up with Longstreet or retreat further north towards Aldie as circumstances dictated. After allowing the soldiers to take as much supplies as they could carry, Jackson had the rest of the supplies burned at midnight and started his troops north.

Pope saw the fires at Manassas Junction but believed that it meant Jackson was desperate; he ordered his corps to march on Manassas from the south, east, and north. Pope knew that Longstreet was moving north towards Thoroughfare Gap but did not detach any force to delay him, believing that the Union army could defeat Jackson before Longstreet could arrive. The defeat of Taylor's force convinced George B. McClellan, commanding the Union forces in Washington, not to send any further reinforcements to Pope unless they had artillery and cavalry.
