= A. Judson Clark =

Civil War soldier (1838-1913)

Adoniram Judson Clark (October 1838 – July 24, 1913) commanded a New Jersey battery in the American Civil War.

== Civil War ==
Clark enlisted in the 1st New Jersey Volunteer Infantry in April 1861, and became a sergeant in Company F. When the regiment's three-month enlistment ended, Clark was involved in raising Battery B, 1st New Jersey Light Artillery. It was mustered into service on September 3, 1861, at Camp Olden in Trenton, New Jersey. The battery was assigned to the First New Jersey Brigade under the command of Brigadier General Philip Kearny. Clark became first lieutenant under Capt John E. Beam.

The battery served in the Peninsula Campaign, assigned to III Corps. Beam was killed in the Battle of Malvern Hill on July 1, 1862. Upon the death of Beam, Clark was promoted to the rank of captain. He commanded the battery to the end of the war. The battery was not engaged again until the Battle of Fredericksburg, in which it was assigned to second division III Corps under Brigadier General Daniel Sickles. Clark commanded the artillery attached to first division III Corps at the Battle of Chancellorsville under Brigadier General David B. Birney.

In the artillery brigade of the III Corps, Clark and his battery served at the Battle of Gettysburg. His guns were deployed in an exposed position near the Peach Orchard on July 2, 1863, but then were moved to safer ground. The battery fired on the Confederate troops advancing from Warfield Ridge before being forced to withdraw. Clark reported that he pulled out when support disappeared on either flank. When Captain George E. Randolph, the brigade's commander, was wounded, Clark became acting commander. He retained brigade command in the Bristoe Campaign. Randolph returned in time for the Battle of Mine Run, and Clark resumed battery command.

When III Corps was abolished, Clark's battery was transferred to the Reserve Artillery in the brigade of Major John A. Tompkins. In that formation, Clark's battery served in the early battles of the Overland Campaign. By the time of the Battle of Cold Harbor, Clark's battery had been transferred to the artillery brigade of II Corps under Colonel John C. Tidball. In the Siege of Petersburg, Clark's battery remained in II Corp under Tidball and then under Colonel John G. Hazard. Clark was slightly wounded at the Second Battle of Ream's Station in 1864. Later he escorted the troops in his battery whose enlistments had expired back to Trenton, New Jersey, before returning to the Petersburg front. Back at Petersburg, Clark was in charge of the artillery on the front lines of II Corps in December 1864.

At the beginning of the Appomattox Campaign, Clark's battery provided support to II Corps troops engaged at the Battle of Sutherland's Station. Following the Confederate surrender, Clark and his command were mustered out on June 16, 1865.

Judson Clark was recommended for promotion more than once, but the most he received was a brevet rank of major, conferred on April 2, 1865, for his service at Petersburg.

== Post war ==
After the war, Major Clark served as police chief in Newark. An active Republican, he next was secretary of the Board of Assessment and Revision of Taxes and Receiver of Taxes (ca. 1888). Capt Clark was named to the Board of Assessment and Taxes in 1900. He also was an officer in the New Jersey National Guard. A. Judson Clark died in 1913. He was buried in Evergreen Cemetery, Hillside, New Jersey.

== Sources ==
- Hanifen, Michael, History of Battery B, First New Jersey Artillery, Ottawa, Ill., Republican-times, printers, 1905.
- Pfanz, Harry W., Gettysburg the Second Day, Chapel Hill, University of North Carolina Press, 1987.
- Toombs, Samuel, New Jersey Troops in the Gettysburg Campaign, from June 5 to July 31, 1863, Highstown, N.J.: Longstreet House, 1988.
