= 3rd New Jersey Infantry Regiment =

- Active: June 4, 1861 to June 29, 1865
- Disbanded: June 29, 1865
- Country: United States
- Allegiance: Union
- Branch: United States Army; Union Army
- Type: Infantry
- Part of: 1st Brigade, 1st Division, VI Corps
- Engagements: American Civil War

Commanders
- Notable commanders: Col. George W. Taylor

The 3rd New Jersey Infantry Regiment was an infantry regiment of the Union Army in the American Civil War. Composed of men from New Jersey, it served in the Army of the Potomac.

== History ==
The 3rd New Jersey Infantry Regiment was recruited and mustered into Federal service in May 1861, and was brigaded with the 1st New Jersey Volunteer Infantry, the 2nd New Jersey Volunteer Infantry, and the 4th New Jersey Volunteer Infantry to make up what became famed as the "First New Jersey Brigade". Early on, the regiment participated in small actions such as the Bog Wallow Ambush in Northern Virginia. The regiment and brigade served as the 1st Brigade of the 1st Division of the VI Corps, and participated in numerous battles from the June 27, 1862, Battle of Gaines Mill, Virginia, to the final Union assaults on Confederate positions at Petersburg, Virginia, in April 1865.

The remnants of the 3rd New Jersey Volunteer Infantry were mustered out at Hall's Hill, Virginia, on June 29, 1865.

== Notable personnel ==
- Colonel George W. Taylor-later a Brigadier General and commander of the brigade until mortally wounded during the August 1862 Second Bull Run Campaign.
- Colonel Henry Brown - succeeded George Taylor as regiment commander, and later commanded the brigade.
- 1st Lieutenant Edward Burd Grubb, Jr. - brevetted Brigadier General at the end of the war.
- Lieutenant Colonel Mark Wilkes Collet - later Colonel of the 1st New Jersey Volunteer Infantry.
- Lieutenant Colonel James N. Duffy - aide to Major General George G. Meade, and post-war commissioner of the New Jersey Gettysburg Battlefield Commission, which was responsible for the creation and placement of New Jersey monuments at the Gettysburg National Military Park.

== See also ==
- List of New Jersey Civil War Units
