= George W. Taylor (general) =

American Union Army officer

George William Taylor
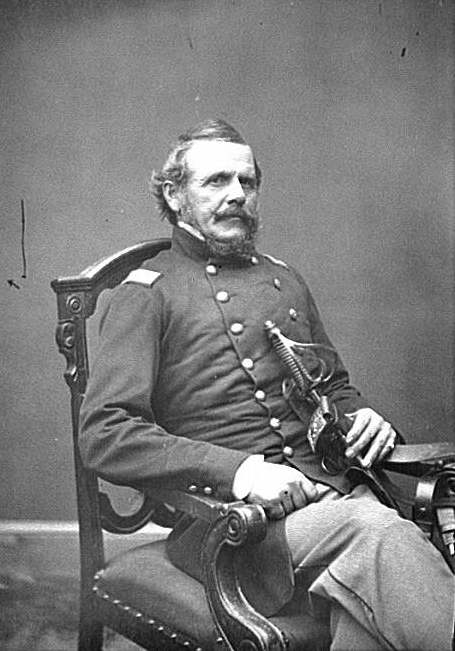
- Born: November 22, 1808; High Bridge, New Jersey, U.S.
- Died: August 31, 1862 (aged 53); Alexandria, Virginia, U.S.
- Burial place: Presbyterian Churchyard
- Military career
- Allegiance: United States; Union
- Branch: United States Navy; United States Army; Union Army
- Service years: 1827–1831 (Navy); 1847–1848; 1861–1862 (Army)
- Rank: Midshipman; Brigadier general
- Unit: Army of the Potomac
- Commands: 3rd New Jersey Volunteer Infantry; First New Jersey Brigade
- Conflicts: Mexican-American War American Civil War: First Battle of Bull Run; Bog Wallow Ambush; Peninsula Campaign; Seven Days Battles; First Battle of Rappahannock Station; Battle of Manassas Station †

George William Taylor (November 22, 1808 – August 31, 1862) was a general in the Union Army during the American Civil War. He commanded a brigade in the Army of the Potomac before being mortally wounded at the Battle of Manassas Station in Northern Virginia. The poem "The General's Death" by Joseph O'Connor was based on George W. Taylor's death.

== Early life and career ==
Taylor was born at "Solitude," the family's mansion near High Bridge, New Jersey, which was the home to five generations of the Taylor family. He was the son of Arch Taylor, a prominent local businessman. Taylor graduated from a private military academy in Middletown, Connecticut. George W. Taylor joined his father's company as an ironworker with Taylor Iron Works. Taylor Iron Works/Taylor Wharton is the oldest foundry in US History and the 13th longest continually operating company in the world history (Economist 2004)

In 1827, Taylor joined the United States Navy as a midshipman, serving aboard the USS Fairfield during her Mediterranean deployment from 1828 to 1831. When the ship returned to the U.S., he resigned from the Navy and entered his family's mercantile business. With the outbreak of the war with Mexico in 1846, he became a captain in the 10th U.S. Infantry under Zachary Taylor the following year. While in Mexico, he developed a reputation for discipline and order among his men. He also cultivated a strong friendship with Philip Kearny, a fellow future Civil War general.

After receiving his honorable discharge with the end of the hostilities, Taylor joined the California Gold Rush and spent three years mining at Corte Madera, California, (near San Francisco) before returning to New Jersey, where he engaged in the manufacturing of iron until the Civil War erupted in early 1861.

== Civil War service ==
Taylor helped recruit and organize what became the 3rd New Jersey Volunteer Infantry in May 1861 and was appointed by Governor Olden as the new regiment's first colonel. His son, Archibald II, served as his aide-de-camp. Taylor was involved in the fighting at the First Battle of Bull Run. Later, his 3rd New Jersey was brigaded with the 1st, 2nd, and 4th New Jersey Volunteer Infantry to make up what became famed as the "First New Jersey Brigade". Taylor's regiment served in the 1st Brigade, 1st Division of the VI Corps, in numerous battles in the Seven Days Battles during the end of the Peninsula Campaign.

When his mentor and friend Kearny was elevated to division command in June 1862, Taylor was promoted to brigadier general (date of rank May 9, 1862) of the 1st New Jersey Brigade, leading it in the Seven Days Battles. During the Northern Virginia Campaign, his brigade was sent down from Washington to scout out Confederate troop movements. On August 27, the brigade stumbled into Stonewall Jackson's entire corps and was quickly routed. Taylor suffered a severe leg wound from an artillery shell and died in a Washington hospital four days later.

His body was transported to Clinton, New Jersey, via train, where hundreds of people turned out for his funeral. He was buried there in Riverside Cemetery (also known as Clinton Presbyterian Churchyard). A year later, his nephew was killed at the Battle of Chancellorsville and buried beside him.

== See also ==
- List of American Civil War generals (Union)
