= Bog Wallow Ambush =

Battle of the American civil War

- Part of the American Civil War
Date	December 4, 1861
Location	Fairfax County, Virginia 38°48.64′N 77°15.71′W
Result	Union victory

Belligerents
United States	Confederate States

Commanders and leaders
George W. Taylor	J. Fred. Waring

Strength
55	24

Casualties and losses
1 Killed, 2 Wounded and 1 Captured	4 Wounded and 1 Captured

The Bog Wallow Ambush was a small unit action during the American Civil War that took place between Confederate forces under Captain J. Fred. Waring and Union forces under Colonel George W. Taylor on December 4, 1861, in Fairfax County, Virginia, as part of Maj. Gen. George B. McClellan's operations in northern Virginia. The Union force set up an ambush for the Confederate force on the Braddock Road. The action resulted in a Union victory.

== Background ==
Following the Battle of Ball's Bluff on October 21, 1861, major offensive action was halted in the eastern theater, as both armies went into winter quarters. Small detachments were still occasionally sent out to probe the enemy's position and to obtain forage. On the night of November 5, 1861, a shootout occurred between members of the units later involved in the ambush at Oak Hill mansion, in an area of such probing and patrolling. Members of the Union force also intended to retaliate for the Confederate force's attacks on Union pickets.

== Opposing forces ==
=== Confederate ===
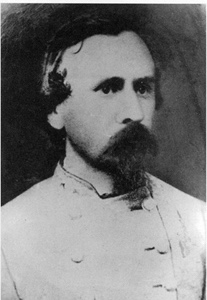
Capt. J. Fred. Waring (later Col)

Commander: J. Fred. Waring

Georgia Hussars (later Jeff Davis Cavalry Legion, Company 'F')

=== Union ===
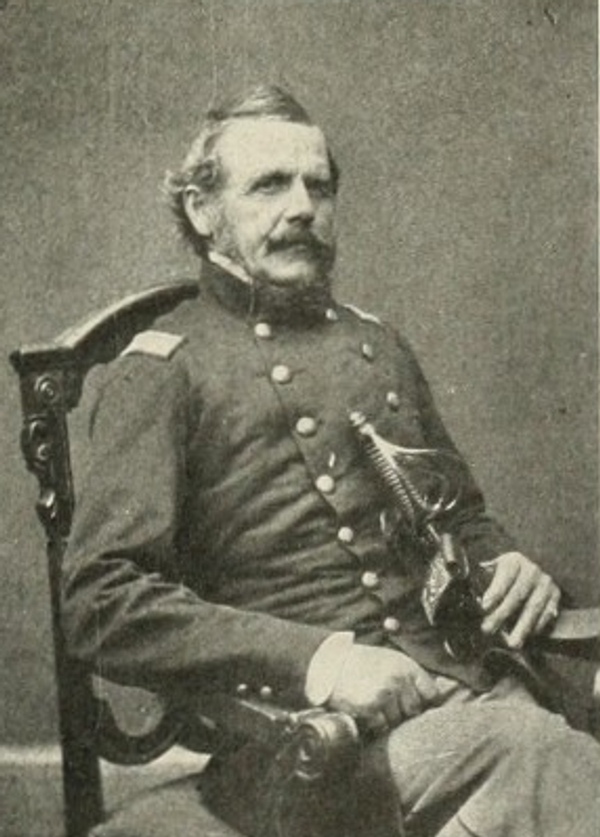
Col. George W. Taylor (later Brig Gen)

Commander: Col George W. Taylor

3rd New Jersey Volunteer Infantry, part of the First New Jersey Brigade

== The Ambush ==
On December 4, 1861, 3rd New Jersey Infantry troops stretched two telegraph wires across Braddock Road at the eastern end of a "perfect bog hole" to dismount riders of the Georgia Hussars in the middle of the night. A "sheet of fire" erupted from the tree line along the swamp's edge when this happened; the Confederates returned fire and escaped, with casualties on both sides.

== Aftermath ==
This was a small unit action of no strategic importance and resulted in only light casualties. However, it is representative of many such actions in northern Virginia during the early part of the American Civil War.

== Commemoration ==
A new historic marker was unveiled May 5, 2013, at the intersection of Braddock Road and Dunleigh Drive in Burke to commemorate the “Bog Wallow Ambush.” The marker is just outside Annandale. Dunleigh Drive is on the southern side of Braddock Road between Rolling Road and Guinea Road.
