= Alfred Thomas Archimedes Torbert =

American diplomat

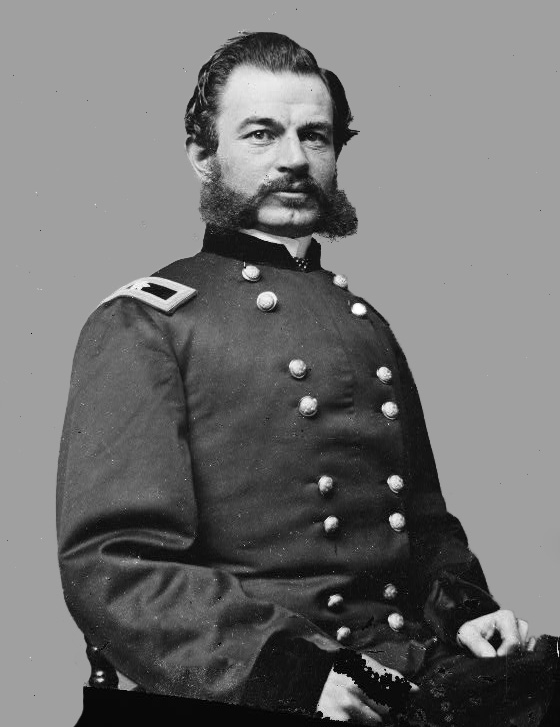
- General Alfred Thomas Torbert
- Born: July 1, 1833; Georgetown, Delaware, U.S.
- Died: August 29, 1880 (aged 47); Atlantic Ocean (off Cape Canaveral, Florida)
- Burial place: Avenue Methodist Episcopal Cemetery, Milford, Delaware
- Military career
- Allegiance: United States of America; Union
- Branch: United States Army; Union Army
- Service years: 1855–1866
- Rank: Brevet Major General
- Commands: 1st New Jersey Volunteer Infantry; First New Jersey Brigade
- Conflicts: American Civil War

Alfred Thomas Archimedes Torbert (July 1, 1833 – August 29, 1880) was a career United States Army officer, a Union Army General commanding both infantry and cavalry forces in the American Civil War, and a U.S. diplomat.

== Early life ==
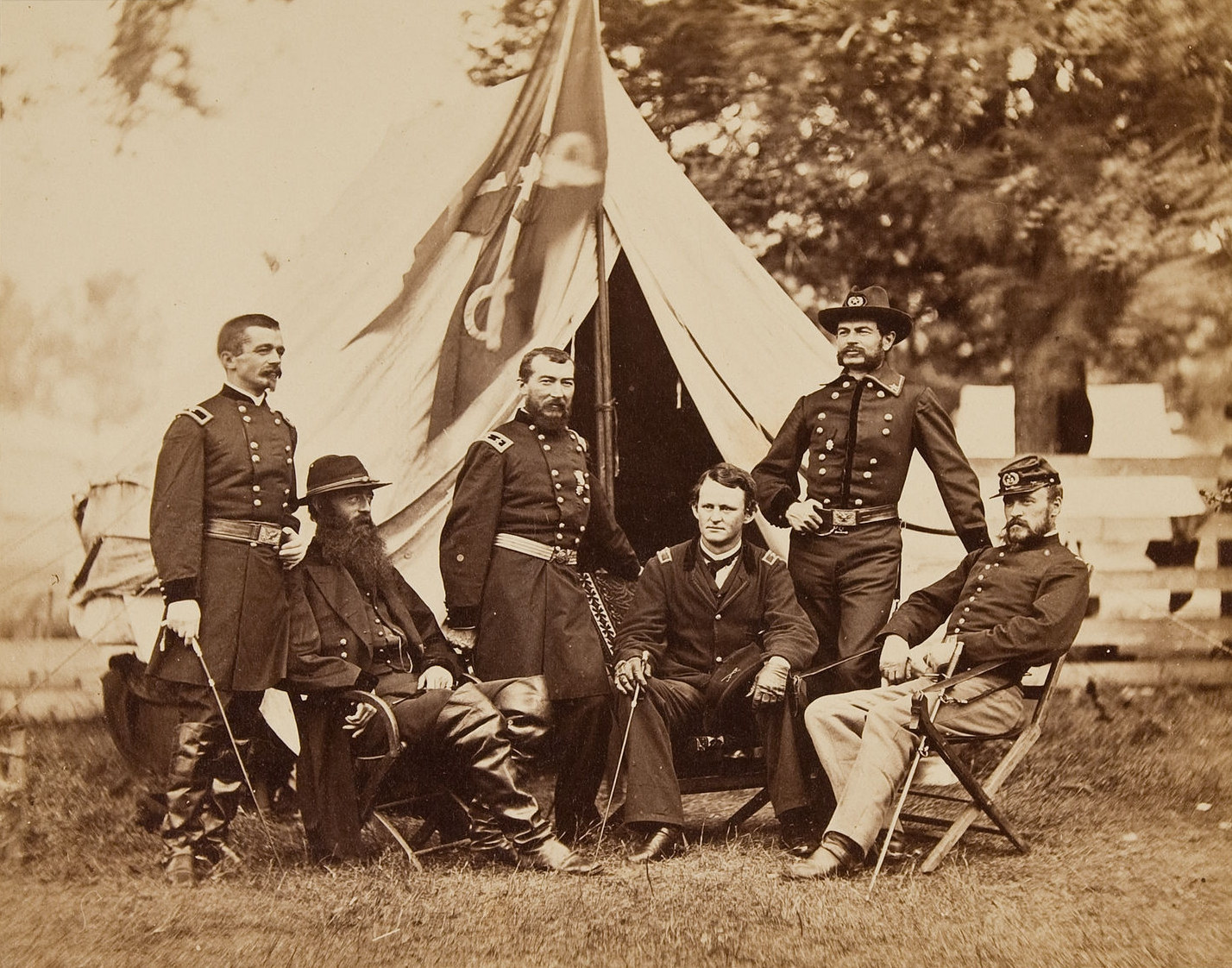
Maj. Gen. Philip Sheridan and his generals in front of Sheridan's tent, 1864. Left to right: Henry E. Davies, David McM. Gregg, Sheridan, Wesley Merritt, Alfred Torbert, and James H. Wilson.

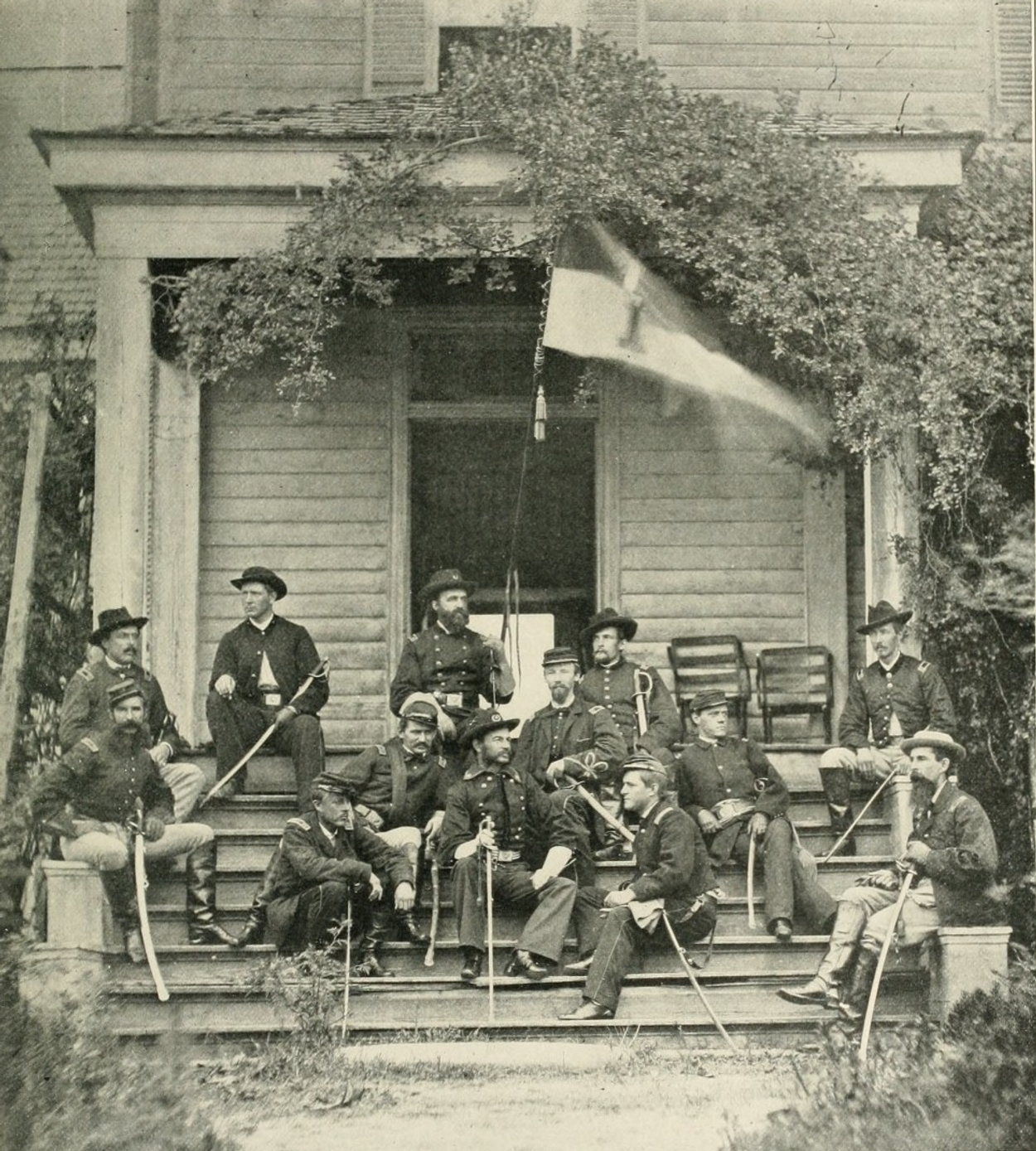
Union cavalry general Alfred T. A. Torbert (seated center holding saber in front of him) and staff at their headquarters during the Shenandoah Valley campaign under Sheridan in 1864.

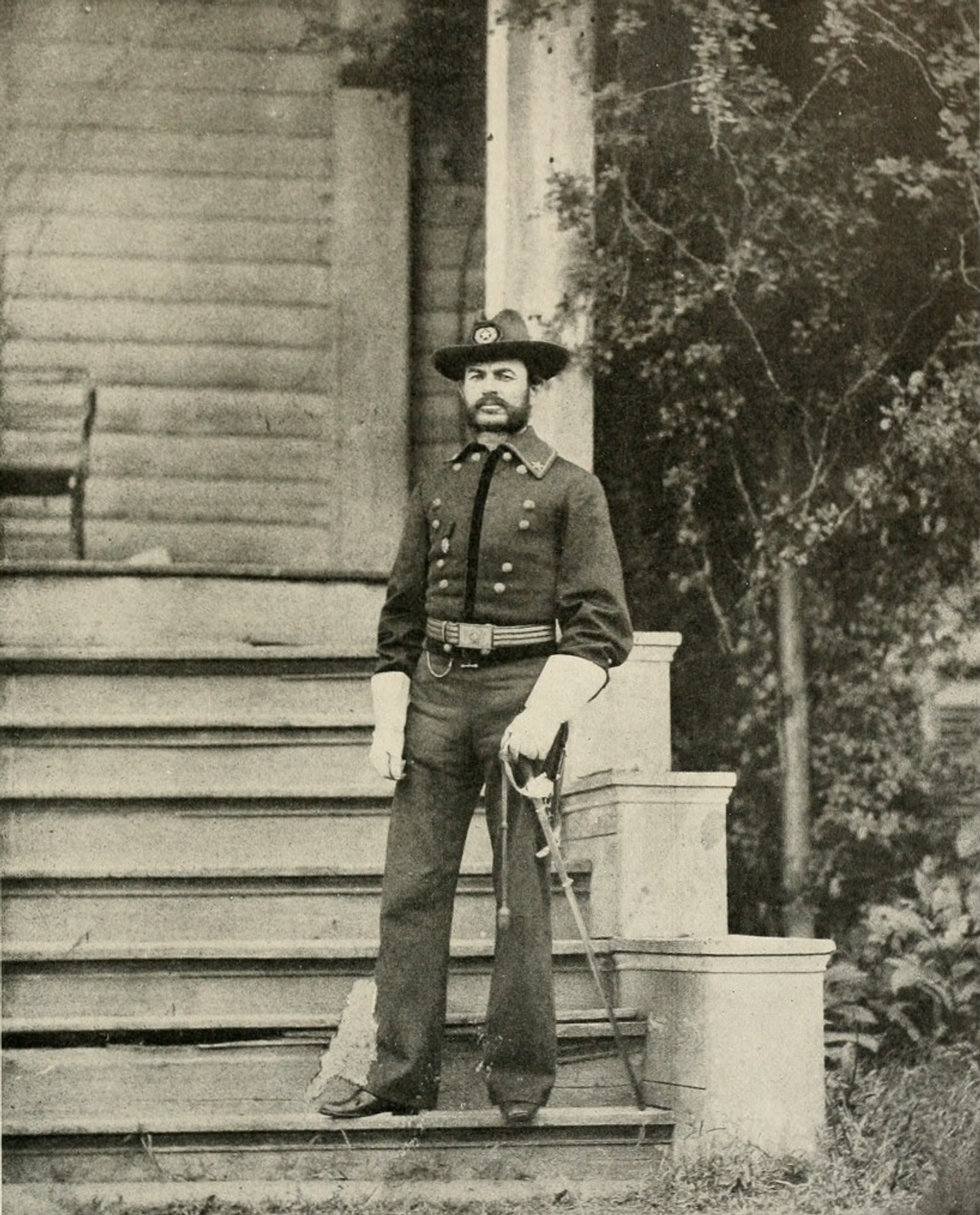
Torbert in Autumn 1864 in the Shenandoah Valley

Torbert was born in Georgetown, Delaware. He graduated 21st in a class of 34 from the United States Military Academy in 1855 and was commissioned a brevet second lieutenant in the 2nd U.S. Infantry Regiment. His West Point roommate was William B. Hazen.

== Civil War ==
Just before the start of the Civil War, Torbert was appointed a first lieutenant in the Confederate States Army on March 16, 1861, but he refused the appointment and remained a lieutenant in the U.S. Army. By September 16, he was appointed colonel of the 1st New Jersey Infantry and, by August 29, 1862, he was a brigade commander in the VI Corps of the Army of the Potomac. In the Maryland Campaign of 1862, he was wounded at Crampton's Gap in the Battle of South Mountain. He was promoted to brigadier general on November 29, 1862. Torbert commanded his New Jersey brigade in the campaigns leading to the Battle of Fredericksburg, the Battle of Chancellorsville, and the Battle of Gettysburg.

On April 10, 1864, Torbert was given command the 1st Division of the Cavalry Corps of the Army of the Potomac, following the death of Maj. Gen. John Buford. Torbert commanded during the Overland Campaign, except when ill following the Battle of Spotsylvania Court House. During Maj. Gen. Philip Sheridan's Valley Campaigns of 1864, Torbert was the Chief of the Cavalry for the Army of the Shenandoah and led the cavalry at important battles such as the Battle of Third Winchester and the Battle of Cedar Creek. Torbert's final campaign as cavalry chief in the Army of the Shenandoah was during a raid against the Virginia Central Railroad near Gordonsville, Virginia, also called the Luray Raid, from December 19 to 28, 1864. The campaign was plagued by intense cold, rain, snow, and hail, and hundreds of Torbert's men suffered from frostbite. Following this failed raid, Torbert went on extended leave through February 1865.

Following the Gordonsville raid, Torbert never again held Sheridan's confidence as a combat commander, and in late March, Torbert was ordered to remain in the Shenandoah Valley when Sheridan returned to Petersburg, Virginia. Torbert commanded the vestigial Army of the Shenandoah from April 22 to July 12, 1865, with his headquarters in Winchester, Virginia. Wesley Merritt commanded Torbert's former corps under Sheridan, which included two divisions, and would lead this command during the Appomattox campaign.

Torbert received brevet promotions in the Regular Army for his service at Gettysburg, Haw's Shop, Third Winchester, and Cedar Creek. Notably, Torbert was never promoted to the full rank of major general in the volunteers, even though he commanded a successful and prominent corps of cavalry at many important battles, suggesting that Sheridan was disappointed in Torbert's personal leadership during this time, despite any successes. From July through September 1865, Torbert commanded the District of Winchester, Virginia.

He later commanded the District of Southeastern Virginia, with his headquarters at Norfolk, Virginia from September through December 1865. He was mustered out of the volunteer service in January 1866 and placed on a leave of absence until October 31, 1866, when he resigned from the Army.

On October 11, 1865, Tobert was elected as a companion of the Commandery of Pennsylvania of the Military Order of the Loyal Legion of the United States (MOLLUS). He was assigned MOLLUS insignia number 52.

== Postbellum career ==
After the war, Torbert served in a number of diplomatic posts: as U.S. Consul to El Salvador in 1869, U.S. Consul General in Havana in 1871, and U.S. Consul General in Paris in 1873.

On August 29, 1880, while en route to Mexico aboard the steamship Vera Cruz, Torbert was washed off the deck during a violent hurricane off the coast of Florida near Cape Canaveral. Accounts of his death indicate he had made it to shore alive, over 20 hours after the ship sank, but drowned in the surf shortly thereafter. His body was recovered August 31, 1880 and buried in Daytona the next day. By September 23, he was disinterred and taken first to New York City, then to Philadelphia and then to his final resting place in the Avenue Methodist Episcopal Cemetery, Milford, Delaware, escorted by military units along the way. Memorial services were held in each of those three cities where, with hundreds attending, he was honored by officials from the U.S. government, military, and dignitaries from foreign countries.

== In memoriam ==
In 2008, a statue honoring General Torbert was erected in Milford.

== See also ==
- List of American Civil War generals (Union)

== Notes ==
Diplomatic posts
Preceded by Alpheus S. Williams	United States Minister Resident to El Salvador; October 27, 1869–May 10, 1871	Succeeded by Thomas Biddle
