= Abraham Kaiser =

Late 19th and early 20th century Jewish American businessman and politician

Abraham Kaiser (July 15, 1852 – April 19, 1912) was a Jewish-American businessman and politician from New Jersey.

== Early life ==
Kaiser was born on July 15, 1852, in New York City, New York. He moved to Newark, New Jersey, with his parents in 1853.

== Education ==
Kaiser attended Newark public schools and was one of the first students to enter the recently erected Chestnut Street School. He worked as a successful cigar manufacturer for a number of years. In 1883, he entered the compressed yeast business.

== Career ==
In 1902, he was elected Alderman in the Seventh Ward, the second Republican ever elected from that ward. He served as alderman until 1904. In 1903, he was elected to the New Jersey General Assembly as a Republican, serving as one of the representatives from Essex County. He served in the Assembly in 1904 and 1905. While in the Assembly, he was the only member of the Committee on Game and Fisheries that favored a bill that made it unlawful to shoot pigeons from traps. He submitted a minority report in favor of the bill, which was adopted by the Assembly.

Kaiser was treasurer of the Seventh Ward Republican Club and a member of the Freemasons, the Odd Fellows, the Knights of Pythias. the Republican County Committee.

== Jewish community involvement ==
He was a director of the Hebrew Orphan Asylum and a member of the Congregation B'nai Jeshurun.

== Building and loan associations ==
He was also involved in building and loans circles, serving as president of the Mercantile Building and Loan Association and treasurer of the Sixth Ward Building and Loan Association, the Second Ward Building and Loan Association, and the Pride of Newark Building and Loan Association.

== Personal life ==
He was married to Fannie Isenberg. Their children were Emannual, Mrs. Leon Schlosser, Mrs. E. W. Markens, and Mrs. Isaac Gluckmann.

== Death ==
Kaiser died at home from apoplexy on April 19, 1912. He was buried in Evergreen Cemetery in Elizabeth.
