= Homer W. Wheeler =

American army officer and author

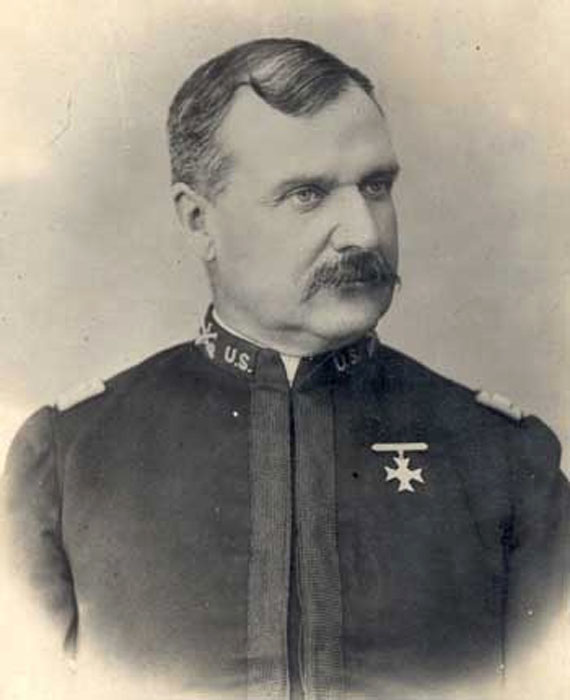
- Born: May 13, 1848; Montgomery, Vermont
- Died: April 11, 1930 (aged 81); Los Angeles, California
- Burial place: Evergreen Cemetery, Hillside, New Jersey
- Education: Eastman Business College
- Spouse: Mary Isabel Dougherty (m. 1888-1891, her death)
- Relatives: David Olmsted (grand-uncle); Orville E. Babcock (uncle); Lorenzo A. Babcock (uncle)
- Military career
- Allegiance: United States
- Branch: United States Army
- Service years: 1875-1911
- Rank: Colonel
- Unit: U.S. Cavalry Branch
- Commands: Troop G, 5th Cavalry Regiment; 1st Squadron, 11th Cavalry Regiment; 2nd Squadron, 11th Cavalry Regiment; 5th Cavalry Regiment; Schofield Barracks; District of Hawaii
- Conflicts: American Indian Wars; Spanish–American War; First occupation of Cuba
- Other work: Author

Homer W. Wheeler (May 13, 1848 – April 11, 1930) was an American military officer and author. A veteran of the American Indian Wars and Spanish–American War, he attained the rank of colonel and wrote several books, including memoirs of his experiences on the western frontier of the United States in the late 1800s.

Wheeler was a native of Montgomery, Vermont, and was raised in Montgomery and in Winona, Minnesota. He attended New Hampton Institute in Fairfax, Vermont and graduated from Eastman Business College in Poughkeepsie, New York in 1866. After working for the United States Army as a civilian, in 1875 he received a commission as a second lieutenant of Cavalry. He served in the American Indian Wars and Spanish–American War, primarily as a member of the 5th Cavalry Regiment. He later served in the 11th Cavalry Regiment, then commanded the 5th Cavalry Regiment before retiring in 1911.

After leaving the Army, Wheeler was a successful writer, and he authored several autobiographical works detailing his career in the western United States. He died in Los Angeles, California on April 11, 1930, and was buried at Evergreen Cemetery in Hillside, New Jersey.

== Early life ==
Homer Webster Wheeler was born in Montgomery, Vermont on May 13, 1848, the son of Augustus C. Wheeler and Lucretia (Babcock) Wheeler. His relatives included David Olmsted, who was his grand-uncle, and Orville E. Babcock and Lorenzo A. Babcock, who were his uncles. Wheeler's family moved to Winona, Minnesota when he was ten years old. His mother became ill when he was 13, and the family returned to Vermont. After his mother's death, he was raised in Montgomery by his grandmother. Wheeler attended New Hampton Institute in Fairfax, Vermont, then began working for the Central Vermont Railway, for which he loaded and unloaded freight at its facility at St. Albans station. With several friends, Wheeler traveled to Burlington, Vermont and attempted to enlist in the Union Army, but they were rejected for being too young and not having the permission of their parents.

When Augustus Wheeler established a general store in Montgomery, Wheeler left his position at the railroad to work in the store. Wheeler subsequently attended Eastman Business College in Poughkeepsie, New York. After graduating in 1866, he resided in New York City, where he worked as the shipping clerk for a silversmith. When the firm went out of business, Wheeler obtained a civilian position in the transportation department of the quartermaster's office for the Army's Department of the East.

== Move to Kansas ==
In June 1868, Wheeler accepted the offer of employment at the trading post of Fort Wallace, Kansas. On his way to Fort Wallace, Wheeler stopped at Lawrence, Kansas to visit his uncle Carmi William Babcock, who was acquainted with General Ulysses S. Grant and serving as U.S. surveyor general of Kansas. Wheeler's uncle Orville Babcock served in the army with Grant, and when Wheeler resumed his journey, he discovered that the train's passengers included Grant and Grant's staff. Wheeler used the Grant connection to his Babcock uncles to introduce himself to Grant, who invited Wheeler to sit with him until the end of the railroad line in Monument, Kansas, where Grant continued his journey to Denver by stagecoach.

After arrival at Fort Wallace, Wheeler became friendly with William Comstock, the post's guide and American Indian interpreter. Wheeler accompanied Comstock on several hunting and scouting trips, which equipped Wheeler with a working knowledge of the local terrain and the culture of the local Indians. During his time at Fort Wallace, Wheeler also became acquainted with Wild Bill Hickok and Buffalo Bill Cody while they were employed as Army scouts. Afterwards, he continued to correspond and visit with them, and he met in person with Cody for the final time in 1915.

In September 1868, Wheeler volunteered for one of three expedition that attempted to rescue U.S. troops following the Battle of Beecher Island. By the time they arrived, most of the soldiers had been killed, and the party Wheeler was part of buried the dead who had not already been interred, and led the few survivors back to Fort Wallace. As the conflict with Indians in the area continued to grow, Wheeler was employed several times to carry messages from Fort Wallace to other posts and return with replies as local Army commanders worked to coordinate their activities.

In 1869, Wheeler was employed as leader of a team that ran wagon trains which hauled freight from the terminus of the Kansas Pacific Railway in Monument to the freight's final destination in Denver. In 1870, Wheeler used his savings from the trading post and wagon train jobs to buy the Rose Creek Ranch, which was located near Fort Wallace. He then accepted a contract to supply beef to the Army at Fort Wallace. In 1870, Wheeler also took over the trading post at Fort Wallace, which he continued to operate in addition to running his ranch.

Wheeler continued to take part as a volunteer in scouting parties and expeditions during times of conflict with Indians in Kansas and Colorado. After the 1875 Battle of Painted Woman's Fork, Wheeler discovered that Indians had slaughtered most of his cattle. In October, he found that General John Pope, the commander of the Department of the Missouri, had recommended him for appointment as an officer in the Army in recognition of his work as a scout and guide. Pope's request included an endorsement from Wheeler's uncle Orville Babcock, then serving as private secretary to Ulysses Grant, who had become president in 1869. Offered a commission as a second lieutenant of Cavalry, he accepted in December, and was assigned to Troop L, 5th Cavalry Regiment.

== Military career ==
Wheeler remained with the 5th Cavalry for 25 years and served primarily in the western United States during several campaigns of the American Indian Wars. In 1883, he graduated from the Infantry and Cavalry School at Fort Leavenworth, Kansas. He was promoted to first lieutenant on October 13, 1884. On April 7, 1893, he received promotion to captain. In 1892, Wheeler was appointed as U.S. Indian Agent for members of the Cheyenne and Arapahoe tribes at the Darlington Agency in Indian Territory (now Oklahoma). He served in this position briefly before being assigned as commander of Troop G, 5th Cavalry at Fort Brown, Texas.

At the start of the Spanish–American War in 1898, Wheeler led his troop to Fort Sam Houston, Texas, where the 5th Cavalry was consolidated prior to moving to New Orleans, Louisiana, Mobile, Alabama, and Tampa, Florida. While awaiting transportation to Cuba, most of the regiment became ill with malaria and other diseases and was sent to Huntsville, Alabama to recuperate. In November 1898, the 5th Cavalry departed for service in Puerto Rico, and Wheeler led his troop during duty in Aibonito. Wheeler was charged with overseeing civil-military activities in the district that included Aibonito. When a hurricane struck in 1899, he supervised the reconstruction of his troop's military post as well as the relief of the civilian population, including emergency food and water supplies, construction of a hospital, and the rebuilding of homes. He later employed several local men and boys in the construction of a much-needed road between Aiboneto and Barranquitas, which was completed shortly after he left Puerto Rico in May 1901.

Wheeler was promoted to major in the 9th Cavalry on October 29, 1902. He was subsequently assigned to the 11th Cavalry and appointed to command the regiment's 1st Squadron at Fort Des Moines, Iowa and Fort Ethan Allen, Vermont. In 1907 and 1908 he commanded the regiment's 2nd Squadron at Camp Columbia during the First occupation of Cuba. He was promoted to lieutenant colonel in the 5th Cavalry on February 26, 1910, and served with the regiment in Hawaii as commander of the District of Hawaii, the regiment, and the post at Schofield Barracks. He was promoted to colonel on March 11, 1911. Wheeler applied for retirement shortly afterwards, which was approved, and he left the Army on September 24, 1911.

== Career as author ==
Wheeler authored two autobiographical works, 1923's The Frontier Trail and 1925's Buffalo Days. His additional works included: "The Fight on Sappa Creek" (1896) and a five-volume autobiographical manuscript titled Indian and Other Frontier Reminiscences (1929).

1. Book 1: 1845-1870
2. Book 2: 1872-1975 (Cattle Herding and Buffalo Hunting)
3. Book 3: 1875-1877 (Indian Fights and Escorting Sheridan)
4. Book 4: Escort to Lt. Gen. Phillip H. Sheridan, U.S. Army, from Ft. Washakie, Wyoming to Ft. Custer, Montana
5. Book 5: Memoirs of Col. Homer H. Wheeler, U.S. Army

== Family ==
In 1886, Wheeler married Mary Isabel Dougherty of Elizabeth, New Jersey. She died in 1891. Wheeler never remarried, and had no children.

== Death and burial ==
Wheeler died in Los Angeles, California on April 11, 1930. He was buried next to his wife at Evergreen Cemetery in Hillside, New Jersey.
