= Evergreen Cemetery (Hillside, New Jersey) =

Cemetery in Union County, New Jersey, US

- U.S. National Register of Historic Places
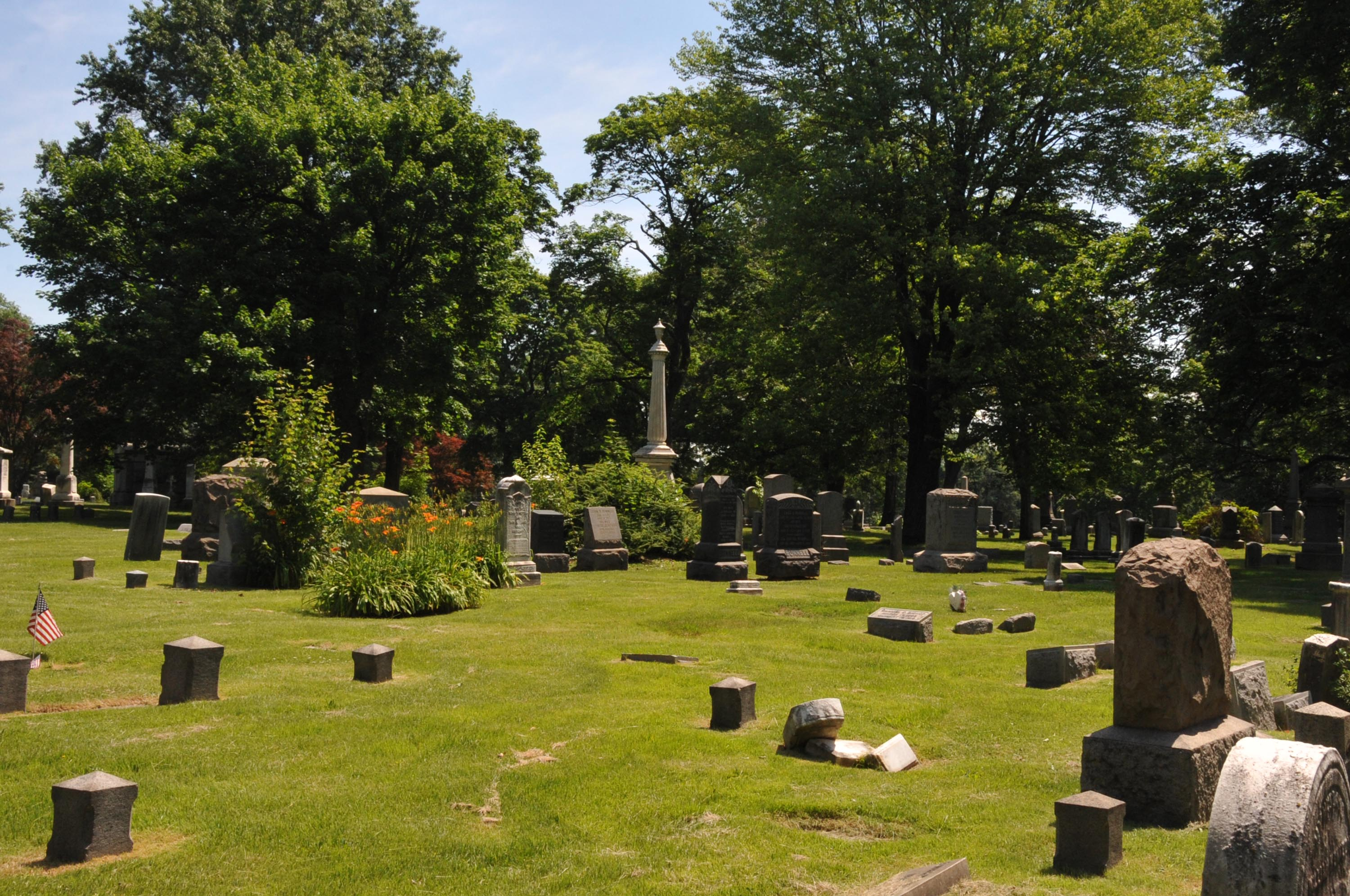

- Location within Union County, New Jersey
- Location: Elizabeth, Hillside and Newark, New Jersey, United States
- Coordinates: 40°41′32″N 74°12′39″W
- Area: 115 acres (47 hectares)
- Architect: Multiple
- Architectural style: Mid-19th-century revival, late-19th- and 20th-century revivals, late Victorian
- NRHP reference No.: 91000882
- Added to NRHP: July 9, 1991 (35 years ago)

Evergreen Cemetery and Crematory is a cemetery and crematorium located at 1137 North Broad Street, Hillside, Union County, New Jersey. Parts of it are in Hillside, Elizabeth, and Newark.

The cemetery is listed on both the New Jersey Register and the National Register of Historic Places, since 1991.

Notable graves include authors Stephen Crane, Mary Mapes Dodge and Edward Stratemeyer. Six former U.S. Congressmen (including one who became Senator) and one non-voting delegate (from Alaska) are buried there as well.

The cemetery also is known for having a section of plots devoted to Romani "gypsy" families.

It is adjacent to Weequahic Golf Course.

King of the Gypsies was filmed there with Shelley Winters.

== Notable interments ==
- James Vote Bomford (1811–1892), Civil War Union Brevet Brigadier General
- William Brant Jr. (1842–1898), Civil War Medal of Honor recipient
- John Brisbin (1818–1880), U.S. Representative from Pennsylvania's 11th congressional district, 1851
- William Chetwood (1771–1857), U.S. Representative from New Jersey at-large, 1836–37
- Adoniram Judson Clark (1838–1913), Civil War Union Army officer
- Amos Clark Jr. (1828–1912), U.S. Representative from New Jersey's 3rd congressional district, 1873–75
- Stephen Crane (1871–1900), author; known for his war novel The Red Badge of Courage (1895)
- Barton Wood Currie (1877–1962), American journalist and author
- Mary Mapes Dodge (1831–1905), author; known for her novel Hans Brinker or the Silver Skates (1865)
- James M. Drake (1837–1913), Civil War Medal of Honor recipient
- George F. Houston (1896–1944), Broadway and Hollywood actor
- Adolphus J. Johnson (1815–1893), Civil War Union Army officer
- Phineas Jones (1819–1884), represented New Jersey's 6th congressional district, 1881–83
- Abraham Kaiser (1852–1912), businessman and politician
- John Kean (1852–1914), U.S. Representative from New Jersey's 3rd congressional district, 1883–85, 1887–89; United States Senator from New Jersey
- Rufus King Jr. (1838–1900), Civil War Medal of Honor recipient
- William J. Magie (1832–1917), Justice of the New Jersey Supreme Court 1880–1900, serving as Chief Justice from 1897 to 1900
- Luther Martin (1827–1863), Civil War Union Army officer
- Edward Stratemeyer (1862–1930), author and creator of The Hardy Boys (1927) and Nancy Drew (1930) book series
- Charles August Sulzer (1879–1919), delegate to U.S. Congress from Alaska Territory, 1917–19
- William Sulzer (1863–1941), Governor of New York in 1913 who was impeached and removed from office later that year
- Homer W. Wheeler (1848–1930), U.S. army officer and author

== See also ==
- List of cemeteries in New Jersey
- List of people from New Jersey
