= Battery B, 1st New Jersey Light Artillery =

- Active: September 3, 1861 to June 16, 1865
- Country: United States
- Allegiance: Union
- Branch: Artillery
- Engagements: Siege of Yorktown; Battle of Williamsburg; Battle of Fair Oaks; Seven Days Battles; Battle of White Oak Swamp; Battle of Malvern Hill; Battle of Fredericksburg; Battle of Chancellorsville; Battle of Gettysburg; Mine Run Campaign; Battle of the Wilderness; Battle of Spotsylvania Court House; Battle of Cold Harbor; Siege of Petersburg; First Battle of Deep Bottom; Battle of Jerusalem Plank Road; Appomattox Campaign; Battle of Sailor's Creek

Battery B, 1st New Jersey Light Artillery was an artillery battery that served in the Union Army during the American Civil War.

== Service ==
The battery was organized at Camp Olden in Trenton, New Jersey and mustered in for a three-year enlistment on September 3, 1861 under the command of Captain John E. Beam.

The battery was attached to Hamilton's Division, Defenses of Washington, to March 1862. Artillery, 3rd Division, III Corps, Army of the Potomac, to June 1862. Artillery Reserve, III Corps, to August 1862. Artillery, 2nd Division, III Corps, to January 1863. Artillery, 1st Division, III Corps, to May 1863. Artillery Brigade, III Corps, to March 1864. 2nd Volunteer Brigade, Artillery Reserve, Army of the Potomac, to May 1864. Artillery Brigade, II Corps, to June 1865.

Battery B, 1st New Jersey Light Artillery mustered out of service June 16, 1865.

== Detailed service ==
Left New Jersey for Washington, D.C., October 22, 1861. Duty in the defenses of Washington, D.C., until March 1862. Ordered to the Virginia Peninsula March 1862. Siege of Yorktown, Va., April 5-May 4. Battle of Williamsburg May 5. Battle of Fair Oaks May 31-June 1. Action at Fair Oaks Station June 21. Seven Days before Richmond June 25-July 1. Battles of Oak Grove, Seven Pines, June 25. Peach Orchard and Savage Station June 29. White Oak Swamp and Glendale June 30. Malvern Hill July 1. At Harrison's Landing until August 16. Moved to Washington, D.C., and duty in the defenses of that city until November. Operations on the Orange and Alexandria Railroad November 10–12. Near Falmouth, Va., November 28-December 11. Battle of Fredericksburg, Va., December 12–15. At Falmouth until April 27, 1863. "Mud March" January 20–24. Operations at Rappahannock Bridge and Grove Church February 5–7. Chancellorsville Campaign April 27-May 6. Battle of Chancellorsville May 1–5. Gettysburg Campaign June 11-July 24. Battle of Gettysburg July 1–3. Pursuit of Lee to Manassas Gap, Va., July 5–24. South Mountain, Md., July 12. Wapping Heights, Manassas Gap, Va., July 23. Near Warrenton, Va., until October. Bristoe Campaign October 9–22. Auburn and Bristoe October 14. Advance to line of the Rappahannock November 7–8. Kelly's Ford November 7. Brandy Station November 8. Mine Run Campaign November 26-December 2. At and near Stevensburg until May 1864. Campaign from the Rapidan to the James May 3-June 15. Battle of the Wilderness May 5–7. Spotsylvania May 8–12. Spotsylvania Court House May 12–21. Assault on the Salient ("Bloody Angle") May 12. Harris Farm (or Fredericksburg Road) May 19. North Anna River May 23–26. On line of the Pamunkey May 26–28. Totopotomoy May 28–31. Cold Harbor June 1–12. Before Petersburg June 16–18. Siege of Petersburg June 16, 1864 to April 2, 1865. Jerusalem Plank Road June 22–23, 1864. Demonstration north of the James River August 13–20. Strawberry Plains August 14–18. Russell's Mills August 18. Ream's Station August 25. Watkins' House March 25. Appomattox Campaign March 28-April 9. Hatcher's Run March 29–31. Boydton Road, Fall of Petersburg, April 2. Sutherland Station April 2. Sailor's Creek April 6, Farmville April 6–7. Appomattox Court House April 9. Surrender of Lee and his army. Moved to Washington, D.C., May. Grand Review of the Armies May 23.

== Casualties ==
The battery lost a total of 32 men during service; 1 officer and 8 enlisted men killed or mortally wounded, 23 enlisted men died of disease.

== Commanders ==
- Captain John E. Beam - killed in action at the Battle of Malvern Hill
- Captain Adoniram Judson Clark
- 1st Lieutenant John B. Monroe - commanded after Cpt Beam was killed in action
- 1st Lieutenant Robert Sims - commanded at the Battle of Chancellorsville

== See also ==
- List of New Jersey Civil War units
- New Jersey in the Civil War
