= William Reading Montgomery =

United States Army officer 1801-1871

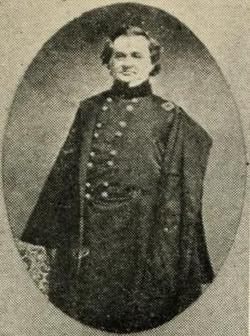
- Portrait of Montgomery
- Born: July 10, 1801; Monmouth County, New Jersey, U.S.
- Died: May 31, 1871 (aged 69); Bristol, Pennsylvania, U.S.
- Burial place: Bristol, Pennsylvania
- Military career
- Allegiance: United States of America
- Branch: United States Army, Union Army
- Service years: 1825–1854; 1861–1864
- Rank: Major, USA; Brigadier General, Union Army
- Commands: 1st Regiment New Jersey Volunteer Infantry; Military Governor of Alexandria, Virginia; Annapolis, Maryland; Philadelphia, Pennsylvania
- Conflicts: Second Seminole War; Mexican–American War; Battle of Palo Alto; Battle of Resaca de la Palma; Battle of Cerro Gordo; Battle of Contreras; Battle of Churubusco; Battle of Molino del Rey; Battle of Chapultepec; Battle for Mexico City; American Civil War

William Reading Montgomery (July 10, 1801 – May 31, 1871) was a career United States Army officer who served in the Second Seminole War and Mexican–American War. He was a brigadier general in the Union Army from May 17, 1861, to April 4, 1864, during the American Civil War.

Montgomery received a brevet appointment as major for gallant and meritorious conduct during his service as captain of the 8th United States Infantry Regiment at the Battle of Palo Alto and the Battle of Resaca de la Palma, where he was wounded, and a brevet appointment as lieutenant colonel for gallant and meritorious service with the 8th U.S. Infantry Regiment at the Battle of Molino del Rey, where he also was wounded.

Montgomery was promoted to the full, substantive rank of major in 1852 after which he served on recruiting and garrison duty. Montgomery was dismissed from the U.S. Army in 1855 due to unauthorized real estate transactions, the supposed appropriation of part of the military reserve land at Fort Riley, Kansas, for the use of the Pawnee Association as a town when he "had an interest" in that association. Historian Ezra J. Warner states that Montgomery's dismissal from the service for this reason may have been procured by the pro-slavery faction in Kansas because of Montgomery's Free State views. Historian Stewart Sifakis supports Warner's view and states that the appropriated government land "was for a townsite that was apparently planned as a free-soil community."

At the beginning of the American Civil War, Montgomery organized and was briefly colonel of the 1st Regiment New Jersey Volunteer Infantry. The 1st New Jersey Volunteer Regiment was "held in reserve" at the First Battle of Bull Run on July 21, 1861, according to Wilson and Fiske. Sifakis states that Montgomery's regiment was detailed to guard areas around Arlington Heights, Virginia, and Fairfax Court House, Virginia. Cullum also supports this view by stating that Montgomery first served in the defenses of Washington, D.C. at the start of the war.

Soon after the Battle of First Bull Run, Montgomery was appointed a brigadier general of volunteers to rank from May 17, 1861. Thereafter, he served in administrative positions or was awaiting orders. He was military governor of Alexandria, Virginia, from September to December, 1861; in command of Annapolis, Maryland, from January 1862 to March 17, 1862, and at Philadelphia, Pennsylvania, from April 4, 1862, to March 2, 1863; awaiting orders at Cairo, Illinois, from March to October 1863; on a military commission at Memphis, Tennessee, October 16, 1863, to March 15, 1864; and on leave of absence from March 15 to April 4, 1864. Montgomery submitted his resignation from the Union Army, which according to Warner was presumably due to ill health, on April 4, 1864. After his resignation was accepted on April 4, 1864, Montgomery briefly dealt in wood moldings at Philadelphia, Pennsylvania. He then retired to Bristol, Pennsylvania, where he died on May 31, 1871.

== Early life ==
William Reading Montgomery was born in Monmouth County, New Jersey, on July 10, 1801. He graduated from the United States Military Academy at West Point, New York, in 1825. He ranked 28th in a class of 37 cadets. Upon graduation from the U.S. Military Academy on July 1, 1825, Montgomery was appointed brevet second lieutenant in the 3rd United States Infantry Regiment and second lieutenant on the same day.

Montgomery served first at Fort Howard, Wisconsin, in 1826; then at Jefferson Barracks Military Post Missouri in 1826‑27; on frontier duty at Fort Leavenworth, Kansas in 1827‑28, and again at Jefferson Barracks in 1829‑30. Montgomery performed the duties of disbursing officer during the removal of the Choctaw Native Americans from Mississippi to their reservation in Oklahoma in 1830-31 as well as on commissary duty subsisting the Choctaw in 1832-33. Between these two duties he served at Fort Jesup, Louisiana, in 1831‑32 and on recruiting service in 1832.

Montgomery was promoted to first lieutenant on August 31, 1833. He then served on frontier duty at Fort Jesup in 1833-35, on recruiting service in 1835‑37; again on frontier duty at Fort Jesup in 1837‑38 and on Recruiting service in 1838. During a period of border disturbances Montgomery served at posts along the Canada–United States border at Swanton, Vermont, in 1838 and at Madison Barracks, Sackett's Harbor, New York, later in 1838. Montgomery was promoted to captain in the 8th United States Infantry Regiment on July 7, 1838. He served at Fort Covington, New York, in 1838‑39, at Ogdensburg, New York, in 1839, on recruiting service in 1839‑40; again in garrison at Sackett's Harbor, New York in 1840 and at Jefferson Barracks, Missouri in 1840.

Montgomery served in the Second Seminole War from 1840 to 1842. After the Second Seminole War, he served in the garrison at Fort Brooke, Florida, in 1843-45 and in the military occupation of Texas in 1845-46.

== Mexican–American War ==
Montgomery fought in the Mexican–American War from 1846 to 1848 as a captain of the 8th United States Infantry Regiment. He was engaged in the Battle of Palo Alto on May 8, 1846, and the Battle of Resaca de la Palma, May 9, 1846, where he was wounded. Montgomery was appointed brevet major for gallant and meritorious conduct at the Battles of Palo Alto and Resaca de la Palma. He then served on recruiting service in 1846‑47.

Montgomery returned to his regiment in Mexico in 1847‑48 and was engaged in the Battle of Cerro Gordo, April 17‑18, 1847, the capture of San Antonio after the Battle of Contreras, August 20, 1847, the Battle of Churubusco, August 20, 1847, and the Battle of Molino del Rey, September 8, 1847, where he was wounded in the assault on the Mexican works and for which he was appointed brevet lieutenant colonel. He nonetheless served in the Battle of Chapultepec on September 13, 1847 and the Battle for Mexico City, resulting in the capture of Mexico City on September 13‑14, 1847.

Montgomery became eligible for membership in the Aztec Club of 1847, but is not listed as among the original members. The club was founded as a military society of officers who were serving with the United States Army at Mexico City after its capture during the Mexican–American War. In 1871, eligibility for membership was extended to all U.S. Army and U.S. Navy (including U.S. Marine Corps) officers who served in Mexico or in Mexican waters during the war or their male descendants. Montgomery is listed on the Aztec Club web site as a qualifying Mexican War officer for membership of descendants in the Aztec Club.

== Assignments: 1848–1855 ==
After the Mexican–American War, Montgomery was assigned to garrison duty at Jefferson Barracks, Missouri in 1848‑49; on frontier duty at Austin, Texas, in 1849 and at Camp Gates, later Fort Gates Texas in 1849-50. Montgomery founded Fort Gates as Camp Gates, with two companies of the 8th United States Infantry Regiment, about 5 miles east of current Gatesville, Texas, on October 26, 1849. He served on recruiting service in 1850‑53. Montgomery was promoted to major on December 7, 1852.

Montgomery returned to frontier duty at Fort Chadbourne, Texas in 1853; was again on recruiting service in 1853‑54; served in the garrison at Jefferson Barracks, Missouri in 1854; and on frontier duty at Fort Riley, Kansas, in 1854 and 1855, at Fort Leavenworth, Kansas, 1855, at Fort Pierre, Dakota in 1855 and at Fort Leavenworth, Kansas 1855.

While on duty at Fort Riley, Montgomery's anti-slavery Free State views aggravated the pro-slavery faction in the area in 1855. Montgomery was dismissed from the U.S. Army in 1855 due to his apparent appropriation of part of the military reserve land at Fort Riley, Kansas for the use of the Pawnee Association as a town when he had an interest in that association. At least one source, historian Ezra J. Warner, states that Montgomery's dismissal for this reason may have been procured by the pro-slavery faction because of his Free State views. Historian Stewart Sifakis agrees with Warner's possible reason for Montgomery's dismissal. Montgomery's biographical sketch by Wilson and Fiske, 1888, page 372, states that Montgomery acted with strict neutrality despite his free state opinions "but his actions failed to meet with the approval of his superiors." Eicher, page 394 simply states that Montgomery was dismissed from the army on December 8, 1855, for "unauthorized real estate transactions at Fort Riley, Kansas" and Heitman, page 720 simply states that he was dismissed on that date. Historian Christopher Phillips has offered the fullest treatment of Montgomery's entanglement in the Pawnee Association, arguing against slavery politics as a precipitant for Montgomery's court martial. Rather, it stemmed from a personal dispute with an antislavery subordinate officer, Nathaniel Lyon. Eicher only states that Montgomery moved to New Jersey after his dismissal from the U.S. Army.

== American Civil War ==
At the outset of the American Civil War, Montgomery organized and briefly was colonel of the 1st Regiment New Jersey Volunteer Infantry. The regiment was held in reserve at the First Battle of Bull Run. Montgomery's biographical sketch in Appletons' Cyclopaedia of American Biography (1888) states that Montgomery's regiment "aided in covering [the Union Army's] retreat from Bull Run." Sifakis, on the other hand, states that the regiment was detailed to guard areas around Arlington Heights, Virginia and Fairfax Court House, Virginia. In June 1861, near Trenton, New Jersey, Montgomery suffered rib injuries when his horse fell.

Soon after the Battle of First Bull Run, Montgomery was appointed a brigadier general of volunteers to rank from May 17, 1861. Thereafter, he served in administrative positions or was awaiting orders. Montgomery was military governor of Alexandria, Virginia, September–December 1861, in command at Annapolis, Maryland, January 1862 to March 17, 1862, in command at Philadelphia, Pennsylvania, April 4, 1862, to March 2, 1863; awaiting orders at Cairo, Illinois, March to October 1863 and on a military commission at Memphis, Tennessee from October 16, 1863, to March 15, 1864.

Montgomery was on leave of absence from March 15 to April 4, 1864. He submitted his resignation from the Union Army, presumably due to ill health according to Warner, which was accepted on April 4. 1864.

== Later life ==
After his service in the Union Army, Montgomery moved to Philadelphia, Pennsylvania and briefly worked as a merchant in dealing wood moldings. He then retired to his home in Bristol, Pennsylvania.

== Death ==
Montgomery died at Bristol, Pennsylvania, on May 31, 1871, at aged 69.

He is buried at Church of St. James the Greater Cemetery at Bristol, Pennsylvania.

== See also ==
- List of American Civil War generals (Union)
