= James M. Drake =

American newspaper publisher and soldier (1837-1913)

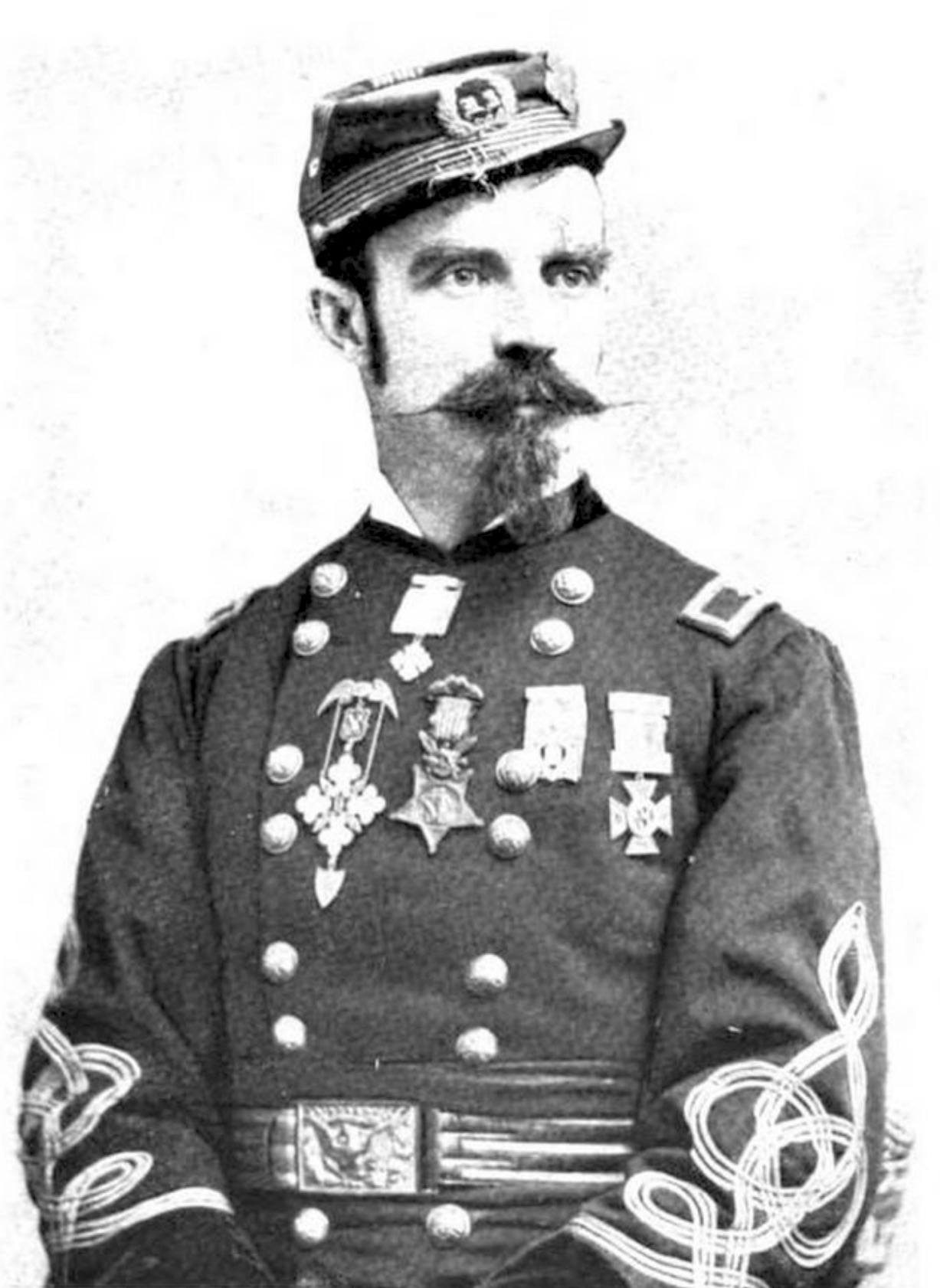
- Born: March 25, 1837; Washington Valley, New Jersey
- Died: November 28, 1913 (aged 76); Elizabeth, New Jersey
- Burial place: Evergreen Cemetery
- Military career
- Allegiance: United States of America
- Branch: United States Army; New Jersey National Guard
- Rank: Second Lieutenant (Army); Colonel (National Guard))
- Unit: 9th New Jersey Volunteer Infantry - Company D
- Conflicts: Battle of Port Walthall Junction
- Awards: Medal of Honor

Signature
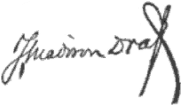

James Madison Drake (March 25, 1837, to November 28, 1913) was an American newspaper publisher who fought in the American Civil War. Drake received the country's highest award for bravery during combat, the Medal of Honor, for his action during the Battle of Port Walthall Junction in Virginia on May 6, 1864. He was honored with the award on March 3, 1873.

== Biography ==
Drake was born in the Washington Valley near Washington Rock in Somerset County, New Jersey, on March 25, 1837.

In 1853, he began publishing the Trenton, New Jersey Mercer Standard, which continued until 1854; in 1857, he launched the Evening News, and in 1860, he launched Wide Awake. Later that year he served on the city council as an alderman, remaining in that position until July 1861, at which point he joined the 9th New Jersey Infantry. After the war, he served in the New Jersey National Guard, rising to the rank of Colonel. He also worked as a newspaper publisher in Elizabeth, New Jersey, where he managed the production of the Daily Monitor from 1868 to 1881, the Elizabeth Sunday Leader from 1882 to 1887, and the Elizabeth Daily Leader from 1887 to 1900.

Drake died on November 28, 1913, and his remains are interred at the Evergreen Cemetery in Hillside, New Jersey.

== Medal of Honor citation ==
Commanded the skirmish line in the advance and held his position all day and during the night.

== See also ==
- List of American Civil War Medal of Honor recipients: A–F
