= Banket =

Banket may refer to:

- Banket (band), a Slovak band
- Banket (food), a Dutch almond dessert pastry
- Banket (mining term), a South African mining term
- Banket, Zimbabwe, a small town in Zimbabwe

== See also ==
- Banquet (disambiguation)
- Blanket
