= William Brant =

- Born: 1840; Elizabeth, New Jersey
- Died: March 2, 1898 (aged 57–58); New Jersey
- Burial place: Evergreen Cemetery, Hillside
- Military career
- Allegiance: United States of America
- Branch: United States Army
- Service years: 1861 - 1865
- Rank: Captain
- Unit: 1st Regiment New Jersey Volunteer Infantry - Company B
- Conflicts: Third Battle of Petersburg
- Awards: Medal of Honor

William Brant, Jr. (1840 – March 2, 1898) was an American soldier who fought in the American Civil War. Brant received the country's highest award for bravery during combat, the Medal of Honor, for his action at Petersburg, Virginia on 3 April 1865. He was honored with the award on 10 May 1865.

Brant joined the 1st New Jersey Volunteer Infantry in May 1861, and was commissioned as an officer in February 1865. He mustered out with his regiment in June 1865.

== Medal of Honor citation ==
Capture of battle flag of 46th North Carolina (C.S.A.).

== See also ==
- List of American Civil War Medal of Honor recipients: A–F
