= Camille Baquet =

American Civil War Union Army officer

- Born: Camille Archibald Baquet; 1842; Paterson, New Jersey, U.S.
- Died: November 28, 1924 (aged 81–82); New Brunswick, New Jersey, U.S.
- Burial place: Saint Peter's Church Cemetery
- Military career
- Allegiance: United States
- Branch: Union Army
- Rank: Second lieutenant
- Unit: 16th Pennsylvania Cavalry Regiment
- Commands: Company A, 1st New Jersey Volunteer Infantry
- Conflicts: American Civil War: Battle of Chancellorsville; Battle of Gettysburg; Wilderness; Battle of Spotsylvania Court House; Cold Harbor

Camille Archibald Baquet (1842 – November 28, 1924) was an American Civil War Union Army officer who served in the 1st New Jersey Volunteer Infantry regiment and was the author of the first history of the unit's brigade, the famed First New Jersey Brigade.

== Biography ==
Baquet was born in Paterson, New Jersey, one of eight children born to Camille Baquet (or Baquett), a law professor and translator from Paris, and Harriet Stuart Lord, the daughter of English immigrants. He grew up in Burlington, New Jersey. He was mustered in as a private in Company I, 16th Pennsylvania Volunteer Cavalry on September 13, 1862. He served with the Pennsylvanians until April 1, 1863, when he was commissioned as a second lieutenant in Company A, 1st New Jersey Volunteer Infantry, filling an officer vacancy within the Company that had existed for over a month. He then served until June 23, 1864, when his enlistment expired by law, and he was honorably mustered out of Federal service. During his 14-month tenure with the 1st New Jersey, his regiment saw combat at the Battles of Chancellorsville, Gettysburg, the Wilderness, Spotsylvania, and Cold Harbor.

He later worked as a bookkeeper. In 1910, he published the work History of the First Brigade, New Jersey Volunteers (Kearny's First New Jersey Brigade) from 1861 to 1865, which chronicled the military history of his brigade. Until the year 2005, it was the only full-length work on that famed VI Corps unit.

He died in New Brunswick, New Jersey and was buried in the Saint Peter's Church Cemetery in Spotswood, New Jersey.
