= Mark Wilkes Collet =

Mark Wilkes Collet (June 2, 1826 – May 3, 1863) was a Union Army officer who served during the American Civil War. He served as Colonel and commander of the 1st New Jersey Volunteer Infantry regiment, a unit he led from the Second Battle of Bull Run until the Chancellorsville campaign. He was killed during his regiment's participation in the May 3, 1863, Battle of Salem Church during the campaign.

His remains were taken to Philadelphia, Pennsylvania, where they were buried in the churchyard of the Church of St. James the Less.
