= Jeff. Davis Legion =

Cavalry regiment of the Confederate States Army

- Active: 1861–1865
- Disbanded: April 26, 1865
- Country: Confederate States
- Allegiance: Mississippi
- Branch: Army
- Type: Cavalry
- Size: Regiment
- Facings: Yellow
- Engagements: American Civil War; Siege of Yorktown; Battle of Williamsburg; Seven Days Battles; Battle of Sharpsburg; Battle of Brandy Station; Battle of Upperville; Battle of Gettysburg; Battle of the Wilderness; Battle of Spotsylvania Court House; Battle of North Anna; Battle of Cold Harbor; Siege of Petersburg; Battle of Nance’s Shop; Battle of Bentonville

The Jeff. Davis Legion (also known as the Jeff Davis Legion, Mississippi Cavalry) was a cavalry regiment of the Confederate States Army. Made up of companies from Mississippi, Alabama, and Georgia; it fought primarily in the Eastern Theater of the American Civil War. In 1865, it was reassigned to the Army of Tennessee, surrendering at Greensboro, N.C.

== Formation ==
The Jeff. Davis Legion was organized as the 2d Battalion, Mississippi Cavalry, consisting of five companies on October 24, 1861, at Camp Cooper, Virginia. Company A, from Mississippi, was mustered for the war. Companies B and C, from Mississippi, were mustered for 12 months. Company D, from Alabama, was mustered for 12 months and Company E, from Alabama, mustered for the war. In December 1861, Company F, from Georgia, was attached to the battalion by order of the Secretary of War, when Major William T. Martin was promoted to the rank of lieutenant colonel. A portion of the battalion (the 12 month companies) were reorganized under Act of Congress on May 23, 1862. The war companies retained their existing organization. The election was held for field officers in accordance with instructions from the Secretary resulting in the election of the existing field officers. The unit retained this organization until July 11, 1864, when three companies of Love's Battalion, Alabama Cavalry, and one company of the 20th Battalion, Georgia Cavalry, were attached to the unit increasing it to a regiment with one colonel and two majors.

== History ==
Led by Lieutenant-Colonel Martin, the Jeff. Davis Legion joined what would eventually become the Cavalry Corps of the Army of Northern Virginia. It fought in the Battle of Williamsburg on May 5, 1862; doing surveillance of Union movements and gaining knowledge of their dispositions. Reporting to Brigadier-General Jeb Stuart, the report led to a flank maneuver around Major-General George B. McClellan's army, in which two squadrons of the Legion participated. Later, Stuart wrote that the unit had performed extremely well and helped him greatly.

During the Seven Days Battles the Legion was ordered to across the Chickahominy. They took control of the South Anna, screening the crossing of Thomas J. Jackson and his troops. After Jackson crossed, it went north and fought against the 42nd New York Infantry. It dislodged the Union from the position and took 3 prisoners. On September 5, during the Maryland campaign, Wade Hampton's brigade crossed the Potomac in order to retake a battery captured by the Union. The Legion operated as rear guard and covered the mountain gap while the rest of the brigade followed Robert E. Lee's army to Middleton; and at daylight of September 13 the Legion was attacked by the pursuing Union forces. It held off the Union troops until it had to give way, buying the Confederates valuable time. "Martin and his men fought with their accustomed gallantry," was Hampton's report.

When Martin was promoted and transferred in 1863, command of the Legion developed on Lieutenant-Colonel J. Fred. Waring. The composition of the unit changed several times during the war and in March 1864 it was augmented into a full regiment of 10 companies. When Hampton went to South Carolina, the Legion, its brigade now led by Pierce M.B. Young, accompanied him. Serving as part of the Army of Tennessee it fought in the Carolinas and surrendered with the rest of General Joseph E. Johnston's forces in April 1865.

== Regimental order of battle ==
Units of the Jeff. Davis Legion included:

- Company A (Natchez Cavalry), Adams County, Mississippi
- Company B (Chickasaw Rangers), Chickasaw County, Mississippi
- Company C (Southern Guards), Kemper County, Mississippi
- Company D (Sumter Mounted Guards), Alabama
- Company E (Canebrake Legion), Marengo County, Alabama
- Company F (Georgia Hussars or Dixie Cavaliers), Chatham County, Georgia
- Company G (Liberty Mounted Rangers), Liberty County, Georgia
- Company H (Morehead Rangers), Alabama
- Company I, Alabama
- Company K, Alabama

== See also ==
- List of American Civil War legions
- List of Mississippi Civil War Confederate units
