= Banquet (disambiguation) =

A banquet is a large public meal or feast.

Banquet or The Banquet may also refer to:

== Film and television ==
- The Banquet (1991 film), a film made to benefit the Hong Kong flood relief charity
- The Banquet (2006 film), a Chinese film by Feng Xiaogang
- The Banquet (2026 film), a Canadian film by Gloria Ui Young Kim
- Le Banquet, a 2008 Canadian drama film
- A Banquet, a 2021 British horror film
- "The Banquet" (Parks and Recreation), a 2009 television episode

== Music ==
- Banquet (album), by Lucifer's Friend, 1974
- "Banquet"/"Staying Fat", a 2004 double A-side single by Bloc Party
  - "Banquet" (song), a 2005 re-release
- "Banquet", a 1972 song by Joni Mitchell from For the Roses
- Banquet Records, a shop and record label in London, England

== People with the surname ==
- David Banquet (born 1974), French rugby union player
- Frédéric Banquet (born 1976), French rugby league and union player

== Other uses ==
- Banquet 400, now the Hollywood Casino 400, a NASCAR race at Kansas Speedway
- Banquet Foods, an American brand of frozen foods
- Coors Banquet, a brand of Molson Coors beer
- Operation Banquet, a British World War II defensive plan
- Operation Banquet (Padang), a 1944 British World War II naval operation in the Southeast Pacific
- "Banquet", a 2017 TV advertisement for Bud Light that introduced the catchphrase "Dilly Dilly"
- The Banquet, a 1754 painting by William Hogarth
- The Banquet, a 1958 painting by René Magritte

== See also ==
- Banket (disambiguation)
- Banquete, Texas
- Banquette, a footpath along the inside of a rampart or parapet
