= 1st New Jersey Infantry Regiment =

- Active: May 21, 1861 to June 29, 1865
- Disbanded: June 29, 1865
- Country: United States
- Allegiance: Union
- Branch: United States Army; Union Army
- Type: Infantry
- Part of: First New Jersey Brigade, 1st Division, VI Corps
- Engagements: First Battle of Bull Run; Battle of Gaines's Mill; Second Battle of Bull Run; Battle of Antietam; Battle of Fredericksburg; Battle of Gettysburg; Battle of the Wilderness; Battle of Spotsylvania Court House; Battle of Cold Harbor; Battle of Cedar Creek

Commanders
- Notable commanders: Alfred T.A. Torbert; Mark Wilkes Collet

The 1st New Jersey Infantry Regiment was an American Civil War Union Army regiment of infantry from New Jersey that served in the Army of the Potomac.

== History ==
1st New Jersey Infantry Regiment was recruited and mustered into Federal service in May 1861, and was brigaded with the 2nd New Jersey Volunteer Infantry, 3rd New Jersey Volunteer Infantry, and the 4th New Jersey Volunteer Infantry to make up what became famed as the "First New Jersey Brigade".

The regiment and brigade served as the 1st Brigade of the 1st Division of the VI Corps, and participated in numerous battles from the June 27, 1862, Battle of Gaines's Mill, Virginia, to the final Union assaults on Confederate positions at Petersburg, Virginia, in April 1865.

The remnants of the regiment were mustered out in June 1865.

== Notable members ==
Notable members of the 1st New Jersey were:

- Colonel William Reading Montgomery - first commander and later Brigadier General of Volunteers
- Colonel Alfred Thomas Archimedes Torbert - later promoted to brigadier general and commanded the regiment's brigade.
- Colonel Mark Wilkes Collet - led the regiment at the Battle of Fredericksburg and the Battle of Chancellorsville, where he was killed in action.
- Lieutenant Colonel Robert McAllister - later Colonel of the 11th New Jersey Volunteer Infantry, II Corps brigade commander, and Brevet Major General of Volunteers.
- Captain William Birney - later promoted to brigadier general of volunteers
- Captain William Brant - Medal of Honor Recipient
- Corporal Charles Ferren Hopkins - Medal of Honor Recipient
- Lieutenant and Adjutant Peter Dumont Vroom, Jr. - son of a former Governor of New Jersey, and later brigadier general in the United States Regular Army.
- 2nd Lieutenant Camille Baquet - author of "History of the First Brigade, New Jersey Volunteers (Kearny's First New Jersey Brigade) from 1861 to 1865", a history of the brigade published in 1910.

== Casualties ==
The 1st New Jersey lost 244 men during their service. 153 men were killed in battle or died of wounds, 91 men died of disease and other causes.

== See also ==
- List of New Jersey Civil War Units
- 1st New Jersey Regiment - Revolutionary War unit
