= Bristoe campaign order of battle: Union =

The following units and commanders fought in the Bristoe campaign of the American Civil War on the Union side. The Confederate order of battle is shown separately. When multiple names of commanders are shown, this indicates the succession of command through the Campaign.

== Military rank abbreviations used ==
- MG = Major General
- BG = Brigadier General
- Col = Colonel
- Ltc = Lieutenant Colonel
- Maj = Major
- Cpt = Captain
- Lt = Lieutenant

== Army of the Potomac ==
MG George G. Meade, Commanding

=== General Staff and Headquarters ===
General Staff and Headquarters

- Chief of Staff: MG Andrew A. Humphreys
- Chief of Artillery: BG Henry J. Hunt
- Assistant Adjutant General: BG Seth Williams
- Chief Quartermaster: BG Rufus Ingalls
- Provost Marshal General: BG Marsena R. Patrick
  - 80th New York (20th Militia): Ltc Jacob B. Hardenbergh
  - 93rd New York: Ltc Benjamin C. Butler
  - 2nd Pennsylvania Cavalry: Ltc Joseph B. Printon
  - 6th Pennsylvania Cavalry (detachment)
  - Detachments Regular Cavalry and Volunteer Cavalry
- Engineer Brigade: BG Henry W. Benham
  - 15th New York (battalion): Capt Joseph Wood Jr.
  - 50th New York: Col William H. Pettes
  - U.S. Battalion: Capt George H. Mendell
- Guards and Orderlies
  - Oneida (New York) Cavalry: Capt Daniel P. Mann
- Signal Corps: Capt Lemuel B. Norton

=== I Corps ===
- MG John Newton
- Escort: 4th and 16th Pennsylvania Cavalry (detachments)

Division	Brigade	Regiments and others
First Division: BG Lysander Cutler	1st Brigade ("Iron Brigade"): Col William W. Robinson	19th Indiana: Col Samuel J. Williams; 24th Michigan: Col Henry A. Morrow; 1st New York Sharpshooters (battalion): Cpt Joseph C. Arnold; 2nd Wisconsin: Ltc John Mansfield; 6th Wisconsin: Col Edward S. Bragg; 7th Wisconsin: Maj Mark Finnicum
First Division: BG Lysander Cutler	2nd Brigade: BG James C. Rice	7th Indiana: Col Ira G. Grover; 76th New York: Maj John W. Young; 84th New York ("14th Brooklyn Militia"): Col Edward B. Fowler; 95th New York: Maj Edward Pye; 147th New York: Maj George Harney; 56th Pennsylvania: Ltc George B. Osborn
Second Division: BG John C. Robinson	1st Brigade: Col Thomas F. McCoy	16th Maine: Ltc Charles W. Tilden; 13th Massachusetts: Col Samuel H. Leonard; 39th Massachusetts: Col Phineas Stearns Davis; 94th New York: Maj Samuel A. Moffett; 104th New York: Col Gilbert G. Prey; 107th Pennsylvania: Maj Henry J. Shaefer
Second Division: BG John C. Robinson	2nd Brigade: BG Henry Baxter	12th Massachusetts: Maj Benjamin F. Cook; 83rd New York (9th Militia): Col Joseph A. Moesch; 97th New York: Maj Charles Northrup; 11th Pennsylvania: Col Richard Coulter; 88th Pennsylvania: Cpt Edmund Y. Patterson; 90th Pennsylvania: Ltc William A. Leech
Third Division: BG John R. Kenly	1st Brigade: Col Chapman Biddle	121st Pennsylvania: Ltc Alexander Biddle; 142nd Pennsylvania: Ltc Alfred. B. McCalmont
Third Division: BG John R. Kenly	2nd Brigade: Col Langhorne Wister	143rd Pennsylvania: Col Edmund L. Dana; 149th Pennsylvania: Ltc Walton Dwight; 150th Pennsylvania: Cpt Horatio Bell
Third Division: BG John R. Kenly	3rd Brigade: Col Nathan T. Dushane	1st Maryland: Ltc John W. Wilson; 4th Maryland: Col Richard N. Bowerman; 7th Maryland: Col Edwin H. Webster; 8th Maryland: Col Andrew W. Denison
	Artillery Brigade: Col Charles S. Wainwright	2nd Maine Light: Cpt James A. Hall; 5th Maine Light: Cpt Greenlief T. Stevens; 1st New York Light, Battery E & Battery L: Cpt Gilbert H. Reynolds; 1st Pennsylvania Light, Battery B: Cpt James H. Cooper; 4th US, Battery B: Lt James Stewart

=== II Corps ===
- MG Gouverneur K. Warren (temporarily absent; returned October 12)
- BG John C. Caldwell
- Escort:
  - 10th New York Cavalry, Company M: Lt James Matthews
  - 13th Pennsylvania Cavalry, Company G: Lt Robert Brown

Division	Brigade	Regiments and others
First Division: BG John C. Caldwell; Col Paul A. Frank	1st Brigade: Col Nelson A. Miles	61st New York: Ltc K. Oscar Broady; 81st Pennsylvania: Col H. Boyd McKeen; 140th Pennsylvania: Col John Fraser
First Division: BG John C. Caldwell; Col Paul A. Frank	2nd Brigade ("Irish Brigade"): Col Patrick Kelly	28th Massachusetts: Col Richard Byrnes; 63rd New York: Capt Thomas Touhy; 69th New York: Cpt Richard Moroney; 88th New York: Cpt Denis F. Burke; 116th Pennsylvania: Cpt Seneca G. Willauer
First Division: BG John C. Caldwell; Col Paul A. Frank	3rd Brigade: Col Paul A. Frank; Col James A. Beaver	52nd New York: Ltc Charles G. Freudenberg; 57th New York: Ltc Alford B. Chapman; 66th New York: Ltc John S. Hammell; 148th Pennsylvania: Col James A. Beaver, Maj George A. Fairlamb
First Division: BG John C. Caldwell; Col Paul A. Frank	4th Brigade: Col John R. Brooke	2nd Delaware: Ltc David L. Stricker; 64th New York: Maj Leman W. Bradley; 53rd Pennsylvania: Capt Henry S. Dimm; 145th Pennsylvania: Col Hiram L. Brown
Second Division: BG Alexander S. Webb	1st Brigade: Col Francis E. Heath	19th Maine: Ltc Henry W. Cunningham; 15th Massachusetts: Ltc George C. Joslin; 1st Minnesota: Maj Mark W. Downie; 82nd New York (2nd Militia): Maj Thomas W. Baird
Second Division: BG Alexander S. Webb	2nd Brigade "Philadelphia Brigade": Col De Witt C. Baxter	69th Pennsylvania: Maj James Duffie; 71st Pennsylvania: Col Richard PennSmith; 72nd Pennsylvania: Ltc Theodore Hesser; 106th Pennsylvania: Ltc William L. Curry
Second Division: BG Alexander S. Webb	3rd Brigade: Col James E. Mallon (k)	19th Massachusetts: Ltc Ansel D. Wass; 20th Massachusetts: Maj Henry L. Abbott; 7th Michigan: Maj Sylvanus W. Curtis; 42nd New York: Cpt Robert C. Wright; 59th New York: Cpt Horace P. Rugg
Third Division: BG Alexander Hays	1st Brigade ("Gibraltar Brigade"): Col Samuel S. Carroll	14th Indiana: Col John Coons; 4th Ohio: Maj Gordon A. Stewart; 8th Ohio: Ltc Franklin Sawyer; 7th West Virginia (battalion): Ltc Jonathan H. Lockwood
Third Division: BG Alexander Hays	2nd Brigade: Col Thomas A. Smyth	14th Connecticut: Col Theodore G. Ellis; 1st Delaware: Ltc Edward P. Harris; 12th New Jersey: Col J. Howard Willets; 10th New York (battalion): Maj George F. Hopper; 108th New York: Col Charles J. Powers
Third Division: BG Alexander Hays	3rd Brigade: BG Joshua T. Owen	39th New York: Maj Hugo Hildebrandt; 111th New York: Col Clinton D. MacDougall; 125th New York: Col Levin Crandell; 126th New York: Col James M. Bull
	Artillery Brigade: Cpt John G. Hazard	1st New York Light, Battery G: Cpt Nelson Ames; 1st Ohio Light, Battery H: Cpt James F. Huntington; 1st Pennsylvania Light, Batteries F and G: Cpt R. Bruce Ricketts; 1st Rhode Island Light, Battery A: Cpt William A. Arnold; 1st Rhode Island Light, Battery B: Cpt Thomas Frederick Brown; 1st US Light, Battery I: Lt Frank L. French

=== III Corps ===
- MG William H. French

Division	Brigade	Regiments and others
First Division: MG David B. Birney	1st Brigade: Col Charles H. T. Collis	57th Pennsylvania: Col Peter Sides; 63rd Pennsylvania: Maj John A. Danks; 68th Pennsylvania: Col Andrew H. Tippin; 105th Pennsylvania: Col Calvin A. Craig; 114th Pennsylvania: Maj Edward R. Bowen; 141st Pennsylvania: Cpt Edwin A. Spaulding
First Division: MG David B. Birney	2nd Brigade: BG John Henry Hobart Ward	3rd Maine: Col Moses B. Lakeman; 4th Maine: Col Elijah Walker, 86th New York: Maj Michael B. Stafford; 124th New York: Ltc Francis M. Cummins; 99th Pennsylvania: Ltc Edwin Ruthwin Biles; 2nd US Sharpshooters: Ltc Homer R. Stoughton
First Division: MG David B. Birney	3rd Brigade: Col P. Régis de Trobriand	17th Maine: Ltc Charles B. Merrill; 3rd Michigan: Col Byron R. Pierce; 5th Michigan: Ltc John Pulford; 40th New York: Col Thomas W. Egan; 110th Pennsylvania: Maj Isaac Rogers; 1st US Sharpshooters: Ltc Casper Trepp
Second Division: BG Henry Prince	1st Brigade: Col Robert McAllister	11th Massachusetts: Ltc Porter D. Tripp; 16th Massachusetts: Ltc Waldo Merriam; 11th New Jersey: Ltc John Schoonover; 26th Pennsylvania: Maj Robert L. Bodine; 84th Pennsylvania: Ltc Milton Opp
Second Division: BG Henry Prince	2nd Brigade ("Excelsior Brigade"): Col William R. Brewster	70th New York: Col J. Egbert Farnum; 71st New York: Maj Thomas Rafferty; 72nd New York: Ltc John Leonard; 73rd New York: Ltc Michael W. Burns; 74th New York: Maj Henry M. Alles; 120th New York: Cpt Abram L. Lockwood
Second Division: BG Henry Prince	3rd Brigade: BG Gershom Mott	5th New Jersey: Col William J. Sewell; 6th New Jersey: Col George C. Burling; 7th New Jersey: Maj Frederick Cooper; 8th New Jersey: Col John Ramsey; 115th Pennsylvania: Ltc John P. Dunne
Third Division: BG Joseph B. Carr	1st Brigade: BG William H. Morris	14th New Jersey: Col William Snyder Truex; 151st New York: Ltc Erwin A. Bowen; 10th Vermont: Col Albert B. Jewett
Third Division: BG Joseph B. Carr	2nd Brigade: Col Joseph Warren Keifer	6th Maryland: Col John Watt Horn; 110th Ohio: Maj Otho H. Binkley; 122d Ohio: Col William H. Ball; 138th Pennsylvania: Col Matthew R. McClennan
Third Division: BG Joseph B. Carr	3rd Brigade: Col Benjamin F. Smith	106th New York: Maj Andrew N. McDonald; 126th Ohio: Ltc William H. Harlan; 67th Pennsylvania: Cpt Samuel Barry; 87th Pennsylvania: Col John W. Schall
	Artillery Brigade: Cpt George E. Randolph	4th Battery Maine Light: Cpt O'Neil W. Robinson Jr.; 10th Massachusetts Light Battery: Cpt J. Henry Sleeper; 1st New Jersey Light, Battery B: Cpt A. Judson Clark; 1st New York Light, Battery D: Cpt George B. Winslow; 12th Battery New York Light: Lt George K. Dauchy; 1st Rhode Island Light, Battery E: 4th US, Battery K: Lt Robert James

=== V Corps ===
- MG George Sykes
- Escort: 5th Michigan Cavalry (squadron): Lt Samuel Harris
- Provost Guard: 12th New York (Companies D and E): Cpt Henry W. Ryder

Division	Brigade	Regiments and others
First Division: BG Charles Griffin	1st Brigade: Col Joseph Hayes	18th Massachusetts: Maj William B. White; 22nd Massachusetts: Col William S. Tilton; 1st Michigan: Ltc William A. Throop; 118th Pennsylvania: Maj Charles P. Herring
First Division: BG Charles Griffin	2nd Brigade: Col Jacob B. Sweitzer	9th Massachusetts: Col Patrick R. Guiney; 32nd Massachusetts: Col George L. Prescott; 4th Michigan: Ltc George W. Lumbard; 62nd Pennsylvania: Ltc James C. Hull
First Division: BG Charles Griffin	3rd Brigade: Col Joshua L. Chamberlain	20th Maine: Maj Ellis Spear; 16th Michigan: Cpt George H. Swan; 44th New York: Ltc Freeman Conner; 83rd Pennsylvania: Maj William H. Lamont
Second Division: BG Romeyn B. Ayres	1st Brigade: Col Sidney Burbank	2nd U.S. (6 companies): Cpt James W. Long; 3rd U.S. (6 companies): Maj William E. Prince; 11th U.S.: Maj Jonathan W. Gordon; 12th U.S.: Maj Luther B. Bruen; 14th U.S.: Capt Edward Mck. Hudson; 17th U.S.: Ltc James D. Greene
Second Division: BG Romeyn B. Ayres	3rd Brigade: BG Kenner Garrard	140th New York: Col George Ryan; 146th New York (Zouaves): Col David T. Jenkins; 91st Pennsylvania: Col Edgar M. Gregory; 155th Pennsylvania: Maj Alfred L. Pearson
Third Division: Col William McCandless	1st Brigade: Col William C. Talley	1st Pennsylvania Reserves: Ltc William W. Stewart; 2nd Pennsylvania Reserves: Maj Patrick C. Donough; 6th Pennsylvania Reserves: Col Wellington H. Ent; 13th Pennsylvania Reserves: Maj William R. Hartshorne
Third Division: Col William McCandless	3rd Brigade: Col Martin D. Hardin	5th Pennsylvania Reserves: Ltc George Dare; 9th Pennsylvania Reserves: Ltc James M. Snodgrass; 10th Pennsylvania Reserves: Ltc James B. Knox; 11th Pennsylvania Reserves: Col Samuel M. Jackson; 12th Pennsylvania Reserves: Ltc Richard Gustin
	Artillery Brigade: Cpt Augustus Pearl Martin	3rd Battery Massachusetts Light: Lt Aaron F. Walcott; 5th Battery Massachusetts Light: Cpt Charles A. Phillips; 1st New York Light, Battery C: Cpt Almont Barnes; 1st Ohio Light, Battery L: Cpt Frank C. Gibbs; 5th US, Battery D: Lt Benjamin F. Rittenhouse

=== VI Corps ===
- MG John Sedgwick
- Escort: 1st Vermont Cavalry (detachment): Capt Andrew J. Grover

Division	Brigade	Regiments and others
First Division: BG Horatio G. Wright	1st Brigade (First New Jersey Brigade): BG Alfred T. A. Torbert	1st New Jersey: Ltc William Henry Jr.; 2nd New Jersey: Col Samuel L. Buck; 3rd New Jersey: Col Henry W. Brown; 4th New Jersey: Ltc Charles Ewing; 15th New Jersey: Col William H. Penrose
First Division: BG Horatio G. Wright	2nd Brigade: BG Joseph J. Bartlett	5th Maine: Col Clark S. Edwards; 121st New York: Col Emory Upton; 95th Pennsylvania: Ltc Edward Carroll; 96th Pennsylvania: Ltc William H. Lessig
First Division: BG Horatio G. Wright	3rd Brigade: BG David Allen Russell	6th Maine: Col Benjamin F. Harris; 49th Pennsylvania: Ltc Thomas M. Hulings; 119th Pennsylvania: Col Peter C. Ellmaker; 5th Wisconsin: Col Thomas S. Allen
Second Division: BG Albion P. Howe	2nd Brigade ("Vermont Brigade"): Col Lewis A. Grant	2nd Vermont: Col James H. Walbridge; 3rd Vermont: Col Thomas O. Seaver; 4th Vermont: Ltc George P. Foster; 5th Vermont: Maj Charles P. Dudley; 6th Vermont: Col Elisha L. Barney
Second Division: BG Albion P. Howe	3rd Brigade: BG Thomas H. Neill	7th Maine: Col Edwin C. Mason; 43rd New York: Col Benjamin F. Baker; 49th New York: Col Daniel D. Bidwell; 77th New York: Ltc Winsor B. French; 61st Pennsylvania: Ltc George F. Smith
Third Division: BG Henry D. Terry	1st Brigade: BG Alexander Shaler	65th New York: Col Joseph E. Hamblin; 67th New York: Col Nelson Cross; 122nd New York: Ltc Augustus Wade Dwight; 23rd Pennsylvania: Col John Ely; 82nd Pennsylvania: Col Isaac C. Bassett
Third Division: BG Henry D. Terry	2nd Brigade: BG Henry L. Eustis	7th Massachusetts: Col Thomas D. Johns; 10th Massachusetts: Ltc Joseph B. Parsons; 2nd Rhode Island: Col Horatio Rogers Jr.
Third Division: BG Henry D. Terry	3rd Brigade: BG Frank Wheaton	62nd New York: Col David J. Nevin; 93rd Pennsylvania: Ltc John S. Long; 98th Pennsylvania: Col John F. Ballier; 102nd Pennsylvania: Col John W. Patterson; 139th Pennsylvania: Ltc William H. Moody
	Artillery Brigade: Col Charles H. Tompkins	1st Massachusetts Light, Battery A: Cpt William H. McCartney; 1st Battery New York Light: Cpt Andrew Cowan; 3rd Battery New York Light: Cpt William A. Harn; 1st Rhode Island, Battery C: Cpt Richard Waterman; 1st Rhode Island, Battery G: Cpt George W. Adams; 5th US, Battery F: Lt Leonard Martin; 5th US, Battery M: Cpt James McKnight

=== Cavalry Corps ===
- MG Alfred Pleasonton
- Headquarters Guard: 6th US: Maj Robert M. Morris

Division	Brigade	Regiments and others
First Division: BG John Buford	1st Brigade: Col George H. Chapman	8th Illinois: Maj John L. Beveridge; 12th Illinois: Cpt Henry L. Reans; 3rd Indiana: Maj William S. McClure; 8th New York: Maj William H. Benjamin
First Division: BG John Buford	2nd Brigade: Col Thomas Devin	4th New York: Ltc Augustus Pruyn; 6th New York: Maj William P. Hall; 9th New York: Col William Sackett; 17th Pennsylvania: Ltc Coe Durland; 3rd West Virginia, Companies A & C: Maj Seymour B. Conger
Second Division: BG David McM. Gregg	1st Brigade: Col John P. Taylor	1st Maryland: Maj Charles H. Russell; 1st Massachusetts: Col Horace B. Sargent; 1st New Jersey: Col Percy Wyndham; 6th Ohio: Ltc William Stedman; 1st Pennsylvania: Ltc David Gardner; 3rd Pennsylvania: Cpt James W. Walsh; 1st Rhode Island: Col John L. Thompson
Second Division: BG David McM. Gregg	2nd Brigade: Col John Irvin Gregg	District of Columbia, Independent Company: Cpt William H. Orton; 1st Maine: Col Charles H. Smith; 10th New York: Maj Mathew Henry Avery; 4th Pennsylvania: Maj George H. Covode; 8th Pennsylvania: Col Pennock Huey; 13th Pennsylvania: Ltc Garrick Mallery Jr.; 16th Pennsylvania: Ltc John K. Robison
Third Division: BG Judson Kilpatrick	1st Brigade: BG Henry E. Davies Jr.	2nd New York: Ltc Otto Harhaus; 5th New York: Maj John Hammond; 18th Pennsylvania: Maj Harvey B. VanVorhis; 1st West Virginia (10 companies): Maj Charles E. Capehart
Third Division: BG Judson Kilpatrick	2nd Brigade ("Michigan Brigade"): BG George A. Custer	1st Michigan: Col Charles H. Town; 5th Michigan: Col Russell A. Alger; 6th Michigan: Ltc Henry E. Thompson; 7th Michigan: Col William D. Mann; 1st Vermont: Col Edward B. Sawyer
Third Division: BG Judson Kilpatrick	Headquarters Guard	1st Ohio, Companies A & C: Cpt Noah Jones
	Reserve Brigade: BG Wesley Merritt	6th Pennsylvania: Maj Henry C. Whelam; 1st US: Cpt Marcus A. Reno; 2nd US: Cpt George A. Gordon; 5th US: Cpt Abraham K. Arnold
	unattached	19th New York (1st Dragoons): Col Alfred Gibbs
Horse Artillery	1st Brigade: Capt James M. Robertson	6th Battery New York Light: Cpt Joseph W. Martin; 2nd US, Batteries B and L: Lt Albert O. Vincent; 2nd US, Battery D: Lt Edward B. Williston; 2nd US, Battery M: Lt Alexander C. M. Pennington Jr.; 4th US, Battery A: Lt Horatio B. Reed; 4th US, Battery E: Cpt Samuel S. Elder
Horse Artillery	2nd Brigade: Cpt William M. Graham	9th Battery Michigan Light: Cpt Jabez J. Daniels; 1st US, Batteries E & G: Lt Egbert W. Olcott; 1st US, Battery K: Lt John Egan; 2nd US, Battery A: Lt Robert Clarke; 2nd US, Battery G: Lt John H. Butler; 3rd US, Battery C: Cpt Dunbar R. Ransom

=== Artillery Reserve ===
- BG Robert O. Tyler

Brigade	Batteries
1st Regular Brigade: Cpt Alanson M. Randol	1st US, Battery H: Lt Philip D. Mason; 3rd US, Batteries F & K: Lt George F. Barstow; 4th US, Battery C: Lt Charles L. Fitzhugh
1st Volunteer Brigade: Ltc Freeman McGilvery	6th Maine Light: Lt William H. Rogers; 9th Battery Massachusetts Light : Cpt John Bigelow; 4th Battery New York Light : Lt Thomas Goodman; Pennsylvania Light, Battery C and Battery F: Cpt James Thompson
2nd Volunteer Brigade: Cpt Elijah D. Taft	1st Connecticut Heavy, Battery B: Cpt Albert F. Brooker; 1st Connecticut Heavy, Battery M: Cpt Franklin A. Pratt; 1st New York Light, Battery B: Lt Robert E. Rogers; 5th Battery New York Light: Cpt Elijah D. Taft; 1st West Virginia Light, Battery C: Cpt Wallace Hill
3rd Volunteer Brigade: Maj Robert H. Fitzhugh	Maryland Light, Battery A: Lt Thomas Binyon; 1st Battery New Hampshire Light: Cpt Frederick M. Edgell; 1st New Jersey Light, Battery A: Cpt William Hexamer; 1st New York Light, Battery K (11th Battery New York Light attached): Lt Edward L. Bailey; 15th Battery New York Light: Cpt Patrick Hart
Ammunition Guard	6th New York Heavy Artillery: Col J. Howard Kitching
