= Bristoe campaign order of battle =

The order of battle for the Bristoe campaign includes:

- Bristoe campaign order of battle: Confederate
- Bristoe campaign order of battle: Union
