= 148th Pennsylvania Infantry Regiment =

Union Army infantry regiment

148th Regiment Pennsylvania Volunteer Infantry
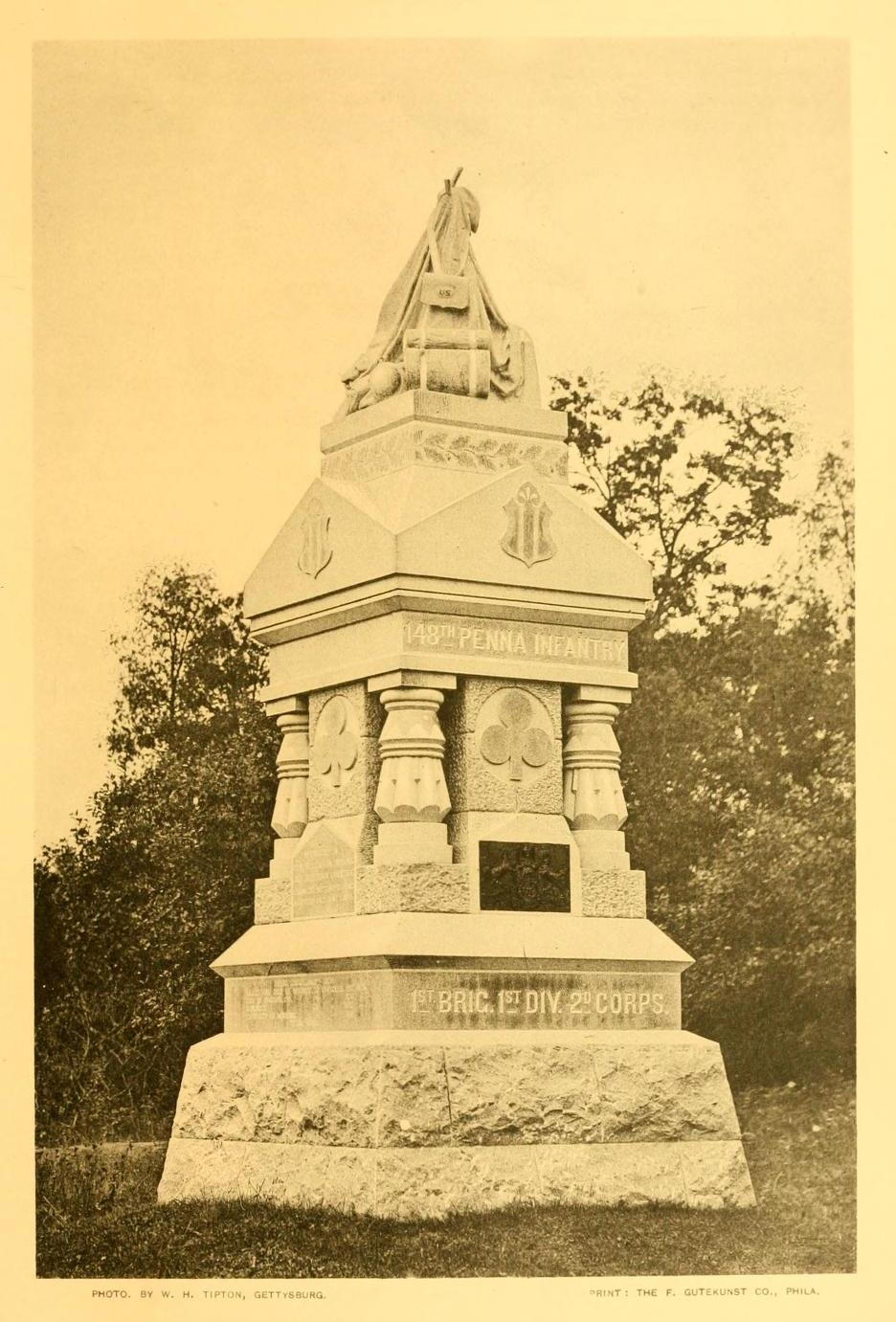
- The 148th Pennsylvania's regimental monument in the Wheatfield at Gettysburg National Military Park
- Active: September 8, 1862 – June 1, 1865
- Country: United States of America
- Allegiance: Union
- Branch: Infantry
- Size: 1,339
- Engagements: Battle of Chancellorsville; Battle of Gettysburg; Bristoe Campaign; Mine Run Campaign; Battle of the Wilderness; Battle of Spotsylvania Court House; Battle of Totopotomoy Creek; Battle of Cold Harbor; Siege of Petersburg; First Battle of Deep Bottom; Second Battle of Deep Bottom; Second Battle of Ream's Station; Battle of Fort Stedman; Appomattox Campaign; Battle of Sutherland's Station; Battle of Sailor's Creek

The 148th Regiment Pennsylvania Volunteer Infantry was an infantry regiment that served in the Union Army during the American Civil War.

== Service ==
The 148th Pennsylvania Infantry was composed of volunteers raised chiefly in Centre County, Pennsylvania, with seven companies hailing from the county. Company C in particular was recruited in the area surrounding the Agricultural College of Pennsylvania (today known as Pennsylvania State University) and included many of the college's students. The regiment was filled out with a company each from Clarion, Jefferson, and Indiana Counties. Once companies were raised, the regiment was organized at Harrisburg, Pennsylvania, and mustered in for a three-year enlistment on September 8, 1862, under the command of Colonel James Addams Beaver.

Date attached	Organization
September 9, 1862	VIII Corps, Middle Department
December 17, 1862	1st Brigade, 1st Division, II Corps, Army of the Potomac
October 10, 1863	3rd Brigade, 1st Division, II Corps, Army of the Potomac
March 25, 1864	4th Brigade, 1st Division, II Corps, Army of the Potomac

The 148th Pennsylvania Infantry mustered out of service on June 1, 1865, near Alexandria, Virginia.

Soldiers from the 148th are featured in the third chapter of MacKinlay Kantor's Pulitzer Prize-winning novel "Andersonville" (1955).

== Detailed service ==
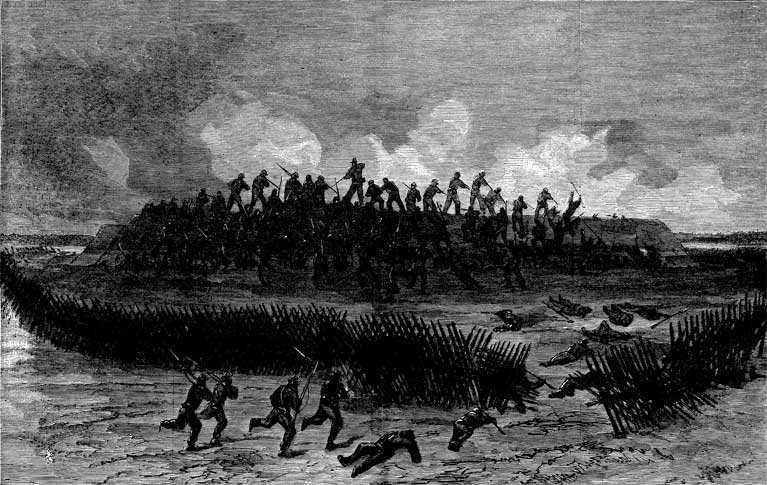
October 27, 1864—Armed with Spencer repeating rifles, men of Company K, 148th Pennsylvania Volunteers, advance in skirmish line and capture a fort garrisoned by the 46th Virginia Infantry during the Siege of Petersburg, Virginia.

Moved to Cockeysville, Md., September 9–10, 1862, and guard duty on Northern Central Railroad until December 9, 1862. Moved to Falmouth, Va., December 9–18, 1862. Duty at Falmouth, Va., until April 27, 1863. Chancellorsville Campaign April 27-May 6. Battle of Chancellorsville May 1–5. Gettysburg Campaign June 14-July 24. Skirmish at Haymarket June 25. Battle of Gettysburg, July 1–3. Pursuit of Lee July 5–24. Wapping Heights, Va., July 23. Expedition to Port Conway August 31-September 4. Richardson's Ford September 1. Duty on Orange & Alexandria Railroad and the Rappahannock until October. Advance from the Rappahannock to the Rapidan September 13–17. Bristoe Campaign October 9–22. South side of the Rappahannock October 12. Auburn and Bristoe October 14. Advance to line of the Rappahannock November 7–8. Kelly's Ford November 7. Mine Run Campaign November 26-December 2. Demonstration on the Rapidan February 6–7, 1864. Morton's Ford February 6–7. Duty near Stevensburg until May. Rapidan Campaign May 4-June 12. Battles of the Wilderness May 5–7; Spotsylvania May 8–12; Po River May 9–10; Spotsylvania Court House May 12–21. Assault on the Salient May 12. Milford Station May 20. Reconnaissance by the regiment across the North Anna River May 22. North Anna River May 23–26. On line of the Pamunkey May 26–28. Totopotomoy May 28–31. Cold Harbor June 1–12. Before Petersburg June 16–18. Siege of Petersburg June 16, 1864, to April 2, 1865. Jerusalem Plank Road June 21–23, 1864. Demonstration on north side of the James at Deep Bottom July 27–29. Deep Bottom July 27–28. Mine Explosion, Petersburg. July 30 (reserve). Demonstration north of the James at Deep Bottom August 13–20. Strawberry Plains, Deep Bottom, August 14–18. Ream's Station, Weldon Railroad, August 25. Assault on Davidson's Confederate Battery October 27. Front of Forts Morton and Sedgwick October 29. Reconnaissance to Hatcher's Run December 9–10. Dabney's Mills, Hatcher's Run, February 5–7, 1865. Watkins' House March 25. Appomattox Campaign March 28-April 9. Gravelly Run March 29. Boydton Road or Hatcher's Run March 30–31. Crow's House, White Oak Road, March 31. Sutherland Station April 2. Sailor's Creek April 6. High Bridge, Farmville, April 7. Appomattox Court House April 9. Surrender of Lee and his army. March to Washington, D.C., May 2–12. Grand Review of the Armies May 23.

== Casualties ==
The regiment lost a total of 397 men during service; 12 officers and 198 enlisted men killed or mortally wounded, 4 officers and 183 enlisted men died of disease.

Pvt George Osman George Osman enlisted Aug 19, 1862 at Centre Co, PA, Private at the age of 22. He mustered into Co "C" 148th PA Infantry Listed wounded July 2, 1863 at Battle of Gettysburg. Died July 4, 1863 of his wounds In Gettysburg PA

== Commanders ==
- Colonel James Addams Beaver - wounded in action at the Battle of Chancellorsville
- Colonel Henry Boyd McKeen (81st Pennsylvania Infantry) - placed in temporary command by Colonel Edward E. Cross (the brigade commander) for the Battle of Gettysburg; Col Beaver was ill and Col Cross believed the regiment's lieutenant colonel was too inexperienced
- Lieutenant Colonel Robert McFarlane - commanded at the Battle of Gettysburg after Col Cross was mortally wounded on July 2 and Col McKeen assumed command of the brigade
- Major George A. Fairlamb - commanded the regiment at the Battle of Chancellorsville after Col Beaver was wounded
- Captain Alfred A. Rhinehart - commanded the regiment at the First Battle of Deep Bottom

== Notable members ==
- Colonel James Addams Beaver - 20th governor of Pennsylvania (1887-1891); acting president of Pennsylvania State University, 1906-1908
- Captain Jeremiah Z. Brown, Company K - Medal of Honor recipient for action at the Siege of Petersburg, October 27, 1864
- Corporal Henry Meyer, Company A - Pennsylvania Dutch poet
- Private Robert W. Ammerman, Company B - Medal of Honor recipient for action at the Battle of Spotsylvania Court House
- Private George W. Harris, Company B - Medal of Honor recipient for action at the Battle of Spotsylvania Court House
- Private Josiah Phillips, Company E - Medal of Honor recipient for action at the Battle of Sutherland's Station

== See also ==
- List of Pennsylvania Civil War Units
- Pennsylvania in the Civil War
