= 5th New Hampshire Infantry Regiment =

Infantry regiment of the Union Army in the American Civil War

- Active: October 22, 1861, to July 8, 1865
- Country: United States
- Allegiance: Union
- Branch: Infantry
- Engagements: Siege of Yorktown; Battle of Fair Oaks; Seven Days Battles; Battle of Savage's Station; Battle of Malvern Hill; Maryland Campaign; Battle of South Mountain; Battle of Antietam; Battle of Fredericksburg; Battle of Chancellorsville; Gettysburg campaign; Battle of Gettysburg; Battle of Cold Harbor; Siege of Petersburg; Second Battle of Petersburg; Battle of the Crater; Appomattox Campaign; Battle of White Oak Road; Battle of Sutherland's Station; Third Battle of Petersburg; Battle of Sayler's Creek; Battle of High Bridge; Battle of Appomattox Court House

Commanders
- Notable commanders: Colonel Edward E. Cross

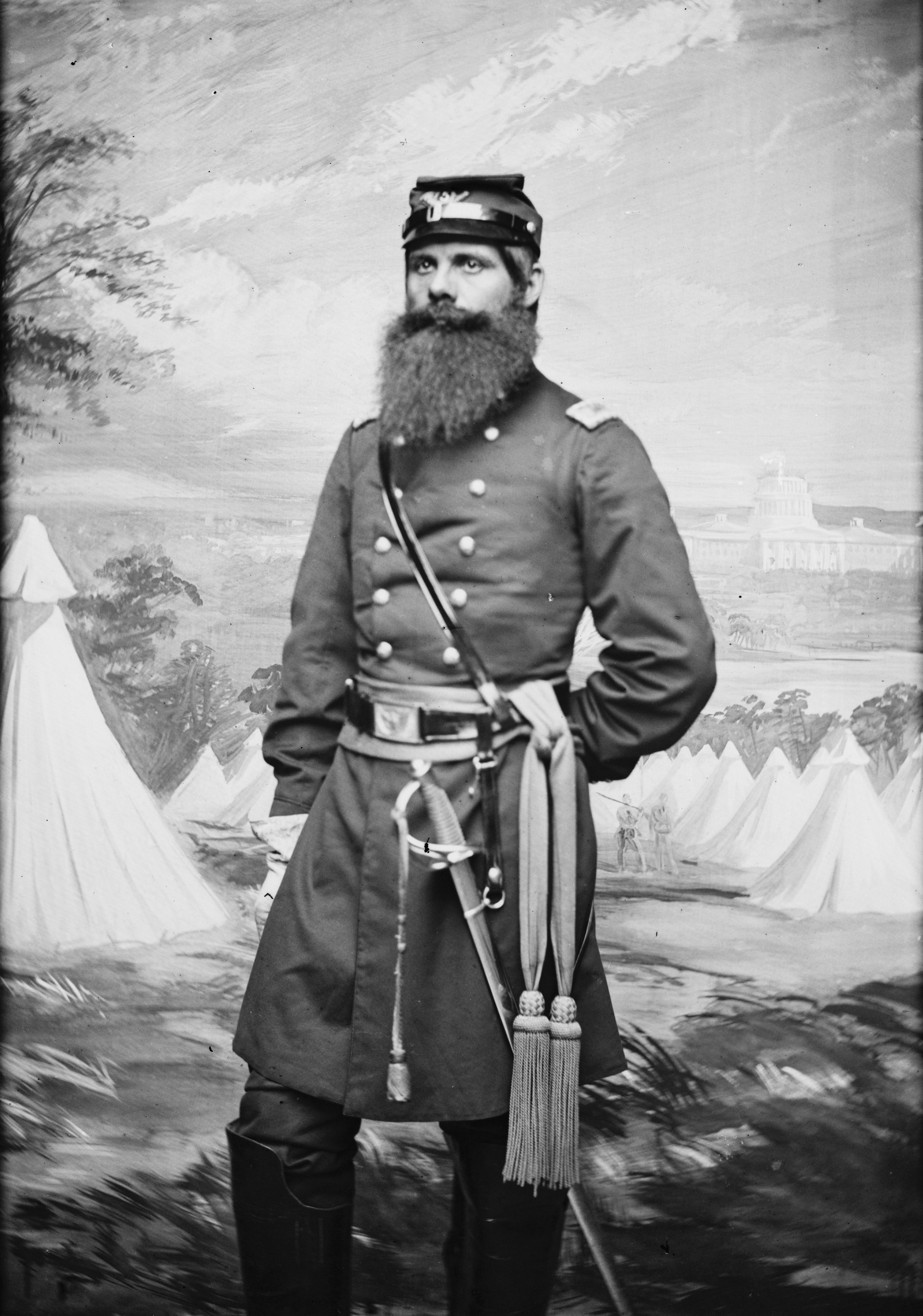
Maj. William W. Cook, 5th New Hampshire Volunteers

The 5th New Hampshire Infantry Regiment was an infantry regiment that served in the Union Army during the American Civil War. The regiment sustained the greatest total combat losses of any infantry or cavalry regiment in the Union, with 295 killed and 756 wounded.

== Service ==
The 5th New Hampshire Infantry was organized in Concord, New Hampshire and mustered in for a three-year enlistment on October 22, 1861, under the command of Colonel Edward Ephraim Cross.

One of the original organizers, George Williamson Balloch, recruited nearly half a company and was commissioned first lieutenant of Company D.

The regiment was attached to Howard's Brigade, Sumner's Division, Army of the Potomac, to March 1862. 1st Brigade, 1st Division, II Corps, Army of the Potomac, to July 1863. Concord, New Hampshire, Department of the East, to November 1863. Marston's Command, Point Lookout, Maryland, to May 1864. 1st Brigade, 1st Division, II Corps, Army of the Potomac, to June 1865.

The 5th New Hampshire Infantry mustered out of service June 28, 1865, and was discharged July 8, 1865.

== Detailed service ==
Left New Hampshire for Washington, D.C., October 29, 1861. Camp at Bladensburg, Md., defenses of Washington, D.C., until November 27, 1861. Expedition to lower Maryland November 3–11. At Camp California, near Alexandria, Va., until March 10, 1862. Scout to Burke's Station January 17, 1862 (Company A). Advance on Manassas, Va., March 10–15. Reconnaissance to Gainesville March 20, and to Rappahannock Station March 28–29. Warrenton Junction March 28. Moved to the Virginia Peninsula April 4. Siege of Yorktown, Va., April 5-May 4. Temporarily attached to Woodbury's Engineer Brigade. Construct Grapevine Bridge over Chickahominy May 28–30. Battle of Fair Oaks or Seven Pines May 31-June 1. Seven days before Richmond June 25-July 1. Orchard Station June 28. Peach Orchard, Allen's Farm and Savage's Station June 29. White Oak Swamp and Glendale June 30. Malvern Hill July 1. At Harrison's Landing until August 16. Movement to Fortress Monroe, then to Alexandria and to Centreville, Va., August 16–30. Cover Pope's retreat from Bull Run. Maryland Campaign September–October. Battle of South Mountain, Md., September 14 (reserve). Antietam Creek, near Keedysville, September 15. Battle of Antietam, September 16–17. Duty at Harpers Ferry, W. Va., September 21 to October 29. Reconnaissance to Charlestown October 16–17. Advance up Loudoun Valley and movement to Falmouth, Va., October 29-November 17. Battle of Fredericksburg, Va., December 12–15. Burnside's Second Campaign, "Mud March," January 20–24, 1863. Duty at Falmouth until April. Chancellorsville Campaign April 27-May 6. Battle of Chancellorsville May 1–5. Reconnaissance to Rappahannock June 9. Gettysburg campaign June 13-July 24. Battle of Gettysburg, July 1–3. Moved to Concord, N.H., July 26-August 3. Duty at Draft Rendezvous, Concord, N.H., until November. Moved to Point Lookout, Md., November 8–13, and duty there guarding prisoners until May 27, 1864. Moved to Cold Harbor, Va., May 27-June 1, and joined the Army of the Potomac. Battles about Cold Harbor June 1–12. Before Petersburg, Va., June 16–19. Siege of Petersburg June 16, 1864, to April 2, 1865. Jerusalem Plank Road June 22–23, 1865. Deep Bottom, north of James River, July 27–28. Mine Explosion, Petersburg, July 30 (reserve). Demonstration north of James River August 13–20. Strawberry Plains August 14–18. Ream's Station August 25. Non-veterans mustered out October 12, 1864. Reconnaissance to Hatcher's Run December 9–10. Dabney's Mills, Hatcher's Run, February 5–7, 1865. Watkins' House March 25. Appomattox Campaign March 28-April 9. On line of Hatcher's and Gravelly Runs March 29–30. Hatcher's Run or Boydton Road March 31. White Oak Road March 31. Sutherland Station April 2. Fall of Petersburg April 2. Sailor's Creek April 6. High Bridge and Farmville April 7. Appomattox Court House April 9. Surrender of Lee and his army. Moved to Washington, D.C., May 2–12. Grand Review of the Armies May 23.

== Casualties ==
The regiment lost a total of 473 men during service; 18 officers and 277 enlisted men killed or mortally wounded, 2 officers and 176 enlisted men died of disease.

== Commanders ==
- Colonel Edward Ephraim Cross - mortally wounded at the Battle of Gettysburg while commanding 1st Brigade, 1st Division, II Corps
- Colonel Charles E. Hapgood - commanded at the Battle of Gettysburg and afterward
- Colonel Welcome E. Crafts - took command after Hapgood was wounded; also took command when the regiment was redesignated as 5th New Hampshire Battalion
- Lieutenant Colonel James E. Larkin
- Major John S. Ricker

== Flags ==
The regiment was given 2 flags in 1861, one of them was a National flag while the other was a state flag. By late 1862, they were completely ruined from combat with their fields cut up by rebel gun fire. In January 1863, a new set of colors were presented to the regiment. The new National flag had the names and dates of the battles the unit took part in. While the state flag had its coat of arms surrounded by the names of fallen officers of the regiment.

== See also ==
- List of New Hampshire Civil War units
- New Hampshire in the American Civil War
