= George Williamson Balloch =

Union officer and civil servant (1825-1907)

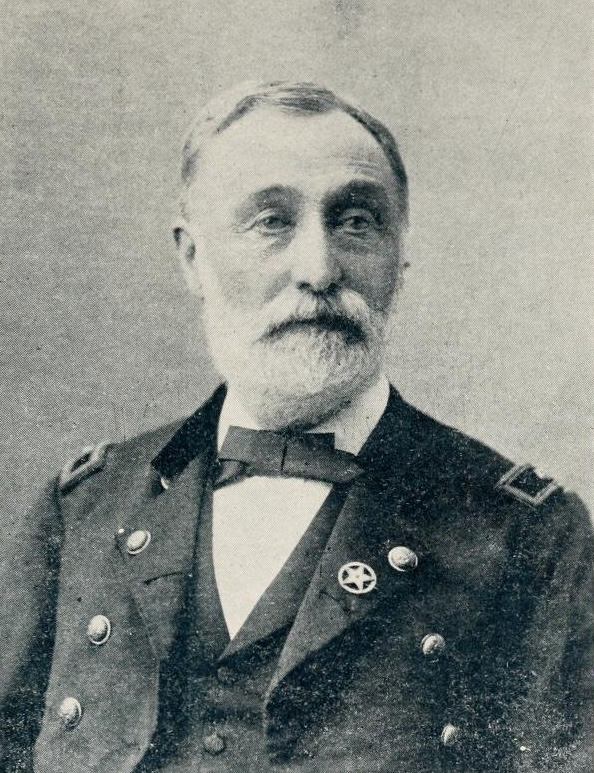
- Balloch in later life
- Born: December 3, 1825; West Claremont, New Hampshire, U.S.
- Died: May 17, 1907 (aged 81); Washington, D.C., U.S.
- Burial place: Glenwood Cemetery, Washington, D.C.
- Military career
- Allegiance: United States
- Branch: Union Army
- Service years: 1861–1868
- Rank: Lieutenant Colonel; Brevet Brigadier General
- Unit: 5th New Hampshire Infantry Regiment
- Commands: Chief Commissary of Subsistence: XI Corps; XX Corps; Army of Georgia
- Conflicts: American Civil War; Peninsula Campaign; Second Bull Run; Antietam; Fredericksburg; Chancellorsville; Gettysburg; Lookout Mountain; Chattanooga; Atlanta Campaign; Sherman's March to the Sea; Carolinas Campaign

George Williamson Balloch (December 3, 1825 – May 17, 1907) was an American military officer, railroad agent, and civil servant who served during the American Civil War and in the post-war Freedmen's Bureau. Rising from first lieutenant to the brevet rank of brigadier general of volunteers, he served as Chief Commissary of Subsistence for several major commands, including the Eleventh Corps, the Twentieth Corps, and the Army of Georgia. He helped open the "Cracker Line" that relieved the starving Union forces at Chattanooga, narrowly survived Gettysburg when a bullet grazed his ear, and kept Sherman's armies fed through the Atlanta Campaign, the March to the Sea, and the Carolinas Campaign. After the war, he served as Chief Disbursing Officer of the Bureau of Refugees, Freedmen and Abandoned Lands under General Oliver Otis Howard, disbursing over twenty million dollars during Reconstruction, and was the first Treasurer of the Board of Trustees of Howard University.

== Early life and education ==
Balloch was born on December 3, 1825, in West Claremont, Sullivan County, New Hampshire, on the south side of the Sugar River near its junction with the Connecticut River. He was the son of George Williamson Balloch Sr. and Amanda West Balloch. The family was of Scottish origin; his grandfather, James Balloch, emigrated from Scotland in 1790 and settled in Cornish, New Hampshire. Balloch later traced his lineage further to Donald Balloch, a fifteenth-century leader associated with the Lordship of the Isles.

When Balloch was a year old, the family moved to the neighboring town of Cornish, where he grew up on a farm, attending the same schoolhouse once attended by Salmon P. Chase. He later enrolled at the New England Seminary in Windsor, Vermont, for two terms and entered Norwich University in Vermont on September 8, 1844.

== Pre-war career ==
After leaving Norwich University in 1847, Balloch worked in the railroad industry for over a decade. In March 1847, he joined the Sullivan County Railroad as an engineer's assistant at Charlestown, New Hampshire, and from 1850 held successive positions with the Boston and Maine Railroad as station agent at Wakefield and Andover, Massachusetts, and at Great Falls (now Somersworth), New Hampshire. In 1855, he became general ticket and freight agent of the Great Falls and Conway Railroad. While living in Great Falls, Balloch served as town clerk, became the town's first police justice, and took an active interest in the local fire department. In 1858, Balloch co-founded a drug and grocery business which he ran until the outbreak of the Civil War.

== Civil War service ==
=== Early service and commissary appointment ===
In September 1861, Balloch opened a recruiting office and enlisted nearly half a company for the 5th New Hampshire Volunteer Infantry. On October 12, 1861, he was commissioned first lieutenant of Company D, under Captain John Murray and Colonel Edward E. Cross. He was mustered into United States service at Concord, New Hampshire, on October 23, 1861. The regiment departed New Hampshire on October 28, 1861, and upon arriving at the front at Bladensburg, Maryland, was assigned to the brigade of General Howard, on the defenses of Washington.

On November 11, 1861, Balloch was detailed by Howard as acting commissary of subsistence for the brigade, which subsequently became the First Brigade, First Division, II Corps. He served through the Peninsula campaign, Second Bull Run, Antietam, and Fredericksburg. On July 21, 1862, he was appointed captain and commissary of subsistence, U.S. Volunteers, and assigned to his former brigade. He served in that capacity until January 1, 1863, when he was transferred to the Second Division, IX Corps.

=== Eleventh Corps and Eastern campaigns ===
In April 1863, Howard was promoted to major general and assigned to command the Eleventh Corps. Howard requested that Balloch serve as chief commissary of the corps, and on May 14, 1863, Balloch was assigned to that role with the rank of lieutenant colonel of cavalry. He served through the Battle of Chancellorsville and the Gettysburg campaign. At Gettysburg, Balloch narrowly escaped being killed or gravely wounded when a bullet grazed his left ear and another struck his sword scabbard, bending it so that the sword could not be drawn.

=== Western Theater and the Atlanta Campaign ===
In late September 1863, the Eleventh Corps was transferred to the Army of the Cumberland. Balloch participated in the opening of the "Cracker Line" from Bridgeport to Chattanooga, a supply route credited with relieving the besieged forces of General George H. Thomas, and in the subsequent battles of Lookout Mountain and Chattanooga.

During the winter of 1863–1864, the corps encamped in Lookout Valley. In April 1864, the Eleventh and Twelfth Corps were consolidated into the new Twentieth Corps under General Joseph Hooker. Hooker invited Balloch to serve as chief commissary of the new corps, which he accepted on April 14, 1864. He participated in the Atlanta campaign.

=== March to the Sea and the Carolinas ===
During the March to the Sea, Balloch served as both chief commissary of the Twentieth Corps and chief commissary of the Left Wing of Sherman's army (comprising the Fourteenth and Twentieth Corps) under General Henry W. Slocum. The march ended with the surrender of Savannah on December 22, 1864.

After a reorganization in Savannah, the Left Wing was redesignated the Army of Georgia under Slocum's command. Balloch served as chief commissary of both the Army of Georgia and the Twentieth Corps during the Carolinas campaign, which began around January 20, 1865, and ended at Goldsboro, North Carolina, around March 25. He remained through the surrenders of Robert E. Lee and Joseph E. Johnston and participated in the Grand Review of the Armies in Washington, D.C.

=== Brevet promotions ===
Balloch received four successive brevet promotions: brevet major (July 28, 1866) for faithful and meritorious services; brevet lieutenant colonel (March 31, 1866) for meritorious services; brevet colonel (April 5, 1866) for efficient and meritorious services; and brevet brigadier general of volunteers (August 26, 1866) for faithful and meritorious services in the Commissary Department.

He was mustered out of service on September 1, 1868, as captain and commissary of subsistence, and was reportedly the last volunteer officer mustered out of the United States service.

== Freedmen's Bureau ==
On June 6, 1865, Balloch was appointed colonel and inspector of subsistence and assigned to duty with General Howard, who had been appointed Commissioner of the Bureau of Refugees, Freedmen and Abandoned Lands. Howard designated Balloch as Chief Disbursing Officer, a position he held from 1865 to 1871. During his tenure, which he described as "very arduous and difficult", Balloch disbursed over twenty million dollars in Bureau funds.

== Later career and civic life ==
After leaving the Freedmen's Bureau in 1871, Balloch served as Superintendent of Streets of Washington, D.C., under the Board of Public Works for three years, then established a claim, patent, and insurance business. He helped organize the Columbia and Silver Spring Street Railway and the Second National Bank, serving as the bank's notary for nearly a quarter of a century, and was president of the Glenwood Cemetery Company. He served as the first Treasurer of the Board of Trustees of Howard University from 1867 to 1872 and remained on the board until 1902.

Balloch was a member of the Republican Party, a founding member of the First Congregational Church in Washington, D.C., a 33rd-degree Freemason in both the York and Scottish Rites, and a member of the Grand Army of the Republic (John A. Rawlins Post No. 1).

== Personal life and death ==
Balloch married Martha J. Palmer of Charlestown, New Hampshire, on April 18, 1849. They had eight children, three of whom survived to adulthood: George Stuart Balloch of Allerton, Iowa; Dr. Edmund A. Balloch of Washington, D.C.; and Mary L. Safford of Washington, D.C.

Balloch died on May 17, 1907, at his residence at 2445 Brightwood Avenue in Washington, D.C., at the age of 81. Although his health had been declining for several months, his death was unexpected. Funeral services were conducted at the family residence by Rev. Dr. S. M. Newman, former pastor of First Congregational Church, and Rev. Dr. Samuel H. Woodrow, the church's current pastor. He is buried at Glenwood Cemetery in Washington, D.C.

== See also ==
- List of American Civil War brevet generals
