= Josiah Phillips =

- Born: c. 1830; Wyoming County, New York
- Died: December 11, 1894
- Burial place: De Pere, Wisconsin
- Military career
- Allegiance: United States of America
- Branch: United States Army; Union Army
- Rank: Private
- Units: Company E, 148th Pennsylvania Infantry
- Conflicts: American Civil War: Battle of Sutherland's Station
- Awards: Medal of Honor

Private Josiah Phillips (c. 1830 – December 11, 1894) was an American soldier who fought in the American Civil War for the Union. Phillips served in the 148th Pennsylvania Infantry regiment, a volunteer regiment that was a part of the Army of the Potomac. Phillips received the United States' highest award for bravery during combat, the Medal of Honor. Phillips's medal was won for his capturing of the flag during the Battle of Sutherland's Station on April 2, 1865. He was honored with the Medal of Honor by President Andrew Johnson on May 10, 1865.

Phillips was born in Wyoming County in New York, and entered service in Ulysses, Pennsylvania, where the 148th Pennsylvania Infantry Regiment was recruiting. Phillips is buried in South Lawrence Cemetery in De Pere, Wisconsin.

== Medal of Honor citation ==
The President of the United States of America, in the name of Congress, takes pleasure in presenting the Medal of Honor to Private Josiah Phillips, United States Army, for extraordinary heroism on 2 April 1865, while serving with Company E, 148th Pennsylvania Infantry, in action at Sutherland Station, Virginia, for capture of flag.

== See also ==
- List of American Civil War Medal of Honor recipients: M–P
