= Robert W. Ammerman =

Medal of Honor recipient (1841–1907)

- Born: 1841; Centre County, Pennsylvania, U.S.
- Died: September 30, 1907 (aged 65–66); McAlisterville, Pennsylvania, U.S.
- Burial place: Lost Creek Presbyterian Cemetery, McAlisterville, Pennsylvania
- Military career
- Allegiance: United States
- Branch: United States Army; Union Army
- Service years: 1862–1865
- Rank: Private
- Units: Company B, 148th Regiment Pennsylvania Volunteer Infantry
- Conflicts: American Civil War
- Awards: Medal of Honor

Robert Wesley Ammerman (1841 – September 30, 1907) was an American soldier who received the Medal of Honor for valor during the American Civil War.

== Biography ==
Ammerman joined the 148th Pennsylvania Infantry from Milesburg, Pennsylvania, in August 1862. While performing his MOH action, he suffered the loss of his right leg, and was discharged due to his wounds in May 1865. He died on September 30, 1907, and was laid to rest in the Lost Creek Presbyterian Cemetery in McAlisterville, Pennsylvania.

== Medal of Honor citation ==
Citation:

The President of the United States of America, in the name of Congress, takes pleasure in presenting the Medal of Honor to Private Robert Wesley Ammerman, United States Army, for extraordinary heroism on 12 May 1864, while serving with Company B, 148th Pennsylvania Infantry, in action at Spotsylvania, Virginia, for capture of battle flag of 8th North Carolina (Confederate States of America), being one of the foremost in the assault.

== See also ==
- List of American Civil War Medal of Honor recipients: A–F
