= Bristoe campaign order of battle: Confederate =

The following Confederate States Army units and commanders fought in the Bristoe campaign (October 13–November 7, 1863) of the American Civil War. The Union order of battle is listed separately. Order of battle compiled from the army organization from September 30, 1863, the casualty returns and the reports.

== Abbreviations used ==
=== Military rank ===
- Gen = General
- LTG = Lieutenant General
- MG = Major General
- BG = Brigadier General
- Col = Colonel
- Ltc = Lieutenant Colonel
- Maj = Major
- Cpt = Captain

=== Other ===
- (w) = wounded
- (mw) = mortally wounded
- (k) = killed in action
- (c) = captured

== Army of Northern Virginia ==
Gen Robert E. Lee

=== Second Corps ===
LTG Richard S. Ewell

| Division | Brigade | Regiments and others |
|---|---|---|
| Early's Division; MG Jubal A. Early | Hays' Brigade BG Harry T. Hays | 5th Louisiana; 6th Louisiana; 7th Louisiana; 8th Louisiana; 9th Louisiana |
| Early's Division; MG Jubal A. Early | Hoke's Brigade Col Archibald C. Godwin (c); Ltc Samuel McD. Tate | 6th North Carolina; 21st North Carolina; 54th North Carolina; 57th North Carolina; 1st Battalion North Carolina Sharpshooters |
| Early's Division; MG Jubal A. Early | Gordon's Brigade BG John B. Gordon | 13th Georgia; 26th Georgia; 31st Georgia; 38th Georgia; 60th Georgia; 61st Georgia |
| Early's Division; MG Jubal A. Early | Pegram's Brigade BG John Pegram | 13th Virginia; 31st Virginia; 49th Virginia; 52nd Virginia; 58th Virginia |
| Johnson's Division; MG Edward Johnson | Stonewall Brigade BG James A. Walker | 2nd Virginia; 4th Virginia; 5th Virginia; 27th Virginia; 33rd Virginia |
| Johnson's Division; MG Edward Johnson | Steuart's Brigade BG George H. Steuart | 1st Maryland Battalion; 1st North Carolina; 3rd North Carolina; 10th Virginia; 23rd Virginia; 37th Virginia |
| Johnson's Division; MG Edward Johnson | Jones' Brigade BG John M. Jones | 21st Virginia; 25th Virginia; 42nd Virginia; 44th Virginia; 48th Virginia; 50th Virginia |
| Johnson's Division; MG Edward Johnson | Stafford's Brigade BG Leroy A. Stafford | 1st Louisiana; 2nd Louisiana; 10th Louisiana; 14th Louisiana; 15th Louisiana |
| Rodes' Division; MG Robert E. Rodes | Daniel's Brigade BG Junius Daniel | 32nd North Carolina; 43rd North Carolina; 45th North Carolina; 53rd North Carolina; 2nd North Carolina Battalion |
| Rodes' Division; MG Robert E. Rodes | Ramseur's Brigade BG Stephen D. Ramseur | 2nd North Carolina; 4th North Carolina; 14th North Carolina; 30th North Carolina |
| Rodes' Division; MG Robert E. Rodes | Doles' Brigade BG George P. Doles | 4th Georgia; 12th Georgia; 21st Georgia; 44th Georgia |
| Rodes' Division; MG Robert E. Rodes | Battle's Brigade BG Cullen A. Battle | 3rd Alabama; 5th Alabama; 6th Alabama; 12th Alabama; 26th Alabama |
| Rodes' Division; MG Robert E. Rodes | Johnston's Brigade Col Thomas M. Garrett | 5th North Carolina: Ltc John W. Lea; 12th North Carolina: Col Henry E. Coleman; 20th North Carolina: Col Thomas F. Toon; 23rd North Carolina: Cpt Frank Bennett |
| Artillery; BG Armistead L. Long | Brown's Battalion Col J. Thompson Brown; Maj Robert A. Hardaway | 2nd Richmond (Virginia) Howitzers; 3rd Richmond (Virginia) Howitzers; Powhatan (Virginia) Artillery; Rockbridge (Virginia) Artillery; Salem (Virginia) Flying Artillery |
| Artillery; BG Armistead L. Long | Nelson's Battalion Ltc William Nelson | Milledge's (Georgia) Battery; Amherst (Virginia) Artillery; Fluvanna (Virginia) Artillery |
| Artillery; BG Armistead L. Long | Andrews' Battalion Ltc Richard S. Andrews | 1st Maryland Artillery; Chesapeake (Maryland) Artillery; Alleghany (Virginia) Artillery; Lee (Virginia) Battery |
| Artillery; BG Armistead L. Long | Jones' Battalion Ltc Hilary P. Jones; Cpt James McD. Carrington | Louisiana Guard Battery; Charlottesville (Virginia) Artillery: Cpt James McD. Carrington; Courtney (Virginia) Artillery; Staunton (Virginia) Artillery |
| Artillery; BG Armistead L. Long | Carter's Battalion Ltc Thomas H. Carter | Jefferson Davis (Alabama) Artillery; King William (Virginia) Artillery; Morris (Virginia) Artillery; Orange (Virginia) Artillery |

=== Third Corps ===
LTG Ambrose P. Hill

- Provost Guard: 5th Alabama Battalion

| Division | Brigade | Regiments and others |
|---|---|---|
| Anderson's Division; MG Richard H. Anderson | Wilcox's (old) Brigade Col John C. C. Sanders | 8th Alabama; 9th Alabama; 10th Alabama; 11th Alabama; 14th Alabama |
| Anderson's Division; MG Richard H. Anderson | Posey's Brigade BG Carnot Posey (mw) | 12th Mississippi; 16th Mississippi; 19th Mississippi; 48th Mississippi |
| Anderson's Division; MG Richard H. Anderson | Mahone's Brigade BG William Mahone | 6th Virginia; 12th Virginia; 16th Virginia; 41st Virginia; 61st Virginia |
| Anderson's Division; MG Richard H. Anderson | Wright' s Brigade BG Ambrose R. Wright | 3rd Georgia; 22nd Georgia; 48th Georgia; 2nd Georgia Battalion |
| Anderson's Division; MG Richard H. Anderson | Perry's Brigade BG Edward A. Perry | 2nd Florida; 5th Florida; 8th Florida: Ltc William Baya (w) |
| Heth's Division; MG Henry Heth | Davis' Brigade BG Joseph R. Davis | 2nd Mississippi; 11th Mississippi; 42nd Mississippi; 55th North Carolina |
| Heth's Division; MG Henry Heth | Archer's and Walker's Brigade BG Henry H. Walker | Archer's Brigade: 13th Alabama; 1st Tennessee (Provisional Army); 7th Tennessee; 14th Tennessee; Walker's Brigade: 40th Virginia; 47th Virginia; 55th Virginia; 22nd Virginia Battalion |
| Heth's Division; MG Henry Heth | Kirkland's Brigade BG William W. Kirkland (w); Col Thomas C. Singletary | 11th North Carolina; 26th North Carolina; 44th North Carolina: Col Thomas C. Singletary; 47th North Carolina; 52nd North Carolina |
| Heth's Division; MG Henry Heth | Cooke's Brigade BG John R. Cooke (w); Col Edward D. Hall | 15th North Carolina; 27th North Carolina; 46th North Carolina: Col Edward D. Hall; 48th North Carolina |
| Wilcox's Division; MG Cadmus M. Wilcox | Lane' s Brigade BG James H. Lane | 7th North Carolina; 18th North Carolina; 28th North Carolina; 33rd North Carolina; 37th North Carolina |
| Wilcox's Division; MG Cadmus M. Wilcox | McGowan's Brigade BG Abner M. Perrin | 1st South Carolina (Provisional Army); 1st South Carolina (Orr's Rifles); 12th South Carolina; 13th South Carolina; 14th South Carolina |
| Wilcox's Division; MG Cadmus M. Wilcox | Thomas' Brigade BG Edward L. Thomas | 14th Georgia; 35th Georgia; 45th Georgia; 49th Georgia |
| Wilcox's Division; MG Cadmus M. Wilcox | Scales' Brigade BG Alfred M. Scales | 13th North Carolina; 16th North Carolina; 22nd North Carolina; 34th North Carolina; 38th North Carolina |
| Artillery; Col R. Lindsay Walker | Cutts' Battalion Ltc Allen S. Cutts | Irwin (Georgia) Battery; Patterson's (Georgia) Battery; Ross' (Georgia) Battery |
| Artillery; Col R. Lindsay Walker | McIntosh' s Battalion Maj David G. McIntosh | Hardaway (Alabama) Artillery; Danville (Virginia) Artillery; Johnson's (Virginia) Battery; 2nd Rockbridge (Virginia) Artillery |
| Artillery; Col R. Lindsay Walker | Garnett's Battalion Ltc John J. Garnett | Donaldsonville (Louisiana) Artillery; Moore's Company (Virginia) Artillery; Lewis (Virginia) Artillery; Norfolk (Virginia) Blues Artillery |
| Artillery; Col R. Lindsay Walker | Pegram's Battalion Maj William R. J. Pegram | Pee Dee (South Carolina) Artillery; Crenshaw (Virginia) Battery; Fredericksburg (Virginia) Artillery; Letcher (Virginia) Artillery; Purcell (Virginia) Artillery |
| Artillery; Col R. Lindsay Walker | Poague's Battalion Ltc William T. Poague | Madison (Mississippi) Artillery; Graham's (North Carolina) Artillery; Albemarle (Virginia) Artillery; Brooke's (Virginia) Battery |

=== Cavalry Corps ===
MG J. E. B. Stuart

| Division | Brigade | Regiments and others |
|---|---|---|
| Hampton's Division; MG J. E. B. Stuart | Gordon's Brigade BG James B. Gordon (w) | 1st North Carolina: Col Thomas Ruffin (k), Maj Rufus Barringer (w), Cpt William H. H. Cowles; 2nd North Carolina; 4th North Carolina: Col Dennis D. Ferebee (w); 5th North Carolina |
| Hampton's Division; MG J. E. B. Stuart | Butler's Brigade BG Pierce M. B. Young | 1st South Carolina: Ltc John D. Twiggs; 2nd South Carolina: Col Thomas J. Lipscomb; Cobb's (Georgia) Legion; Phillips (Georgia) Legion; Jeff. Davis (Mississippi) Legion: Ltc Joseph F. Waring |
| Hampton's Division; MG J. E. B. Stuart | Jones' Brigade Col Oliver R. Funsten; BG Thomas L. Rosser | 7th Virginia: Ltc Thomas Marshall; 11th Virginia: Ltc Mottrom D. Ball; 12th Virginia: Ltc Thomas B. Massie |
| Fitzhugh Lee's Division; MG Fitzhugh Lee | William H. F. Lee's Brigade Col John R. Chambliss Jr. | 9th Virginia: Maj Thomas Waller (w); 10th Virginia; 13th Virginia: Maj Joseph E. Gillette (w) |
| Fitzhugh Lee's Division; MG Fitzhugh Lee | Lomax's Brigade BG Lunsford L. Lomax | 1st Maryland Battalion: Ltc Ridgely Brown; 5th Virginia: Col Thomas L. Rosser, Ltc Henry C. Pate; 6th Virginia: Col Julian Harrison (w), Ltc John S. Green; 15th Virginia: Maj Charles R. Collins |
| Fitzhugh Lee's Division; MG Fitzhugh Lee | Wickham's Brigade Col Thomas H. Owen | 1st Virginia: Col Richard W. Carter; 2nd Virginia; 3rd Virginia: Ltc William R. Carter; 4th Virginia: Cpt William B. Newton (k), Cpt Robert Randolph |
| Horse Artillery | Beckham's Battalion Maj Robert F. Beckham | Breathed's (Virginia) Battery; Chew's (Virginia) Battery; Griffin's (Maryland) Battery; Hart's (South Carolina) Battery; McGregor's (Virginia) Battery; Moorman's (Virginia) Battery |

=== Reserve Artillery ===
BG William N. Pendleton

| Division | Battalions | Batteries |
|---|---|---|
| First Corps Artillery | Cabell's Battalion Col Henry C. Cabell | Fraser (Georgia) Battery; Troup (Georgia) Artillery; Manly's (North Carolina) Battery; 1st Richmond (Virginia) Howitzers |
| First Corps Artillery | Haskell's Battalion Maj John C. Haskell | Branch (North Carolina) Artillery; Rowan (North Carolina) Artillery; Palmetto South Carolina Artillery |
