= Jeremiah Z. Brown =

Jeremiah Zachariah Brown
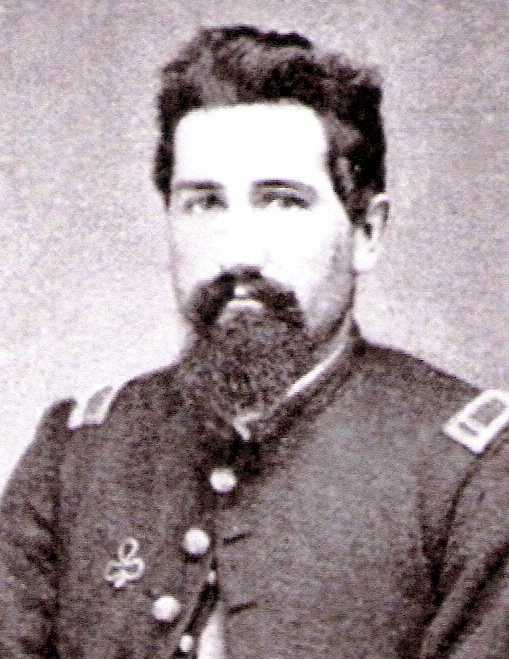
- Born: November 7, 1839; Rural Valley, Pennsylvania, US
- Died: February 19, 1916 (aged 76); Pennsylvania, US
- Burial place: Squirrel Hill Cemetery, New Bethlehem, Clarion County, Pennsylvania, US
- Military career
- Allegiance: United States
- Branch: United States Army
- Service years: 1862 - 1865
- Rank: Captain; Brevet Major
- Unit: 148th Regiment Pennsylvania Volunteer Infantry - Company K
- Awards: Medal of Honor

Captain Jeremiah Zachariah Brown (November 7, 1839 – February 19, 1916) was a Union soldier who fought in the American Civil War with the 148th Pennsylvania Infantry. He was one of four members of the regiment to receive the Medal of Honor, the United States' the highest award for bravery during combat.

Brown joined the army from Rimersburg, Pennsylvania in September 1862, and was commissioned as an officer the next year. He was mustered out in June 1865.
