= Tucson Sentinel =

Nonprofit online newspaper in Arizona, US

- "a smarter Tucson is a better Tucson"
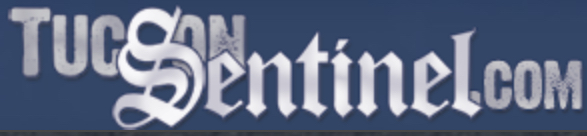
- Type: Nonprofit online newspaper
- Founder(s): Dylan Smith; Michael Truelsen
- Publisher: Dylan Smith
- Editor: Dylan Smith
- Staff writers: Paul Ingram; Blake Morlock; Jim Nintzel; Maria Coxon-Smith; Gene Moreland; Mia Kortright; Julie Jennings Patterson; Ted Prezelski
- Founded: 2009; 17 years ago
- Headquarters: Tucson, Arizona, United States
- OCLC number: 1002000067
- Website: www.tucsonsentinel.com

The Tucson Sentinel is a nonprofit online newspaper in Tucson, founded in 2009 and began publishing full-time in January 2010, with a focus on Arizona and regional news.

== History ==
The Sentinel was founded in 2009 after the shutdown in May 2009 of the Tucson Citizen, a 138-year-old afternoon daily newspaper that was closed by the Gannett Company newspaper chain.

The founder of the nonprofit news site, Dylan Smith, had been the online editor for the Tucson Citizen.

It began publishing full-time in January 2010, with an emphasis on local politics and public policy issues, including the border and immigration. The site was one of the initial wave of local independent online news sites to spring up around the country as daily newspapers endured layoffs and closures. The site is among hundreds of startup local news organizations across the country founded to fill the gaps left by declining print newsrooms.

Smith was among the founders of the Local Independent Online News Publishers (LION Publishers) group in 2012, and has served as the chairman of the board of that national nonprofit organization. LION Publishers has grown to include more than 200 CEO/owners of locally focused independent news sites.

The Sentinel joined the Investigative News Network (now the Institute for Nonprofit News) in 2011. That group is an organization of now more than a national organization of more than 200 nonprofit, nonpartisan news organizations that produce high-quality journalism.

== Funding ==
The Sentinel is a nonprofit organization that generates revenue in the form of sponsorships, reader donations, and local display advertising.

The nonprofit has received grants from the Ethics and Excellence in Journalism Foundation, Fund for Investigative Journalism, and the Knight Foundation/INN.

== Awards and recognition ==
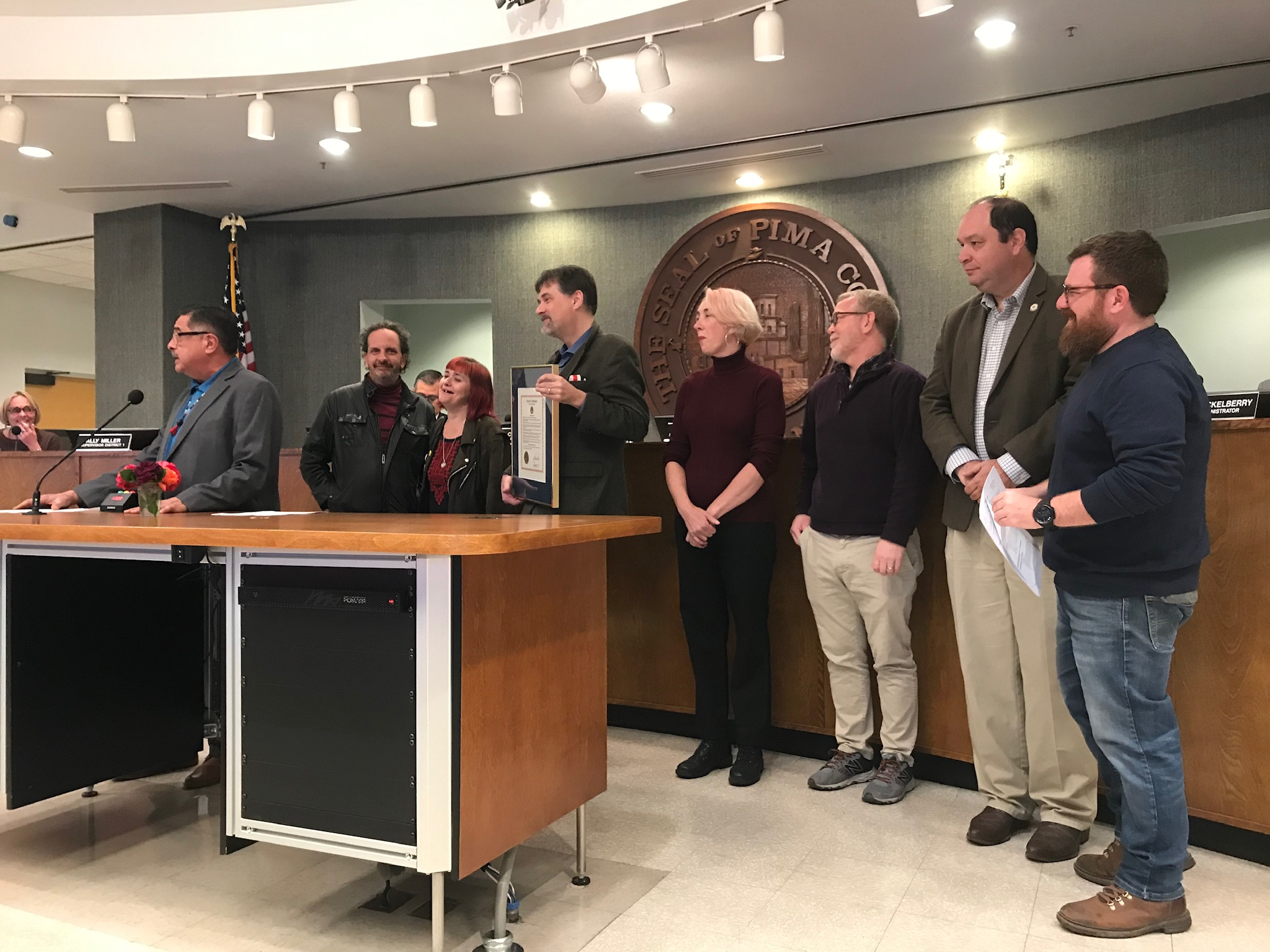
Staff from Tucson Sentinel presented with a plaque proclaiming 22 January 2020 to be "TucsonSentinel.com Day" from the Pima County Board of Supervisors; Left to right, Supervisor Richard Elias, columnist Blake Morlock, music columnist Julie Jennings Patterson, Editor & Publisher Dylan Smith (holding proclamation), editor Maria Coxon-Smith; one of the co-founders of the Sentinel, former news editor Michael Truelsen, 'Tucson Legend of Soccer' Ted Prezelski and senior reporter Paul Ingram

Investigative reporting and analysis published by the Sentinel has won state and national awards.

Blake Morlock, author of the "What the Devil won't tell you" columns that analyze local public affairs, was named as the first-place winner of the 2017 Community Column Writing award by the Arizona Press Club. The contest judge Martin Salazar, an editorial writer for the Albuquerque Journal.

Reporters Paul Ingram and Joe Watson jointly won 2017 Arizona Press Club awards in both the Community and Statewide divisions for their August 2017 story "Decorated Marine vet may be deported, despite likely U.S. citizenship." Ingram, a senior border and political reporter for the Sentinel, and Watson, a freelancer working with the Sentinel, were awarded second place for Community Immigration Reporting, and third place for Statewide Immigration Reporting for their efforts on the story. The judge was Richard Marosi, a longtime border reporter at the Los Angeles Times and two-time Pulitzer finalist.

Dylan Smith was a first runner-up in the Arizona Press Club's 2017 Community Journalist of the Year competition.

Dylan Smith was named as a 2017 winner of the annual Sledgehammer Award by the Arizona Press Club for his work pushing government officials to release information.

Paul Ingram won a 2017 national award for his photojournalism, receiving an honorable mention from the Institute for Nonprofit News in the Impact Prize for Nonprofit News Photography contest. He was one of just seven photographers seven journalists working for nonprofit news organizations to be recognized with an INN award, which he received for his 2017 picture of a teenage boy sprinting away from the Nogales border wall that separates the U.S. and Mexico, just after illegally climbing over the barrier with a ladder from the sister city of Nogales, Sonora.

In recognition of the fifth anniversary of the site beginning full-time publishing, Tucson Mayor Jonathan Rothschild proclaimed Thursday, January 22, 2015, as TucsonSentinel.com Day.
