= Pierton W. Dooner =

Pierton W. Dooner (1844–1907) was a Canadian-born American writer and newspaper editor. His work of speculative fiction Last Days of the Republic (1880) predicted the downfall of the United States in the early 20th century, due in part to the 'Yellow Peril'. His Christian name is sometimes given as Pierson.

== See also ==
- Weekly Arizonian
