= Tucson Citizen =

Former Arizona newspaper

- Type: Daily newspaper
- Format: Broadsheet
- Owner: Gannett
- Founder(s): Richard C. McCormick; John Wasson
- Founded: 1870
- Ceased publication: May 16, 2009 (print); January 31, 2014 (online)
- Language: English
- Headquarters: 4850 South Park Avenue; Tucson, Arizona 85714; United States
- Circulation: 17,000 (May 2009)
- ISSN: 0888-5478
- Website: tucsoncitizen.com

The Tucson Citizen was a daily newspaper published in Tucson, Arizona, from 1870 to 2009. At the time of its closure, the Citizen was the oldest continuously published newspaper in the state.

The Citizen published as Tucson's afternoon paper, six days per week except Sunday, when only the morning Arizona Daily Star was published as part of the two papers' joint operating agreement.

== History ==
On October 15, 1870, publisher Richard C. McCormick with editor John Wasson published the first edition of the Arizona Citizen. McCormick had originally been the owner of the Arizonan. However, when the editor of the Arizonan refused to support McCormick's re-election as congressional delegate for the territory of Arizona, McCormick took the press and started the Citizen with Wasson. During the mid-1880s, the newspaper was known as the Tucson Weekly Citizen. Allan Brown Jaynes was owner, manager and editor of the Tucson Citizen between 1901 and 1920. He was very involved in the statehood of Arizona and is in the Arizona Newspaper Hall of Fame.

In 1935, owner Frank Harris Hitchcock died. His estate then sold the paper to William H. Johnson and William A. Small. In 1958, Johnson sold out to Small, who retired in 1966 and was succeeded by his son, William A. Small Jr. In 1976, Gannett acquired the Citizen from the Small family for $30 million in company stock.

In January 2009, Gannett announced it would close the Citizen by March 21 if a buyer were not found, though on March 17, 2009, Gannett announced the paper would remain open past that closing date because it was in negotiations with two potential buyers. However, those negotiations did not bear fruit, and on May 15, 2009, Gannett announced that the final print edition would appear the following day, and that the Citizen would thereafter be an Internet publication. The last print edition was delivered on May 16, 2009. When it ceased printing, the daily circulation was approximately 17,000, down from a high of 60,000 in the 1960s.

== Successors ==
The successor site, TucsonCitizen.com, edited by the paper's former assistant city editor, Mark B. Evans, described itself as "a compendium of blogs . . . written by Tucsonans for Tucsonans. The bloggers and citizen journalists here provide news, information, opinion, commentary and perspective on the issues, interests and events that affect daily life in the Old Pueblo." It was a division of Gannett Company, Inc., and a partner of Tucson Newspapers. The site closed on January 31, 2014.

Several former Citizen staffers founded TucsonSentinel.com, a nonprofit online news site, after the newspaper was closed.
