= William A. Harn =

American Civil War Union Army officer

- Born: 1833; Philadelphia, Pennsylvania, U.S.
- Died: May 31, 1889 (aged 55–56); St. Augustine, Florida, U.S.
- Burial place: Evergreen Cemetery
- Military career
- Allegiance: United States of America; Union
- Branch: United States Army; Union Army
- Service years: 1854–1865
- Commands: 3rd New York Independent Light Artillery
- Conflicts: American Civil War; Battle of Gettysburg

William A. Harn (1833-1889) was an American soldier who commanded a New York artillery battery in the American Civil War.

== Early life ==
William Harn was born in either 1833 or 1834 in Philadelphia, Pennsylvania.

== Career ==
=== Formation of the 3rd New York Battery ===
The 3rd New York Battery began its existence as Company D of the 2nd New York State Militia Regiment. It was designated a howitzer company. It was sent to Washington, D.C., with the regiment, which became the 82nd New York Volunteer Infantry Regiment. Led by Captain Thaddeus P. Mott, the company left New York State on May 19, 1861. Shortly after the regiment was mustered into federal service on June 17, the company was detached and organized as a battery of light artillery. On December 7, 1861, the unit was designated the 3rd New York Independent Battery.

The battery served in the defenses of Washington until March 17, 1862, when it was sent south to serve in the Peninsula Campaign. The battery was assigned to Brig. Gen. William F. Smith's division of the Army of the Potomac in January of that year, and the division had joined the IV Corps in March 1862. The division joined the VI Corps when it was formed in May 1862. It first saw combat under Capt. Mott at the Battle of Yorktown, and it was heavily engaged in the Battle of Williamsburg. The battery was engaged during the Seven Days Battles, including at the Battle of White Oak Swamp and the Battle of Malvern Hill. Mott resigned soon thereafter. Lt. William Stuart was in command in the Maryland campaign, in which the battery served with the division of Brig. Gen. Darius N. Couch

=== Battery leadership ===
Harn took charge of the battery late in 1862, commanding it in the division of Brig. Gen. Albion Howe at the Battle of Fredericksburg. Harn previously had been a lieutenant in the 1st New York Light Artillery Regiment. Commissioned first lieutenant of Battery E on March 1, 1862, Harn had moved to Battery G on April 13 of the same year. He transferred to the 3rd New York Independent Battery in late 1862 but was not commissioned captain until April 13, 1863.

Under Harn's command, the battery served with the Light Division of Col. Hiram Burnham at the Second Battle of Fredericksburg and the Battle of Salem Church. In the artillery brigade of VI Corps, the 3rd New York served at the Battle of Gettysburg. The Battery then participated in the Bristoe campaign, especially at the Second Battle of Rappahannock Station, and at the Battle of Mine Run.

Harn's battery remained in VI Corps in 1864, participating in the Overland Campaign. It then participated in the siege of Petersburg, not campaigning with Maj. Gen. Philip Sheridan in the campaign of the Army of the Shenandoah. When the VI Corps returned to the Petersburg front, Harn's battery rejoined its artillery brigade. In that formation, it participated in the Third Battle of Petersburg and in breaking a Confederate attack at the Battle of Sailor's Creek during the Appomattox campaign.

Captain Harn was dismissed from the service on April 5, 1864, but he was reinstated on April 20. Harn received a brevet major appointment for his actions at the Battle of Spotsylvania Court House and the Richmond-Petersburg campaign. He was mustered out on June 24, 1865.

== Later life ==
Harn became the keeper of a lighthouse, St. Augustine Light in Florida, beginning October 1875. The keeper's house was constructed during his tenure at the lighthouse. The Harns earned a reputation for hospitality, including by serving lemonade to visitors. William Harn died of Tuberculosis on May 31, 1889, at the age of 55 and was buried in Evergreen Cemetery, Saint Augustine.

The monument to Harn's battery in the Gettysburg National Military Park, on the Taneytown Road, was made by the Smith Granite Company.
