= Weekly Arizonian =

Newspaper in Tucson, Arizona (1859 to 1871)

- Type: Weekly newspaper
- Founder: Edward Ephraim Cross
- Founded: 1859
- Ceased publication: 1871
- Language: English
- Headquarters: Tucson, Arizona

The Weekly Arizonian was a newspaper published in Arizona Territory with a checkered existence from 1859 to 1871. It was the first printed work, first newspaper and first political organ in the state.

== Political background ==
After the Mexican war which resulted in much of northern Mexico being ceded to the United States, New Mexico Territory – encompassing what later became the States of Arizona and New Mexico – was organized in 1850 with the capital at Santa Fe. In 1853 the Gadsden Purchase added a major strip to the southwest corner of the Territory, including two of the northernmost presidios of the re poor, and the Santa Fe government had little impact on this part of the territory. Arizonans wanted rule of law and better protection from the Apaches.

== Founding of the newspaper, 1859 ==
It was in this setting that the Weekly Arizonian made its debut at Tubac on 3 March 1859. From its first issue, the Arizonian's avowed policy was to promote the resources of the area, and secure a separate government for Arizona. It was a four-page tabloid printed on a Washington hand press. The press had been shipped from Ohio by William Wrightson of the Santa Rita Mining Company. It had traveled by ship down the Ohio and Mississippi Rivers, across the Gulf to Panama, through the Sea of Cortez to Guaymas, and thence by ox-cart to Tubac. It took about two months to set up shop for the newspaper. Edward Ephraim Cross, who had journalistic experience in Cincinnati, assumed the mantel of editor. He had been in Tubac since November 1858, and had been sending dispatches to Eastern newspapers. He was virtually the sole source of information about Arizona to the outside world.

Cross soon ran afoul of Sylvester Mowry, the most prominent citizen in Tubac, the bone of contention being Mowry's allegedly exaggerated population estimates of Arizona and the territory's presumed agricultural potential. Mowry had recently retired from the Army at Fort Yuma, and was twice elected as delegate to Washington for the proposed territory of Arizona, but Congress, not recognizing Arizona as an organized territory, refused to seat him. Cross and Mowry, who agreed on their aspirations for the development of Arizona, but represented rival mining interests, settled their differences in a bloodless duel on 8 July 1859.

Cross's aggressive editorial policy continued to bring political pressure on the mining company which owned the Arizonian. Sylvester Mowry and his friend William Oury purchased the newspaper for $2,500 on 21 July 1859. Cross lingered in Tubac for a while, but with the outbreak of the Civil War, he returned to his native New Hampshire, took a colonel's commission, and died of wounds at the battle of Gettysburg in 1863.

== Move to Tucson, 1859 ==
Upon purchase of the newspaper, Mowry moved the Arizonan to Tucson, where he envisioned it as a valuable tool in his drive for territorial organization and a delegate's seat in Congress. Tucson thus had its first newspaper on 4 August 1859. J. Howard Wells, the new editor, entered his job with some misgivings since he had no prior newspaper experience. But in November the paper expanded its operations with the procurement of a job printing office from San Francisco. In April 1860 this office published the Constitution of the Provisional Government of the Territory of Arizona, and the proceedings of the convention in Tucson. This was the first book published in Arizona. Two months later the newspaper suspended publication, perhaps due to Wells' other political commitments.

Charles Strong, a printer from New York, and T.M. Turner, a journalist from Ohio, entered into a six-month agreement to revive the Arizonan as publisher and editor respectively. Little is known of the paper's continued troubles, but Turner quit within a month and in his farewell issue advertised a pair of Pocket Derringers, apparently standard armament for editors in those days. He should have kept them, for he was murdered in Las Vegas six months later. The paper limped on without the financial support it had expected, and suspended publication a second time in September 1861.

== Civil War interlude ==
Six years later, the Arizonian was revived yet again, but in the meantime it had missed the opportunity to report the Civil War in New Mexico Territory, a colorful period during which the Confederacy organized an Arizona Territory with representation in the Richmond Congress. The region was subsequently invaded by General Carleton's California Column, which sent the Confederate forces fleeing to Texas. The Union forces arrived unopposed in Tucson on May 22, 1862, and paraded the press of the Arizonian through town as a war trophy. Its owner, Sylvester Mowry, was arrested for treason and imprisoned at Yuma. The charges were never proven, and after the war Congress awarded him $40,000 in compensation for all his losses, but he died a broken man in London in 1871. With all of New Mexico reincorporated into the Union, President Abraham Lincoln proclaimed the establishment of a new Territory of Arizona on February 23, 1863, carved from its western half. Tucson was regarded as a hotbed of secessionist sentiment and not suitable as territorial capital, so the town momentarily declined in political importance, and with it the ability to support a newspaper.

Although no newspaper was being published in Tucson, the press of the Arizonian was used in 1865 to publish the Territory's first known Spanish document, a translation of the Howell Code adopted by the First Legislature in 1864.

== Revival, 1867 ==
In June 1867 B.F Ritchie & Co. revived the newspaper from its six-year hiatus with a certain Mr. Pierce as editor. Pierce was reputed to be a drunkard, and the paper only lasted for three issues. He then moved to Prescott, the new capital, where he published one issue on 31 August 1867. He became ill, the newspaper ceased publication, and Pierce gave up any further attempt to keep the paper alive.

Meanwhile, the Washington hand press had remained in Tucson, and in August 1867 the Tucson Publishing Company started printing the Southern Arizonian with Sidney DeLong as editor. He had arrived with Carleton's troops in 1862, settled in Tucson in 1866, and would later be elected its first mayor. In the Fall of 1867 the Territorial capital moved to Tucson, assuring its newspaper of brighter prospects. The Washington hand press was retired and replaced with more modern equipment, and the newspaper was awarded the contract for printing all government documents. DeLong turned over the paper to H.W. Sherry in January 1869. Sherry immediately partnered with Pierson W. Dooner, a Canadian printer who took over as editor in April when Sherry left.

Dooner altered the image of the Southern Arizonian considerably, renaming it the Arizonan since he considered the old spelling an "unwarrantable construction." The paper still experienced financial difficulties, but when in September 1869 two issues failed to appear, it was not for lack of paper. Dooner, who served as editor, compositor and printer, had gone on a short adventure in the desert and the guide had become lost. Such a "free and easy" way of producing a newspaper drew satirical comment from as far away as Los Angeles. Territorial Delegate and former Governor Richard McCormick had in the meantime acquired an interest in the newspaper, and Dooner willingly served his political ambitions without ever having met him. When they did meet in October 1870, Dooner turned against his patron. In revenge, McCormick removed the new equipment, but Dooner put the old Tubac press back in operation, having previously assured McCormick it was unsalvageable. Four days later a new newspaper appeared Tucson, the Citizen, edited by John Wasson, and supporting McCormick's candidacy for re-election.

== Demise, 1871 ==
A bitter war ensued between the two newspapers. Tucson was not big enough at the time to support two newspapers, and it became apparent that the election would decide which newspaper survived. During the campaign McCormick was the subject of the first political cartoon in Arizona. He won the election on November 8, sealing the fate of the Arizonian. Dooner continued casting aspersions on Wasson and the Citizen, but finally on April 29, 1871, he ceased publishing, and the Arizonian was no more.

The old Tubac press which had inaugurated the history of printing in Arizona went on to launch the Tucson Arizona Star in 1877, the Tombstone Nugget in 1879 and the Tombstone Epitaph in 1880. In 1933 the Epitaph editor donated the relic to the Arizona Historical Society in Tucson, and the press was later put on display at the Tubac Presidio State Historic Park. In 1959 Frank Giffen printed four centennial commemorative issues of the Arizonian which were mailed from Tubac. In 1957 Edward Cross was inducted into the Arizona Newspapers Association Hall of Fame, as was Pierson Dooner in 1996. In 2012, the national Society of Professional Journalists declared the Washington Hand Press on which the Arizonian was first printed and the surrounding Tubac Presidio State Historic Park as a Historic Site in Journalism.

== Editors ==
Edward E. Cross	3 March 1859
J. Howard Wells	4 August 1859
suspended publication	14 June 1860
T.M. Turner	9 February 1861
suspended publication	9 September 1861
Mr. Pierce	15 June 1867
Sidney R. DeLong	August 1867
H.W. Sherry	1 January 1869
Pierson W. Dooner	24 April 1869
ceased publication	29 April 1871

== See also ==
- List of newspapers in Arizona

== Sources ==
- Alisky, Marvin. "Arizona's first newspaper, the Weekly Arizonian, 1859," New Mexico historical review, 34: 134–43 (April 1959).
- Hattich, William H. "Highlights of Arizona' first printing press," Arizona historical review, 3: 67–72 (October 1930).
- Hufford, Kenneth. "Journalism in pre-Territorial Arizona," Smoke signal, no. 14 (Fall 1966).
- Hufford, Kenneth. "P.W. Dooner, pioneer editor of Tucson," Arizona and the West, 10: 25–42 (Spring 1968).
- Luttrell, Estelle. "Newspapers and periodicals of Arizona 1859–1912," University of Arizona bulletin, 20:93-94 (July 1949).
- McMurtrie, Douglas. The Beginnings of printing in Arizona. (Chicago: Black Cat Press, 1937), pp. 40–42.
