= Edward E. Cross =

Union Army officer

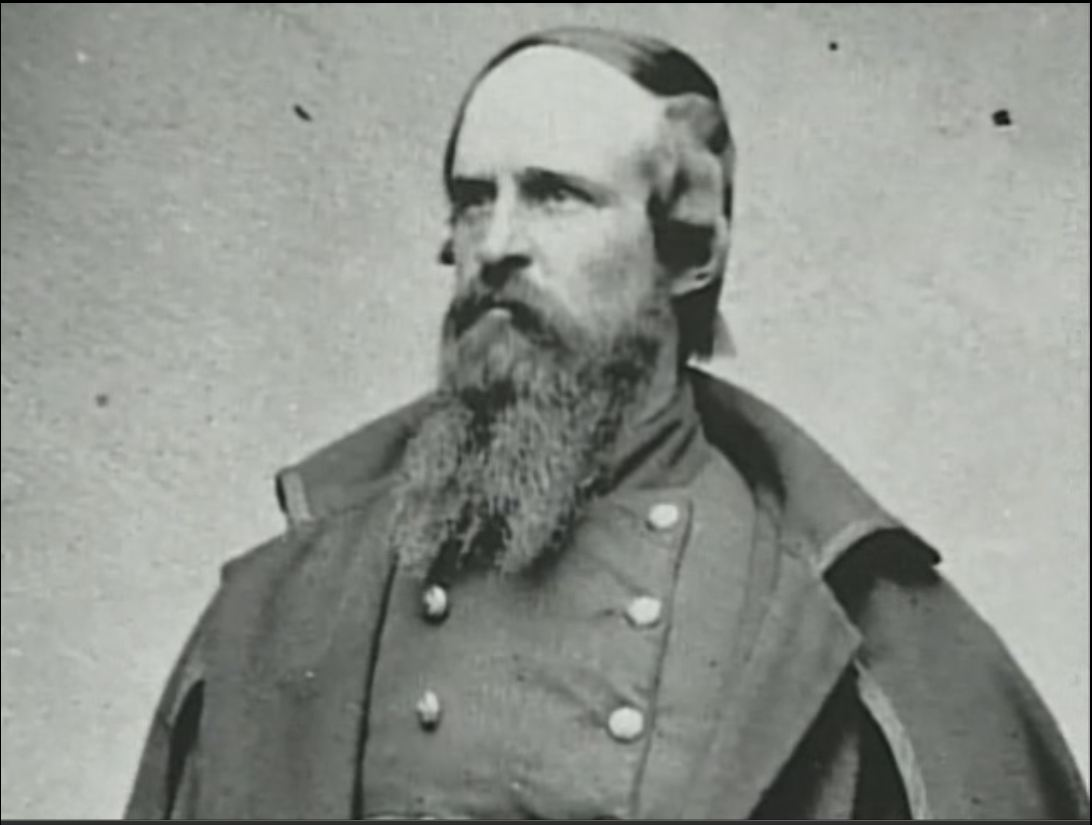
- Born: April 22, 1832; Lancaster, New Hampshire
- Died: July 3, 1863 (aged 31); Gettysburg, Pennsylvania
- Burial place: Lancaster, New Hampshire
- Military career
- Allegiance: United States of America; Union
- Branch: United States Army; Union Army
- Service years: 1860–63
- Rank: Colonel
- Commands: 5th New Hampshire Volunteer Infantry
- Conflicts: Indian Wars; American Civil War: Battle of Antietam; Battle of Fredericksburg; Battle of Chancellorsville; Battle of Gettysburg

Edward Ephraim Cross (April 22, 1832 – July 3, 1863) was a newspaperman and an officer in the Union Army during the American Civil War.

== Journalist ==
Cross was born in Lancaster, New Hampshire, son of Ephram and Abigail (Everett) Cross; he attended the common school and academy at Lancaster. When he was fifteen years old, he began writing as a printer for a local newspaper, the Coos Democrat. He later moved from New Hampshire to Cincinnati, Ohio, where he worked as a printer for the Cincinnati Times. He demonstrated writing skills and became a reporter for the newspaper, serving for a while as the paper's Washington correspondent. In 1854, he canvassed Ohio for the American (Know-Nothing) Party, was the Washington correspondent for the Cincinnati Times during two sessions of Congress, and also wrote articles for other newspapers, including the New York Herald.

On July 27, 1858, he left Cincinnati for Tubac, Arizona Territory, with the last contingent of the Santa Rita Silver Mining Company.

Cross invested in a series of mines and then established the territory's first newspaper, the Weekly Arizonian. He also served at times in the United States Army as a scout during occasional expeditions against the Apache. In 1860, he crossed the border into Mexico to command a Sonoran army garrison supporting the insurgency of Benito Juárez.

On August 5, 1860, Colonel Cross, assigned to Fort Buchanan, presided over a meeting of irate miners, at the ranch of Henry Theodore Titus, who demanded protection from depredations committed by Sonoran bandits. Cross enumerated the atrocities committed and paid a tribute of respect to the victims.

== Civil War service ==
At the outset of the Civil War, he was commissioned as colonel of the 5th New Hampshire Volunteer Infantry. He led his regiment in the first division II Corps, establishing a reputation as one of the hardest-fighting, toughest officers in the army. Serving with distinction in the Battle of Seven Pines (where he fell wounded) and the Seven Days Battles, he again was wounded at the Battle of Antietam. Cross also led his regiment at the Battle of Fredericksburg and the Battle of Chancellorsville. At Chancellorsville he briefly led an ad hoc fifth brigade in the 1st Division, II Corps.

During the Battle of Gettysburg, he led a brigade in 1st Division, II Corps. On July 2, 1863, the division was sent to the left flank to help stabilize it after the Confederates had begun attacking the salient formed by III Corps. Cross's brigade was formed on the left of the division's battle line as it entered the Wheatfield. During the fighting, Cross was mortally wounded while at the left of his line near the Rose Woods. The monument of the 5th New Hampshire is said to mark the spot where he fell. Cross died the following day at a field hospital, the George Spangler Farm. Ever the popular commander, his last words were "I think the boys will miss me." His body was transported home to Lancaster, New Hampshire, for burial in the town's cemetery.

Col H. Boyd McKeen of the 81st Pennsylvania Regiment succeeded to command of the brigade.

== Reputation ==
Cross was an impulsive and colorful officer. He is reported to have struck non-commissioned officers with the flat of his sword when angry. When leading his regiment into action at Seven Pines, he told the troops "Charge like hell! Show them you are damn Yankees!"

During the Gettysburg campaign, Cross's regiment broke formation so they could move single file over a narrow bridge. When he saw this, he ordered his men to go back and to ford the creek in proper column formation. This caused the soldiers' leather shoes to be wet for some time after.

Cross was notable for always wearing a red bandanna on his head rather than the traditional officer's hat. This was Cross's way of making it easier for his men to locate him quickly on the battlefield. However, on July 2, 1863, Maj. Gen. Winfield S. Hancock noticed that his bandanna was black rather than red. Col. Cross indicated that he had foreseen his own death this day and that black was more appropriate. That morning, he had also looked over some ambulances behind the lines and remarked "We shan't want any of your death wagons today."
