= 3rd New York Independent Light Artillery =

3rd Independent Battery, New York Volunteer Light Artillery
- Active: December 7, 1861 - June 24, 1865
- Country: United States
- Allegiance: Union
- Branch: Artillery
- Engagements: First Battle of Bull Run; Siege of Yorktown; Seven Days Battles; Battle of Garnett's & Golding's Farm; Battle of Savage's Station; Battle of White Oak Swamp; Battle of Glendale; Battle of Malvern Hill; Battle of South Mountain; Battle of Antietam; Battle of Fredericksburg; Battle of Chancellorsville; Battle of Gettysburg (reserve); Bristoe Campaign; Mine Run Campaign; Battle of the Wilderness; Battle of Spotsylvania Court House; Battle of North Anna; Battle of Totopotomoy Creek; Battle of Cold Harbor; Siege of Petersburg; Battle of Jerusalem Plank Road; Appomattox Campaign; Battle of Sailor's Creek; Battle of Appomattox Court House

The 3rd Independent Battery, New York Volunteer Light Artillery or New York Independent Light Artillery was an artillery battery that served in the Union Army during the American Civil War.

== Service ==
The battery was originally organized as Company D, 2nd Regiment New York State Militia Infantry, which was re-designated as the 82nd New York Volunteer Infantry Regiment. It was then detached from the regiment and known as Battery B, New York Artillery, until December 7, 1861, when it was officially re-designated 3rd New York Battery. The battery was organized at New York City and mustered in at Washington, D.C. for a three-year enlistment on June 17, 1862, and shortly after detached and converted into a light artillery battery under the command of Captain Thaddeus P. Mott.

The battery was attached to Schenck's Brigade, Tyler's Division, McDowell's Army of Northeastern Virginia, June to August 1861. W. F. Smith's Brigade, Division of the Potomac, to October 1861. Hancock's Brigade, Smith's Division, Army of the Potomac, to March 1862. Smith's 2nd Division, IV Corps, Army of the Potomac, to May 1862. Artillery, 2nd Division, VI Corps, to September 1862. Artillery, 3rd Division, VI Corps, to November 1862. Artillery, 2nd Division, VI Corps, to January 1863. Artillery, Light Division, VI Corps, to May 1863. Artillery, 2nd Division, VI Corps, to June 1863. Artillery Brigade, VI Corps, to July 10, 1864. Artillery Reserve, Army of the Potomac, to December 1864. Artillery Brigade, VI Corps, to June 1865.

The 3rd New York Light Artillery mustered out of service on June 24, 1865.

== Detailed service ==
Left New York for Washington, D.C., May 18, 1861. Duty in the defenses of Washington, D. C., until July 1861. Advanced on Manassas, Va., July 16–21. First Battle of Bull Run July 21. Duty in the defenses of Washington until March 1862. Reconnaissance's to Lewinsville September 11 and September 25, 1861. Ordered to Fort Monroe, Va., March 23, 1862. Siege of Yorktown April 5-May 4. Lee's Mills April 16. Battle of Williamsburg May 5. Seven Days before Richmond June 25-July 1. Garnett's and Golding's Farms June 27–28. Savage's Station June 29. White Oak Swamp and Glendale June 30. Malvern Hill July 1. At Harrison's Landing until August 16. Moved to Fort Monroe, then to Alexandria August 16–24. Maryland Campaign September 6–22. Crampton's Pass, South Mountain, September 14. Lee's Mills September 16. Battle of Antietam September 16–17. At Hagerstown, Md., until October 29. Movement to Falmouth, Va., October 29-November 19. Battle of Fredericksburg, Va., December 12–15. "Mud March" January 20–24, 1863. At Falmouth until April 1863. Chancellorsville Campaign April 27-May 6. Operations at Franklin's Crossing April 29-May 2. Maryes Heights, Fredericksburg, May 8. Salem Heights May 3–4. Deep Run Crossing June 5–13. Battle of Gettysburg July 2–4. Fairfield, Pa., July 5. Funkstown, Md., July 10–13. On line of the Rappahannock and Rapidan until October. Bristoe Campaign October 9–22. Advance to line of the Rappahannock November 7–8. Rappahannock Station November 7. Mine Run Campaign November 26-December 2. Campaign from the Rapidan to the James May 3-June 15, 1864. Battle of the Wilderness May 5–7. Spotsylvania May 8–12. Spotsylvania Court House May 12–21. Assault on the Salient, "Bloody Angle," May 12. North Anna River May 23–26. On line of the Pamunkey May 26–28. Totopotomoy May 28–31. Cold Harbor June 1–12. Before Petersburg June 18–19. Siege of Petersburg June 18, 1864, to April 2, 1865. Jerusalem Plank Road, Weldon Railroad, June 22–23, 1864. Fort Fisher, Petersburg, March 25, 1865. Appomattox Campaign March 28-April 9. Assault and capture of Petersburg April 2. Sailor's Creek April 6. High Bridge May 7. Appomattox Court House April 9. Surrender of Lee and his army. Moved to Danville April 23–27. Duty there until May 18. Moved to Richmond, then to Washington, D.C., May 18-June 2. Corps review June 8.

== Casualties ==
The battery lost a total of 18 men during service; 14 enlisted men killed or mortally wounded, 4 enlisted men died of disease.

== Commanders ==
- Captain Thaddeus P. Mott
- Captain William Stuart
- Captain William A. Harn

== See also ==
- List of New York Civil War regiments
- New York in the Civil War
