= H. Boyd McKeen =

American Civil War officer and brigade commander (1835–1864)

Henry Boyd McKeen
- Born: Henry Boyd McKeen; September 18, 1835; Philadelphia, Pennsylvania, U.S.
- Died: June 3, 1864 (aged 28); Hanover County, Virginia, U.S.
- Military career
- Allegiance: United States; Union
- Branch: United States Army; Union Army
- Rank: Colonel
- Commands: 81st Pennsylvania Infantry Regiment (1862-1864); 1st Brigade, 2nd Division, II Corps (1864)
- Conflicts: American Civil War: Battle of Antietam; Battle of Fredericksburg; Battle of Gettysburg; Battle of Bristoe Station; Battle of the Wilderness; Battle of Cold Harbor †
- Other work: lumber merchant

Henry Boyd McKeen (September 18, 1835 – June 3, 1864) was an officer and brigade commander in the union army during the American Civil War. He was killed in the Battle of Cold Harbor.

== Biography ==
H. Boyd McKeen was a native of Philadelphia, Pennsylvania, and a graduate of Princeton University, class of 1853. He was a lumber merchant in Camden, New Jersey, at the beginning of the War. He began the war as a First Lieutenant and Adjutant of the 81st Pennsylvania Infantry Regiment, commissioned on October 27, 1861. McKeen was promoted to the rank of major on June 1, 1862, during the Peninsula Campaign. As major he led the regiment in first division II Corps at the Battle of Antietam. Promoted to colonel in November 1862, McKeen commanded the regiment at the Battle of Fredericksburg and the Battle of Chancellorsville. He was wounded in both battles. (The 81st Pennsylvania served in the temporary fifth brigade first division II Corps at Chancellorsville.)

McKeen entered the Battle of Gettysburg still commanding 81st Pennsylvania. Col Edward E. Cross, commander of the brigade, also gave him responsibility for the 148th Pennsylvania Infantry. When Cross was mortally wounded on July 2, 1863, in the Wheatfield, Col McKeen became acting commander of his brigade. McKeen wrote the official report of the brigade's actions at Gettysburg. He records his command's role on the third day of the battle, watching the repulse of the Florida brigade under David Lang. The regiment’s memorial stands in the Wheatfield, where it did its hardest fighting. Col McKeen was back in regimental command at the Battle of Bristoe Station and the Mine Run Campaign. During an absence of Col Nelson Miles, McKeen led the brigade once more during the winter of 1863-1864.

Col McKeen also led the 81st Pennsylvania at the Battle of the Wilderness. When BG Alexander S. Webb was wounded at the Battle of Spotsylvania, McKeen was assigned command of his brigade in second division II Corps. Col McKeen was mortally wounded, shot through the body, in the Battle of Cold Harbor on June 3, 1864, leading a charge. His brigade had been in the second line of BG John Gibbon's second division at the beginning of the assault, but the brigade in front of it had been driven to seek cover by heavy fire. McKeen's command had tried unsuccessfully to go forward under the same fire.

McKeen is buried in The Woodlands Cemetery in Philadelphia.

Fort McKeen in Dakota Territory was named in his honor when it was established in 1872. It was later renamed Fort Abraham Lincoln.
