= John Rogers Cooke =

Confederate Army general (1833–1891)

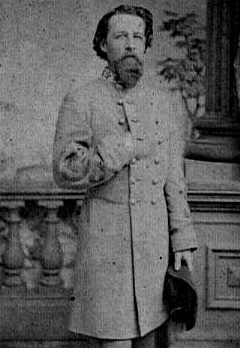
- Born: June 9, 1833; Jefferson Barracks, Missouri, US
- Died: April 10, 1891 (aged 57); Richmond, Virginia, US
- Burial place: Hollywood Cemetery, Richmond, Virginia
- Military career
- Allegiance: United States; Confederate States of America
- Branch: US Army; Confederate States Army
- Service years: 1855–1861 (USA); 1861–1865 (CSA)
- Rank: First Lieutenant (USA); Brigadier General (CSA)
- Conflicts: American Civil War: Battle of Antietam; Battle of Fredericksburg; Battle of Bristoe Station; Battle of Spotsylvania Courthouse

John Rogers Cooke (June 9, 1833 – April 10, 1891) was a Confederate general during the American Civil War. He was the son of Union general Philip St. George Cooke and the brother-in-law of Confederate cavalry leader Jeb Stuart.

== Early and family life ==
The son of a career army officer, Philip St. George Cooke and his wife Rachel Wilt Herzog, Cooke was born at Jefferson Barracks, Missouri. He studied privately in Missouri, in Carlisle, Pennsylvania, Alexandria, Virginia, and engineering at Harvard College but never received a degree. Descended on his father's side from the First Families of Virginia, he shared his name with an uncle John Rogers Cooke (1788–1854) who served one term in the Virginia House of Delegates during the War of 1812 and figured prominently in the Virginia Constitutional Convention of 1829–1830. His sister Flora married another Army officer, who became Confederate Major General J.E.B. Stuart.

Cooke married Nannie G. Patton after the war, and had three sons (one of them sharing his name) and five daughters.

== Early career ==
After working on railroad construction in Missouri and Ohio, through his father's efforts, Cooke was commissioned into the United States Army in 1855 as a second lieutenant of the 8th U.S. Infantry Regiment. He served in the New Mexico Territory and in Texas. On January 28, 1861, Cooke was promoted to second lieutenant.

== Civil War ==
When Virginia seceded from the Union, in 1861 Cooke followed his brother-in-law, J.E.B. Stuart, to join the Confederate States Army. To his dismay, his father remained loyal to the Union, as did several relatives. Commissioned a first lieutenant in the Confederate Army, Cooke fought in the First Battle of Bull Run as an aide to Brigadier General Theophilus Hunter Holmes. In April 1862, he raised a company of light artillery and was elected colonel of the 27th North Carolina Infantry, receiving a promotion to Major and Chief of Artillery in the Department of North Carolina. Wounded at the Battle of Antietam, he recovered and received a promotion to brigadier general on November 1, 1862.

Leading a brigade at the Battle of Fredericksburg, Cooke was badly wounded by a bullet which fractured his skull. He was able to return to the field in April 1863. In October 1863, while commanding a brigade in A.P. Hill's corps, Cooke received another serious wound at the Battle of Bristoe Station during Hill's attack on the Union II Corps. His shattered shinbone took months to heal, and during his recovery Cooke served on military tribunal in Richmond. Upon returning to field duty, Cooke received another leg wound during the Battle of Spotsylvania, but remained on the field to lead an assault from horseback. In all, Cooke was wounded seven times during the Civil War. Cooke's brigade played a significant role in the Battle of Sutherland's Station, its resistance to Union attacks enabling other Confederate units to retreat.

== Post-War life ==
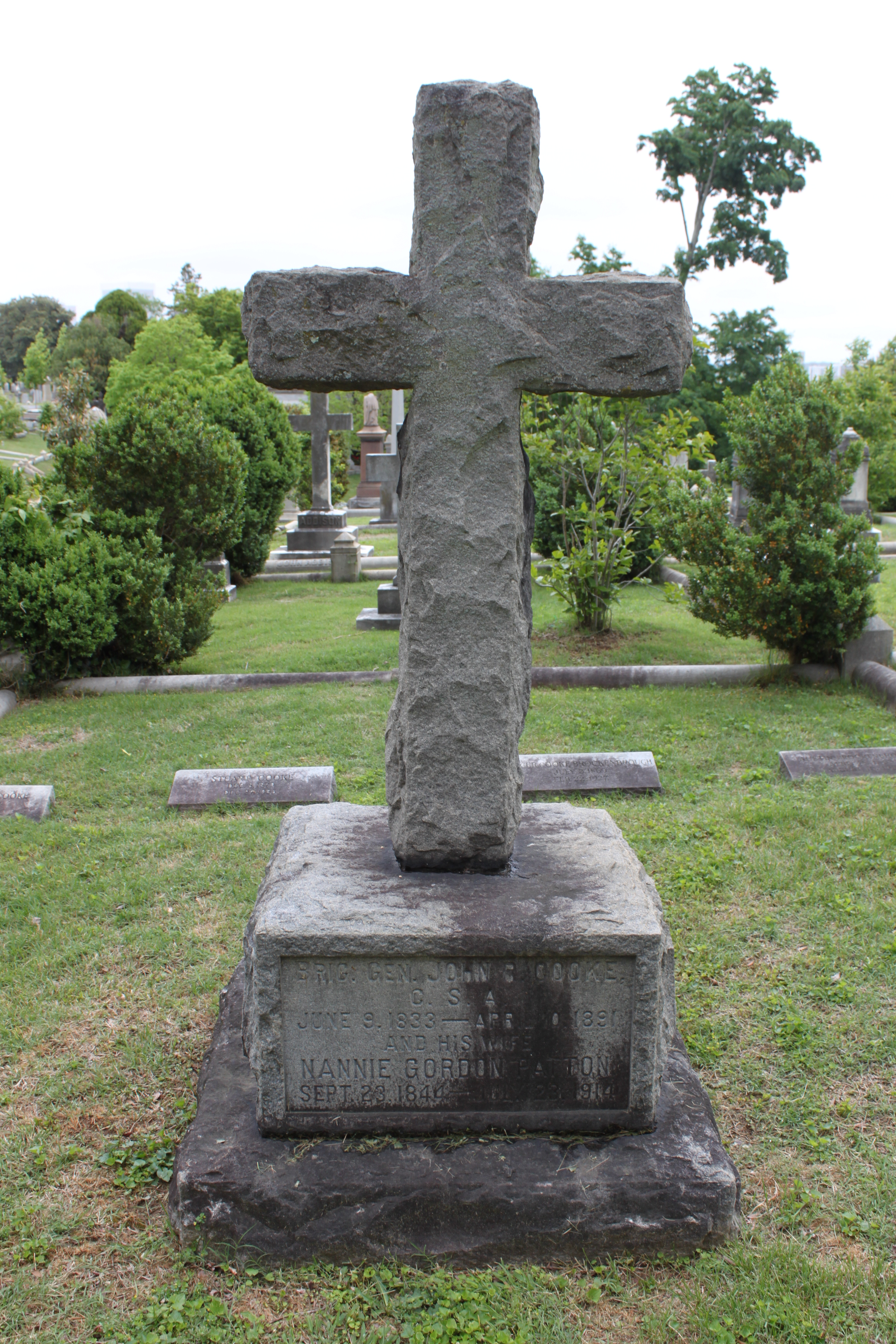
Grave of Cooke at Hollywood Cemetery

When the War ended, Cooke went to Richmond, and became a businessman. He helped found the Confederate Soldiers' Home in Richmond. The family breach with his father—who had stayed loyal to the Union—was healed some time after the end of the War. Cooke also was a member of the Southern Historical Society. Cooke died of pneumonia in Richmond, Virginia and is buried there in Hollywood Cemetery.

== See also ==
- List of American Civil War generals (Confederate)
