= 82nd New York Infantry Regiment =

- Active: May 20-June 7, 1861, to June 25, 1864
- Country: United States
- Allegiance: Union
- Branch: Infantry
- Nicknames: Second Regiment N. Y. S. Light Infantry, or State Guards
- Engagements: First Battle of Bull Run; Battle of Ball's Bluff; Battle of Yorktown (1862); Battle of Fair Oaks; Seven Days' Battles; Battle of Antietam; Battle of Fredericksburg; Battle of Chancellorsville; Battle of Gettysburg; Battle of Bristoe Station; Mine Run Campaign; Battle of the Wilderness; Battle of Spotsylvania Courthouse; Battle of Cold Harbor; Siege of Petersburg

Insignia
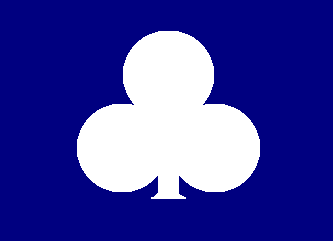
- 2nd Division, II Corps

The 82nd New York Infantry Regiment, the "Second Militia," "Second Regiment N. Y. S. Light Infantry," or "State Guards", was an infantry regiment of the Union Army during the American Civil War.

== Service ==
The 2d Regiment Militia failing to be ordered to the front under the first call, organized in New York City as a regiment of volunteers, Col. G. W. B-. Tompkins, under special authority from the War Department; and was mustered in the service of the United States for three years at Washington, D. C, between May 20 and June 17, 1861. Company A was mustered out and consolidated into the other companies' July 15, 1861; a new Company A joined in September, 1861; Company D, the howitzer company of the regiment, served mostly detached from it, until it was finally converted into the 3rd New York Independent Light Artillery, and, in September, 1861, was replaced by a new company. The regiment was recruited principally in New York City, turned over to the State in September, 1861, and received its numerical volunteer designation December 7, 1861.

The regiment left the State May 18, 1861; served at and near Washington, D. C., from May 20, 1861; in 2d Brigade, 1st Division, Army of Northeastern Virginia, from July, 1861; in Stone's Brigade, Division Potomac, from August 1, 1861; in Gorman's Brigade, Stone's Division, Army of Potomac, from October 15, 1861; in same, 1st, brigade, 2d Division, 2d Corps, Army of Potomac, from March, 1862.

The regiment was quartered near the United States Capitol until July 3, 1861, when it crossed into Virginia and engaged at Bull Run, with a loss of 60 in killed, wounded and missing. After passing the winter in the defenses of Washington, it moved to the Peninsula with the general advance under McClellan in March, 1862. It participated in the siege of Yorktown; the battle of Fair Oaks; the Seven Days fighting; was next active in the Maryland campaign and suffered severe losses at Antietam in the advance of Sedgwick's division, upon the Dunker Church. Out of 339 men engaged, 128 were reported killed, wounded or missing. The regiment arrived at Falmouth, Virginia, late in November; participated in the battle of Fredericksburg; returned to its camp at Falmouth; was active at Chancellorsville in May, 1863; after a short rest at Falmouth marched to Gettysburg and there suffered fearful loss, 192 members out of 365 engaged, Col. Huston being numbered among the dead. It next participated in the engagements of the 2nd Corps at Auburn and Bristoe Station in the autumn and in the Mine Run campaign, and went into winter quarters at Brandy Station, Virginia (during this time, a soldier or soldiers of the regiment completed a drawing entitled "How are you Fort Sumter" at the Graffiti House). Camp was broken for the Wilderness campaign late in April, 1864, and the regiment was in action constantly until after the first assault on Petersburg, where it lost 1 man killed, 9 wounded and 111 missing. The men not entitled to be mustered out with the regiment were, May 22, 1864, formed into a battalion of five companies, those of A and C forming Company A; those of B and G forming Company B; those of F and I forming Company C; those of D and H forming Company D, and those of E and K forming Company E, and on June 28, 1864, the men of the 42d Infantry, not mustered out with their regiment, were transferred to this battalion, which was finally, July 10, 1864, transferred to the 59th Infantry. On June 25, 1864, the term of service expired and the original members not reenlisted were mustered out, the remainder of the regiment being consolidated into a battalion of five companies. The regiment was conspicuous for its dash and daring and became famous for its fighting qualities.

== Total strength and casualties ==
The total enrollment of the regiment was 1,452 members; during its service the regiment lost by death, killed in action, 5 officers, 129 enlisted men; of wounds received in action, 5 officers, 38 enlisted men; of disease and other causes, 5 officers, 84 enlisted men; total, 15 officers, 251 enlisted men; aggregate, 266; of whom 24 enlisted men died in the hands of the enemy.CITEREFNYSMM,_82nd_Regiment_Infantry2001

== Commanders ==
- Colonel George W.B. Tompkins
- Colonel Henry W. Hudson
- Colonel James Huston

== See also ==
- List of New York Civil War regiments
