= 81st Pennsylvania Infantry Regiment =

Union Army infantry regiment

81st Pennsylvania Volunteer Infantry
- Active: August 6, 1861, to June 29, 1865
- Country: United States
- Allegiance: Union
- Branch: Infantry
- Engagements: Peninsula Campaign; Siege of Yorktown; Battle of Seven Pines; Seven Days Battles; Battle of Antietam; Battle of Fredericksburg; Battle of Chancellorsville; Battle of Brandy Station; Battle of Gettysburg; Bristoe Campaign; Battle of Mine Run; Battle of the Wilderness; Battle of Spotsylvania Court House; Battle of Totopotomoy Creek; Battle of Cold Harbor; Siege of Petersburg; Second Battle of Petersburg; First Battle of Deep Bottom; Second Battle of Deep Bottom; Second Battle of Ream's Station; Battle of Fort Stedman; Appomattox Campaign; Battle of Appomattox

The 81st Pennsylvania Volunteer Infantry was an infantry regiment that served in the Second Corps, First Division, of the Army of the Potomac during the American Civil War.

== Service ==
The 81st Pennsylvania Volunteer Infantry (81st PVI) was recruited beginning in August 1861, under the direction of James Miller, from Philadelphia, Carbon, and Luzerne Counties in Pennsylvania. The men reported in squads and companies to Easton, Pennsylvania where the regiment was organized into 10 companies at Camp Washington with James Miller appointed Colonel, Charles F Johnson, Lieutenant Colonel, and Eric Conner, major.

The regiment was transferred to Washington, DC, on October 10, 1861, going into camp at Kendall Green then two weeks later moving to a camp overlooking the Potomac River and the Washington Navy Yard.

After moving to their second camp in Washington, the regiment was attached to General Casey's Brigade, soon assigned to General Oliver O. Howard, in Richardson's Division. When President Lincoln created corps in the Army of the Potomac in March 1862, the 81st PVI was assigned to the Second Corps under General E. V. Sumner, the First Division commanded by General Richardson, and the First Brigade, commanded by General Howard. The regiment remained in the First Brigade, First Division of the Second Corps throughout its service in the Civil War.

The 81st Pennsylvania Volunteer Infantry regiment mustered out of service on June 29, 1865, at Alexandria, Virginia, although many of the men had already mustered out of service earlier in June.

== Detailed service ==
At Easton, Pennsylvania, until October 10. Moved to Washington, DC, October 10. Duty in the defenses of Washington, DC, until March 1862. Advance on Manassas, Virginia., March 10–15. Reconnaissance to Gainesville March 20. Operations on Orange and Alexandria Railroad March 28–31. Ordered to the Virginia Peninsula. Siege of Yorktown April 5-May 4. Construction of Grape Vine Bridge on Chickahominy May 28–30. Battle of Seven Pines May 31-June 1. Fair Oaks June 18. Fair Oaks Station June 21. Seven days before Richmond June 25-July 1. Orchard Station June 28. Peach Orchard, Allen's Farm, June 29. Savage Station June 29. White Oak Swamp Bridge, and Glendale June 30. Malvern Hill July 1. At Harrison's Landing until August 16. Movement to Fortress Monroe, then to Alexandria and Centreville August 16–30. Centreville September 1. Maryland Campaign September 6–24. Battle of Antietam, September 16–17. Moved to Harper's Ferry and duty there until October 29. Reconnaissance to Charlestown October 16–17. Advance up Loudon Valley and movement to Falmouth, Virginia, October 29-November 17. Snicker's Gap November 2. Manassas Gap November 5–6. Battle of Fredericksburg, December 12–15. At Falmouth until April 1863. Chancellorsville Campaign April 27-May 6. Battle of Chancellorsville May 1–5. Reconnaissance to the Rappahannock June 9. Kelly's Ford June 10. Gettysburg Campaign June 13-July 24. Battle of Gettysburg July 1–3. Pursuit of Lee July 5–24. Duty on line of the Rappahannock until September. Advance from the Rappahannock to the Rapidan September 13–17. Bristoe Campaign October 9–22. Auburn and Bristoe October 14. Advance to line of the Rappahannock November 7–8. Mine Run Campaign November 26-December 2. Mine Run November 28–30. At Stevensburg until May, 1864. Demonstration on the Rapidan February 6–7. Rapidan Campaign May 4-June 12. Battles of the Wilderness May 5–7; Corbin's Bridge May 8; Spotsylvania May 8–12; Po River May 10; Spotsylvania Court House May 12–21. Assault on the Salient May 12. Landen House May 18. North Anna River May 23–26. Line of the Pamunkey May 26–28. Totopotomoy May 28–31. Cold Harbor June 12. Before Petersburg June 16–18. Siege of Petersburg June 16, 1864, to April 2, 1865. Jerusalem Plank Road June 22–23, 1864. Demonstration north of the James at Deep Bottom July 27–29. Deep Bottom July 27–28. Mine Explosion, Petersburg, July 30 (reserve). Demonstration north of the James at Deep Bottom August 13–20. Strawberry Plains, Deep Bottom, August 14–18. Ream's Station August 25. Reconnaissance to Hatcher's Run December 7–10. Hatcher's Run December 8. Dabney's, Mills, Hatcher's Run, February 5–7, 1865. Watkins' House, Petersburg, March 25. Appomattox Campaign March 28-April 9. On line of Hatcher's and Gravelly Runs March 29–30. Hatcher's Run or Boydton Road March 31. White Oak Road March 31. Sutherland Station April 2. Sailor's Creek April 6. High Bridge, Farmville, April 7. Appomattox Courthouse April 9. Surrender of Lee and his army. March to Washington, DC, May 2–12. Grand Review of the Armies May 23.

== Casualties ==
The number of casualties taken by the men in the regiment during their service varies depending on the source of the information. Samuel Bates in 1870, estimated a total of 1,016 casualties in the regiment over the time of service as shown in the table below.

Accounting of casualties of the 81st Pennsylvania Volunteer Infantry Regiment, 1861-1865
	Field and staff	Line officers	Enlisted men	Total
Killed	4	14	201	219
Wounded	5	40	516	561
Prisoners	1	2	152	155
Died of disease	2	0	79	81
Total	12	56	948	1,016

William F. Fox estimated 306 total deaths of men in the regiment: 208 killed or died from wounds and 98 by disease, accidents, or in prison. The monument to the 81st PVI at Gettysburg shows a total loss of 1,050 men throughout the war with 204 deaths, 560 men wounded, and 133 captured or missing.

== Commanders ==
- Colonel James Miller - killed in action at the Battle of Seven Pines
- Colonel Henry Boyd McKeen - mortally wounded at the Battle of Cold Harbor while in command of a brigade
- Lieutenant Colonel Amos Stroh - commanded at the Battle of Gettysburg
- Lieutenant Colonel William Wilson - commanded at the First Battle of Deep Bottom and during the Appomattox Campaign

== Notable members ==
- Private Ching Lee (a.k.a. Thomas Sylvanus), Company D - one of the few Chinese Americans who served in the Union or Confederate Army or Navy during the war

== See also ==
- List of Pennsylvania Civil War Units
- Pennsylvania in the Civil War
