= Battle of Sutherland's Station =

Battle of the American Civil War

Coordinates: 37°11′51″N 77°33′45″W

- Part of the American Civil War
| Date | April 2, 1865 |
| Location | Dinwiddie County, Virginia |
| Result | Union victory |

Belligerents
| United States (Union) | (Confederate States of America) Confederate States (Confederacy) |

Commanders and leaders
| Nelson A. Miles | Henry Heth; Cadmus M. Wilcox |

Strength
| 1,500 | 3,000 |

Casualties and losses
| 370 | 600 |

The Battle of Sutherland's Station was an American Civil War conflict fought on April 2, 1865, in Dinwiddie, Virginia during the Appomattox Campaign.

Union columns converged on Petersburg on April 2, pushing through a large section of the Confederate defensive entrenchments. As Robert E. Lee desperately sought to buy time to allow his army to withdraw, Ulysses S. Grant launched several other attacks. Stubborn Confederate resistance at Fort Gregg delayed Grant's progress. Meanwhile, Maj. Gen. Nelson A. Miles's Union division battered Henry Heth's Confederates near Sutherland's Station and drove them off the field. The Confederate defenders were scattered and driven northwestward. With this victory, the Federals possessed the South Side Railroad, Gen. Robert E. Lee's last supply line into Petersburg. However, the lengthy defense of Fort Gregg and Grant's hesitation in aggressively following up on his success at Sutherland's Station permitted Lee to evacuate his army that night.

== Battle ==
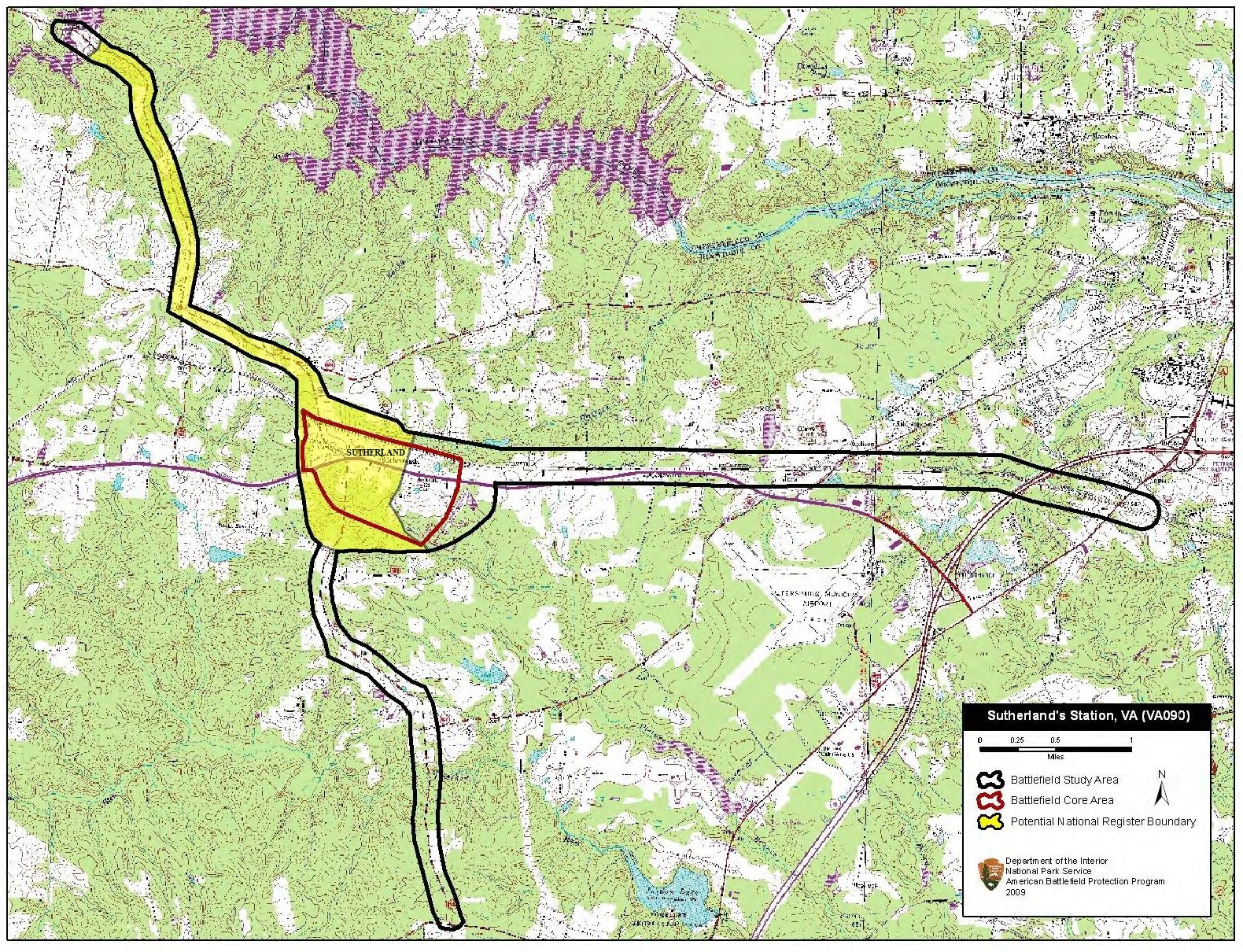
Map of Sutherland's Station Battlefield core and study areas by the American Battlefield Protection Program.

Gen. Ulysses S. Grant had besieged Petersburg for ten long months, but as April 1865 opened, the Army of the Potomac under its commander, George G. Meade, was finally in a position to break through the entrenchments of the Army of Northern Virginia. At 4:30 on the morning of April 2 on the Confederate earthworks west of Petersburg. Meade sent forward four Union corps, with the VI Corps succeeding in breaking through the thinly manned Confederate lines. Flushed with success, the Union troops poured through the breach and turned the Southern flanks, eventually gaining control of the entrenchments from Hatcher's Run to Boydton Plank Road.

Robert E. Lee, realizing that the loss of so much of his defensive perimeter had now doomed the city, issued orders to evacuate Petersburg. He sent word to his remaining commanders to hold as long as they could to allow an orderly retreat. Federal troops repeatedly attacked Fort Gregg (held by only 500 Confederate defenders), but failed to quickly seize the vital fort, allowing Lee time to establish an inner defensive line to protect his army's rear as it retired.

Grant turned his attention to the west, where the South Side Railroad had provided a vital last supply line for Lee's beleaguered troops. Maj. Gen. Andrew A. Humphreys's II Corps faced the forces of Maj. Gen. Henry Heth running from Hatcher's Run to White Oak Road. Heth's men constituted the extreme right flank of Lee's army. Nelson Miles's division had been sent to reinforce Philip Sheridan on the Union flank. Not needing the infantry support, Sheridan sent Miles back. Once the VI Corps had broken through, Humphreys was ordered to attack along his front. When the order came for Humphreys to attack, Heth had already begun to fall back to a secondary line. Humphreys only had one division available to attack. Not far from the battlefield of Battle of Five Forks, his only available division easily pushed forward through light resistance and seized a salient in the Confederate line. When Miles' division of three brigades returned, it faced abandoned trenches. Humphreys wanted to immediately move against Heth, but Meade had ordered all the Union infantry to turn and face Petersburg. Humphreys responded by turning to the north, but left Miles behind to deal with Heth.

Miles pursued the retiring Confederates up the Claiborne Road as far as Sutherland's Station (nineteen miles from Petersburg). There, Heth had regrouped four Confederate brigades in an attempt to defend the South Side Railroad, their left flank anchored at Ocran Methodist Church. By now, Heth had learned that Lt. Gen. A. P. Hill had been killed earlier in the day, and now he was in command of the Third Army Corps as its senior division commander. Dodging Federal patrols, he hastened to Petersburg, where he found that Lee had instead decided to disband the corps and give its units to James Longstreet.

At 3:00 p.m., Miles struck north from White Oak Road and launched his initial attack under orders from Grant to follow up on Humphreys's initial breakthrough. Heth's division repulsed two Federal attacks before Miles sent for reinforcements. As had been the case for the II Corps all morning, Humphreys backtracked to Sutherland Station to reinforce Miles. However, Miles launched a third assault and Heth's weary Confederates finally buckled, then broke. John R. Cooke's brigade stubbornly held up the Federals as the remainder of Heth's troops headed west. Miles's victorious men pushed ahead and captured nearly 1,000 prisoners and 2 artillery pieces. In the meantime, Grant had delayed the final attack on Fort Gregg while he awaited news regarding Miles' outcome, another delay that helped Lee evacuate more troops from Petersburg. By the time that the fort finally fell, Lee had bought enough time to successfully extricate the vast majority of his army.

In the savage fighting around Sutherland's Station, Miles reported 370 casualties, while the Confederates lost approximately 600 men killed or wounded, plus 1,000 taken as prisoners of war. Humphreys's II Corps had been made to wander back and forth all morning and the general later contended that, had his whole corps been allowed to move against the Confederates, Heth's whole command would have been destroyed.

== Sources ==
- Marvel, William, Lee's Last Retreat: The Flight to Appomattox, The University of North Carolina Press, 2002. ISBN 0-8078-2745-2.
- National Park Service description
- CWSAC Report Update
