= 2nd New York Infantry Regiment =

- Active: May 14, 1861, to May 26, 1863
- Country: United States
- Allegiance: Union
- Branch: Infantry
- Size: 791 (1861) (Note: As reported back to Adjutant General Hillhouse upon departure from New York on May 26, 1861); 749 (1862) (Note: As reported back to Adjutant General Hillhouse, on December 31, 1862); 439 (1863) (Note: As reported back to Adjutant General Sprague, on December 31, 1863)
- Nickname: Troy Regiment
- Equipment: Model 1842 Springfield Muskets (.69 caliber, smooth), (Note: On 18 Sep 1861, 720 Harper's Ferry smooth bore Model 1842s, altered from flint to percussion locks and rifled. As reported back to Adjutant General on December 31, 1863. This was the number turned in when issued rifled Model 1842 Springfields over the winter of 1862-1863.) Model 1842 Springfield Muskets (.69 caliber, rifled)
- Engagements: Battle of Big Bethel; Battle of Fair Oaks; Seven Days Battles; Battle of Oak Grove; Battle of Glendale; Battle of Malvern Hill; Battle of Bristoe Station; Battle of Groveton; Second Battle of Bull Run; Battle of Chantilly; Battle of Fredericksburg; Battle of Chancellorsville

Commanders
- Colonel: George L. Willard
- Colonel: Joseph Bradford Carr
- Colonel: Sidney Wesley Park

Insignia
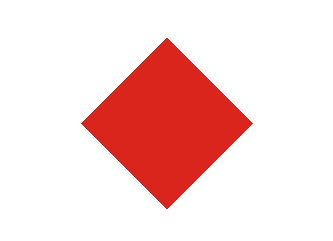
- III Corps (1st Division) badge

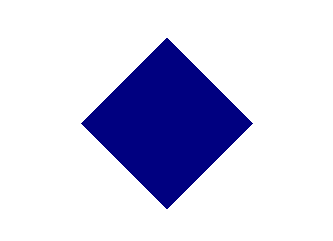
- III Corps (3rd Division) badge

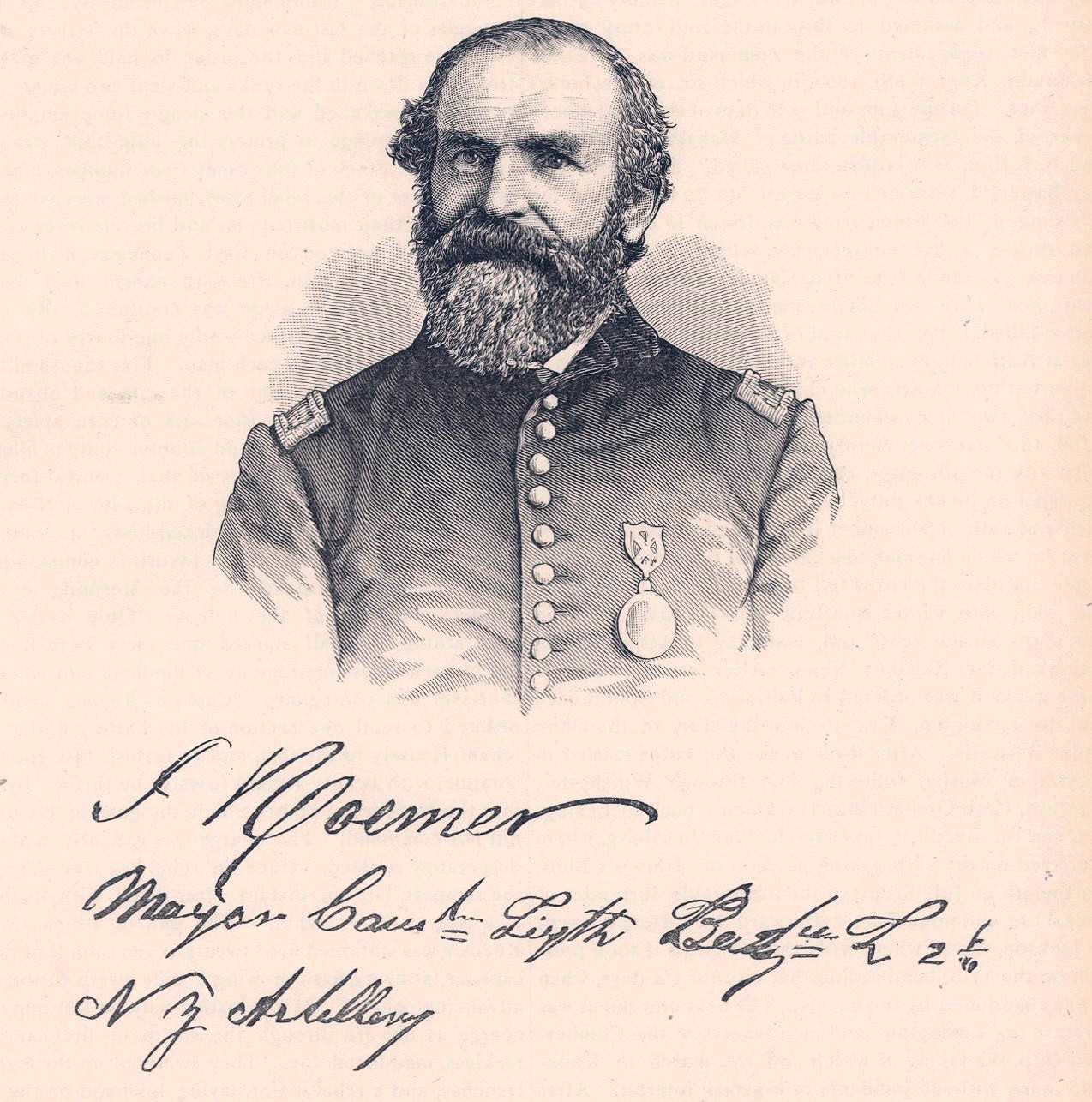
Major Jacob Roemer in the Second Battle of Bull Run

The 2nd New York Infantry Regiment was an infantry regiment that served in the Union Army during the American Civil War. It is also known as the Troy Regiment.

== Organization ==
The 2nd New York Volunteer Infantry Regiment was recruited and organized in Troy, New York to serve two years beginning on April 15, 1861. The regiment was originally raised to be commanded by New York native, George L. Willard (Note: Willard, who had gained his commission by gallantry as a sergeant at Chapultepec Castle and for distinguished service throughout the Mexican War, and on the personal recommendation of Major General Winfield Scott, was commissioned a 2nd Lieutenant in the 8th United States Regular Infantry in 1848. Remaining on active duty, he did well, gaining the rank of 1st Lieutenant by the outbreak of the Civil War. Having earned his commission the hard way, he was loath to give it up for a volunteer commission. In late 1862 Willard, by then a major in the 19th U. S. Infantry, organized and became colonel of the 125th New York Volunteer Infantry Regiment. He was allowed to retain his regular commission. He suffered misfortune while commanding his regiment at Harpers Ferry, West Virginia, in 1862. His raw recruits did not distinguish themselves in the Battle of Harpers Ferry, in which they fell apart under fire during the fighting on Bolivar Heights. They were too frightened, especially by the enfilade fire coming in from Loudon Heights to rally. When the garrison was surrendered to Stonewall Jackson by Col. Dixon S. Miles, Willard and his men became prisoners of war. By Gettysburg, Willard commanded the "Harper's Ferry Brigade" (consisting of the 39th, 111th, 125th, and 126th New York regiments) as the 3rd brigade, 3rd Division of II Corps The "Harpers Ferry Cowards" redeemed themselves when they stopped the advance of Brig. Gen. William Barksdale, on July 2, 1863 at the Peach Orchard and then pressed forward toward Cemetery Ridge. Willard ordered the two regiments on his right forward, pushing the Confederates back. Some of Willard's men are reported to have yelled, as they charged, "Remember Harpers Ferry!". After recovering abandoned Union guns, Willard had just ordered his men back to their start line just north of Weikert's Woods when he was killed by an artillery round.) serving in the 9th U.S. Infantry who was offered the regiment on April 24. Willard did not want to give up his regular commission for the command, so on May 10, the state turned the regiment over to Joseph B Carr, an Albany native who had risen in the New York militia to the renk of Colonel. The 2nd was accepted by the state April 24, 1861, and mustered in the service of the United States at Troy for two years on May 14, 1861.The companies were recruited primarily:

- A, B, G, and K - Troy
- C - Troy, Ballston, Saratoga, Brunswick, Schenectady, Lansingburgh, Grafton, Cohoes, Union Village, and Poestenkill
- D - Troy and Cohoes
- E - Troy, Caldwell, Cohoes, and Lansingburgh
- F - Troy and Pittstown
- H - Troy, Green Island, Cohoes, Lansingburgh, and Pittstown
- I - North Adams (MA), Cohoes, Troy, Petersburgh, Berlin, Pittstown, Pownall (VT), and Schaghticoke.

It mustered in with 800 recruits.

== Service ==
Under the command of Col Carr, the 2nd New York left Troy on the Thursday, May 18, for New York. In Manhattan, it embarked for Fortress Monroe. It It served there until June 10, when it received orders to move to the support of the force encamped at Mill Creek. It participated in the battle of Big Bethel.

On Monday, August 5, the regiment was ordered to Newport News, where permanent quarters were erected and remained there until June 3, 1862, receiving in October and November, 1861, a number of men of the 13th, 19th and 21st Infantry, and 2nd Maine Volunteers (130 men), transferred into the regiment; those of the Maine regiment were, however, retransferred in August, 1862.

During the following winter at Newport News, it received new recruits from Troy. In Jan., 1862, it joined an expedition up the James Rive. The 2nd became a part of the 1st Brigade, 1st Division of the Army of Virginia on March 7. On March 8, the regiment witnessed the battle between the Monitor and the Merrimac.

From April 6 to 17 it was stationed at Young's Mill, and on June 6 was assigned to the 3d Brigade, 2nd Division, III Corps of McClellan's Army of the Potomac which had just landed on the Peninsula. The regiment took part in the campaign on the Peninsula. It joined the brigade too late to fight in for the battle of Williamsburg. The 2nd New York was engaged at the Battle of Fair Oaks, and subsequently in the Seven Days' battles. In August, it was at Malvern Hill. After the battle, it was sent to Harrison's Landing and remained there until the evacuation from the Peninsula.

It returned to Alexandria and was ordered to Manassas, where it participated in the campaign in Virginia. It was fought at Bristoe Station, where the loss was 70 in killed, wounded and missing. It continued fighting at Groveton and in the Second Battle of Bull Run on August 30. It fought at Chantilly and then remained in the defenses of Washington near Fort Lyon, Fairfax Seminary and at Munson's Hill until November.

After various marches and counter marches in Virginia, the regiment took part in operations on Orange & Alexandria Railroad from November 10–12. On December 14–15, it participated in the Battle of Fredericksburg, after which it went into winter quarters near Falmouth, which were occupied until the opening of the Chancellorsville movement in the spring of 1863.

It took part in the Mud March in January 1863. On May 2 and 3, 1863, the 1st was engaged at Chancellorsville. During this battle the loss of the regiment was 54.

On May 11, 1863, 120 men enlisted for three years' service and were transferred to the 70th New York. The remainder of the men soon left the Army of the Potomac and headed home. On May 26, 1863, commanded by Col. Sidney Wesley Park, the men of the regiment were honorably discharged and mustered out in New York city.

== Affiliations, battle honors, detailed service, and casualties ==
=== Organizational affiliation ===
Attached to:

- Attached to Fort Monroe, Camp Hamilton and Newport News, Va., Dept. of Virginia, May 1861, to May, 1862.
- 1st Brigade, 1st Division, Dept. of Virginia, to June 1862.
- 3rd Brigade, 3rd Division, III Corps, Army of the Potomac, to August 1862.
- 2nd Brigade, 1st Division, III Corps, to September 1862.
- 3rd Brigade, 1st Division, III Corps, to May 1863.

=== List of battles ===
The official list of battles in which the regiment bore a part:

- Battle of Big Bethel
- Battle of Fair Oaks
- Seven Days Battles
- Battle of Oak Grove
- Battle of Glendale
- Battle of Malvern Hill
- Battle of Bristoe Station
- Battle of Groveton (Note: The NPS has established these dates for the battle. The references by Greene, Hennessy, Salmon, and Kennedy, whose works are closely aligned with the NPS, adopt these dates as well. However, all of the other references to this article specify that the action on August 28 was a prelude to, but separate from, the Second Battle of Bull Run. Some of these authors name the action on August 28 the Battle of Groveton or Brawner's Farm.)
- Second Battle of Bull Run
- Battle of Chantilly
- Battle of Fredericksburg
- Battle of Chancellorsville

=== Detailed service ===
==== 1861 ====
- Departed New York May 18
- Occupation of Newport News May 29
- Action at Big Bethel, Va., June 10
- Duty at Camp Hamilton and Newport News, Va., till June, 1862

==== 1862 ====
- Expedition up James River January 17, 1862.
- Action between Monitor and Merrimac in Hampton Roads March 8, 1862
- Joined Army of the Potomac on the Peninsula June 5
- Near Fair Oaks June 16, 18 and 21.
- Battle of Oak Grove June 25.
- Seven days before Richmond June 25-July 1
- About Fair Oaks June 26–29
- Peach Orchard and Savage Station June 29
- White Oak Swamp and Glendale June 30
- Malvern Hill July 1
- Duty at Harrison's Landing till August 16
- Malvern Hill August 5.
- Movement to Fortress Monroe, thence to Centreville August 16–26
- Pope's Campaign in Northern Virginia August 28-September 2
- Bristoe Station or Kettle Run August 27.
- Battle of Groveton August 29
- Bull Run August 30
- Duty in the Defenses of Washington, D. C, near Fort Lyon, Fairfax Seminary and at Munson's Hill till November, and at Fairfax Station, Va., November 2–25.
- Operations on Orange & Alexandria Railroad November 10–12.
- Near Falmouth, Va November 2S-December 11.
- Battle of Fredericksburg December 12–15.

==== 1863 ====
- "Mud March" January 20–24, 1863.
- Operations at Rappahannock Bridge and Grove Church February 5–7.
- At Falmouth till April 27
- Chancellorsville Campaign April 27-May 6
- Battle of Chancellorsville May 1–5
- Mustered out May 26, 1863, expiration of term.

== Total strength and casualties ==
The regiment suffered 1 Officer and 25 Enlisted men killed and mortally wounded and 22 Enlisted men by disease. Total 48.

== Commanders ==
- Colonel George L. Willard
- Colonel Joseph Bradford Carr
- Colonel Sidney Wesley Park

== Armament ==
The 2nd New York were issued the Model 1842 Springfield Muskets .69 caliber, smoothbore when accepted by the state on Wednesday, April 24, 1861. At some time prior to the Fredericksburg campaign, all companies except Company A, exchanged their 1842 Springfield smoothbores for 1842s that had been rifled (still .69 caliber). (Note: Like the earlier Model 1840, the Model 1842 was produced with an intentionally thicker barrel than necessary, with the assumption that it would likely be rifled later. As the designers anticipated, many of the Model 1842 muskets had their barrels rifled later so that they could fire the newly developed Minié ball. The smoothbore version was produced without sights (except for a cast one on the barrel band). When Model 1842 muskets were modified to have rifled barrels, sights were usually added at the same time as the rifling. The original smoothbore version of the 1842 musket was effectively used during the American Civil War.) They carried these through to their mustering out.

=== Shoulder Arms ===
Issued weapons

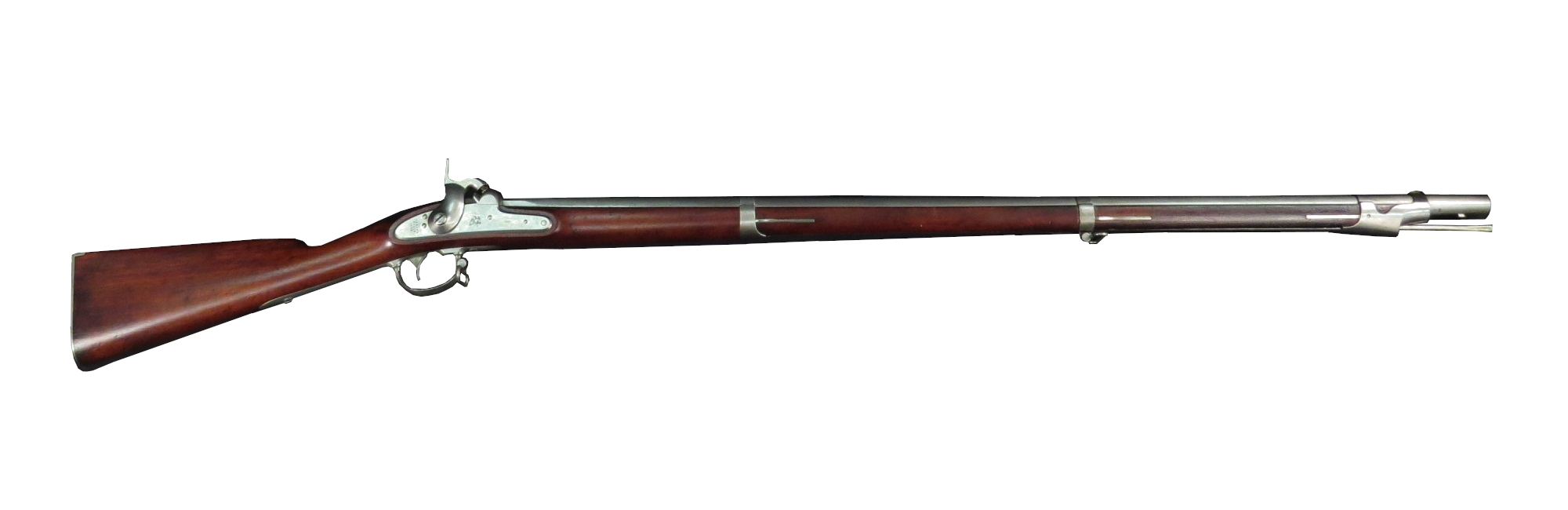
Springfield Model 1842 smoothbore musket

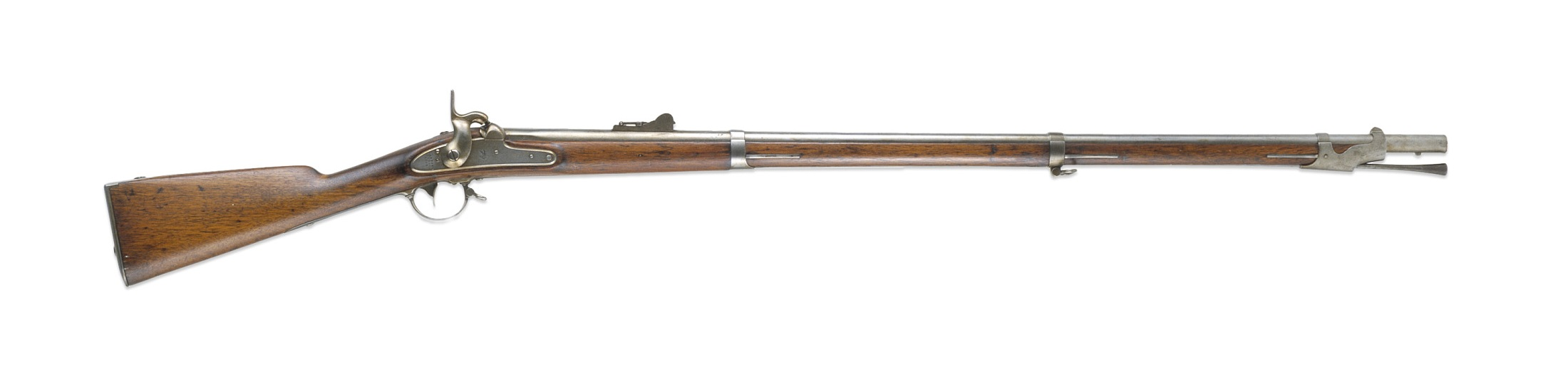
Springfield Model 1842 rifled musket

== Uniform ==
The men of the regiment were issued regulation dark blue frock coats with dark blue state issued trousers. As their service continued, they were issued the dark blue New York State chasseur jackets as well as the standard dark blue sack coat. The standard regulation sky blue trousers gradually replaced the state-issued dark blue trousers.

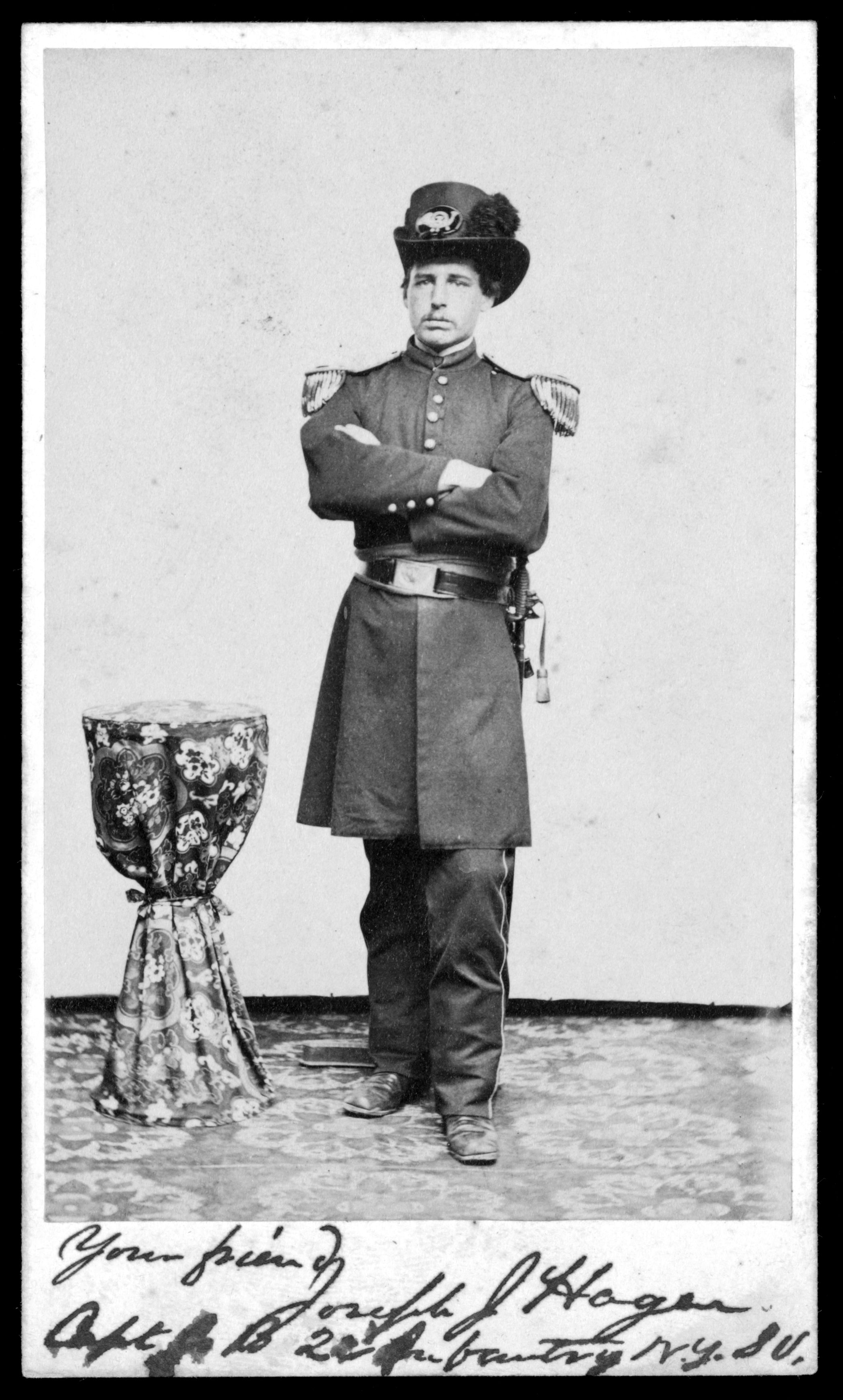
Captain Joseph J. Hagen of Co. E and Co. B, 2nd New York Infantry Regiment in uniform; Union Photographic Gallery, "Camp Butler," Newport News, Va.; H.P. Ross, South Groton, Mass.; J. Sidney Miller, Nashua, N.H. - Library of Congress

== See also ==
- List of New York Civil War regiments
