= Allyn Capron =

United States Army officer (1846–1898)

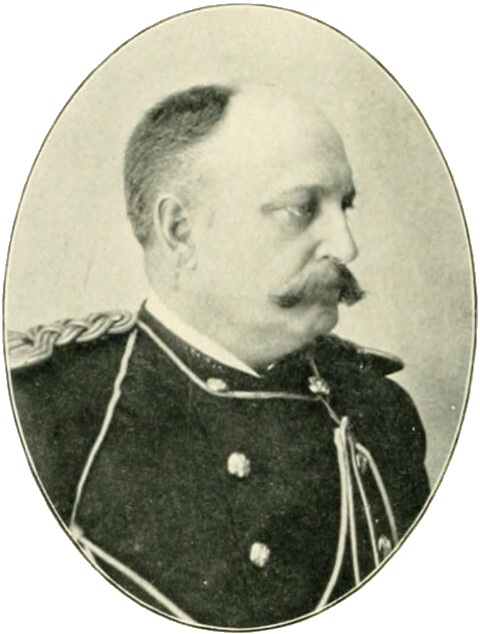
- Allyn Capron
- Born: August 27, 1846; Fort Brooke, Florida, US
- Died: September 18, 1898 (aged 52); Fort Myer, Virginia, US
- Burial place: Arlington National Cemetery
- Relatives: Allyn Kissam Capron (son); Erastus A. Capron (father)
- Military career
- Branch: United States Army
- Service years: 1867–98
- Rank: Captain
- Unit: 1st U.S. Artillery
- Conflicts: Sioux Wars; Pullman Strike; Spanish–American War: Battle of Santiago de Cuba
- Awards: Silver Star (2)

Allyn Capron (August 27, 1846 – September 18, 1898), was a captain in the United States Army. He commanded an artillery battery during the Wounded Knee Massacre.

== Life before the Spanish–American War ==
Capron was born on August 27, 1846, at Fort Brooke, Florida to Harriet Read Fanning Barnard and Erastus Allyn Capron, an 1833 graduate of the United States Military Academy at West Point. 1847 brought the death of Erastus in the Mexican–American War. Upon reaching age, Allyn was nominated by a U.S. Congressman from North Carolina to enroll, like his father before him, into the U.S. Military Academy. He was sworn in as a cadet on September 1, 1863, and graduated June 17, 1867.

Upon graduating from the Academy, Capron was commissioned a 2nd lieutenant of the 1st Artillery Regiment. He held a variety of assignments on the east coast until he was promoted to 1st lieutenant on August 19, 1873.

He was promoted to captain on December 4, 1888, and was assigned as commander of Battery E, 1st Artillery Regiment. He served at the Presidio of San Francisco until May 1890 when Battery E was reassigned to Fort Douglas near Salt Lake City, Utah. He served in the Sioux Wars from November 1890 to January 1891, for which he received official commendation in 1891 and in times of peace in California, Utah, Illinois, Virginia, and Florida, until the U.S. went to war with Spain in 1898.

Capron commanded Battery E at the Wounded Knee Massacre in South Dakota on December 29, 1890. The battery's four Hotchkiss breech-loading rifles (Model 1875) are frequently cited as major factor in the high casualties among the Lakotas. (Native-American casualties in the battle are generally estimated to have been about 90 men and 210 women and children killed and 50 others wounded out of an estimated 350 present at the battle.)

Capron was on sick leave from May to July 1891 and rejoined his battery at Fort Riley, Kansas where he served until the battery was reassigned to Fort Sheridan, Illinois in September where it assisted in quelling the railroad strike riots. Capron remained at Fort Sheridan until October 1896. In 1892 the battery participated in the dedicatory ceremonies of the Chicago World's Fair. In October 1896 the battery was reassigned to Washington Barracks (later renamed Fort McNair in Washington, D.C.

In April 1898, following the outbreak of the Spanish–American War, the battery was sent to Tampa, Florida, where it prepared for the upcoming invasion of Cuba. Capron and Battery E accompanied Major General William R. Shafter's V Corps when it landed in Cuba in June. Capron's battery supported the Major General Lawton's division's attack on the Spanish at El Caney the morning of 1 July 1898 which was launched as a supporting attack to pin Spanish forces at El Caney and to keep them from coming to the aid of the Spanish under fire of the main attack on San Juan Heights. Capron's son, Captain Allyn Kissam Capron, was a troop commander of the Rough Riders. During an early battle, the younger Capron was killed.

Capron's battery arrived at the front soon and the captain commanded his artillerymen throughout the Siege of Santiago. However, Capron contracted typhoid fever during the campaign and obtained leave of absence which started on August 26, 1898. He died of his ailment near his home at Fort Myer, Virginia on September 18, 1898. He is buried in Arlington National Cemetery.

== Memberships and awards ==
Capron was a hereditary member of the Aztec Club of 1847 by right of his father's service in the Mexican War.

Capron received two Silver Citation Stars of gallantry in action (one for the Sioux Campaign of 1890 to 1891 and the other for service in Cuba). In 1932, Silver Citation Stars was converted to the Silver Star decoration. He was posthumously eligible for the Civil War Campaign Medal, Indian Campaign Medal and Spanish Campaign Medal.
