= Simons' Inn =

- U.S. National Register of Historic Places
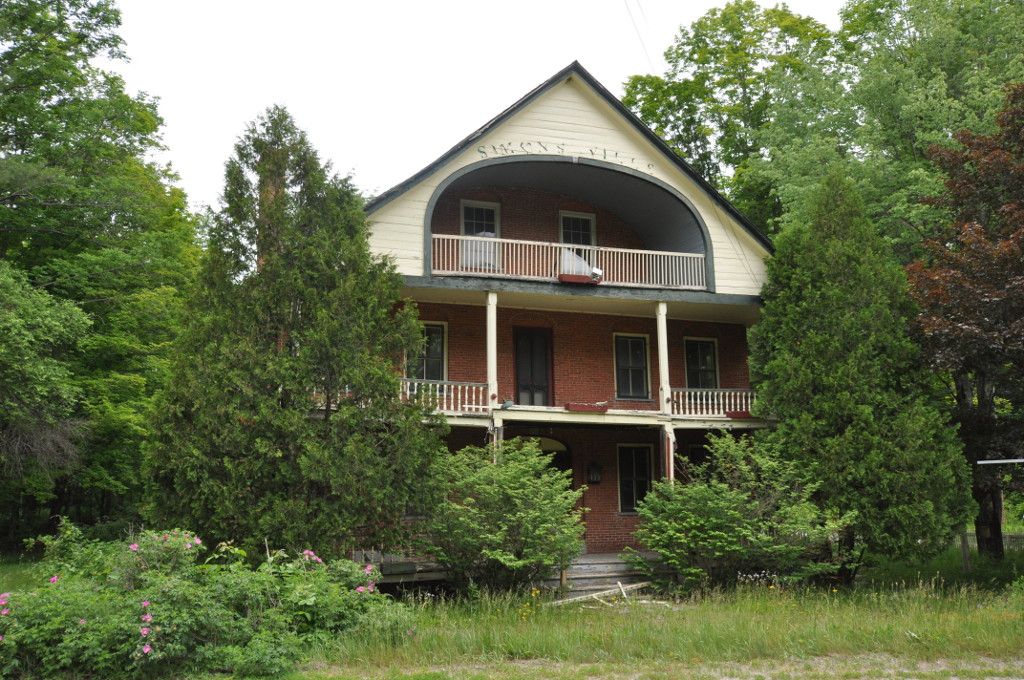

- Location within Vermont Location within the United States
- Location: VT 11 at Middletown Rd., Andover, Vermont
- Coordinates: 43°15′28″N 72°43′1″W
- Area: less than one acre
- Built: 1826
- Built by: Simons, Major Edward L.
- Architectural style: Greek Revival, Federal
- NRHP reference No.: 79000233
- Added to NRHP: March 2, 1979

Simons' Inn, also known more as Rowell's Inn, is a historic traveler's accommodation on Vermont Route 11 in Andover, Vermont. Built in 1826, it is a remarkably well-preserved example of a 19th-century stagecoach inn. It has for many years been a local community meeting point, serving as a general store and post office until 1950. It was listed on the National Register of Historic Places in 1979. Under new ownership, Brigitte Hagerman Fijal and Jason Fijal, since 2024 the Inn has been renamed The Inn Between and Which Way Tavern. Welcoming locals and travels.

== Description and history ==
Rowell's Inn stands in the crossroads village of Simonsville in central southern Andover, a rural community on the east side of Vermont's Green Mountains. It is located at the western corner of Route 11 and the Middletown Road. Route 11 is a historically (and presently) major east–west route across the state, and Middletown Road leads to the town center of Weston, which was originally part of Andover. The inn is a large 2 1/2-story brick building, with a front-facing gabled roof. Its most prominent feature is a three-level porch, the first two levels spanning the full width of the front facade, and the third set in a curved-ceiling recess under the gable. The building's walls are locally made brick laid in American bond, and the sills and lintels are soapstone. The main entrance is at the center of the front facade; it is a double door of late Victorian vintage, which replaced an original Federal period entrance with sidelight windows. A wood-frame ell 1 1/2 stories in height extends to the building's rear, and a 20th-century garage stands on the property as well.

The inn was built in 1826 (not 1820 as stated incorrectly on a plate above the door) by Edward Simons, and has served as a local community meeting point and traveler's accommodation since then. It is architecturally a distinctive example of Federal period architecture, with the front porch (added later) giving it Greek Revival flair. In 1910, the inn was purchased by Frederick Rowell, and has generally been known as Rowell's Inn since then.

== See also ==
- National Register of Historic Places listings in Windsor County, Vermont
