= Allyn K. Capron =

United States Army officer (1871–1898)

Allyn Kissam Capron
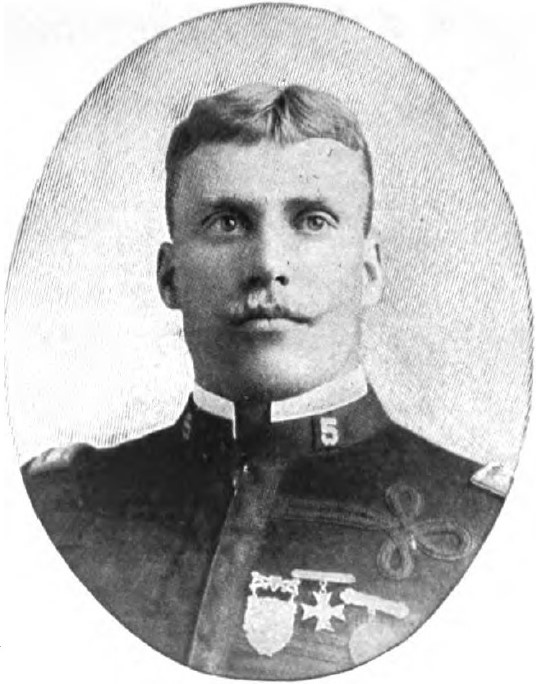
- Plate of Allyn K. Capron from The Rough Riders, 1899
- Born: 24 June 1871; Brooklyn, New York City, New York
- Died: 24 June 1898 (aged 27); Las Guásimas, Santiago de Cuba Province, Cuba
- Burial place: Arlington National Cemetery
- Relatives: Allyn Capron (father)
- Military career
- Branch: United States Army
- Service years: 1890–98
- Rank: Captain
- Unit: 1st U.S. Volunteer Cavalry
- Conflicts: Spanish–American War: Battle of Las Guasimas
- Awards: Silver Star

Captain Allyn K. Capron (24 June 1871 – 24 June 1898) was the first United States Army officer to die in the Spanish–American War.

== Before Cuba ==
Allyn Kissam Capron was the first son of Agnes Kissam and Allyn Capron, an 1867 graduate of the United States Military Academy. The younger Capron was born on 24 June 1871 in Brooklyn, New York City, where his father was serving as an Army officer at Fort Hamilton. He was unsuccessful in obtaining an appointment to the Military Academy for himself, so he enlisted as private in 1890 and rose rapidly through the ranks as:

- Private, Corporal and Sergeant, 4th U.S. Cavalry, 20 Oct 1890–1893
- Second Lieutenant, 5th U.S. Infantry, 7 Oct 1893
- Transferred to 7th Cavalry, 30 Nov 1894, became Lieutenant
- Captain. 1st U.S. Volunteer Cavalry, 10 May 1898

Capron married Lillian Morris on 12 August 1896.

When the Spanish–American War broke out, Capron raised a troop of Rough Riders from the Old West (now Oklahoma) to serve as volunteer cavalry in Cuba. Theodore Roosevelt later wrote of Capron:

I think he was the ideal of what an American regular army officer should be. He was the fifth in descent from father to son who had served in the army of the United States, and in body and mind alike he was fitted to play his part to perfection. Tall and lithe ... a first-class rider and shot. ... He looked what he was, the archetype of the fighting man. [His] mastery of his art was so thorough and his performance of his own duty so rigid that he won at once not merely their admiration, but that soldierly affection ...

— Roosevelt, Theodore, The Rough Riders

== Battle and death ==
General William R. Shafter's corps of American soldiers arrived in Cuba after the declarations of war in 1898. Capron's regiment was commanded by Colonel Leonard Wood and Lieutenant Colonel (later President) Theodore Roosevelt. Colonel Wood granted Capron's request to lead the vanguard, ordering Capron to take his advance guard up a hill at Las Guasimas.

The forward unit of Capron's troop, commanded by Sergeant Hamilton Fish II, ran into Spanish gunfire on the hill. Capron rode up and found a dead Cuban scout and Sergeant Fish lying in the middle of the road. Bringing up his troops and leading them in action, Capron lay down to fire at the Spanish soldiers and was shot through the space between the left shoulder and neck with the bullet passing through the lungs and exiting out the right area in the waist.

Brought to the rear by a Rough Rider, Capron died on 24 June 1898. He was highly praised by his commanders, including Roosevelt and was awarded a posthumous Silver Star in 1925. His widow Lillian received the decoration.

After his body was returned to the United States, Capron was buried at Arlington National Cemetery in Arlington, Virginia on 27 July 1898. His wife was interred beside him after her death in 1937.
