= 1st U.S. Artillery, Battery E =

Battery E, 1st U.S. Artillery
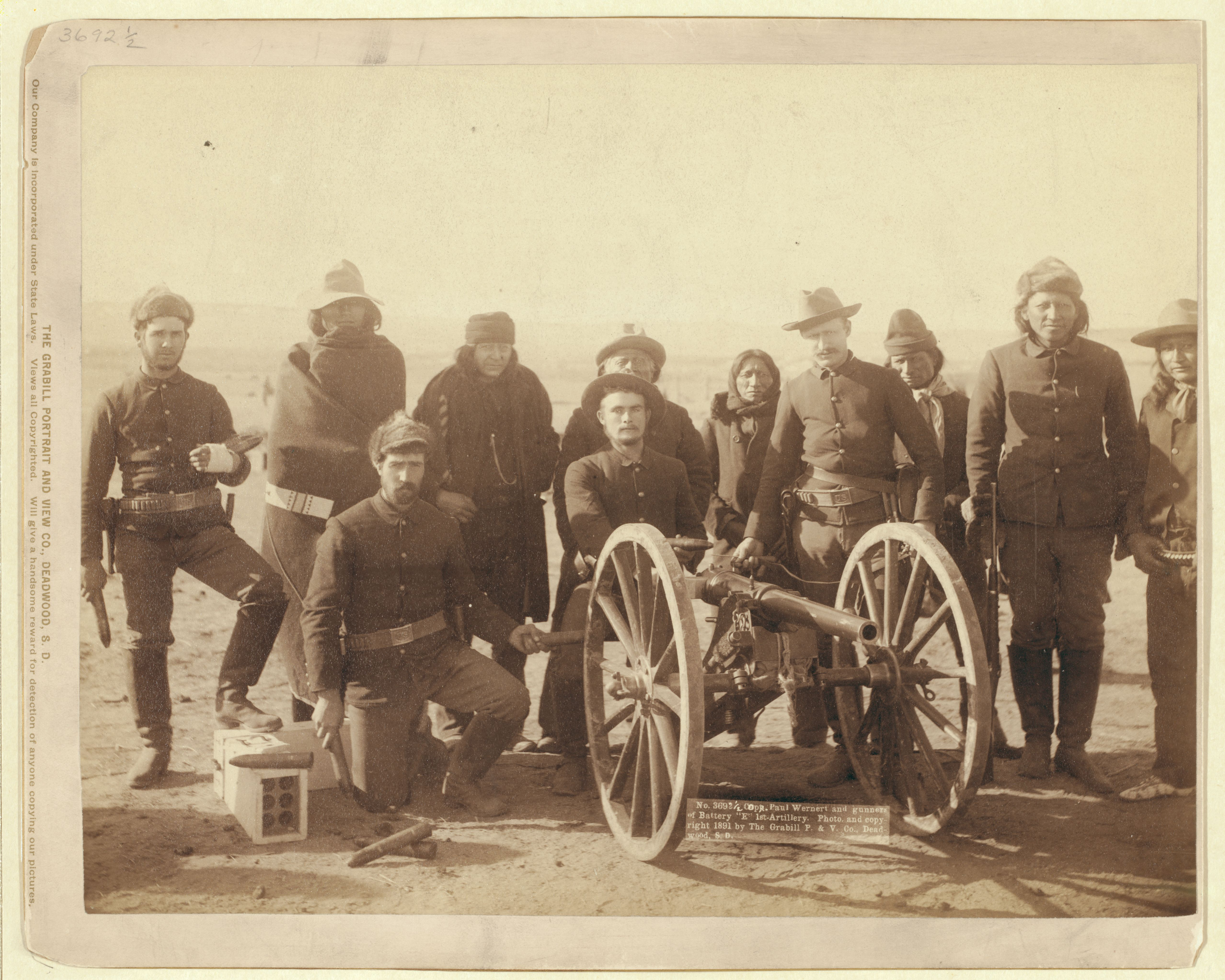
- Active: 1821–1901
- Country: United States
- Allegiance: Union
- Branch: Field Artillery Branch (United States)
- Engagements: Second Seminole War Mexican–American War: Battle of Palo Alto; Battle of Resaca de la Palma; Battle of Monterrey; Third Seminole War; American Civil War: Battle of Fort Sumter; Siege of Yorktown; Battle of Glendale; Battle of Malvern Hill; Second Battle of Bull Run; Battle of Antietam; Battle of Fredericksburg; Battle of Chancellorsville; Battle of Gettysburg; Bristoe Campaign; Mine Run Campaign; Overland Campaign; Indian Wars: Wounded Knee Massacre; Spanish–American War Philippine–American War

Battery E, 1st U.S. Artillery was a United States Army field artillery battery that was in service between 1821 and 1901, most notably in extensive service with the Union Army during the American Civil War.

During the Civil War, the battery was present at the Siege of Fort Sumter in April 1861 under the command of Captain Abner Doubleday. Returned to the artillery defenses of Washington, D.C., and rearmed as a field artillery battery, the unit was merged with Battery G, 1st U.S. Artillery in February 1862. Consolidated and renamed Battery E & G, 1st U.S. Artillery, the unit continued with this designation until the end of the war.

The unit is also known for its participation in the Wounded Knee Massacre in 1890.

== Service ==
Battery E, 1st U.S. Artillery was formed by a reorganization of the U.S. Army artillery service in 1821. The battery saw service in the Second Seminole War and the early engagements of the Mexican–American War.

From 1856 through 1858, the battery was stationed in Florida during the Third Seminole War.

At the outbreak of the Civil War, the battery was stationed at Fort Sumter, Charleston Harbor, South Carolina in January 1861, where it was present during the Battle of Fort Sumter in April which sparked the war. Following the surrender of that post, it moved to Washington, D.C., where it was attached to Patterson's army to October 1861, in the field but not present at the First Battle of Bull Run. Its new commander, Captain Jefferson C. Davis, was absent on detached service throughout the duration of the war; under the command of subaltern battery officer Lieutenant Alanson Merwin Randol, the battery was merged with Battery G, 1st U.S. Artillery in February 1862, serving as Battery E & G with the Artillery Reserve, Army of the Potomac, to May 1862; 2nd Brigade, Artillery Reserve, V Corps, Army of the Potomac, to September 1862; Artillery, 2nd Division, V Corps, to October 1862; Artillery, 3rd Division, V Corps, to May 1863; 2nd Regular Brigade, Artillery Reserve, Army of the Potomac, to June 1863; 2nd Brigade, Horse Artillery, Artillery Reserve, Army of the Potomac, to June 1864; 3rd Brigade, DeRussy's Division, XXII Corps, to July 1864; and 1st Brigade, DeRussy's Division, XXII Corps, to October 1865.

On garrison duty along the East Coast post-war, the battery also participated in the Indian Wars at Wounded Knee.

== Detailed service ==
Defense of Fort Sumter, Charleston Harbor, April 12–13, 1861. Evacuation of Fort Sumter April 13. Reached Fort Hamilton, New York Harbor, April 19. Moved to Chambersburg, Pennsylvania, June 3. Ordered to Washington, D.C., August 26, 1861. Duty at the federal arsenal and at Camp Duncan, defenses of Washington, until March 1862. Moved to the Virginia Peninsula. Siege of Yorktown April 5-May 4. Battle of Seven Pines, May 31-June 1. Seven Days Battles before Richmond June 26-July 1. Savage's Station and Peach Orchard June 29. White Oak Swamp and Glendale June 30. Malvern Hill July 1. At Harrison's Landing until August 16. Moved to Fortress Monroe, then to Centerville August 16–28. Pope's Virginia Campaign August 28-September 2. Battle of Groveton August 29. Second Battle of Bull Run August 30. Maryland Campaign September 6–22. Battle of Antietam September 16–17. Shepherdstown Ford September 19–20. At Sharpsburg until October 30. Movement to Falmouth, Virginia, October 29-November 19. Battle of Fredericksburg, December 11–15. At Falmouth, Virginia, until April 1863. Chancellorsville Campaign April 27-May 6. Battle of Chancellorsville May 1–5. Gettysburg Campaign June 11-July 24. Aldie June 17. Middleburg June 19. Upperville June 21. Ashby's Gap June 21. Battle of Gettysburg, July 1–3. Near Harpers Ferry July 14. Shepherdstown July 16. Bristoe Campaign October 9–22. Advanced to line of the Rappahannock November 7–8. Mine Run Campaign November 26-December 2. Custer's Raid into Albemarle County February 28-March 1, 1864. Near Charlottesville February 29. Stannardsville March 1. Rapidan Campaign May 4-June 8. Battle of the Wilderness May 5–7. Spotsylvania May 8–21. Milford Station May 21. Chesterfield May 23. North Anna River May 23–26. On line of the Pamunkey May 26–28. Totopotomoy May 28–31. Mechump's Creek May 31. Cold Harbor June 1–5. Sharp's Farm June 3. Moved to Washington, D.C., June 18. Garrison duty at Fort Willard and Fort Strong, defenses of Washington, D.C., until October 1865.

== Later service ==
One of the most notable actions of Battery E, 1st U.S. Artillery was in support of the Colonel James W. Forsyth's 7th U.S. Cavalry at the now-controversial engagement at Wounded Knee on December 29, 1890. The battery was commanded by Captain Allyn Capron and equipped with four Hotchkiss M1875 mountain guns which were used against the Wounded Knee encampment with devastating effect after the fight broke out. Some estimates report that as many as 200 Lakota Indians were killed or wounded in the engagement, the majority of whom were women and children.

The battery participated in the Spanish–American War in Cuba in 1898, under the command of Captain Capron.

In 1899, the battery was deployed to the Philippine Islands during the Philippine–American War; it remained there until 1901, when the unit was dissolved and reorganized as the First Battery, Field Artillery in the newly organized Artillery Corps of the United States Army.

== Commanders ==
- Captain Sylvester Churchill
- Captain Henry Saunders
- Captain Ebenezer Sibley
- Captain James Henry Prentiss
- Captain William H. French
- Captain Abner Doubleday
- Captain Jefferson C. Davis
- Lieutenant Samuel S. Elder
- Captain Alanson M. Randol
- 1st Lieutenant Egbert Worth Olcott
- 1st Lieutenant Frank Sands French
- Lieutenant Edward Alexander Duer
- Captain Franck Eveleigh Taylor
- Captain Tully McCrea
- Captain Allyn Capron
- Captain Henry Merritt Andrews

== See also ==
- List of United States Regular Army Civil War units
- 1st Air Defense Artillery Regiment
