= 1st U.S. Artillery, Battery G =

1st U.S. Light Artillery, Battery "G"
- Active: 1861 - 1865
- Country: United States
- Allegiance: Union
- Branch: Field Artillery Branch (United States)
- Engagements: First Battle of Bull Run (one section); Siege of Yorktown; Battle of Seven Pines; Seven Days Battles; Battle of Savage's Station; Battle of White Oak Swamp; Battle of Malvern Hill; Second Battle of Bull Run; Battle of Antietam; Battle of Fredericksburg; Battle of Chancellorsville; Battle of Gettysburg; Bristoe Campaign; Mine Run Campaign; Battle of the Wilderness; Battle of North Anna; Battle of Totopotomoy Creek; Battle of Cold Harbor

Battery "G" 1st Regiment of Artillery was a light artillery battery that served in the Union Army during the American Civil War.

== Service ==
The battery was stationed at Fort Pickens, Florida, January to May 1861. It moved to Fort Hamilton, New York Harbor, May 13–26, then to Washington, D.C., July 8 where it was attached to Richardson's Brigade, Tyler's Division, McDowell's Army of Northeastern Virginia, to August 1861. Richardson's Brigade, Division of the Potomac, to October 1861. Artillery Reserve, Army of the Potomac (temporarily attached to Batteries E and K, 1st U.S. Artillery, February to May 1862. 2nd Brigade, Artillery Reserve, V Corps, Army of the Potomac, to September 1862. Artillery, 2nd Division, V Corps, to October 1862. Artillery, 3rd Division, V Corps, to May 1863. 2nd Regular Brigade, Artillery Reserve, Army of the Potomac, to June 1863. 2nd Brigade, Horse Artillery, Army of the Potomac, to June 1864. 1st Brigade, DeRussy's Division, XXII Corps, to October 1865.

== Detailed service ==
Reconnaissance from Alexandria on Fairfax, Richmond and Mt. Vernon Roads July 14. Advanced on Manassas, Va., July 16–21. Occupation of Fairfax Court House July 17. Blackburn's Ford July 18. First Battle of Bull Run July 21. Duty in the defenses of Washington, D.C., until March, 1862. Moved to the Virginia Peninsula. Siege of Yorktown April 5-May 4. Battle of Seven Pines, May 31-June 1. Seven Days Battles before Richmond June 26-July 1. Golding's Farm June 27. Savage's Station and Peach Orchard June 29. White Oak Swamp and Glendale June 30. Malvern Hill July 1. At Harrison's Landing until August 16. Moved to Fort Monroe, then to Centerville August 16–28. Pope's campaign in Virginia August 28-September 2. Battle of Groveton August 29. Second Battle of Bull Run August 30. Maryland Campaign September 6–22. Crampton's Pass September 14. Battle of Antietam September 16–17. Shepherdstown Ford September 19–20. At Sharpsburg, Md., until October 30. Moved to Falmouth October 30-November 19. Battle of Fredericksburg, Va., December 11–15. At Falmouth until April 1863. Chancellorsville Campaign April 27-May 6. Battle of Chancellorsville May 1–6. Gettysburg Campaign June 11-July 24. Aldie June 17. Middleburg June 19. Upperville June 20–21. Ashby's Gap June 21. Battle of Gettysburg, July 1–3. Shepherdstown July 16. Bristoe Campaign October 9–22. Advanced to line of the Rappahannock November 7–8. Mine Run Campaign November 26-December 2. Custer's Raid into Albemarle County February 28-March 1. Near Charlottesville February 29. Stannardsville March 1. Rapidan Campaign May 4-June 5. Battle of the Wilderness May 5–7. Spotsylvania May 8–21. Milford Station May 21. Chesterfield May 23. North Anna May 23–26. Totopotomoy May 28–31. Machump's Creek May 31. Cold Harbor June 1–5. Sharp's Farm June 3. Moved to Washington, D.C., June 18. Garrison duty at Fort Willard and Fort Strong, defenses of Washington, D.C. until October 1865.

== Commanders ==
- Captain Alanson Merwin Randol
- 1st Lieutenant Frank S. French
- 1st Lieutenant Peter Conover Hains - commanded at the First Battle of Bull Run
- 1st Lieutenant Egbert W. Olcott

== See also ==
- List of United States Regular Army Civil War units
- 1st Air Defense Artillery Regiment
