= 1st Wisconsin Heavy Artillery Regiment =

1st Regiment Wisconsin Heavy Artillery
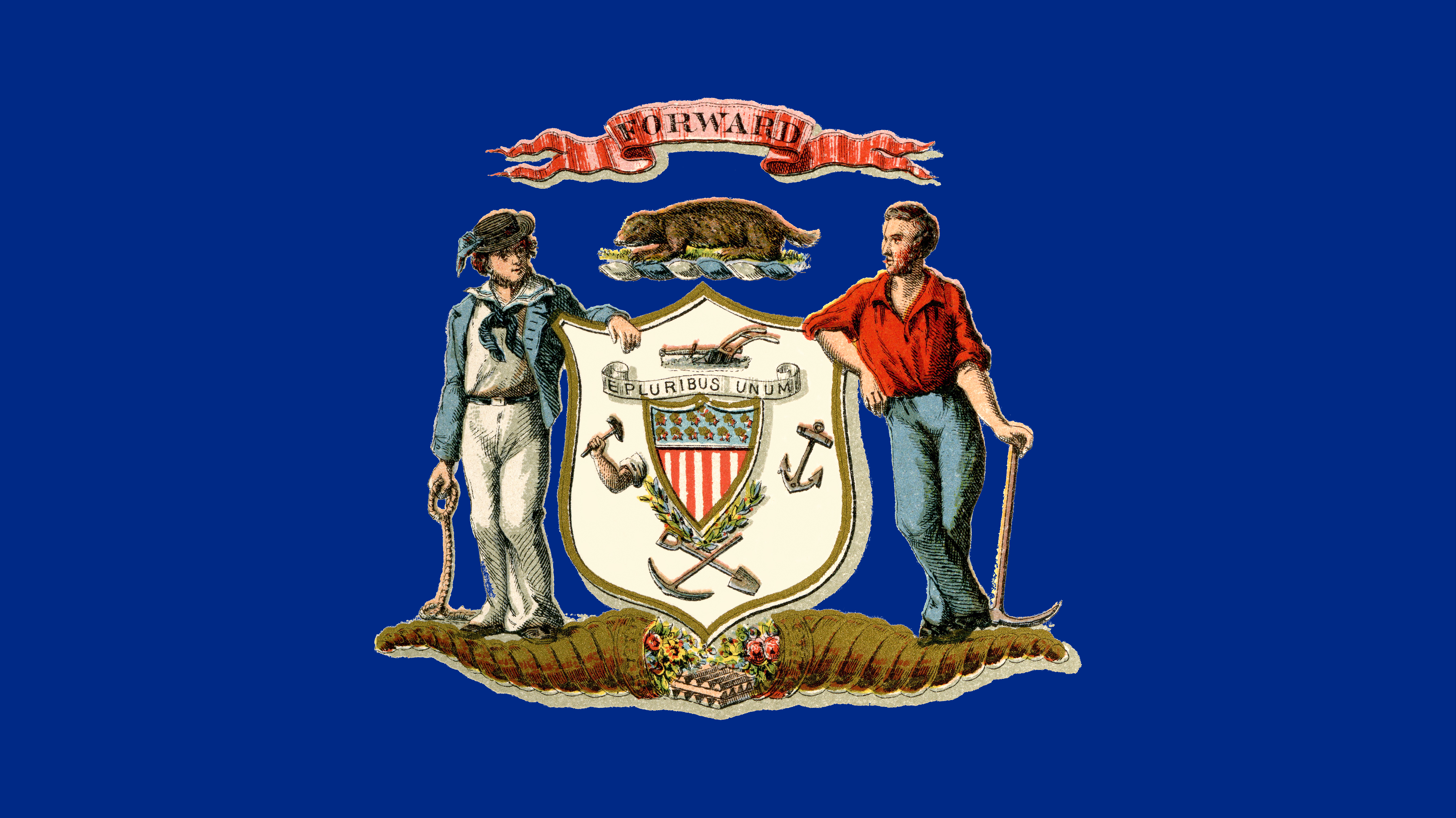
- Active: December 9, 1861, to September 21, 1865
- Country: United States
- Allegiance: Union
- Branch: Artillery

The 1st Regiment Wisconsin Heavy Artillery was an artillery regiment that served in the Union Army during the American Civil War.

== Service ==
The 1st Wisconsin Heavy Artillery was originally organized by companies over a considerable period of time and did not serve together as a complete regiment.

- Battery "A" was created from Company "K," 2nd Wisconsin Volunteer Infantry Regiment on December 9, 1861, in the Washington, D.C. defenses, assigned at various times to Fort Cass, Fort Buffalo, Fort Ellsworth, Fort Worth, Battery Rodgers and Fort Willard. The battery was mustered out on August 18, 1865.
- Battery "B" was organized at Milwaukee, Wisconsin, in September 1863 and was assigned to Fort Terrell at Murfreesboro, Tennessee and remained there until January 4, 1864. It spent the remainder of the war at Fort Clay at Lexington, Kentucky and was mustered out on August 30, 1865.
- Battery "C" was sent to Chattanooga, Tennessee, on October 30, 1863, and served in various stations in that state. The battery mustered out on September 21, 1865.
- Battery "D" was mustered in on November 7, 1863, and was transferred to New Orleans, Louisiana, on February 9, 1864, and remained there to July, 1864. The battery was transferred to the District of LaFourche, Louisiana, in the Department of the Gulf until June, 1865. It mustered out of Federal service on August 18, 1865.
- Batteries "E," "F," "G," "H," "I," "K," "L" and "M" were organized in September and October, 1864 and were sent to Washington, D.C.
  - Company "E" was assigned to Fort O'Rourke.
  - Company "F" was assigned to Fort Ellsworth.
  - Companies "G" and "H" were assigned Fort Lyon.
  - Company "I" was assigned to Fort Farnsworth.
  - Company "K" was assigned to Fort Lyon.
  - Company "L" was assigned to Fort Willard.
  - Company "M" was assigned to Forts Lyon, Fort Weed and Fort Farnsworth.

Batteries "E" to "M" were mustered out on June 26, 1865.

== Total strength and casualties ==
The 1st Wisconsin Heavy Artillery initially recruited 1,777 officers and men. An additional 386 men were recruited as replacements, for a total of 2,163 men.

The regiment suffered 4 enlisted men killed or died from wounds in action, and 2 officers and 77 enlisted men who died of disease, for a total of 83 fatalities.

== Notable people ==
- Francis J. Borchardt, member of the Wisconsin State Assembly
- David C. Fulton, member of the Wisconsin State Assembly
- Richard W. Hubbell, member of the Wisconsin State Assembly
- Gilbert E. McKeeby, member of the Wisconsin State Senate
- Henry Powell, member of the Wisconsin State Assembly
- William T. Pugh, member of the Wisconsin State Assembly
- George Washington Putnam, member of the Wisconsin State Assembly
- Patrick Henry Ray, later a brigadier general in the U.S. Army
- William M. Williams, Jr., member of the Wisconsin State Assembly

== See also ==
- List of Wisconsin Civil War units
- Wisconsin in the American Civil War
