= Fort Willard =

Historical fort and park in Fairfax County, Virginia, United States

Coordinates: 38°46′58.1″N 77°3′58.1″W

- Part of the Civil War defenses of Washington, D.C.
- Fairfax County, Virginia, USA
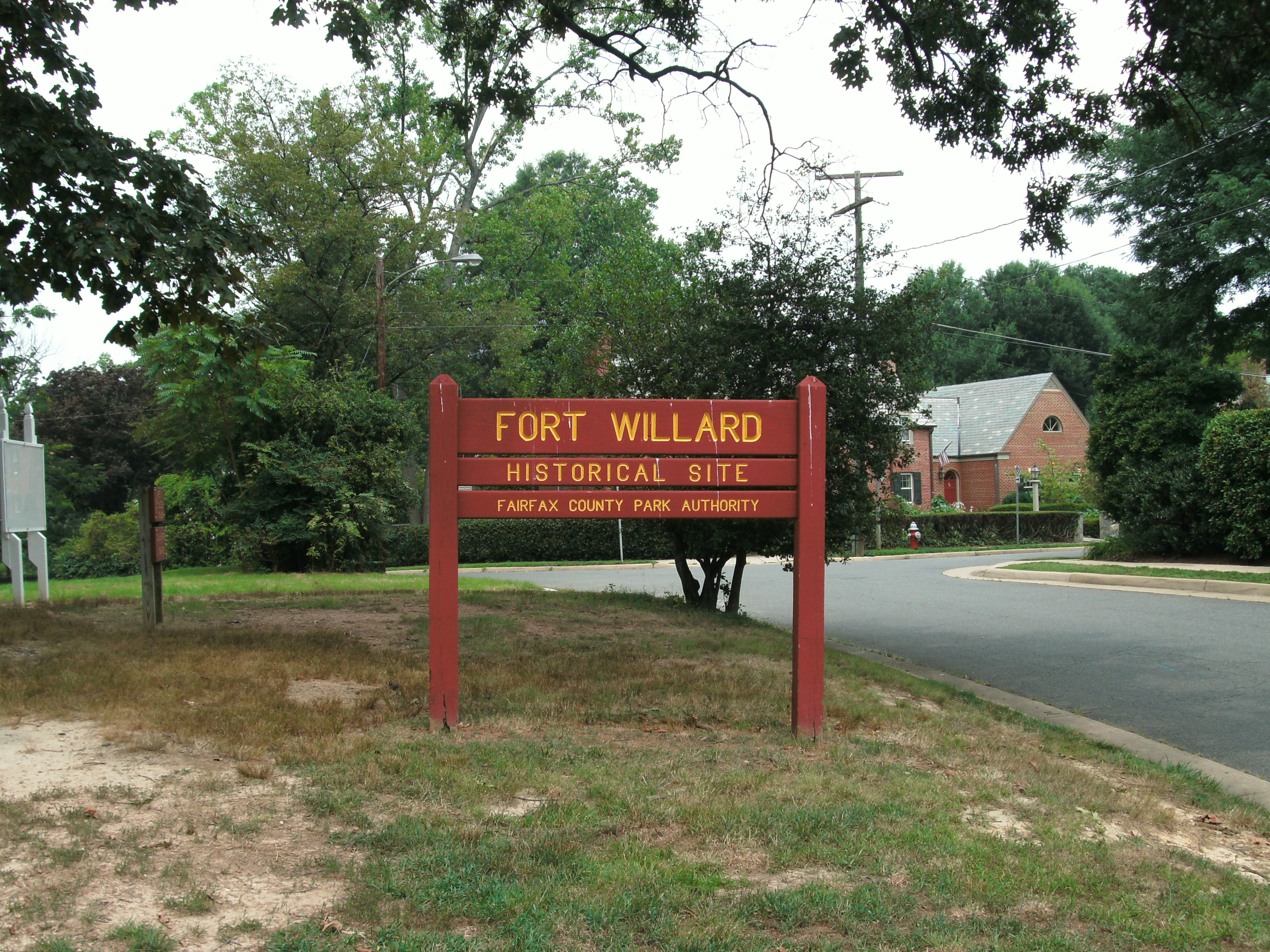
- Entrance to Fort Willard

Site information
- Type: Earthwork fort
- Owner: Fairfax County Park Authority
- Controlled by: Union Army
- Open to the public: Yes
- Condition: Stabilized

Site history
- Built: 1862–1863
- Built by: 34th Massachusetts Volunteer Infantry
- In use: 1862–1865
- Materials: Earth, timber
- Demolished: 1865
- Battles/wars: American Civil War

Fort Willard is a former Union Army installation now located in the Belle Haven area of Fairfax County in the U.S. state of Virginia. It is currently undergoing preservation treatment to protect its earthen walls and trenches.

== Occupation of Northern Virginia ==
Following the surrender of Fort Sumter in Charleston, South Carolina, on April 14, 1861, President Abraham Lincoln declared that "an insurrection existed," and called for 75,000 troops to be called up to quash the rebellion. The move sparked resentment in many other southern states, which promptly moved to convene discussions of secession. The Virginia State Convention passed an ordinance of secession and ordered a May 23 referendum to decide whether or not the state should secede from the Union. The U.S. Army responded by creating the Department of Washington, which united all Union troops in the District of Columbia and Maryland under one command.

Brigadier General J.F.K. Mansfield, commander of the Department of Washington, argued that Northern Virginia should be occupied as soon as possible in order to prevent the possibility of the Confederate Army mounting artillery on the hills of Arlington and shelling government buildings in Washington. He also urged the erection of fortifications on the Virginia side of the Potomac River to protect the southern terminuses of the Chain Bridge, Long Bridge, and Aqueduct Bridge. His superiors approved these recommendations, but decided to wait until after Virginia voted for or against secession.

On May 23, 1861, Virginia voted by a margin of 3 to 1 in favor of leaving the Union. That night, U.S. Army troops began crossing the bridges linking Washington, D.C. to Virginia.

=== Taking the High Ground ===
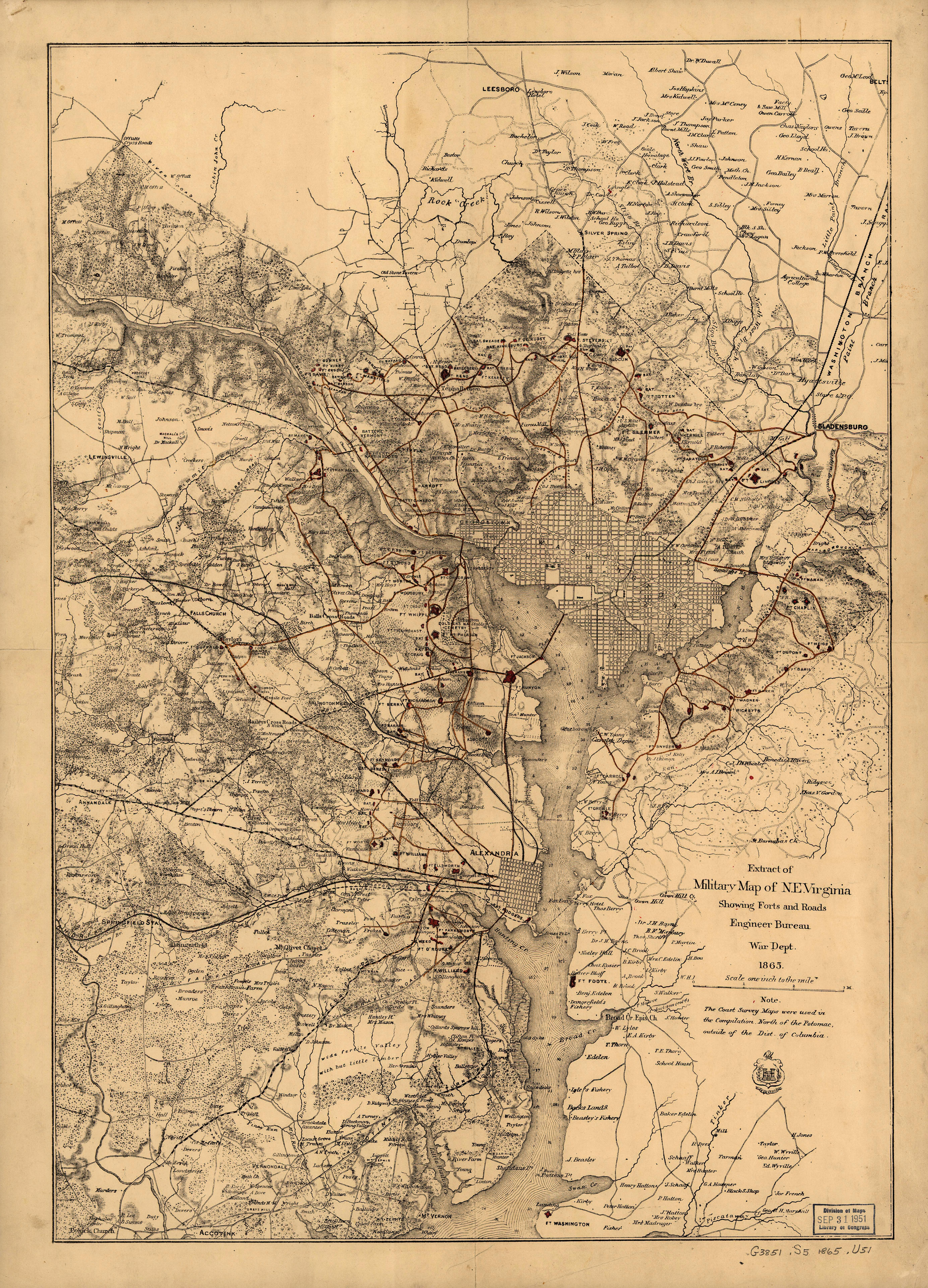
Washington D.C. Fortifications map

Over the seven weeks that followed the occupation of northern Virginia, forts were constructed along the banks of the Potomac River and at the approaches to each of the three major bridges (Chain Bridge, Long Bridge, and Aqueduct Bridge) connecting Virginia to Washington and Georgetown.

While the Potomac River forts were being built, planning and surveying was ordered for an enormous new ring of forts to protect the city. Unlike the fortifications under construction, the new forts would defend the city in all directions, not just the most direct route through Arlington. In mid-July, this work was interrupted by the First Battle of Bull Run. As the Army of Northeastern Virginia marched south to Manassas, the soldiers previously assigned to construction duties marched instead to battle. In the days that followed the Union defeat at Bull Run, panicked efforts were made to defend Washington from what was perceived as an imminent Confederate attack. The makeshift trenches and earthworks that resulted were largely confined to Arlington and the direct approaches to Washington.

On July 26, 1861, five days after the battle, Maj. Gen. George B. McClellan was named commander of the military district of Washington and the subsequently renamed Army of the Potomac. Upon arriving in Washington, McClellan was appalled by the condition of the city's defenses.

In no quarter were the dispositions for defense such as to offer a vigorous resistance to a respectable body of the enemy, either in the position and numbers of the troops or the number and character of the defensive works... not a single defensive work had been commenced on the Maryland side. There was nothing to prevent the enemy shelling the city from heights within easy range, which could be occupied by a hostile column almost without resistance.

To remedy the situation, one of McClellan's first orders upon taking command was to greatly expand the defenses of Washington. At all points of the compass, forts and entrenchments would be constructed in sufficient strength to defeat any attack. Alexandria, which contained the southern terminus of the Chesapeake and Ohio Canal and one of the largest ports in the Chesapeake Bay, was an object of "anxious study."

== Planning and construction ==
Fort Willard was constructed during the latter part of 1862 and early 1863 as Redoubt "D" to Fort Lyon by detachments of the 34th Massachusetts Volunteer Infantry. Lieutenant Colonel William S. Lincoln of the 34th Massachusetts explains in his memoirs that on January 8, 1863 General Barnard, along with a "party of engineers,"

spent the day running lines for an additional Fort, to be connected by covered ways and rifle pits, with the redoubts we have been constructing; and Lieutenant Schenck [engineer in charge] communicates the not very agreeable information, that the 34th will be required to build the new works. Colonel Wells chafes at this, and says that if we continue our work as we have begun, we shall be converted into a regiment of Engineers.

The fort was named in honor of Colonel George L. Willard, who was killed at the Battle of Gettysburg, on July 2, 1863. The fort was a small, unflanked enclosure with a bombproof and a magazine. The fort had emplacements for fifteen guns, and its armaments consisted of two 24-pound siege guns, two 12-pound howitzers, four 4.5-inch ordnance rifles, four 6-pound guns, two 10-inch siege mortars and two 24-pounder Coehorn mortars.

It originally contained three barracks, a guardhouse, officers quarters, a cook house and ordnance sergeants' quarters. Two detached batteries supported the fort. These features have all been displaced by construction of the community around the fort in the 1930s.

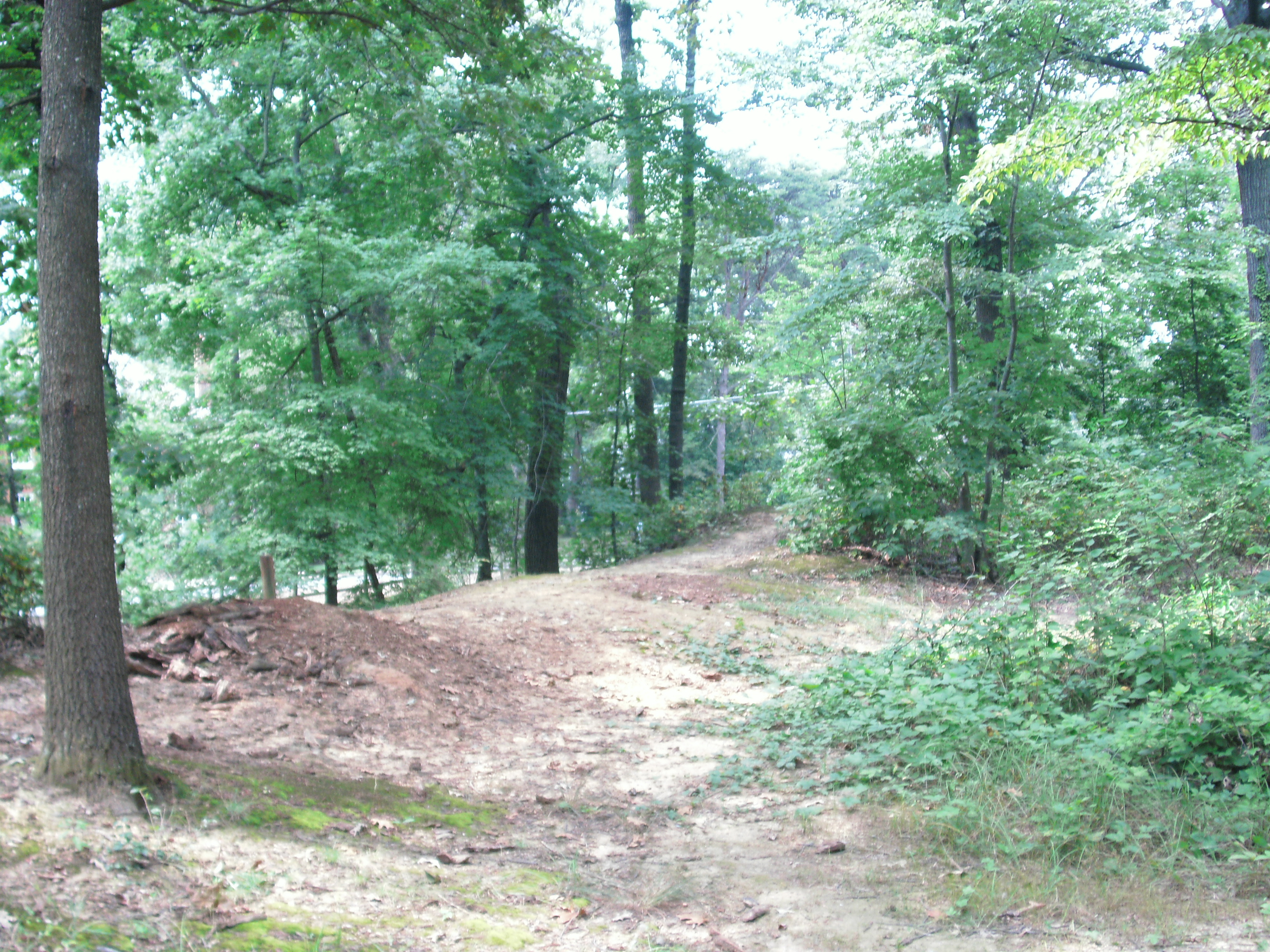
The grounds of the fort as seen in 2009

Some of the regiments garrisoned at Fort Willard included:

- 34th Massachusetts Volunteer Infantry
- 2nd Connecticut Heavy Artillery
- 10th New York Heavy Artillery Regiment
- 1st U.S. Artillery, Battery G
- 1st U.S. Artillery, Battery E
- 1st Wisconsin Heavy Artillery Regiment

== Fort Willard Historic Site ==
Fort Willard Historic Site is located at 6625 Fort Willard Circle, Alexandria, Virginia 22307-1168. This park contains significant remains of a fort built by the Union Army. The principal features remaining on site consist of earthen fortifications, cannon embrasures or platforms and the remains of a bombproof (bomb shelter) and magazine (arms and gunpowder storage) area. It is owned and maintained by the Fairfax County Park Authority which has designated it as a Resource-based Park. On October 15, 2011, there was a ribbon cutting for a restoration and interpretive program.
