= George L. Willard =

United States Army officer (1827–1863)

George Lamb Willard
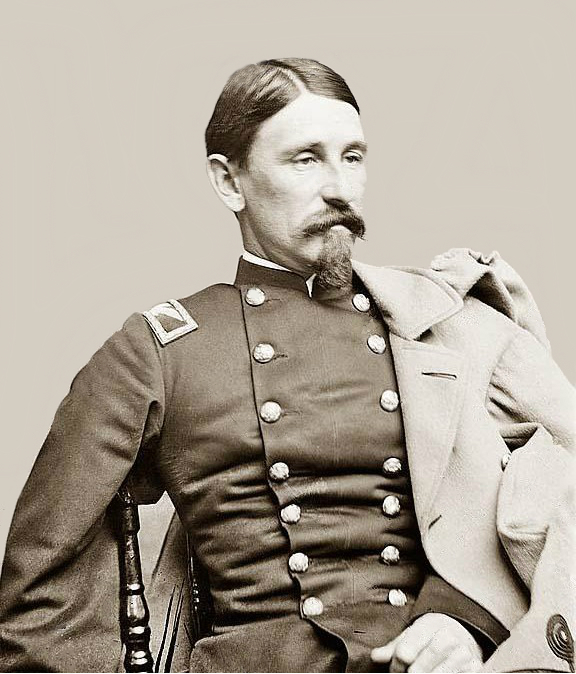
- Col. George L. Willard
- Born: August 15, 1827; New York City, US
- Died: July 2, 1863 (aged 35); Gettysburg, Pennsylvania, US
- Spouse: Mary Gould Plum Willard
- Military career
- Allegiance: United States; Union
- Branch: United States Army; Union Army
- Service years: 1847–1863
- Rank: Colonel
- Units: 15th U.S. Infantry; 8th U.S. Infantry; 19th U. S. Infantry
- Commands: 125th New York Infantry; 3rd Bde, 3rd Div, II Corps
- Conflicts: Mexican-American War: Battle of Chapultepec; American Civil War: Peninsula Campaign; Battle of Harper's Ferry (POW); Battle of Gettysburg †

George Lamb Willard (August 15, 1827 – July 2, 1863) was an officer in the United States Army who served in the Mexican-American War and the American Civil War. He lost his life leading a brigade in the II Corps at the Battle of Gettysburg. Colonel Willard was the namesake of Fort Willard.

== Early life and career ==
George L. Willard was born in New York City on August 15, 1827. In 1847 he enlisted in the 15th U.S. Infantry and served in the Mexican-American War. By the war's end, Willard had reached the rank of sergeant. For his part in the war he was made a Second Lieutenant in the 8th U.S. Infantry. Willard served in the regular service until the outbreak of the Civil War, rising to the rank of captain. At the outbreak of the war Willard was unwilling to give up his regular commission and so he missed any chance to command a regiment of volunteers. He served with his regiment during the Peninsula Campaign.

== Civil War ==
=== Harpers Ferry ===
In late 1862, Willard—by then a major in the 19th U. S. Infantry—organized and became colonel of the 125th New York Volunteer Infantry Regiment. Willard was allowed to retain his commission in the regular army. He suffered misfortune while commanding his regiment at Harpers Ferry, West Virginia, in 1862. His raw recruits did not distinguish themselves in the Battle of Harpers Ferry, in which they fell apart under fire during the fighting on Bolivar Heights. They were too frightened, especially by the enfilade fire coming in from Loudon Heights to rally. When the garrison was surrendered to Stonewall Jackson by Col. Dixon S. Miles, Willard and his men became prisoners of war.

When the 125th was paroled in early 1863, Willard was in charge until it was exchanged for captured Confederate troops. During that period, the New Yorkers were encamped at Camp Douglas in Chicago, Illinois. Then they were assigned to the defenses of Washington, D.C. in the division of Brig. Gen. Silas Casey, part of a brigade of New York veterans of Harpers Ferry led by Brig. Gen. Alexander Hays. The brigade became the third in Casey's division of the XXII Corps in February 1863. Willard testified before the military commission that investigated the surrender of Harpers Ferry and was critical of the conduct of Miles. He also was quoted by another officer as thinking the garrison's commander unfit to be in charge.

=== Gettysburg ===
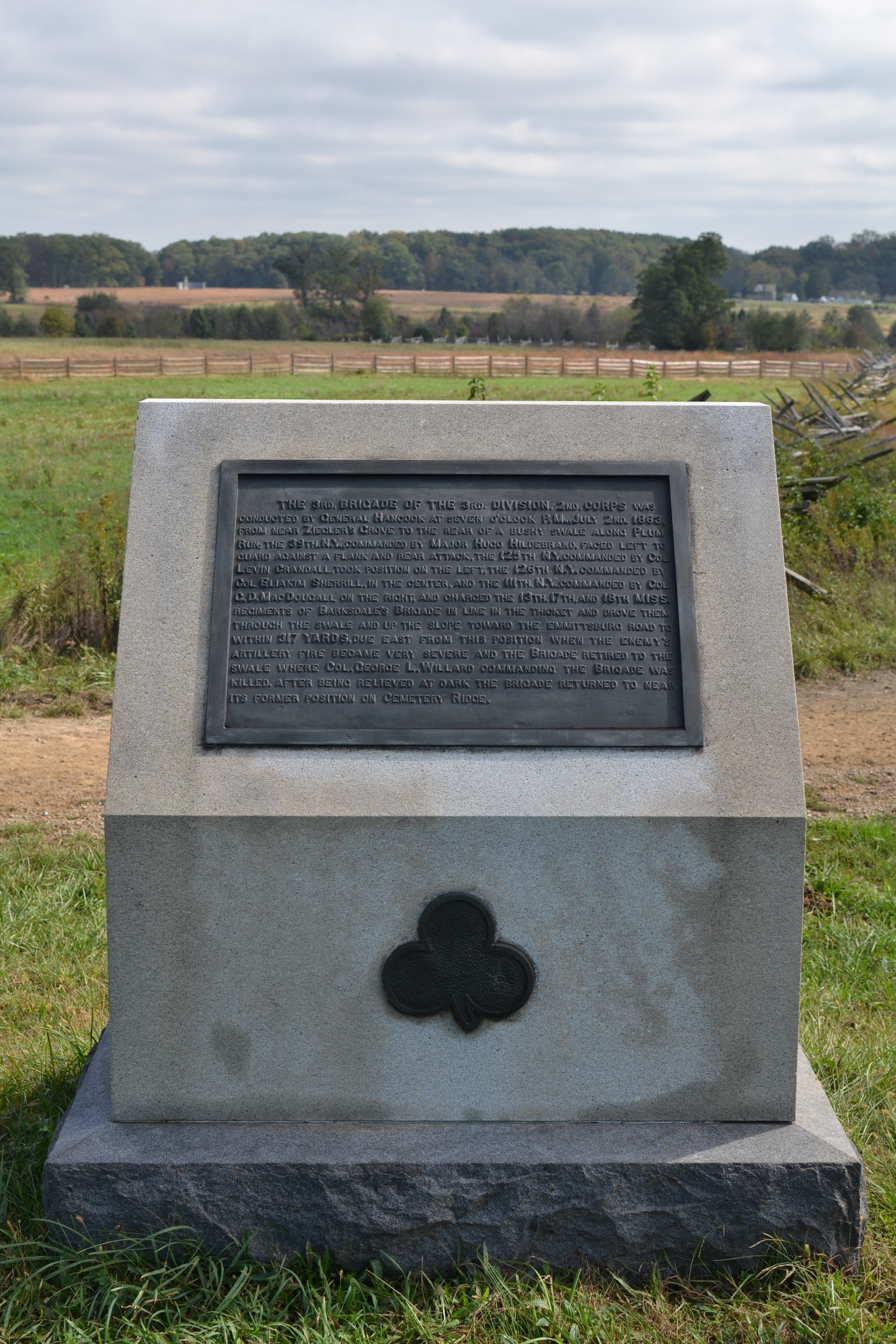
Monument to Willard's Brigade at Gettysburg

The units of the "Harper's Ferry Brigade" joined the Army of the Potomac on June 28, 1863. They were assigned to II Corps, where they became the 3rd Brigade, 3rd Division under General Hays. The veterans of the corps did not greet the "Harpers Ferry Cowards" kindly until they had proven their courage in combat. The division commander Maj. Gen. William H. French had been assigned to the Middle Department and Hays replaced him. Willard duly succeeded by seniority to command of the brigade; which now consisted of the 39th, 111th, 125th and 126th New York regiments.

The 3rd Brigade marched northward in heat and dust of the summer of 1863, halting at Uniontown, Maryland, on June 30. The grueling march had caused many to fall out of the ranks, joining only when the division encamped. On July 1, when the division crossed into Pennsylvania, the third brigade was at the rear of the column, guarding the wagon train. Reaching Gettysburg, Pennsylvania late on July 1, Willard's command camped along the Taneytown Road behind the Round Tops. Early on July 2, the brigade moved up to Cemetery Ridge, taking a position near the Bryan farm.

Late on July 2, when Maj. Gen. Winfield S. Hancock had been placed in charge of the Army's endangered left flank, he sent back to his II Corps for reinforcements. A courier found Hays and Willard together. Hays ordered Willard to take his brigade to the left and "knock the Hell" out of the Confederates. Hancock appeared and led Willard's brigade to the left himself. Forming a line of battle just north of Weikert's Woods, the brigade had three regiments in line with a fourth in reserve (That regiment participated in repulsing the Confederate brigade of Brig. Gen. Cadmus Wilcox.).

Willard's men stopped the advance of Brig. Gen. William Barksdale, who had captured the Union position at the Peach Orchard and then pressed forward toward Cemetery Ridge. Willard ordered the two regiments on his right forward, pushing the Confederates back. Some of Willard's men are reported to have yelled, as they charged, "Remember Harpers Ferry!". The New Yorkers recovered abandoned Union guns, but came under heavy fire from Confederate artillery after crossing Plum Run. Willard had just ordered his men back to their start line when he was hit in the face by an artillery round. He died on the spot, leaving command of the brigade to Col. Eliakim Sherrill. The brigade report, filed by Lt. Col. James M. Bull of the 126th New York, gives a detailed account of this counterattack.

His body was recovered and transported back to his family.

== Memorials ==
Fort Willard in the defenses of Washington, D. C. was named for the fallen colonel.

A small monument—dedicated in 1888—stands on the Gettysburg battlefield near where Willard fell.

Camp #154 of the Sons of Union Veterans of the Civil War in Albany, New York is named for Willard.
