= Francis J. Borchardt =

American politician

Francis J. Borchardt (1849–1915) was a member of the Wisconsin State Assembly.

== Biography ==
Borchardt was born September 25, 1849, in Schrimm, Prussian Province of Posen (Śrem, Poland) . He moved to Milwaukee, Wisconsin in 1853. During the American Civil War, he served with the 1st Wisconsin Heavy Artillery Regiment of the Union Army. Afterwards, he became an officer in the Wisconsin Army National Guard.

== Political career ==
Borchardt was a member of the Assembly in 1882. Previously, he was elected a justice of the peace in 1877, 1879 and 1881.
