= William M. Williams Jr. =

American politician

William M. Williams Jr. was a member of the Wisconsin State Assembly.

== Biography ==
Williams was born on July 11, 1846, in Lake, Milwaukee County, Wisconsin. During the American Civil War, he served with the 1st Wisconsin Heavy Artillery Regiment of the Union Army, achieving the rank of sergeant. Williams died on December 23, 1918.

== Political career ==
Williams was a member of the Assembly in 1882. Additionally, he was Postmaster of Oak Creek, Wisconsin. He was a Republican.
