= George Washington Putnam =

19th century American politician

George W. Putnam

Member of the Wisconsin State Assembly from the Richland 2nd district
- In office January 1, 1872 – January 5, 1874
- Preceded by: Elihu Bailey (whole county)
- Succeeded by: Philip M. Smith

Personal details
- Born: March 24, 1826 Andover, Vermont, U.S.
- Died: March 4, 1899 (aged 72) Plymouth, Vermont, U.S.
- Resting place: Ash Ridge Cemetery, Sylvan, Wisconsin
- Party: Republican
- Spouses: Martha Rebecca Brewer (m. 1850; died 1892); Sarah Almeda Brewer (m. 1893–1899)
- Children: Ossian D. Putnam^{(died 1852)}; George Henry Putnam^{(b. 1853; died 1915)}; Arthur L. Putnam^{(b. 1858; died 1938)}; Fred Ellsworth Putnam^{(b. 1861; died 1943)}; Addison Lincoln Putnam^{(b. 1871; died 1957)}
- Occupation: Farmer

Military service
- Allegiance: United States
- Branch/service: United States Volunteers; Union Army
- Years of service: 1864–1865
- Rank: Sergeant, USV
- Unit: 1st Reg. Wis. Heavy Artillery
- Battles/wars: American Civil War

George Washington Putnam (March 24, 1826 – March 4, 1899) was an American farmer, livestock dealer, and Wisconsin pioneer. He was a member of the Wisconsin State Assembly, representing the western half of Richland County during the 1872 and 1873 sessions.

== Biography ==
Putnam was born on March 24, 1826, in Andover, Vermont. He later attended Black River Academy in Ludlow (village), Vermont. He relocated to Wisconsin in 1856. During the American Civil War, Putnam served with the 1st Wisconsin Heavy Artillery Regiment of the Union Army. He died in Plymouth, Vermont, in 1899.

== Assembly career ==
Putnam was a member of the Assembly during the 1872 and 1873 sessions. He was a Republican.

Wisconsin State Assembly
Preceded by Elihu Bailey (whole county)	Member of the Wisconsin State Assembly from the Richland 2nd district January 1, 1872 – January 5, 1874	Succeeded by Philip M. Smith
