= Fort Ellsworth =

- Part of the Civil War defenses of Washington, D.C.
- Alexandria, Virginia
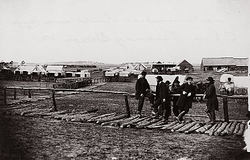
- Brady Photograph of Fort Ellsworth

Site information
- Type: Earthwork fort
- Controlled by: Union Army
- Condition: Dismantled

Location
- Coordinates: 38.80600°N 77.06867°W

Site history
- Built: 1861
- Built by: U.S. Army Corps of Engineers
- In use: 1861–1865
- Materials: Earth, timber
- Demolished: 1865
- Battles/wars: American Civil War

Fort Ellsworth was a timber and earthwork fortification constructed west of Alexandria, Virginia, as part of the defenses of Washington, D.C. during the American Civil War. Built in the weeks following the Union defeat at Bull Run, Fort Ellsworth was situated on a hill north of Hunting Creek, and Cameron Run, (which feeds into it). From its position on one of the highest points west of Alexandria, the fort overlooked the Orange and Alexandria Railroad, the Little River Turnpike, and the southern approaches to the city of Alexandria, the largest settlement in Union-occupied Northern Virginia.

== Occupation of Alexandria ==
The occupation of Northern Virginia was peaceful, with the sole exception of the town of Alexandria. There, as Colonel Elmer E. Ellsworth, commander of the New York Fire Zouaves (11th New York Volunteer Infantry Regiment), entered a local hotel to remove the Confederate flag flying above it, he was shot and killed by James Jackson, the proprietor. Ellsworth was one of the first men killed in the American Civil War. Throughout the remainder of the war, Alexandria would lean strongly towards the Confederate government, necessitating continued occupation by a Union garrison.

=== Washington D.C. fortifications ===
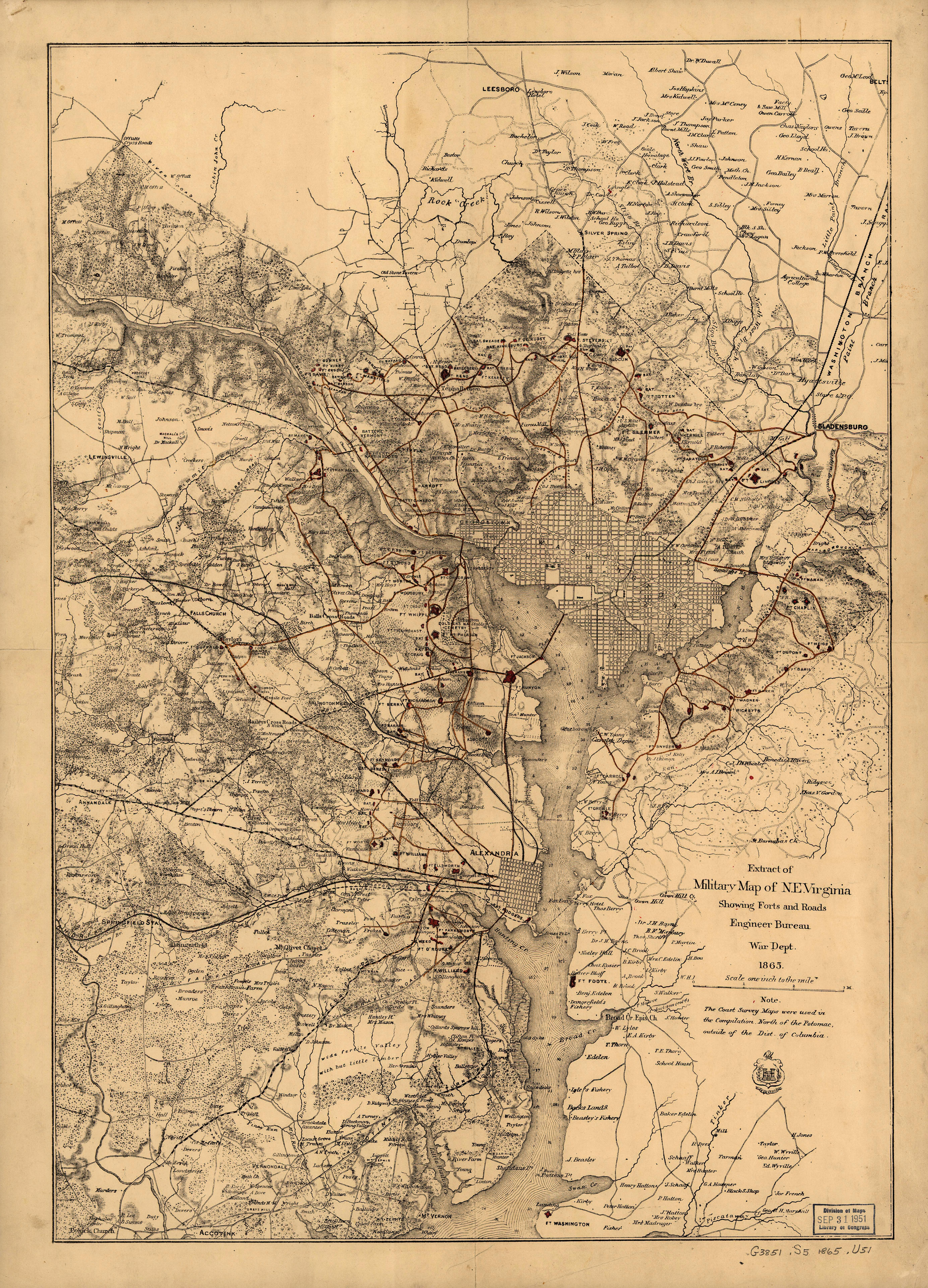
Washington D.C. Fortifications map

Over the seven weeks that followed the occupation of northern Virginia, forts were constructed along the banks of the Potomac River and at the approaches to each of the three major bridges (Chain Bridge, Long Bridge, and Aqueduct Bridge) connecting Virginia to Washington and Georgetown.

While the Potomac River forts were being built, planning and surveying was ordered for an enormous new ring of forts to protect the city. Unlike the fortifications under construction, the new forts would defend the city in all directions, not just the most direct route through Arlington. In mid-July, this work was interrupted by the First Battle of Bull Run. As the Army of Northeastern Virginia marched south to Manassas, the soldiers previously assigned to construction duties marched instead to battle. In the days that followed the Union defeat at Bull Run, panicked efforts were made to defend Washington from what was perceived as an imminent Confederate attack. The makeshift trenches and earthworks that resulted were largely confined to Arlington and the direct approaches to Washington.

On July 26, 1861, five days after the battle, Maj. Gen. George B. McClellan was named commander of the military district of Washington and the subsequently renamed Army of the Potomac. Upon arriving in Washington, McClellan was appalled by the condition of the city's defenses.

In no quarter were the dispositions for defense such as to offer a vigorous resistance to a respectable body of the enemy, either in the position and numbers of the troops or the number and character of the defensive works... not a single defensive work had been commenced on the Maryland side. There was nothing to prevent the enemy shelling the city from heights within easy range, which could be occupied by a hostile column almost without resistance.

To remedy the situation, one of McClellan's first orders upon taking command was to greatly expand the defenses of Washington. At all points of the compass, forts and entrenchments would be constructed in sufficient strength to defeat any attack. Alexandria, which contained the southern terminus of the Chesapeake and Ohio Canal and one of the largest ports in the Chesapeake Bay, was an object of "anxious study."

== Planning and construction ==
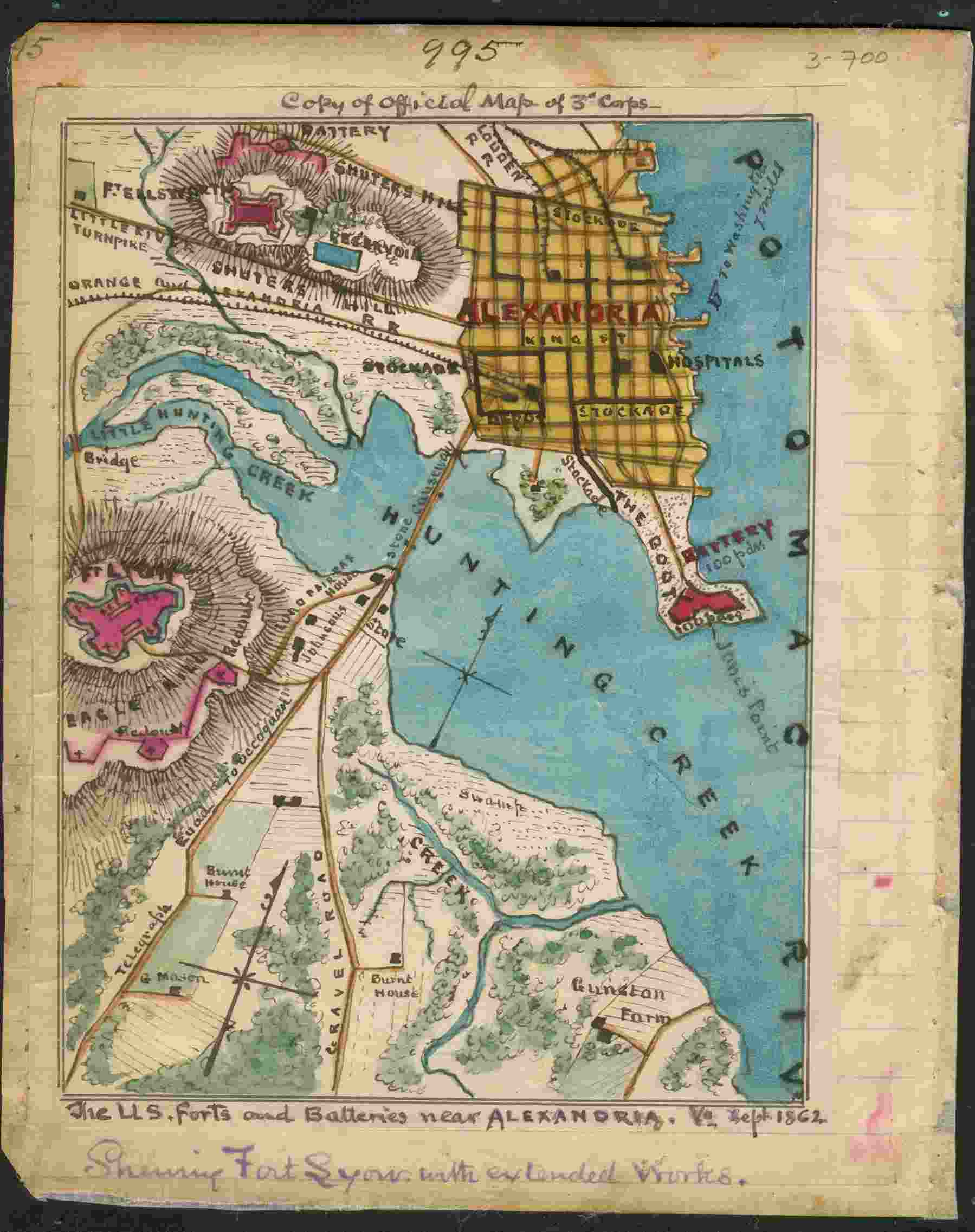
Fort Ellsworth map

In August 1861, General McClellan assigned General J.G. Barnard to take charge of construction to begin creation of a really complete system of defenses

Gen. Horatio Wright, oversaw the construction of Fort Ellsworth, and Gen. John Newton, who was in charge of the forts south of Four Mile Run, supervised the construction and managed the flow of men and material. The Fort was constructed on Shuter's Hill to the east of Samuel Cooper's Cameron plantation house.

Construction began on May 25, 1861. The perimeter was 618 yards, with room for 29 guns, including one 100-pound Parrott gun.

== Wartime use ==
On June 26, 1861, 30 – 10 Pounder Rifled Cannon were tested at Fort Ellsworth.

Col. J. Howard Kitching with the 6th New York Artillery occupied Fort Ellsworth:

Now we are in Fort Ellsworth...It is a very fine piece of work on a splendid commanding position, overlooking Washington, Alexandria, and all the surrounding country, for fifteen or twenty miles. When we came in here...it was occupied by four hundred 'man -of-war's men:' in fact, a complete frigate's crew – and they have been spending the past two months in putting the fort in order, just as sailors do, sodding and whitewashing everything, and planting evergreens, until the inside of the works is the very picture of neatness.

They moved on to Fort Worth, on Wednesday, November 27, 1861.

Fort Worth, Va., December 3, 1861.

My dearest L: I received your lovely letter, and would have answered it immediately, but that I was taken sick the day after I got it, and have been sick ever since. We received orders late Wednesday night to move our two companies which had been guarding Fort Ellsworth to Fort Worth, the next morning, Thanksgiving Day. So we were obliged to give up our comfortable quarters, and take up our line of march for an unfinished earthwork, on the outskirts of our line of fortifications; where instead of spending our time drilling on the guns, and teaching our men something useful, we are forced to take up our axes and shovels, and go to work upon the Fort.

In Ellsworth we had very nice quarters within the works, and everything convenient, and were able to crib a little time every day to ourselves.

In 1862, Nathaniel Hawthorne visited the Fort, as detailed the Atlantic:

We paid a visit to Fort Ellsworth, and from it[s] ramparts (which have been heaped up out of the muddy soil within the last few months, and will require still a year or two to make them verdant) we had a beautiful view of the Potomac, a truly majestic river, and the surrounding country. The fortifications, so numerous in all this region, and now so unsightly with their bare, precipitous sides will remain as historic monuments, grass-grown and picturesque memorials of an epoch of terror and suffering: they will serve to make our country dearer and more interesting to us, and afford fit soil for poetry to root itself in: for this is a plant which thrives best in spots where blood has been spilt long ago, and grows in abundant clusters in old ditches, such as the moat around Fort Ellsworth will be a century hence.

In September, 1864, Company F, 1st Wisconsin Heavy Artillery Regiment was assigned to the Fort.

The George Washington Masonic National Memorial was built on Shuter's hill, the site of the fort.
