= William T. Pugh =

American politician

William T. Pugh (October 31, 1845 – August 9, 1928) was an American politician and a deputy United States marshal.

Pugh was born in Wales. He immigrated to the United States, 1855, and settled in Cambria, Wisconsin. In 1864, he moved to Portage, Wisconsin. During the American Civil War, Pugh served in the 1st Wisconsin Heavy Artillery Regiment, Battery E. In 1872, he moved to Eau Claire, Wisconsin, and was a locomotive engineer. Pugh served in the Wisconsin Assembly in 1891 and 1892 as a Republican. From 1900 until his death, Pugh served as a United States marshal. Pugh died at his home in Cambria, Wisconsin, after a long illness.
