= Andover, Vermont =

- Town
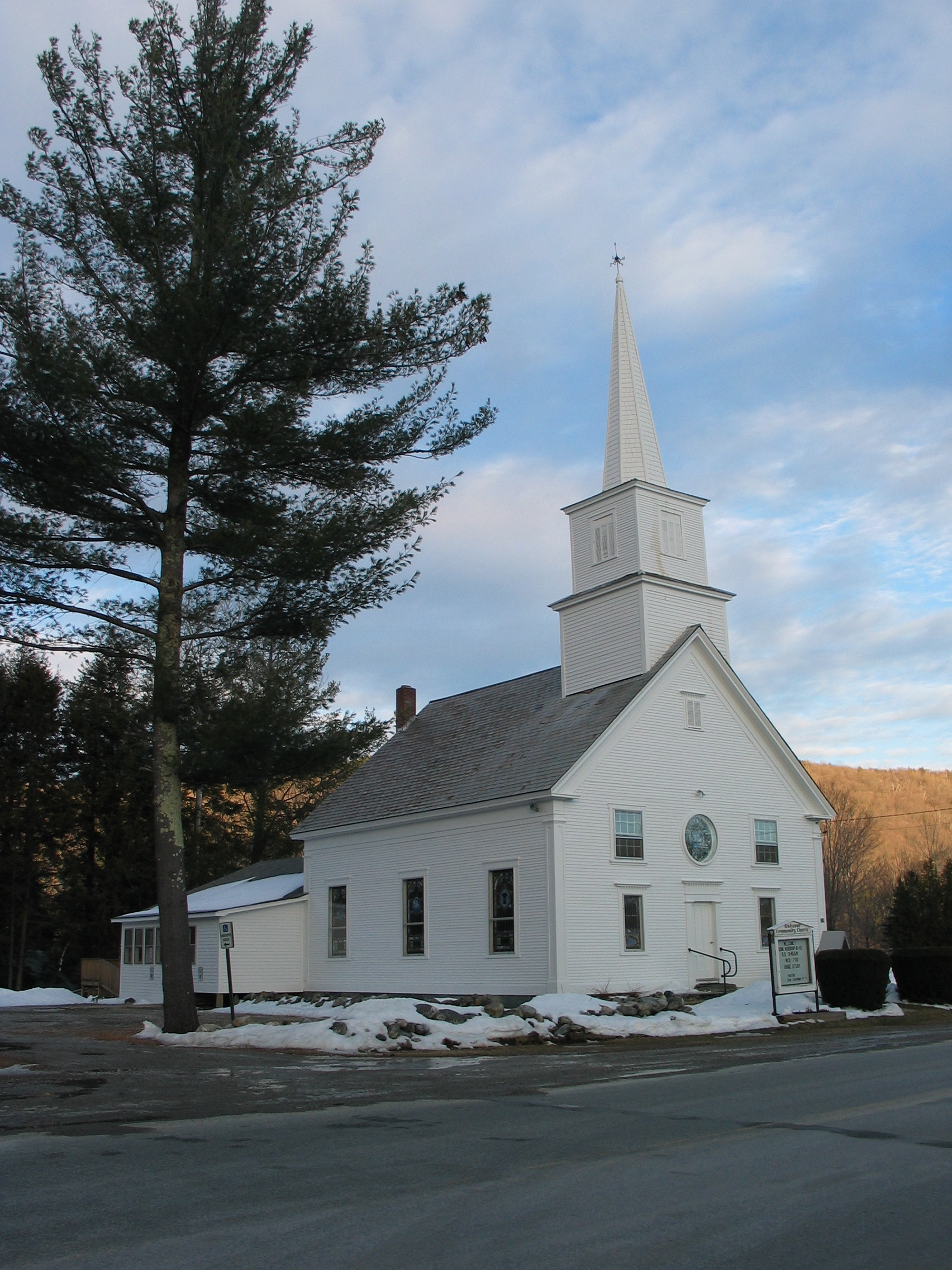
- Church in Andover

- Logo

- Location in Windsor County and the state of Vermont.
- Coordinates: 43°16′22″N 72°43′25″W
- Country: United States
- State: Vermont
- County: Windsor
- Communities: Andover; Middletown; Simonsville

Area
  - Total: 28.8 sq mi (74.5 km^{2})
  - Land: 28.6 sq mi (74.1 km^{2})
  - Water: 0.039 sq mi (0.1 km^{2})
- Elevation: 1,457 ft (444 m)

Population (2020)
  - Total: 568
  - Density: 19.9/sq mi (7.67/km^{2})
- Time zone: UTC-5 (Eastern (EST))
  - Summer (DST): UTC-4 (EDT)
- ZIP Codes: 05143 (Andover); 05149 (Ludlow)
- Area code: 802
- FIPS code: 50-01300
- GNIS feature ID: 1462026
- Website: www.andovervt.org

Andover is a town in Windsor County, Vermont, United States. The population was 568 at the 2020 census.

== Geography ==
According to the United States Census Bureau, the town has a total area of 28.8 square miles (74.5 km^{2}), of which 28.7 square miles (74.4 km^{2}) are land and 0.0 square miles (0.1 km^{2}), or 0.20%, is water.

== Demographics ==
Historical population
Census	Pop.	Note	%±
1790	275		—
1800	1,016		269.5%
1810	957		−5.8%
1820	1,000		4.5%
1830	975		−2.5%
1840	878		−9.9%
1850	725		−17.4%
1860	670		−7.6%
1870	588		−12.2%
1880	564		−4.1%
1890	418		−25.9%
1900	372		−11.0%
1910	284		−23.7%
1920	294		3.5%
1930	258		−12.2%
1940	213		−17.4%
1950	185		−13.1%
1960	215		16.2%
1970	239		11.2%
1980	350		46.4%
1990	373		6.6%
2000	496		33.0%
2010	467		−5.8%
2020	568		21.6%
U.S. Decennial Census

As of the census of 2000, there were 496 people, 215 households, and 147 families residing in the town. The population density was 17.2 people per square mile (6.7/km^{2}). There were 347 housing units at an average density of 12.1 per square mile (4.7/km^{2}). The racial makeup of the town was 98.39% White, 0.40% Native American, 0.40% Asian, 0.20% from other races, and 0.60% from two or more races. Hispanic or Latino of any race were 0.40% of the population.

There were 215 households, out of which 22.3% had children under the age of 18 living with them, 57.7% were married couples living together, 7.4% had a female householder with no husband present, and 31.6% were non-families. 22.8% of all households were made up of individuals, and 7.4% had someone living alone who was 65 years of age or older. The average household size was 2.31 and the average family size was 2.70.

In the town, the population was spread out, with 19.4% under the age of 18, 5.6% from 18 to 24, 25.4% from 25 to 44, 29.6% from 45 to 64, and 20.0% who were 65 years of age or older. The median age was 45 years. For every 100 women, there were 105.8 men. For every 100 women age 18 and over, there were 112.8 men.

The median income for a household in the town was $42,273, and the median income for a family was $50,625. Men had a median income of $26,719 versus $25,658 for women. The per capita income for the town was $21,744. About 4.5% of families and 8.0% of the population were below the poverty line, including 9.7% of those under age 18 and 8.2% of those age 65 or over.

== Notable people ==
- Alvin Adams (1804–1877), founded one of the first companies for express shipments by rail in the US
- Austin Adams (1826–1890), lawyer and justice of the Iowa Supreme Court
- Claudio Arrau (1903–1991), classical pianist
- Albert Gutterson (1887–1965), Olympic athlete, born in Andover
- Ira S. Haseltine (1821–1899), U.S. Congressman from Missouri
- George Washington Putnam (1826–1899), member of the Wisconsin State Assembly
