= 125th New York Infantry Regiment =

- New York flag
- Active: 29 August 1862 to 5 June 1865
- Country: United States
- Allegiance: Union
- Branch: Infantry
- Engagements: Battle of Harper's Ferry; Battle of Gettysburg; Battle of Bristoe Station; Battle of Wilderness; Battle of Spotsylvania Court House; Battle of Gettysburg; Battle of North Anna; Battle of Totopotomoy Creek; Battle of Cold Harbor; Second Battle of Petersburg; Battle of Weldon Railroad; Second Battle of Ream's Station; First Battle of Deep Bottom; Second Battle of Deep Bottom; Battle of Hatcher's Run; Battle of Sutherland's Station; Appomattox Campaign

Commanders
- Colonel: John A. Griswold
- Colonel: George L. Willard
- Colonel: Levin Crandall

The 125th New York Infantry Regiment was a volunteer regiment from Rensselaer County, New York, during the American Civil War. Formed during the summer of 1862, the unit was officially mustered into United States Service on 27–29 August 1862, by Col. George L. Willard. He had seen previous service in the Mexican War as well. Levin Crandall was commissioned lieutenant colonel, and James C. Bush major. The unit was mustered out on 5 June 1865.

== Regimental history ==
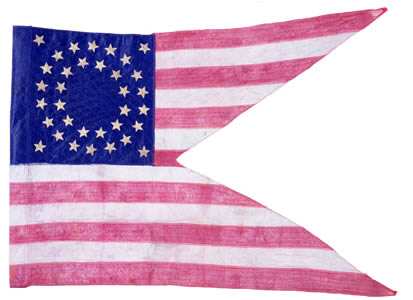
Guidon of the 125th New York Volunteers carried at Gettysburg, Pennsylvania. Flags like this silk swallowtail standard were used as markers on the battlefield to assist with maneuvers. The flag displays 34 gold-painted stars in the canton. It matches the stars and stripes pattern described in General Order No. 4, Headquarters of the U.S. Army, dated 18 January 1862. According to Colonel Levin Crandall, Private William F. Mullin carried this flag during the battle of Gettysburg where enemy fire reportedly pierced the flag and shattered the staff.

Colonel John A. Griswold was authorized, 28 July 1862, to raise this regiment in Rensselaer county; on his resignation, Col. George L. Willard succeeded him 15 August 1862; the regiment was organized at Troy and there mustered in the service of the United States for three years 27–29 August 1862. The men not entitled to be mustered out with the regiment were on 5 June 1865, transferred to the 4th Artillery.

The regiment left Troy, 30 August 1862, and proceeded by rail to Martinsburg, Virginia, and a few days later it marched to and was engaged in the Battle of Harpers Ferry. A few of its number were killed and wounded during this battle, and the regiment together with the rest of the garrison, totaling over 11,500 men, surrendered to the Confederates on 15 September 1862.

With the other captured troops, the men were sent under parole to Camp Douglas, Chicago, to remain there while awaiting exchange, which was effected 22 November. The regiment was then ordered back to Virginia, where it was attached to Maj. Gen. Silas Casey's Division, in the defenses of Washington at Maryland Heights, and encamped at Centreville until 24 June 1863, when it joined the Second Corps, Army of the Potomac, and marched away to Gettysburg. Gen. Alexander Hays, who commanded the brigade while at Centreville, was placed in command of the division, and Colonel George L. Willard took over command of the brigade, which was composed of four New York regiments — the 39th, 111th, 125th, and 126th.

Under command of Colonel Crandall, the 125th fought at Gettysburg where it lost 139 killed and wounded. Colonel Willard was killed while in command of the brigade, and Crandall was promoted colonel. Maj. A. B. Myer was made lieutenant colonel, and Capt. S. C. Armstrong, major.

The regiment was actively engaged at Auburn and Bristoe Station in October, losing 36 men in those battles. Capt. William H. Plumb was mortally wounded at Bristoe Station.

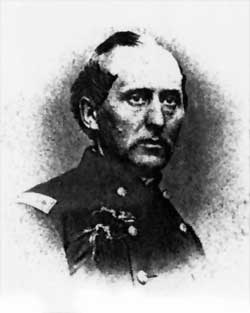
Col. Levin Crandall, commanding officer of the 125th New York Volunteers

Colonel Crandall was temporarily absent on recruiting service, and Lieut. Col. Aaron B. Myer was in command at the battle of the Wilderness. He was mortally wounded in this engagement, and the command devolved on Capt. George E. Lemon. Color Sergt. Harrison Clark carried his flag within ten feet of the enemy's line, where he fell with his leg shattered by a rifle ball. Colonel Myer, who at that time had not yet fallen, assisted in binding Clark's wound and promoted him to a lieutenancy on the field. As Clark fell the flag was seized by Philip Brady, of Company I, but he was soon killed while waving the colors in advance of the men.

A few days later, at Spotsylvania, the regiment was in the thick of the fight, forming part of a storming column that moved against the enemy's works at daybreak on 12 May 1864. Capt. E. P. Jones, commanding the regiment, was killed in this assault, and Lieutenants Clapp and Cleminshaw were mortally wounded. Michael Burke of Company D captured an enemy's battle flag, but was shot down in the act, falling with a bullet through his breast. In the two battles of the Wilderness and Spotsylvania, the 125th lost 118 in killed and wounded.

On 26 May, Colonel Crandall returned from recruiting service and resumed command. The regiment was engaged at the Battle of North Anna, Battle of Totopotomoy Creek, and the Battle of Cold Harbor, with further losses in officers and men. Lieutenant Green was mortally wounded in the fight of 30 May at Totopotomoy.

In the Second Battle of Petersburg on 16 June, the decimated ranks were thinned again. Forty-four men were casualties, one-third of whom were killed in action. Another color sergeant, A. B. Green, was killed during the battle. Colonel Crandall was wounded by a piece of shell that struck him in the face. Lieutenants Bryan and Coleman were fatally wounded.

In the battle at the Weldon Railroad on 22 June, the regiment lost several men who were captured by the enemy, while three more officers—Adjutant Miller, and Lieutenants Hull and Barnes—died during a disastrous and badly led battle.

In addition to the minor battles of Reams' Station, First and Second Battle of Deep Bottom, Strawberry Plains, and Hatcher's Run, the regiment was daily engaged during the siege of Petersburg—from 16 July 1864, to 1 April 1865—on the picket line and in the trenches with frequent and continuous losses of men from wounds or by sickness caused by constant exposure. After the battle at Reams' Station, Capt. Nelson Penfield was placed in command, the colonel having been placed previously in charge of the brigade.

Colonel Crandall resigned 14 December 1864, after a distinguished and honorable term of service. He was succeeded by Lieut. Col. Joseph Hyde, who had entered the regiment originally as a lieutenant in Company H.

On 29 March 1865, the men broke camp and, crossing Hatcher's Run, entered on their last campaign. The regiment was still in the Third Brigade (Henry J. Madill 's), First Division (Miles's), Second Corps (Humphreys'). On April 2d, the regiment took part in the charge of Miles's Division on the Confederate works at Sutherland's Station, a bloody affair in which Capt. John Quay was killed. The brigade suffered severely in this attack, Colonel Madill being badly wounded. In the subsequent battles of the Second Corps prior to Lee's surrender at Appomattox, the regiment was present but suffered only a slight loss.

After marching in the Grand Review at Washington it proceeded to Troy, N. Y., where the men received their final payment and were mustered out on 15 June 1865.

== Organization ==
Volunteers were recruited by town and the 11 companies of the regiment were organized by region:

- A Company: Hoosick Falls
- B Company: Troy
- C Company: Lansingburg, Troy, Sand Lake, Pittstown and Schaghticoke
- D Company: Troy
- E Company: Sand Lake, Stephentown, Nassau, and Hoag's Corner
- F Company: Troy and Poestenkill
- G Company: Troy and New York City
- H Company: Troy
- I Company: Troy and New York City
- K Company: Schaghticoke and Troy

== Campaigns ==
During the term of the unit's service in the Civil War, the 125th New York Volunteers saw the following service:

- Battle of Harper's Ferry, West Virginia, 12–15 September 1862
  - Maryland Heights 12–13 September.
  - Bolivar Heights 14–15 September.
  - Surrendered 15 September.
  - Paroled 16 September and sent to Annapolis, Md., thence to Camp Douglas, Chicago, Illinois, and duty there guarding prisoners until November, 1862.
  - Declared exchanged 22 November 1862.
- Moved to Washington, D.C., 23–25 November.
  - Camp at Arlington Heights, Virginia, until 3 December, and at Centreville, Virginia, until June, 1863.
  - Ordered to join Army of the Potomac in the field and Joined 2nd Army Corps 25 June 1863.
- Battle of Gettysburg, Pennsylvania, 2–4 July
  - Pursuit of Lee to Manassas Gap, Virginia, 5–24 July.
  - Duty on lines of the Rappahannock and Rapidan until October.
  - Advance from the Rappahannock to the Rapidan 13–17 September.
- Battle of Bristoe Station, 9–22 October
  - Auburn and Bristoe 14 October.
  - Advance to line of the Rappahannock 7–8 November.
  - Mine Run Campaign 26 November-2 December.
  - Duty near Brandy Station until May, 1864.
  - Demonstration on the Rapidan 6–7 February.
  - Campaign from the Rapidan to the James 3 May-15 June.
- Battle of Wilderness, 5–7 May
  - Spottsylvania 8–12 May
  - Po River 10 May
- Battle of Spotsylvania Court House, 12–21 May
  - Assault on the Salient "Bloody Angle" 12 May.
- Battle of North Anna
- Battle of Totopotomoy Creek
- Battle of Cold Harbor
  - Jerusalem Road
- Second Battle of Petersburg
- Battle of Weldon Railroad
- Second Battle of Ream's Station
- First Battle of Deep Bottom
- Second Battle of Deep Bottom
- Strawberry Plains
- Battle of Hatcher's Run
  - White Oak Road
- Battle of Sutherland's Station
  - Fall of Petersburg
  - Sailor's Creek
  - Farmville
- Appomattox Campaign

== Casualties ==
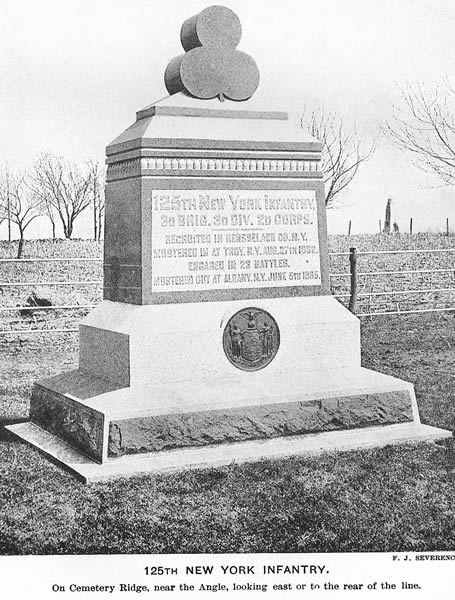
Monument to the 125th New York Volunteer Infantry Regiment at Gettysburg, Pennsylvania. The cloverleaf on top of the monument was the insignia of II Corps, 3rd Division.

During its various campaigns and battles the 125th New York sustained a loss of 15 officers and 112 enlisted men, killed or mortally wounded; 1 officer and 112 enlisted men who died of disease, accidents, or in Confederate prisons; total deaths, 240, out of a total enrollment of 1,248. Of the 113 who died of disease, 58 died in the hands of the enemy. The total of killed and wounded in all its battles amounted to 464.

During its service the regiment lost by death, killed in action, 7 officers, 70 enlisted men; of wounds received in action, 8 officers, 42 enlisted men; of disease and other causes, 1 officer, 115 enlisted men; total, 16 officers, 227 enlisted men; aggregate, 243; of whom 3 officers, 61 enlisted men died in the hands of the enemy.

== Medal of Honor recipients ==
=== Michael Burke ===
Burke was born in Ireland and like many immigrants joined the army. He enlisted at Troy, Rensselaer County, NY. A Private in Company D, 125th New York Infantry, at Battle of Spotsylvania Court House on 12 May 1864, he captured the enemy's flag while advancing over the enemy's works at Spotsylvania, Virginia, and sustained a bullet wound to the chest. His Medal of Honor was issued on 1 December 1864.

=== Harrison Clark ===
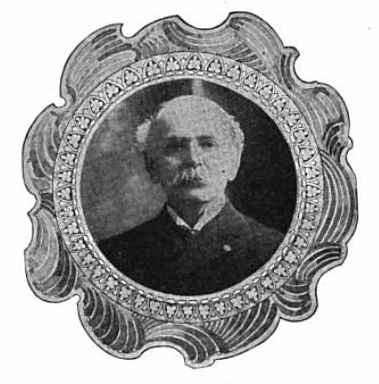
Corporal Harrison Clark, Medal of Honor recipient

Harrison Clark, born 10 April 1842 at Chatham, New York, entered Federal service in the US Army at Chatham. He earned The Medal of Honor during the Civil War for heroism on 2 July 1863 at Gettysburg, Pennsylvania.

CARRIED THE COLORS OF HIS WOUNDED COMRADE

It was about seven o'clock in the evening of 2 July 1863," Corporal Harrison Clark writes, " as we moved down into the fight, the sun was sinking low in the west and the heavens were ablaze with its splendor, in marked contrast with the lurid fires of death towards which we were marching. We were halted amid a heavy cloud of smoke in front of a swale and a new growth of trees. Through the smoke covering the field we could dimly see the outlines of men moving about. We commenced to fire, but the word was shouted: 'firing on your own men,' and the command was given to 'cease firing.' We soon learned our mistake.

The color-bearer at my right fell, mortally wounded, and before the old flag could touch the ground, I caught it, and on we rushed with loud cries; on, with bullets whizzing by our ears, shells screaming and cannon balls tearing the air, now bursting above and around us, laying many of our comrades either low in death, or bleeding with terrible wounds. Most of our color guard were killed or wounded.

The purpose was accomplished. The enemy had failed to break through our lines, and Little Round Top and Cemetery Hill were still ours. On the return march, as we were passing the swale, where over one hundred of our brave men had fallen in the space of half an hour, the regiment was again formed in line of battle, the colonel ordered me to step three paces in front of the regiment, promoted me color-bearer and, by his recommendation to Congress, I was awarded a Medal of Honor.

"At the battle of the Wilderness, Color-Sergeant Clark displayed rare bravery and continued fighting, though shot in the leg. He was promoted lieutenant on the battlefield."

He died 18 April 1913 at the age of 71.

== See also ==
- Historical reenactment
- List of New York Civil War regiments
