= 1st Air Defense Artillery Regiment =

1st Air Defense Artillery
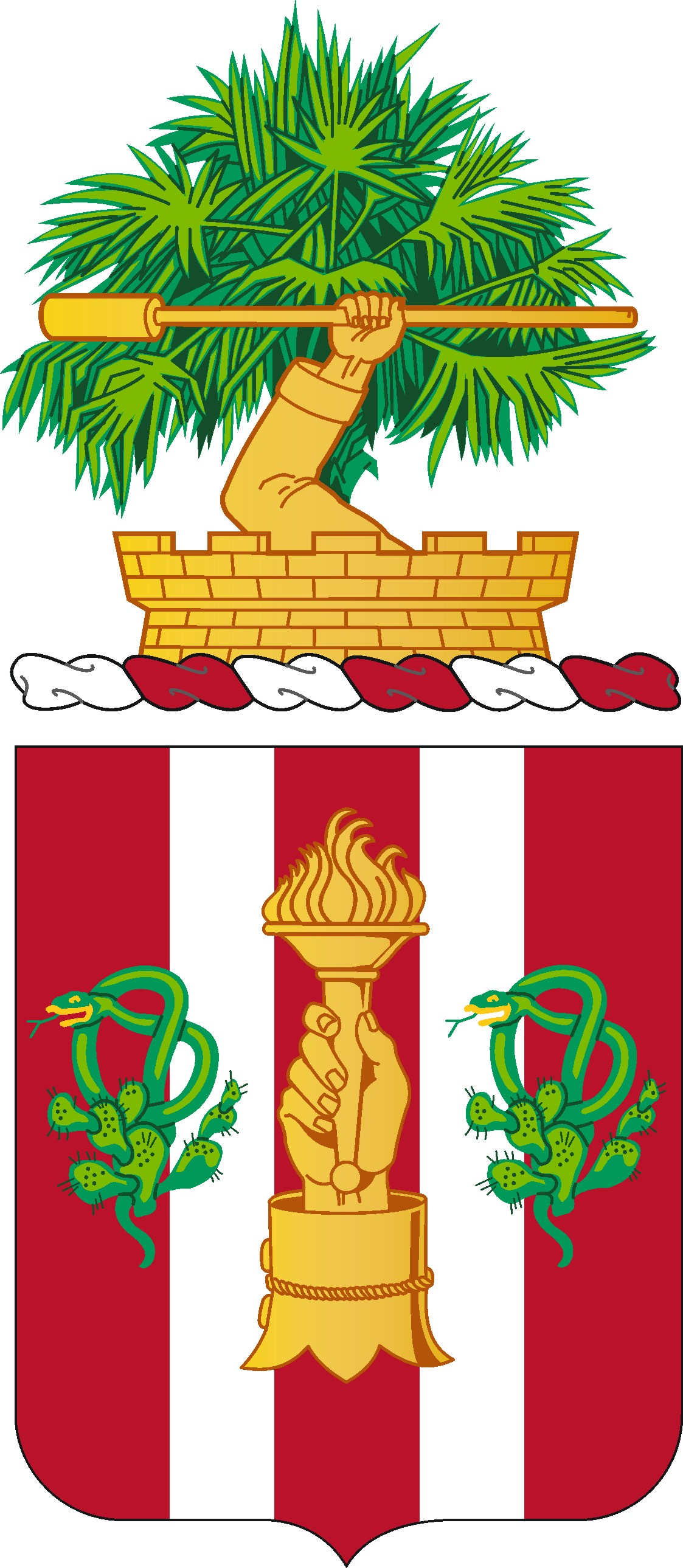
- Coat of arms
- Active: 1821; 205 years ago
- Country: United States
- Branch: Army
- Type: Air Defense Artillery
- Garrison/HQ: Kadena Air Force Base; Camp Carroll, South Korea
- Motto: "Primus Inter Pares" (First among equals)
- Mascot: Oozlefinch
- Engagements: Battle of Fort Sumter; War of 1812; Indian Wars; Mexican War; U.S. Civil War; World War II; Southwest Asia; Operation Iraqi Freedom

Insignia
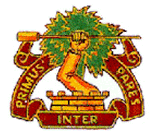
- Distinctive unit insignia

The 1st Air Defense Artillery is an air defense artillery regiment in the United States Army first formed as a field artillery unit in 1821.

== Lineage ==
Constituted 1 June 1821 in the Regular Army as the 1st Regiment of Artillery, and organized from existing units with headquarters at Fort Independence (Massachusetts). The lineages of some of the units that initially made up the 1st U.S. Artillery include campaign credit for the War of 1812.

Twelve batteries of the regiment served in the American Civil War. Battery E and Battery H were the garrison of Fort Sumter under Major Robert Anderson during the bombardment of the fort in April 1861.

Battery E of the 1st Artillery participated in the Battle of Wounded Knee on 29 December 1890.

Order of battle information shows that batteries of the regiment deployed outside the U.S. in the Spanish–American War of 1898. However, no battle honors for this war are on the official lineage and honors certificate dated 29 November 1996. Batteries E and K deployed to Cuba.

Regiment broken up 13 February 1901 and its elements reorganized and redesignated as separate numbered companies and batteries of the Artillery Corps.

Reconstituted 1 July 1924 in the Regular Army as the 1st Coast Artillery and partially organized with headquarters at Fort De Lesseps, Panama Canal Zone in the Harbor Defenses of Cristobal on the Caribbean side of the Panama Canal. The regiment was organized by redesignating the 2nd, 3rd, 4th, 7th, 8th, 10th, and 11th companies of the Coast Artillery Corps (CAC). Batteries B, C, and D carried the lineage and designations of the corresponding batteries in the old 1st Artillery.

On 1 July 1924, Headquarters and Headquarters Battery (HHB) & Band activated at Fort De Lesseps and 3rd Battalion with Batteries E and G at Fort Randolph. Batteries A, B, C, D, & F were inactive.

Battery G inactivated 31 May 1926; 1st Battalion activated 1 June 1926 at Fort Randolph, Canal Zone; inactivated 31 July 1926 at Fort Randolph, Canal Zone.

Batteries A, B, C, D, F, & H activated 17 March 1932 (or 15 April 1932) with personnel from 2nd Coast Artillery (Harbor Defense) (HD) and 65th Coast Artillery (Antiaircraft) (AA). 1st and 2nd Battalions activated 15 April 1932 at Forts Randolph and Sherman, Canal Zone, respectively. 3rd Battalion inactivated same date. 1st Battalion served as AA and 2nd Battalion as HD under special tables of organization. HHB changed station to Fort Sherman 15 February 1940.

Battery G activated 1 November 1938 at Fort Sherman.

Regiment reorganized as HD 26 October 1939. 1st Battalion provided cadre for organization of 72nd Coast Artillery (AA) Regiment at Fort Randolph 1 November 1939.

3d Battalion activated 15 March 1940 at Fort Randolph, Canal Zone.

1st and 2nd Battalions and Batteries E and F inactivated 30 March 1941; 1st and 2nd Battalions activated 17 April 1942 at Fort Sherman, Canal Zone.

Regiment broken up 1 November 1944 and its elements reorganized and redesignated as follows:

Headquarters and Headquarters Battery as Headquarters and Headquarters Battery, 1st Coast Artillery Group.

Remainder of regiment as the 1st Coast Artillery Battalion.

After 1 November 1944 the above units underwent changes as follows:

Headquarters and Headquarters Battery, 1st Coast Artillery Group, reorganized and redesignated 2 January 1945 as Headquarters and Headquarters Battery, Harbor Defenses of Cristobal. Inactivated 15 January 1947 at Fort Sherman, Canal Zone. Redesignated 21 June 1950 as Headquarters and Headquarters Battery, 1st Antiaircraft Artillery Group. Consolidated 18 November 1952 with Headquarters and Headquarters Battery, 1st Antiaircraft Artillery Group (see ANNEX), and consolidated unit designated as Headquarters and Headquarters Battery, 1st Antiaircraft Artillery Group. Activated 15 April 1953 in Germany. Inactivated 26 December 1957 in Germany.

1st Coast Artillery Battalion disbanded 1 February 1946 at Fort Sherman, Canal Zone. Reconstituted 21 June 1950 in the Regular Army as the 1st Coast Artillery to consist of the 1st and 2nd Battalions; 1st and 2nd Battalions concurrently redesignated as the 1st and 54th Antiaircraft Battalions, respectively.

1st Antiaircraft Battalion redesignated 17 March 1955 as the 1st Antiaircraft Artillery Missile Battalion Activated 15 April 1955 at Irwin, Pennsylvania. Inactivated 1 September 1958 at Irwin, Pennsylvania.

54th Antiaircraft Battalion redesignated 15 December 1954 as the 54th Antiaircraft Artillery Missile Battalion and activated at the United States Army Chemical Center, Maryland. Inactivated 1 September 1958 at the United States Army Chemical Center, Maryland.

Headquarters and Headquarters Battery, 1st Antiaircraft Artillery Group, and the 1st and 54th Antiaircraft Artillery Missile Battalions consolidated 19 March 1959 with the 1st Field Artillery Battalion (organized in 1907) and consolidated unit reorganized and redesignated as the 1st Artillery, a parent regiment under the Combat Arms Regimental System.

1st Artillery (less former 1st Field Artillery Battalion) reorganized and redesignated 1 September 1971 as the 1st Air Defense Artillery, a parent regiment under the Combat Arms Regimental System (former 1st Field Artillery Battalion concurrently reorganized and redesignated as the 1st Field Artillery - hereafter separate lineage).

1st Air Defense Artillery withdrawn 16 June 1987 from the Combat Arms Regimental System and reorganized under the United States Army Regimental System.

=== Annex (1st AAA Group) ===
Constituted 5 August 1942 in the Army of the United States as Headquarters and Headquarters Battery, 1st Antiaircraft Artillery Automatic Weapons Group (or 1st Coast Artillery Group (Antiaircraft)).

Activated 17 August 1942 at Fort Bliss, Texas. Departed the United States 1 March 1943; arrived in North Africa 9 March 1943 and landed in Sicily on 9 August 1943. Transferred to Sardinia 4 December 1943.

Redesignated 31 December 1943 as Headquarters and Headquarters Battery, 1st Antiaircraft Artillery Group at Sassari, Sardinia. Moved to Corsica 25 July 1944; landed in France 2 November 1944.

Disbanded 13 February 1945 at Marseille, France.

Reconstituted 18 February 1952 in the Regular Army.

== Campaign participation credit ==
War of 1812

- Canada

Indian Wars

- Seminoles
- Texas 1859

Mexican War

- Palo Alto
- Resaca de la Palma
- Monterey
- Vera Cruz
- Cerro Gordo
- Contreras
- Churubusco
- Chapultepec
- Tamaulipas 1846
- Vera Cruz 1847
- Mexico 1847

Civil War

- Sumter
- Bull Run
- Mississippi River
- Peninsula
- Manassas
- Antietam
- Fredericksburg
- Chancellorsville
- Gettysburg
- Wilderness
- Spotsylvania
- Cold Harbor
- Petersburg
- Shenandoah
- Appomattox
- Florida 1861
- Florida 1862
- Florida 1864
- South Carolina 1862
- South Carolina 1863
- Virginia 1863
- Virginia 1864
- West Virginia 1863
- Louisiana 1864

World War II

- American Theater, Streamer without inscription
- Tunisia
- Sicily
- Rome-Arno
- Rhineland

Southwest Asia

- Defense of Saudi Arabia
- Liberation and Defense of Kuwait
- Cease-Fire
- Operation Iraqi Freedom 2003

== Decorations ==
The 1st Air Defense Artillery has received the following decorations:

- Army Superior Unit Award for 1984–1985
- Valorous Unit Award for SAUDI ARABIA AND BAHRAIN

== Active components ==
- 1st Battalion, 1st Air Defense Artillery Regiment
- 2nd Battalion, 1st Air Defense Artillery Regiment

== Coat of arms ==
- Shield

Gules, two pallets argent, overall a cubit arm habited in the artillery uniform of 1861 erased holding aloft a burning torch or, between two of a snake vert, lipped and eyed of the third above and behind a prickly pear cactus all proper, fesswise.

- Crest

On a wreath of the colors, argent and gules, a palmetto tree vert behind an arm embowed habited in the artillery uniform of 1861 issuing from the upper portion of an embattled tower and grasping a rammer staff fessways all or.

- Motto

Primus Inter Pares (First Among Equals).

=== Symbolism ===
- Shield

The shield is scarlet for artillery. With two white stripes, alluding to the campaign streamer of the War of 1812, the age of some of the units of the regiment is depicted. The snake and cactus, from the State Seal of Mexico, represent the Mexican War. The hand holding the torch of loyalty commemorates the defense of Fort Pickens, the only fort south of Fort Monroe that remained loyal to the federal government throughout the Civil War.

- Crest

The arm and rammer staff rising out of a tower in front of a palmetto tree indicate participation in the Civil War at Fort Sumter. The palmetto tree is taken from the State Seal of South Carolina.

== Distinctive unit insignia ==
The distinctive insignia is an adaptation of the crest and motto of the coat of arms.

== See also ==
- 1st U.S. Artillery, Battery E
- 1st U.S. Artillery, Battery G
- 1st U.S. Artillery, Battery I
- 1st U.S. Artillery, Battery K
- List of United States Regular Army Civil War units
- Field Artillery Branch (United States)
- Air Defense Artillery Branch (United States)
- U.S. Army Coast Artillery Corps
