= 111th New York Infantry Regiment =

- Active: August 20, 1862, to June 4, 1865
- Country: United States
- Allegiance: Union
- Branch: Infantry
- Part of: II Corps, Army of the Potomac
- Campaigns: Gettysburg campaign Bristoe Campaign; Mine Run Campaign; Overland Campaign; Appomattox Campaign

Commanders
- Aug 20, 1862 to Jan 3, 1863: Colonel Jesse Segoine
- Jan 3, 1863 to Jun 3, 1865: Colonel Clinton D. MacDougall
- Jul 3, 1863: Lieutenant Colonel Isaac M. Lusk
- Jul 3, 1863: Captain Aaron P. Seeley

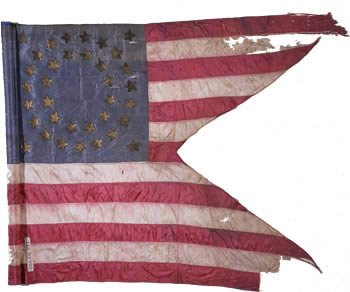
111th New York Infantry Regiment Guidon

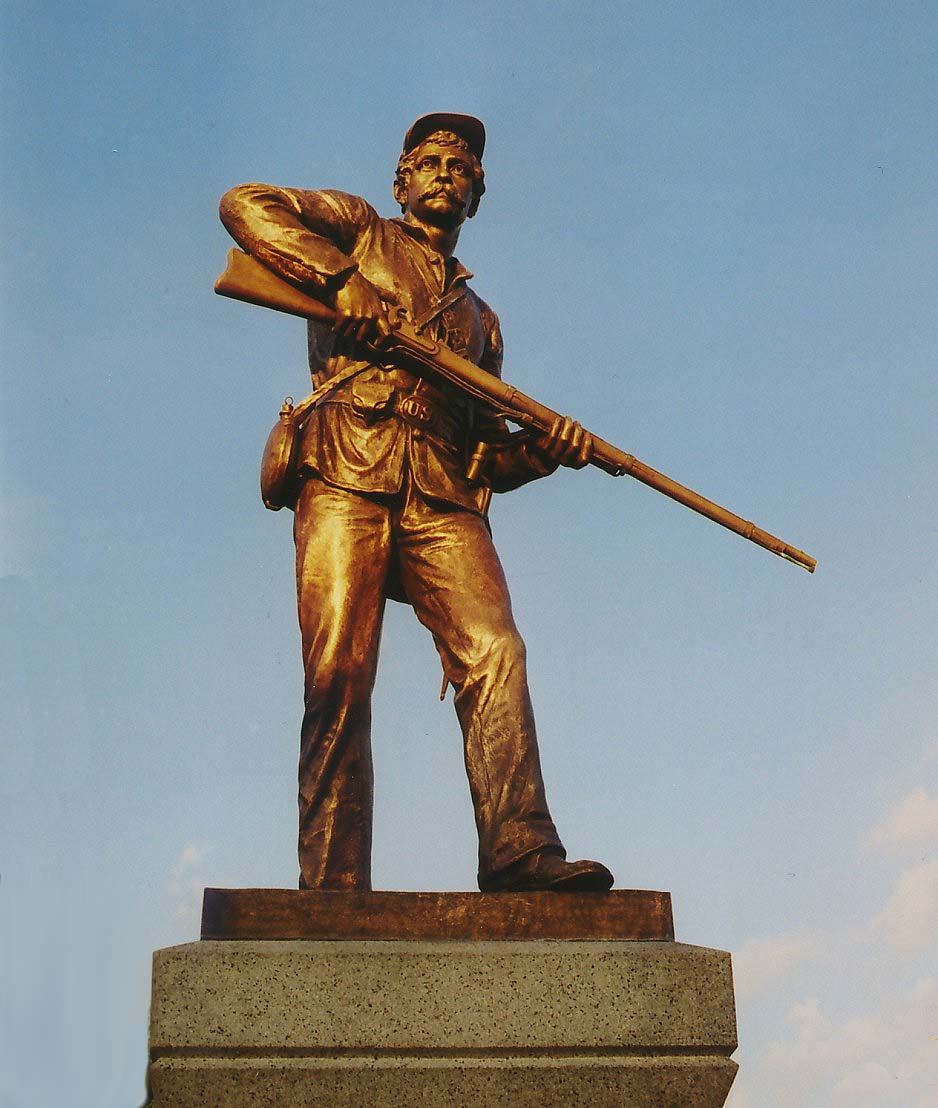
The monument to the 111th New York Volunteers at Gettysburg

The 111th New York Infantry Regiment was organized at Auburn, New York, to answer the call by Abraham Lincoln for 300,000 more troops to fight in the American Civil War. Over the next three years, this regiment lost the fifth greatest number of men among all New York regiments.

== History ==
Jesse Segoine was authorized on July 18, 1862, to begin recruiting a regiment of men within the Cayuga and Wayne Counties, New York. As Segoine was able to raise the men, he received a commission of Colonel and commander of this, the 111th New York Infantry Regiment. The regiment was raised in almost a month's time, and mustered into service in Auburn, New York, on August 20, 1862.

=== Regimental organization ===
Company A – Principally recruited from Wayne County.

Company B – Principally recruited from Wayne County.

Company C – Principally recruited from Wayne County.

Company D – Principally recruited from Wayne County.

Company E – Principally recruited from Wayne County.

Company F – Principally recruited from Cayuga County

Company G – Principally recruited from Cayuga County.

Company H – Principally recruited from Cayuga County.

Company I – Principally recruited from Cayuga County.

Company K – Principally recruited from Cayuga County.

=== Time line ===
| Date | Battle or Event |
|---|---|
| July 18, 1862 | Organized at Auburn, N.Y. |
| August 20, 1862 | Mustered in under Colonel Jesse Segoine, Lieutenant Colonel Clinton McDougall, and Major Senaca B. Smith |
| August 21, 1862 | Left State for Harper's Ferry. Attached to Miles' Command, Harper's Ferry. |
| September 12–15, 1862 | Defense of Harper's Ferry |
| September 15, 1862 | Regiment was surrendered with garrison |
| September 16, 1862 | Paroled and sent to Annapolis, Maryland, then to Camp Douglas, Chicago, Illinois |
| November 23, 1862 | Exchanged; duty at Camp Douglas guarding prisoners |
| December, 1862 | Ordered to Washington, D.C., and duty in the defenses of that city and at Centreville, Va. assigned to Wadsworth's Command, Military District of Washington |
| February, 1863 | Attached to 3rd Brigade, Casey's Division, 22nd Army Corps, Department of Washington |
| April, 1863 | Attached to 3rd Brigade, Abercrombie's Division, 22nd Army Corps |
| June 25, 1863 | Ordered to join Army of the Potomac in the field. Assigned to 3rd Brigade, 3rd Division, 2nd Army Corps, Army of the Potomac |

Gettysburg Campaign – June 25 – July 24, 1863

Two companies were left on guard at Accotink bridge, the remaining eight, numbering 390 men, joined the Second Corps on the march to Gettysburg.

| July 2–4, 1863 | Battle of Gettysburg |
| | The regiment was commanded by Colonel Clinton D. MacDougall until he was wounded on July 3. Lieutenant Colonel Isaac M. Lusk took command until he, too was wounded, when Caption Aaron P. Seeley took over the regiment. |
| | From the monument: "Arrived early morning July 2nd 1863, position near Ziegler's Grove. Went to relief of 3rd Corps in afternoon; took this position that evening and held it to close of battle. Number engaged (8 companies) 390 Casualties Killed 58, wounded 177, missing 14, total 249" |
| July 5–24, 1863 | Pursuit of Lee to Manassas Gap, Va. |
| August, 1863 | Duty on line of the Rappahannock and Rapidan |
| September 13–17, 1863 | Advance from the Rappahannock to the Rapidan |
| October 3, 1863 | Lewinsville |

Bristoe Campaign – October 9–22, 1863

| October 14, 1863 | Auburn and Bristoe |
| October 15, 1863 | Blackburn's and Mitchell's Fords |
| November 7–8, 1863 | Advance to line of the Rappahannock |

Mine Run Campaign – November 26 – December 2, 1863

| December, 1863 | At and near Stevensburg, Va. |
| February 6–7, 1864 | Demonstration on the Rapidan; Morton's Ford |
| March, 1864 | Attached to 3rd Brigade, 1st Division, 2nd Army Corps |

Campaign from the Rapidan to the James – May 3 – June 15, 1864

| May 5–7, 1864 | Battle of the Wilderness |
| | The regiment lost 42 killed, 119 wounded and 17 missing, over half its strength. |
| May 8–12, 1864 | Spottsylvania |
| | The regiment lost 22 killed, 37 wounded, and 13 missing |
| May 10, 1864 | Po River |
| May 12–21, 1864 | Spottsylvania Court House |
| May 12, 1864 | Assault on the Salient, or "Bloody Angle" |
| May 23–26, 1864 | North Anna River |
| May 26–28, 1864 | On line of the Pamunkey |
| May 28–31, 1864 | Totopotomoy |
| June 1–12, 1864 | Cold Harbor |
| June 16–18, 1864 | Before Petersburg |
| June 16, 1864 | Siege of Petersburg begins. |
| | Attached to Consolidated Brigade, 1st Division, 2nd Army Corps. |
| June 22–23, 1864 | Jerusalem Plank Road, Weldon Railroad |
| July 27–29, 1864 | Demonstration north of the James |
| July 27–28, 1864 | Deep Bottom |
| August 13–20, 1864 | Demonstration north of the James |
| August 14–18, 1864 | Strawberry Plains, Deep Bottom |
| August 25, 1864 | Ream's Station |
| November, 1864 | Attached to 3rd Brigade, 1st Division, 2nd Army Corps |
| December 9–10, 1864 | Reconnaissance to Hatcher's Run |
| February 5–7. 1865 | Dabney's Mills, Hatcher's Run |
| March 25. 1865 | Watkins' House |

Appomattox Campaign – March 28 – April 9. 1865

The regiment lost 81 casualties in the last campaign of the war

| March 29–30. 1865 | On line of Hatcher's and Gravelly Runs |
| March 31. 1865 | Hatcher's Run or Boydton Road and White Oak Road |
| April 2. 1865 | Sutherland Station and fall of Petersburg |
| April 3–9 | Pursuit of Lee |
| April 6. 1865 | Sailor's Creek |
| April 7. 1865 | High Bridge and Farmville |
| April 9. 1865 | Appomattox Court House. Surrender of Lee and his army. |
| April 1865 | At Burkesville |
| May 2–12. 1865 | Moved to Washington, D.C. |
| May 23. 1865 | Grand Review |
| June 3. 1865 | Mustered out under Lieutenant Colonel Lewis W. Husk. Veterans and recruits transferred to 4th New York Heavy Artillery. |

=== Regiment losses ===
Over the 111th Regiment's time in service, total enrollment was 1,780 soldiers. Ten officers and 210 men were killed and mortally wounded in battle. The total of 220 men who were killed and died of wounds is only exceeded by four other New York regiments — the 69th, 40th, 48th and 121st. In the entire Union Army, that number is only exceeded by 24 other regiments. Disease and other causes took another 2 officers and 177 enlisted men. This raises the total sacrificed to reunite this nation to 404. Two officers and 74 men died while in the confinement of Confederate prisons.

== See also ==
- List of New York Civil War regiments
- New York in the American Civil War
