= William Neil Dennison =

American lawyer

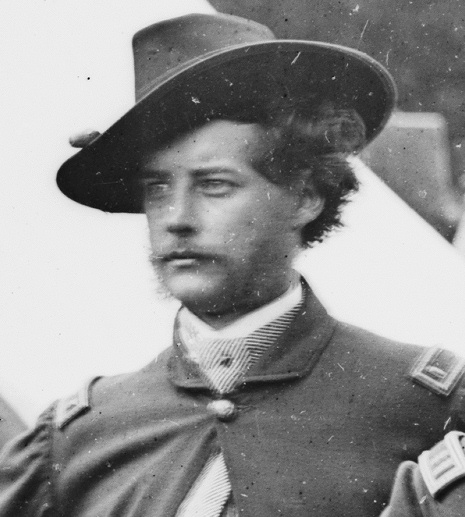
- Born: December 10, 1841; Cincinnati, Ohio, US
- Died: December 31, 1904 (aged 63); Denver, Colorado, US
- Burial place: Green Lawn Cemetery; Columbus, Ohio, US
- Military career
- Allegiance: United States
- Branch: United States Army; Union Army
- Service years: 1861–1870
- Rank: Captain; Brevet Lieutenant Colonel
- Unit: 2nd U.S. Artillery
- Commands: Battery G, 2nd U.S. Artillery; Battery A, 2nd U.S. Artillery
- Conflicts: American Civil War

William Neil Dennison (December 10, 1841 – December 31, 1904) was a United States Army artillery officer during the American Civil War and an attorney and business speculator during his postwar career.

== Early life ==
Born in Cincinnati, Ohio, Dennison was the son of future Governor of Ohio and Postmaster General of the United States William Dennison, Jr. and Anne (Neil) Dennison.

== Civil War ==
At the outbreak of the American Civil War, Dennison's father was serving as the governor of Ohio (1860–1862) and likely influenced Dennison's direct commission into the U.S. Regular Army on August 5, 1861. He was assigned to the 2nd U.S. Artillery, a regiment whose officer corps had produced Chiefs of Artillery for the Union Army of the Potomac and formed the backbone of the famed U.S. Horse Artillery Brigade.

Promoted to first lieutenant on November 12, 1861, Dennison served with the 2nd U.S. Artillery throughout the Civil War, almost entirely with the Horse Artillery Brigade. He gained most of his experience while serving as a section chief with Battery A, 2nd U.S. Artillery under the command of Captain John C. Tidball. During the Peninsula campaign of 1862, Dennison commanded the rear (left) section of Tidball's "flying battery."

He was awarded two brevet promotions for gallantry in combat, including the ranks of captain (for actions at Gaines' Mill and Malvern Hill) and major (for actions at Antietam).

In 1864, Dennison commanded Battery G, 2nd U.S., and eventually returned to command Battery A, 2nd U.S. until the end of the war.

At war's end, he received a brevet promotion to lieutenant colonel for his overall service and conduct during the war.

== Postwar career ==
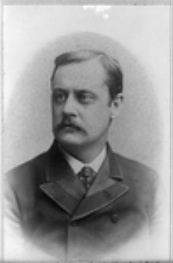
William Neil Dennison, ca 1880s. Library of Congress

Dennison was promoted to the permanent rank of captain in 1867 and requested and received a discharge from the army in 1870.

He appears to have dabbled in politics, perhaps hoping to follow in his father's successful career as Governor of Ohio and Postmaster General of the United States. His public reputation suffered due to unsavory business dealings with questionable acquaintances, and he lost the 1879 mayoral race in Columbus, Ohio.

He moved to Denver, Colorado, where he served as a district attorney and also dabbled in speculative mining and saloons. He was plagued with negative press and maintained somewhat of a rogue's reputation. His business partners, Sam and Lou Blonger, owned gambling houses. Ultimately, he lost his position with the District Attorney's office.

Dennison was married to Mary Cole (or Catherine) Haldeman (October 20, 1851 - December 15, 1882), the daughter of Edwin Haldeman and Harriet Cole. They had four children.

Dennison died December 31, 1904, and was buried in Green Lawn Cemetery in Columbus, Ohio.
