= Alexander C. M. Pennington (general) =

United States Army general (1838–1917)

Alexander C. M. Pennington Jr.
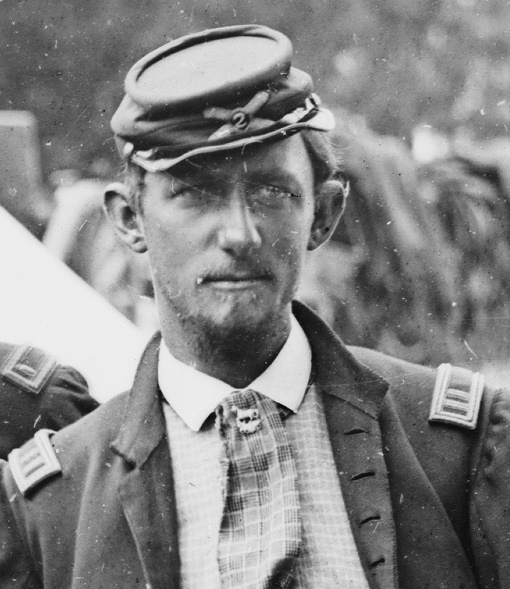
- Alexander C.M. Pennington Jr., 1862. detail of photo by James F. Gibson. Library of Congress
- Born: January 8, 1838; Newark, New Jersey, United States
- Died: November 30, 1917 (aged 79); New York City, New York, United States
- Burial place: West Point Cemetery, New York, United States
- Relatives: Alexander C. M. Pennington (father)
- Military career
- Allegiance: United States of America; Union
- Branch: United States Army; Union Army
- Service years: 1860–1899
- Rank: Major General
- Commands: Battery A, 2nd U.S. Artillery; Battery M, 2nd U.S. Artillery; 3rd New Jersey Volunteer Cavalry; 1st Brigade, 3rd Division, Cavalry Corps; 2nd U.S. Artillery
- Conflicts: American Civil War; Spanish–American War

Alexander Cummings McWhorter Pennington Jr. (January 8, 1838 – November 30, 1917) was an artillery officer and major general in the United States Army and a veteran of both the American Civil War and Spanish–American War.

== Early life and career ==
Pennington was born in Newark, New Jersey on January 8, 1838, the son of Congressman Alexander C. M. Pennington (1810–1867). He was the second cousin of New Jersey Governor and Speaker of the U.S. House of Representatives William Pennington (1796–1862), and the grandnephew of New Jersey Governor William Sandford Pennington (1757–1826).

He attended the United States Military Academy at West Point, during the brief period in the 1850s when the curriculum was expanded to five years. He graduated 18th in the Class of 1860. Appointed as a brevet second lieutenant on graduation day, July 1, 1860, he received his commission February 1, 1861, and was permanently assigned to the 2nd U.S. Artillery. There, he gained experience under the tutelage of Captain John C. Tidball, serving under him in Battery A.

== Civil War ==
Battery A, 2nd U.S. Artillery, was the first unit assigned and equipped as horse artillery, and served throughout the war with the U.S. Horse Artillery Brigade, in the Army of the Potomac. Pennington began the war as the lead (right) section chief in Battery A, and was cited for gallantry in the Peninsula Campaign. He was awarded brevet promotions to captain (June 9, 1863) for actions at Brandy Station, Virginia, and major (July 3, 1863) for actions at Gettysburg.

Pennington commanded Battery M, 2nd U.S. Artillery in the US Horse Artillery Brigade in the various cavalry battles in central Virginia in late 1863 and through the Overland Campaign in Virginia. In March 1864, Pennington was promoted to captain in the regular army, but he desired higher rank and command of a volunteer cavalry regiment. Due to Pennington's ties to New Jersey, he was able to secure a volunteer commission as the colonel of the 3rd New Jersey Volunteer Cavalry on October 7, 1864. After being promoted to colonel, Pennington was quickly elevated to commander of the First Brigade, Third Division in the Cavalry Corps. The 3rd New Jersey Cavalry was part of this brigade. Cited again for gallantry at Cedar Creek (October 19, 1864), he was awarded a brevet promotion to lieutenant colonel.

Pennington commanded the brigade through the final actions in the Shenandoah Valley in February and March 1865 and later in the Appomattox Campaign. Pennington's brigade played a major role in aggressively pursuing the Army of Northern Virginia during April 1–9, 1865, ultimately bringing about the surrender of the Confederate army. Pennington's brigade fought at Dinwiddie Court House, Five Forks, Sailor's Creek, and the final engagements at Appomattox Station. Pennington mustered out of the volunteer service on July 31, 1865. For his distinguished service throughout the war, he was awarded brevet promotions to colonel in the regular army and brigadier general of volunteers. Pennington was nominated for appointment to the grade of brevet brigadier general of volunteers, to rank from July 15, 1865, by President Andrew Johnson on January 13, 1866, and the United States Senate confirmed the appointment on March 12, 1866.

After the war, Pennington became a First Class Companion of the Military Order of the Loyal Legion of the United States, a military society for Union officers.

== Postbellum career ==
After the war, Pennington returned to service in the regular army, serving as a captain in the 1st U.S. Artillery. He transferred to the 4th U.S. Artillery with his promotion to major (November 8, 1882), and remained there as lieutenant colonel (November 28, 1892) until October 1896. He returned to his original regiment, the 2nd U.S. Artillery, where he served as its colonel and commander, from October 29, 1896, to the outbreak of hostilities between the United States and Spain.

Along with his responsibilities as commander of the 2nd Artillery, Pennington served as the commanding officer of Fort Adams in Newport, Rhode Island, from December 1, 1896, to May 24, 1898. In this position Pennington was the senior Army officer in New England and commanded all coastal fortifications from Maine to Connecticut.

During the Spanish–American War, Pennington served as a brigadier general of volunteers from May 4, 1898, to April 12, 1899, and earned his final promotion, to brigadier general in the Regular Army, one day before his retirement, on October 17, 1899.

Pennington retired to New Jersey, where he lived through the beginning of the First World War. Effective August 29, 1916, he was advanced to major general on the retired list. At the time of his death on November 30, 1917, Pennington was living in New York City. On that day, he boarded a train bound for Newark at Pennsylvania Terminal station to attend the funeral of a cousin. Pennington died on board the train and was buried in West Point Cemetery on December 3, 1917. His wife, Clara Miller French Pennington, daughter of The Rev. John W. French, died in 1915.

== Family ==
Alexander and Clara Pennington were the parents of at least five children, including Annie, the wife of Adelbert Cronkhite, and Edith, the second wife of Charles Treat.

== See also ==
- List of American Civil War brevet generals (Union)
