= Henry Benson (soldier) =

American artillery officer

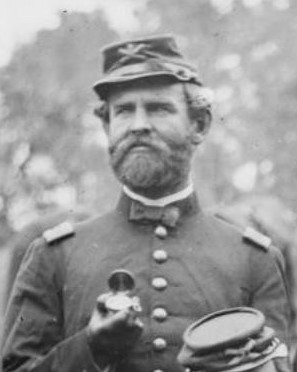
- Born: November 20, 1824; Belleville, New Jersey
- Died: August 11, 1862 (aged 37); At sea, aboard hospital ship S.R. Spaulding
- Burial place: Belleville Dutch Reformed Church
- Military career
- Allegiance: United States of America; Union
- Branch: United States Army; Union Army
- Service years: 1845–1862
- Rank: Captain
- Unit: 2nd U.S. Artillery
- Commands: Battery I, 2nd U.S. Artillery Battery E, 2nd U.S. Artillery; Battery K, 2nd U.S. Artillery (temporarily) Battery M, 2nd U.S. Artillery
- Conflicts: Mexican–American War (WIA); Third Seminole War (WIA); American Civil War: Peninsula Campaign; Seven Days Battles; Engagement at Malvern Hill †

Henry Benson (November 20, 1824 – August 11, 1862) was a career United States Army artillery officer who served in the Mexican–American War, Third Seminole War, and American Civil War with the 2nd U.S. Artillery. He sustained mortal wounds on August 5, 1862, during an engagement at Malvern Hill near the end of the Peninsula Campaign, and died several days later on August 11 while being transported north aboard the steamer S.R. Spaulding.

== Early life ==
Henry Benson was born in Belleville, New Jersey. He enlisted in the United States Army on June 6, 1845, at Fort Hamilton, New York.

He served in the Mexican-American War with Major James Duncan's Battery A, 2nd U.S. Artillery, where he was frequently breveted for "good qualities" from the rank of private in 1845 through the rank of second lieutenant on June 28, 1848, later made permanent after the war on January 26, 1849. Benson was present with Battery A at the battles of Palo Alto, Resaca de la Palma, Monterrey, Vera Cruz, and Churubusco. He rose to the rank of first sergeant in command of an artillery piece in Duncan's battery under section chief Lieutenant Henry Jackson Hunt at the siege of Mexico City, particularly active at the Battle of Chapultepec at the San Cosmé Garita.

In the post-war years, Benson remained an officer of the 2nd U.S. Artillery serving with Batteries D and I, posted variously from New York, South Carolina, Michigan, Kansas, and Texas, as well as extensively throughout Florida. He was promoted to the rank of first lieutenant of Battery E, 2nd U.S. Artillery on March 2, 1853.

In 1854, Benson was posted in Florida, participating in the Army's mission to survey the state and build roads, protect settlers, and relocate the indigenous Seminole tribe—all of which contributed to the Third Seminole War (1855–58). Benson was heavily involved in the Army's surveying efforts, actively exploring rivers, scouting road paths in the field, alternately present at Fort Myers, Fort Meade, Fort Thompson, and Fort Center.

In 1855-56, Benson was often commander of the Battery E, 2nd U.S. while his commander was on sick leave. On August 2, 1856, the unit engaged the Seminoles at Punta Rassa, an action which concluded the regiment's duty in Florida. By the end of the year, all units were transferred back north, headquartered at Fort Hamilton, New York. In the following year, Battery E was posted to Fort Ontario, New York, Fort Mackinac, Michigan, and Fort Snelling, Minnesota, under the command of Captain Arnold Elzey.

In 1857, Battery E, 2nd U.S. was sent to Kansas to assist in quelling unrest, headquartered at Fort Leavenworth. In 1859, Benson was transferred to command of Battery M, 2nd U.S. Artillery, also located at Fort Leavenworth.

== Civil War ==
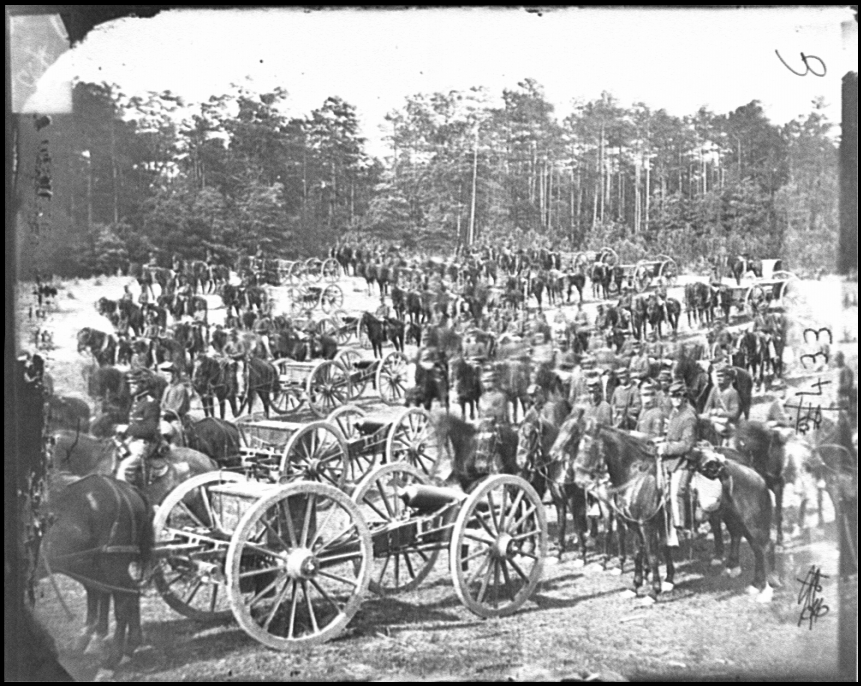
Battery M, 2nd U.S. Artillery, commanded by Captain Henry Benson. Photo taken near Fair Oaks, Virginia, 1862.

Prior to the outbreak of the Civil War, Lieutenant Benson was transferred to Battery C, 2nd U.S. Artillery commanded by Captain Lewis G. Arnold, posted at Fort Independence, Massachusetts; in January 1861, Arnold's command was transferred to the unfinished Fort Jefferson, Florida, in order to aid in the preparation for war following the secession of Florida from the Union. Benson was instrumental in assisting with the transfer of heavy artillery from Fort Taylor, Florida (under command of Captain John Milton Brannan) to arm Fort Jefferson—described by Arnold as "the key of the Gulf"— under the direction of Captain Montgomery C. Meigs.

Benson was engaged in the preparations of Fort Jefferson when war broke out in April 1861.

Fellow New Jersian artillerist Lieutenant Julius A. De Lagnel, whose second lieutenancy Benson succeeded in 1849, defected to the Confederate States in 1861.

Benson was promoted to the rank of captain on May 14, 1861. Following the First Battle of Bull Run in July 1861, Battery M, 2nd U.S. commander Major Henry J. Hunt was promoted to colonel as the Chief of Artillery for the defenses of Washington, D.C., and Benson was transferred to command of Battery M in September 1861.

In November 1861, Battery M was converted to a horse artillery battery, equipped with six 3-inch Ordnance rifles.

In 1862 Battery M moved with the Army of the Potomac into Virginia as part of Major General George B. McClellan's Peninsula Campaign (March–July 1862). Attached to the Artillery Reserve of the Army of the Potomac under Colonel Henry J. Hunt, Battery M was assigned to the First Brigade (U.S. Horse Artillery Brigade) under the command of Lieutenant Colonel William Hays. Benson led his unit effectively through the Siege of Yorktown, the Battle of Hanover Court House, and the Battle of Seven Pines (Fair Oaks Station).

At Seven Pines on May 31, 1862, Benson reported that Battery M had a combined total strength of "four officers [including section chiefs Lieutenants Peter C. Hains, John W. Barlow, and Robert H. Chapin], 109 noncommissioned officers, mechanics, privates. . . . 141 horses, and six 3-inch rifled guns, with caissons and ammunition complete."

Battery M was held in reserve at the beginning of the Seven Days Battles (June 25–July 1, 1862), stationed south of the Chickahominy River at Camp Lincoln near Savage's Station following previous detached service with Brigadier General Fitz John Porter's V Corps. The battery remained in camp during the battles of Beaver Dam Creek/Mechanicsville and Gaines' Mill, and was then deployed to cover the approaches of a bridge over the Chickahominy on June 28 during the V Corps' retreat south of the river; on June 29, the battery moved through the White Oak Swamp and was detailed to an advanced night reconnaissance with Colonel William Averell's 3rd Pennsylvania Cavalry beyond the Glendale crossroad, accompanying Brigadier General George A. McCall's Third Division, V Corps toward Malvern Hill, into the early morning of June 30; the battery moved on to Malvern Hill prior to the Battle of Glendale, but was hotly engaged the following day with the rest of the Horse Artillery Brigade during the Battle of Malvern Hill on July 1.

For his service, Captain Benson was reported to be a favorite officer of General McClellan.

=== Death ===
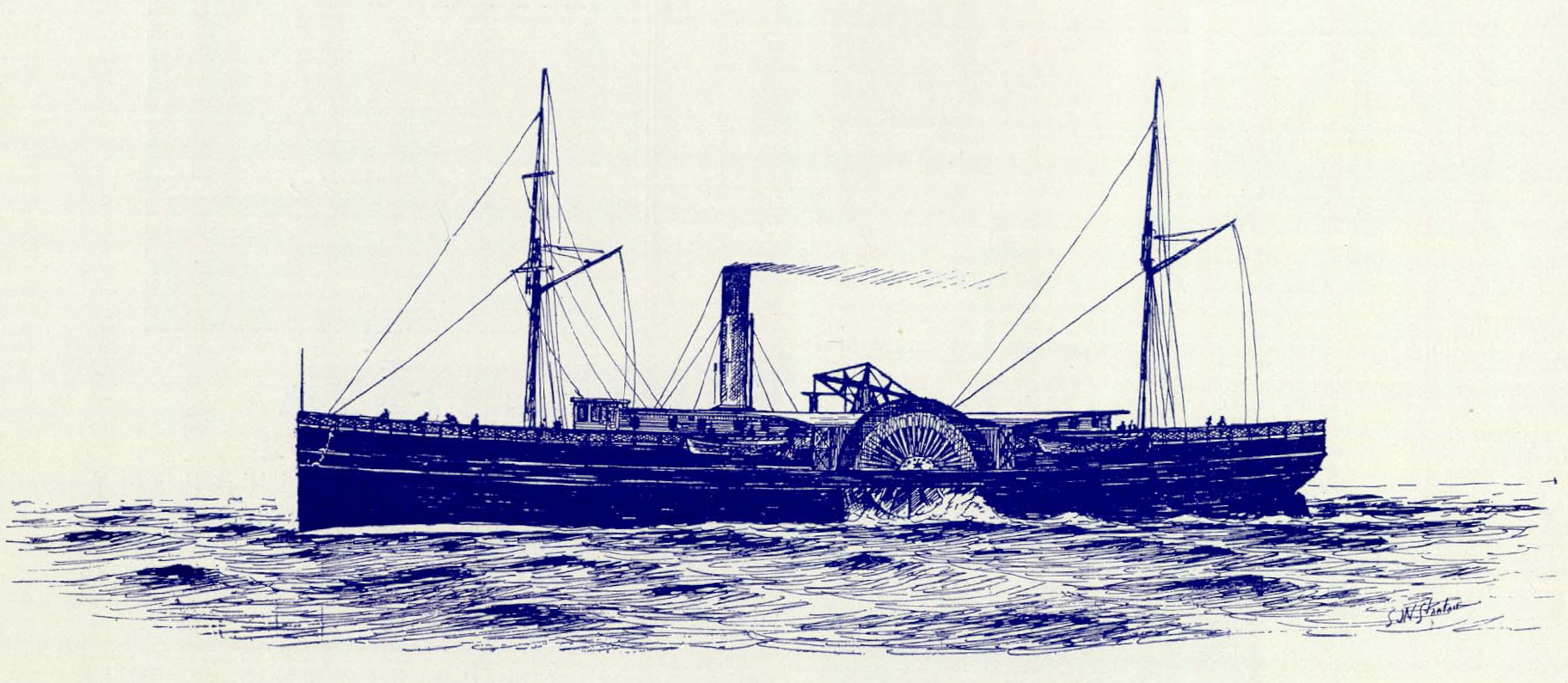
Steamer S.R. Spaulding

The Seven Days battles proved disastrous for the Army of the Potomac, and McClellan refused to take further offensive action from his position at the Union camp at Harrison's Landing on the James River without reinforcements. On August 3, 1862, McClellan was ordered by General-in-Chief Henry Halleck to retreat from the peninsula to Aquia Creek and terminate his campaign in order to meet up with the Army of Virginia under Major General John Pope—an order he only begrudgingly complied with nearly two weeks later.

On August 5, 1862, in a second engagement at Malvern Hill, Virginia (not to be confused with the earlier Battle of Malvern Hill), Benson's Battery M, 2nd U.S., supported by Captain James M. Robertson's Battery B & L, 2nd U.S., engaged two regiments of Confederate infantry and an artillery battery in the early hours of the morning. Benson was mortally wounded during the fire when his leg was broken by a fragment from a burst artillery shell; it was reported to be from one of Battery M's own 3-inch Ordnance rifles.

Benson was removed to the hospital transport steamship S.R. Spaulding for transport north to medical treatment, but died at sea of his wounds on August 11, 1862. His remains were returned to his hometown of Belleville, New Jersey and buried in the Belleville Dutch Reformed Churchyard on August 13, 1862.

== Legacy ==
In 1864, an artillery battery in defenses of Washington, D.C., was named Battery Henry Benson.

An Endicott Era coast artillery battery at Fort Worden was named after Benson in 1904.

A street in his hometown of Belleville is also named in his honor.

== See also ==
- 2nd U.S. Artillery
- United States Horse Artillery Brigade
