= Battery A, 2nd U.S. Artillery =

For this article, “Company A” and “Battery A” are interchangeable. A battery of four to six cannons, with two to three two-cannon sections was the basic unit of the artillery branch. The organization was commanded by a captain with first and second lieutenants as section chiefs and chief of caissons. A battery organization was roughly company strength, as it related to the infantry branch. As such, the formal designation of an artillery battery by the U.S. Army was “company.”

This article is primarily excerpts from the history of the 2nd Regiment of Artillery by its regimental adjutant, First Lieutenant William Augustus Simpson (USMA Class of 1875), written ca. 1893 and published in Rodenbough, 1896:

"The Second Artillery was, with the First, Third, and Fourth, organized by an Act of Congress dated March 21, 1821. Each regiment was to have one colonel, one lieutenant-colonel, one major, one supernumerary captain (for ordnance duty), one adjutant, one sergeant-major, and nine companies. Each company was to have a captain, two first lieutenants, two second lieutenants, and fifty-seven enlisted men. One company was to be designated and equipped as light artillery, but for many years it was such only in name.

The list of organizations (given in the Army Register) from which these regiments were formed is misleading, as some of the organizations mentioned had been out of existence for years. The four regiments were formed from the Corps of Artillery, the Regiment of Light Artillery, and the Ordnance, the Second being taken mainly from the Corps of Artillery. All ordnance duty was to be done by the artillery.

There was a second regiment of artillery during the War of 1812, of which Winfield Scott was lieutenant-colonel and then colonel. After the war it was merged into the Corps of Artillery. The names of battles of that war are borne on the regimental colors to-day, a few of the officers of the new Second had belonged to the old, and some of the companies may have belonged to both regiments, a fact I am unable to establish; but as a whole the Second Artillery of 1812 was a different organization from the Second Artillery of 1821."

== Early history of Battery A ==
In 1821, Company A was formed from the remnants of the second battalion of the Northern Division of the old Artillery Corps. The new company was placed under the command of Captain Alexander Fanning, and was stationed on post at the U.S. Military Academy at West Point, New York.

The entire regiment was transferred to the South, exchanging stations with the 1st Regiment of Artillery. During the fall of 1833, Company A was sent to Alabama along with Companies B and C, and served under Colonel David E. Twiggs during the removal of the Creek nation of Native Americans out of the state.

In 1836, Company A participated (along with B, C, G, and H) in the Florida Seminole War, being stationed in Tampa. On February 27, the battery was engaged during the fighting at Withlacoochee. General Winfield Scott took command of the U.S. Army forces in the area, and assigned Companies A, B, G, and H to Colonel William Lindsay's column, at Fort Brooke.

Battery A participated in the removal of the Cherokee nation from Alabama and Tennessee in 1838, as it was being reassigned to posting along the Great Lakes, also referred to as the “Niagara frontier”.

== Light Artillery Duty ==
According to Lt. W. A. Simpson:

"In 1839 Secretary of War Poinsett ordered the establishment of a camp of instruction at Trenton, New Jersey; one company of each artillery regiment to be sent there and equipped as a battery of light artillery. A of the 2d was selected and went there under command of Lieut. (afterwards Captain) James Duncan, who made it so famous in the war with Mexico. Three months later it returned to Buffalo as a light battery."

In 1841, Battery A was stationed at Fort Hamilton, Brooklyn, New York.

== Mexican War, 1846–1848 ==
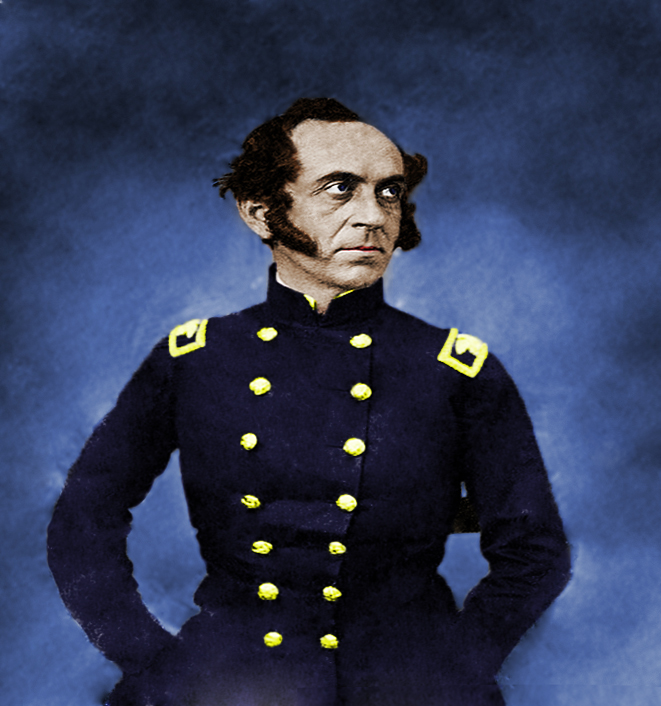
U.S. Army captain James Duncan of Illinois received three brevets—major, lieutenant-colonel, and colonel—for his actions in the Mexican War. Pictured in 1848 as colonel by Mathew Brady

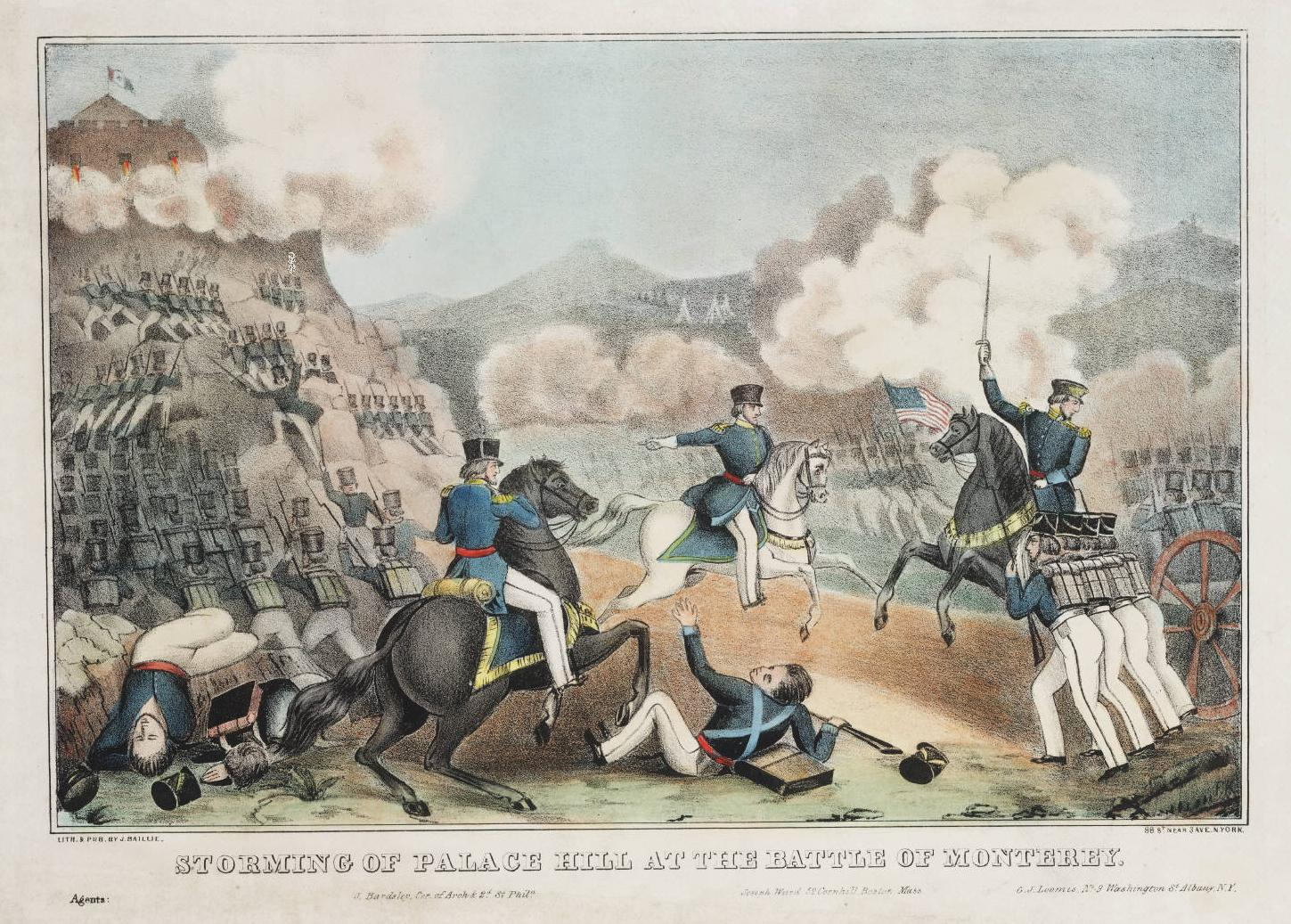
An artillery duel during the Battle of Monterrey

Light Battery A, under the command of First Lieutenant James Duncan, left New York Harbor in August 1845, arriving in September at Corpus Christi to join General Zachary Taylor's army. Along with C and K, "as a part of the artillery battalion, and A were engaged at Palo Alto (May 8) and Resaca de la Palma (May 9). Duncan by his brilliant advance and attack, without orders, on the Mexican right at Palo Alto, did much towards winning the battle and was specially mentioned by General Taylor."

Later that fall, batteries A, C, G and K formed part of Worth's Division and took an important part in the taking of Battle of Monterrey, September 21–24, 1846. According to Lieutenant W. A. Simpson:

In March, 1847, the whole regiment, except E, which was sent to Fort Brown, was assembled before Vera Cruz. On the organization of the Army of Invasion the regiment was assigned to Worth's regular division. The reduction of Vera Cruz was largely the work of the artillery, Colonel Bankhead, the senior field officer, acting as chief of artillery, in command of the batteries. The regiment took part in all the battles of the campaign, figuring most prominently and suffering the heaviest losses at Churubusco, Molino del Rey, and City of Mexico." At Molino Del Rey, all the lieutenants of Duncan's battery (H. J. Hunt, Win. Hays, and H. F. Clarke) were slightly wounded. At Chapultepec, “it became necessary to advance a piece of artillery along the causeway, which was swept by the enemy's fire, against a breast-work. Lieutenant Hunt, of Duncan's battery, was ordered to execute this duty. Advancing at full speed for 150 yards, with a loss of more than half his men, he accomplished his object and engaged the enemy muzzle to muzzle. Gen. Worth says, in his official report, ‘It has never been my fortune to witness a more brilliant exhibition of courage and conduct.’ Throughout the campaign Duncan's battery (A) was splendidly handled and made a brilliant record."

At the end of the war, Battery A was reassigned to duty at Fort McHenry, in Baltimore.

== Antebellum Period, 1848–1861 ==
Stationed at Fort McHenry with the Regimental Headquarters during much of this period, Battery A and many of the rest of its sister companies were assigned to Fort Leavenworth, Kansas, during the uprisings there, between 1857 and 1859.

== Civil War, 1861–1865 ==
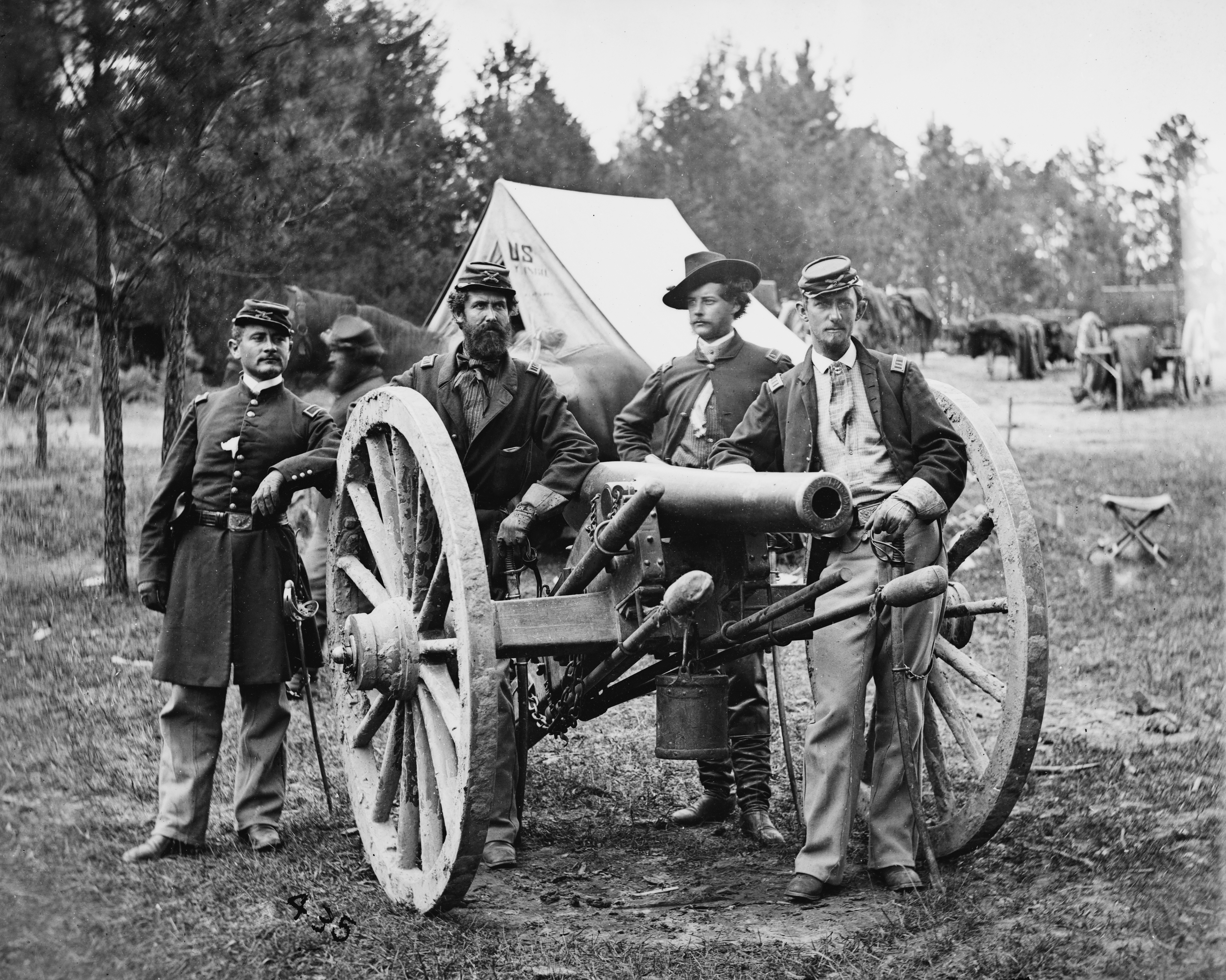
Fair Oaks, Va., vicinity. Lieutenant Robert Clarke, Capt. John C. Tidball, Lieutenant William N. Dennison, and Capt. Alexander C.M. Pennington.

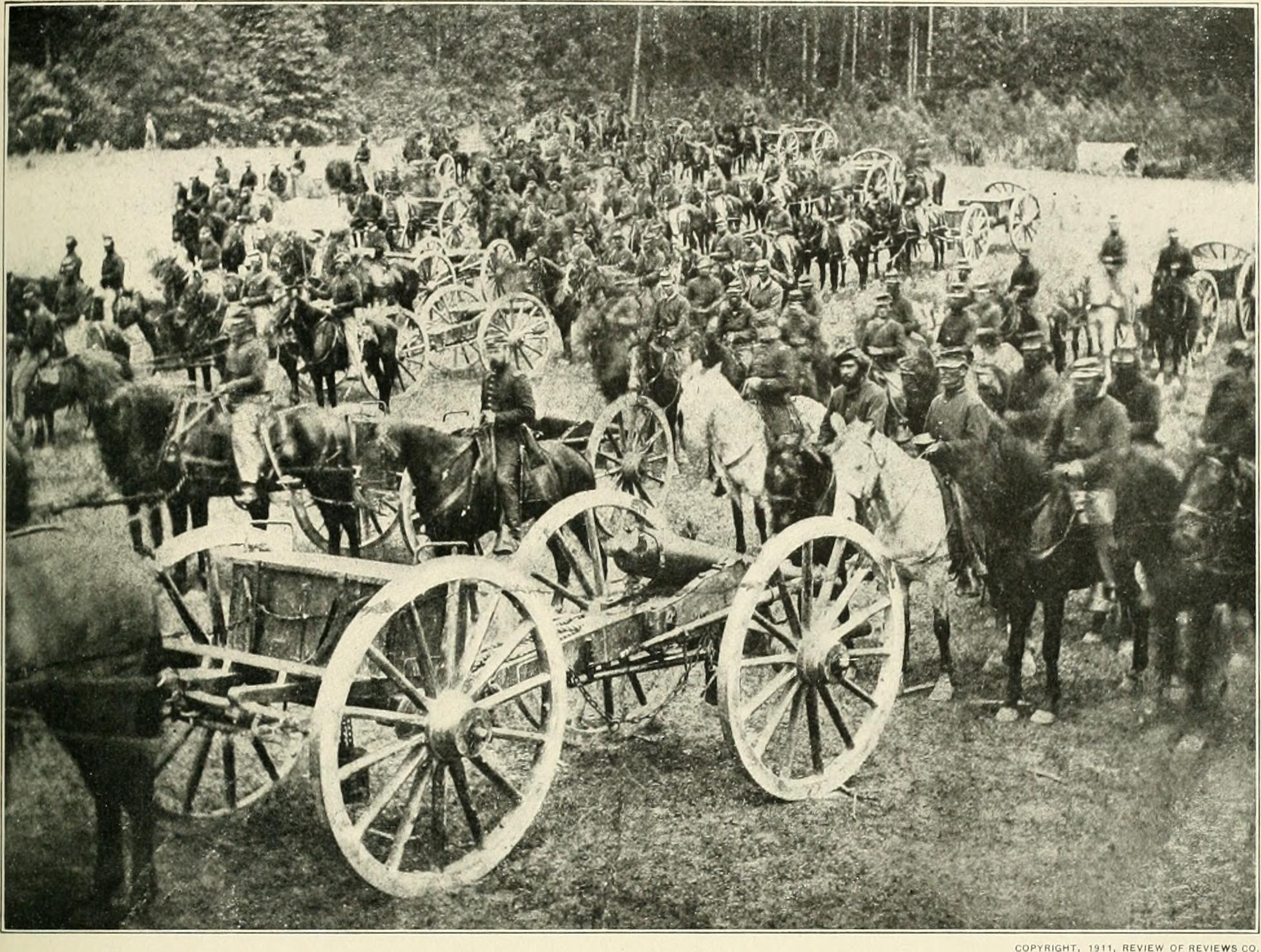
Harry Benson's Battery A, of the 2nd U.S. Artillery, and Horatio Gates Gibson's Batteries C and G, combined of the 3rd U.S. Artillery, near Fair Oaks, Virginia.

“In the early days of the regiment it served as infantry; occasionally, in the Florida War, serving light field pieces. In the Mexican War the foot batteries served as infantry, and at Vera Cruz and Chapultepec served siege artillery. In the Civil War all the batteries in active service were mounted, and all those serving continuously with the Army of the Potomac became horse batteries.”

Battery A, 2nd U.S. was ordered east from Fort Leavenworth, Kansas to the defenses of Washington, D.C. at the beginning of 1861. It was deployed temporarily to Florida, but soon returned to the Eastern Theater before the First Battle of Bull Run, and was outfitted as a horse artillery battery in September 1861.

Among the most prominent units in the U.S. Horse Artillery Brigade was Battery A, serving under the command of Captain John Caldwell Tidball, of Virginia, who replaced Captain William F. Barry upon his own promotion in May 1861.

Tidball's Battery A was equipped with three sections each of two 3” Ordnance Rifles. The section chiefs were First Lieutenants Alexander Cummings McWhorter Pennington, Jr., of New Jersey, and William Neil Dennison of Ohio, and Second Lieutenant Robert Clarke of Pennsylvania.

Tidball commanded the battery personally early in the war, but eventually rose to brigade command and later volunteer service with the 4th New York Heavy Artillery; from 1863 until the end of the war in 1865, the company was commanded in the field by his subordinate lieutenants.

"The successive Chiefs of Artillery of the Army of the Potomac, William. F. Barry and Henry J. Hunt, had been officers of the 2d until 1861. The first commander of the Horse Artillery Brigade, Wm. Hays, his successor, John M. Robertson (sic), and the first commander of the 2d Horse Artillery Brigade, J. C. Tidball, were all captains of the 2d. When all the horse artillery of the Army of the Potomac was, in 1864, consolidated into one brigade, the command was given to Capt. Robertson. This brigade organization was, however, apparently only for administrative purposes, batteries being detached for duty with divisions or brigades of cavalry, the whole brigade never acting together as a fighting unit under command of its chief.

Battery A was the first to reach Washington, arriving in January, 1861. It formed a part of the expedition for the relief of Fort Pickens in April, but returned in time to take part in the first Bull Run. In September it was made a horse battery, the first in this country. In the spring of 1862 it went to the Peninsula, forming, with B and L (Robertson), and M. (Benson) of the 2d and C (Gibson) of the 3d, the famous Horse Artillery Brigade. At Yorktown during the siege it was in pursuit with Stoneman's cavalry after the evacuation, and was engaged at Williamsburg, New Bridge, and Mechanicsville. It covered the withdrawal of the army from the left bank of the Chickahominy, being engaged at Gaines' Mill. It was engaged at Malvern Hill, July 1, and at Westover, July 3. While at Harrison's Landing a corporal died, and permission to fire the usual salute being refused, it occurred to Capt. Tidball to have "taps" sounded instead; whence the origin of this custom. The battery was with the rear guard on the withdrawal from the Peninsula. In the Maryland campaign it was in the advance with Pleasanton's cavalry, and was engaged at Boonsboro, Antietam, and Shepherdstown. It was with the cavalry in advance during the movement into Virginia, and was engaged at Piedmont, November 3, and Amissville, November 10. The battery was out with Averell's cavalry in April, 1863, and was engaged at Rapidan Station, May 1, and with Pleasanton at Upperville, June 20. It went to Gettysburg with Buford's cavalry, at which battle it fired the first shot, and after that battle was engaged at Williamsport, July 4, Boonsboro, July 8 and 9 July, and Funkstown, July 10. The battery, during September, was in action at Culpeper, Raccoon Ford, and Robinson River. In the campaign of 1864 the battery was engaged at Cold Harbor, Bottom's Bridge, Trevilian Station, and St. Mary's Church. While with the army before Petersburg it was several times detached on expeditions with the cavalry, being engaged at Deep Bottom, July 28, Lee's Mill, July 31, Deep Run, August 16, Vaughn Plank Road, September 29, Boydton Plank Road, October 27, Stoney Creek, December 1, and on the Weldon Railroad, December 7–11. The battery was engaged at Dinwiddie C. H., March 31, Farmville, April 7, and Appomatox, April 9. After Lee's surrender it started for North Carolina with Sheridan, returning when Johnston's surrender was known. The battery was commanded by Captain Tidball until June, 1863; by Lieutenant Calef at Gettysburg; by Lieutenant Clarke until June, 1864; by Lieutenant Dennison until February, 1865*; then, until after the surrender, by Lieutenant Lord."

== Postwar period, 1865–1898 ==
Battery A returned to Fort McHenry after the war, and was later assigned to West Coast posts in California. Only temporarily assigned to the West during the Plains Indian Wars, in 1869, its primary duties were in the East. It participated in the inauguration of Rutherford B. Hayes, in 1877, helped quell the labor riots of 1877, and participated in the guarding of President James Garfield after his shooting. By 1885, Battery A was reassigned to Little Rock, Arkansas. In 1889, it transferred to Fort Riley, Kansas.

== Spanish–American War ==
During the Spanish–American War (1898) it served in Cuba under Captain George S. Grimes. After the war, the Artillery branch was again reorganized into an Artillery Corps on February 2, 1901. With the reorganization, the nineteenth century regimental system disappeared. Company A was re-designated as the 3rd Battery, Field Artillery.

== Commanders ==
The following is a list of company commanders (holding the rank of captain) during the existence of Battery A, 2nd U.S. (1821 – 1901) before its reorganization into the Field Artillery branch, including notable temporary commanders during the American Civil War:

- Captain Alexander C.W. Fanning, 1821 – 1822
- Captain Thomas Legate, 1822 – 1837
- Captain James Green, 1837 – 1842
- Captain Edmund Schriver, 1842 –1847
- Captain James Duncan, 1847 – 1849
- Captain John Sedgwick, 1849 – 1855
- Captain John Caldwell Tidball, 1861 – 1867
  - Second Lieutenant John Haskell Calef, July 1863 (Battle of Gettysburg)
  - First Lieutenant Robert Clarke, August 1863 – February 9, 1865
  - First Lieutenant James Henry Lord, in 1865
- Captain Joseph Gales Ramsay, 1867 – 1879
- Captain Alexander Cummings McWhorter Pennington, Jr., 1879 – 1882
- Captain John Isaac Rodgers, 1882 – 1883
- Captain Frank Brown Hamilton, 1883 – 1887
- Captain William Preston Graves, 1887 – 1889
- Captain Asher Clayton Taylor, 1889
- Captain Frank Carter Grugan, 1889 – 1891
- Captain George Simeon Grimes, 1891 - 1899
- Captain Edwin St. John Greble, 1899
- Captain Lotus Niles, 1899–1901

== See also ==
- Field Artillery Branch (United States)

== Sources ==
- Heitman, Francis B. Historical Register and Dictionary of the United States Army, From its Organization, September 29, 1789 to March 2, 1903. Washington, DC: Government Printing Office, 1903.
- Simpson, Lieutenant W. A. "Second Regiment of Artillery." In Rodenbough, Brevet Brigadier General Theo. F. and Major William L. Haskin, eds. The Army of the United States: Historical Sketches of Staff and Line with Portraits of Generals-in-Chief. New York: Maynard, Merrilee, & Company, 1896.
- US War Department. The War of the Rebellion: A Compilation of the Official Records of the Union and Confederate Armies. Washington, DC: Government Printing Office, 1894.
