= John Kaiser (Medal of Honor) =

John Kaiser (1825 – January 9, 1894) was a German-born Medal of Honor recipient and soldier in the Union Army during the American Civil War.

== Biography ==
Kaiser was born in Nerzogenaurach, Germany in 1825. At some point between his birth and the start of the Civil War, he immigrated to the United States. He served as a Sergeant in Company E of the 2nd U.S. Artillery Regiment during the war. He earned his medal in action at Richmond, Virginia on June 27, 1862. Kaiser's medal was issued on April 2, 1878. Kaiser died in Buffalo, New York on January 9, 1894. He is buried in Forest Lawn Cemetery in Buffalo, New York.

== Medal of Honor citation ==
For gallant and meritorious service on June 27, 1862, in action during the Seven Day Battle before Richmond, Virginia.
