= John C. Tidball =

US Army officer and Commander, Department of Alaska (1825–1906)

John Caldwell Tidball
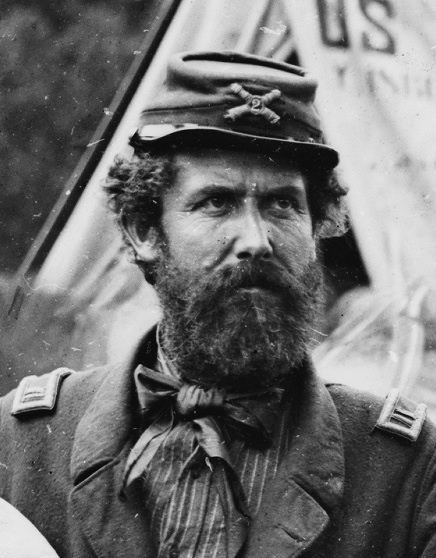

3rd Commander of the Department of Alaska
- In office September 23, 1870 – September 19, 1871
- President: Ulysses S. Grant
- Preceded by: George K. Brady
- Succeeded by: Harvey A. Allen

Personal details
- Born: January 25, 1825 near Wheeling, Virginia (present-day West Virginia)
- Died: May 17, 1906 (aged 81) Montclair, New Jersey
- Resting place: West Point Cemetery; West Point, New York. US

Military service
- Allegiance: United States
- Branch/service: United States Army; Union Army
- Years of service: 1848–1889
- Rank: Colonel; Brevet Major General, U.S. Volunteers
- Unit: 2nd U.S. Artillery; 4th New York Heavy Artillery; 3rd U.S. Artillery; 1st U.S. Artillery
- Battles/wars: Third Seminole War; American Civil War; Peninsula Campaign; Battle of Antietam; Battle of Chancellorsville; Battle of Gettysburg; Overland Campaign; Siege of Petersburg

John Caldwell Tidball (January 25, 1825 – May 15, 1906) was a career United States Army artillery officer who served in the United States Horse Artillery Brigade in the Union Army of the Potomac during the American Civil War. After the war, he served as the Commander of the Department of Alaska, the military governor of the region.

== Early life and antebellum career ==
Tidball was born near Wheeling, Virginia, in Ohio County, Virginia (present-day West Virginia), to parents: James Squires Tidball and Maria Caldwell. He grew up on a farm in eastern Ohio. He graduated eleventh of thirty-eight cadets in the United States Military Academy Class of 1848, and entered the United States Army as a brevet second lieutenant in Battery E, 3rd U.S. Artillery. He was commissioned second lieutenant on February 14, 1849, when he was transferred to Battery M, 2nd U.S. Artillery. Promoted to first lieutenant on March 31, 1853, he transferred again to Battery B, 2nd U.S. Artillery. He served in the Third Seminole War fought against the indigenous Seminole tribe, and accompanied an exploring expedition to California in 1853–1854. In 1859 he was sent on the Army's expedition to Harper's Ferry, Virginia, to suppress John Brown's raid.

== Civil War ==
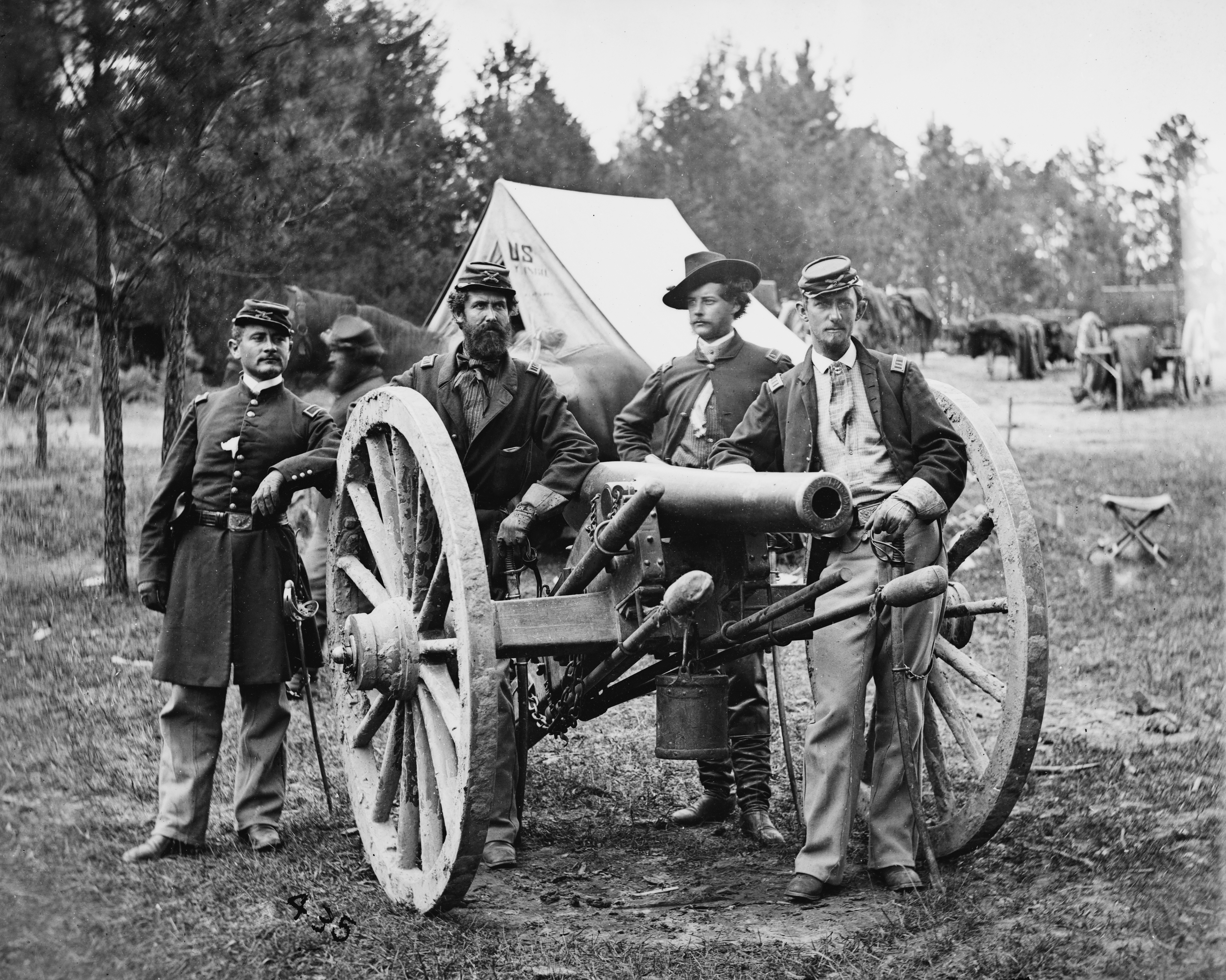
Captain John C. Tidball and the officers of Battery A, 2nd U.S. Artillery, at Fair Oaks, Virginia, June 1, 1862. (Left to right, Lt. Robert Clarke, Tidball, Lt. William N. Dennison, Lt. Alexander C.M. Pennington, Jr.)

Tidball served all through the Civil War, receiving five brevet commissions for gallant and meritorious conduct on the field, and being complimented personally by President Abraham Lincoln for his work at the Battle of Gettysburg, where he was in command of the Second Brigade Horse Artillery under Major General Alfred Pleasonton. He served in most of the major campaigns in the Eastern Theater, from the First Battle of Bull Run through the Siege of Petersburg.

At the outbreak of hostilities, he ranked as a first lieutenant and section chief in Captain William F. Barry's Battery A, 2nd U.S. Artillery. After Barry's promotion, on May 14, 1861, Tidball was promoted to captain and became the company commander. Tidball served with his "flying" battery as part of the famed U.S. Horse Artillery Brigade from its inception in 1861 until June 1863. In 1862, he was credited with introducing the custom of sounding "Taps" to conclude a military funeral.

With slow advancement in the ranks of the Regular Army (United States) (especially in the artillery branch), Tidball sought higher responsibilities elsewhere, by accepting a commission in the U.S. Volunteers. He was appointed colonel of the 4th New York Heavy Artillery Regiment, August 28, 1863. He commanded Brigade 4 of the Defenses South of the Potomac XXII Corps (Union Army), September 2, 1863–November 5, 1863, transferring to the command of Brigade 3, November 5, 1863, to March 26, 1864.

Tidball commanded the artillery of the II Corps of the Army of the Potomac during the Overland Campaign, including the Battle of the Wilderness, April 1864–July 6, 1864. He was commandant of cadets at West Point from July 10, 1864, to September 22, 1864. He then returned to the field, leading the artillery of the IX Corps from October 8, 1864, until April 24, 1865, in the Appomattox Campaign and April 24, 1865–June 30, 1865, in the Department of Washington. He then resumed command of Brigade 3, of the Defenses South of the Potomac XXII Corps (Union Army). Tidball was mustered out of the volunteers on September 26, 1865.

On December 12, 1864, President Abraham Lincoln nominated Tidball for appointment to the grade of brevet brigadier general of volunteers, to rank from August 1, 1864, and the United States Senate confirmed the appointment on February 20, 1865.

On July 17, 1866, President Andrew Johnson nominated Tidball for appointment to the grade of brevet brigadier general in the regular United States Army, to rank from March 13, 1865, and the United States Senate confirmed the appointment on July 23, 1866.

On January 13, 1866, President Andrew Johnson nominated Tidball for appointment to the grade of brevet major general of volunteers, to rank from April 2, 1865, and the United States Senate confirmed the appointment on March 12, 1866.

=== Wartime evaluations ===
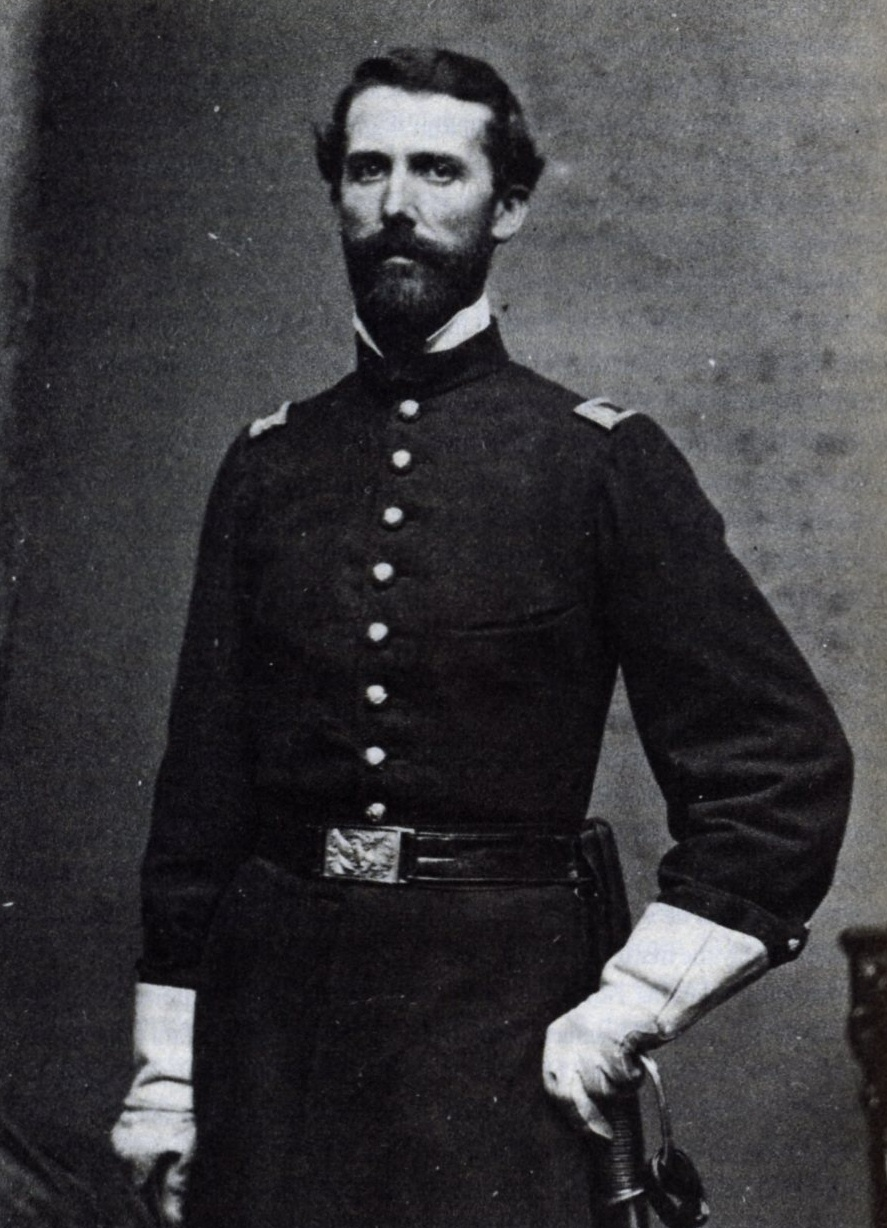
Captain John C. Tidball, 1861. USMA Archives

To the frustration of all professionals within the Artillery branch, promotions were notoriously slow in comparison with the Infantry and Cavalry branches. Tidball commanded a brigade of horse artillery as a captain, fought in most of the major battles and campaigns of the war, and was frequently cited for efficiency, reliability and military professionalism. He was frequently discussed among the high command as a candidate well-deserving of promotion. But as was typical of his branch, he was just as frequently passed over. The following are some of the opinions expressed about him from his commanders, subordinate officers, and even some of his men, as found within Eugene Tidball's 2002 biography (No Disgrace to My Country):

John Haskell Calef, wrote of his first impressions as a second lieutenant, serving under Tidball in Battery A, 2nd U.S. Artillery:

Joining his battery in December 1862, as a second lieutenant, I was led to believe by some of my brother subalterns that our captain was very exacting, of choleric temperament and much of a martinet. His personal appearance at the time was strikingly martial, especially when mounted. Above the average height, his dark piercing eyes with a far-off thoughtful expression, handsome regular features, dark-brown wavy hair, beard and mustache, and in the prime of manhood, he reminded me of a picture I once saw, of the "Knight in Search of the Holy Grail." In due time I discovered that if duty was well performed, service with him was most agreeable. Behind the austere, rather reticent and dignified exterior, there existed a love of humor and an affability that only required circumstances to develop… He would at times emerge from his dignified reserve and entertain us youngsters, as we sat around the blaze of winter quarters, with interesting stories of the army "befo’ de wah."

Alfred Pleasonton, commander of the Cavalry Corps at Gettysburg, mentioned Tidball and James M. Robertson, each commanding a brigade of horse artillery batteries, in his battle report:

[Tidball and Robertson] are now performing the duties of general officers with only the rank of captain, and I most urgently recommend that they be promoted to the rank of Brigadier General. The Artillery arm requires organization in the higher grades. There are no general officers who by their service are so much entitled to this distinction as Captains Robertson and Tidball.

One of Tidball's mentors, Henry Jackson Hunt, added the following to Pleasanton's recommendation:

They have seen their juniors passed over their heads, and have been compelled to serve when they were entitled by their experience to command.

Upon the vacancy within the 4th New York Heavy Artillery, his other career champion, William F. Barry, wrote:

The Regiment very much needs a Colonel who is not only a good soldier, but who possesses sufficient artillery information and experience to instruct and handle the Regiment properly in this special service. I believe these qualifications can only be found combined in some suitable officer of the Regular Artillery of the Army of the United States. Should the vacancy which I now anticipate really occur, I respectfully present Captain John Tidball of the 2d Regt. U.S. Artillery as an officer in all respects admirably suited for the position… I am confident that (the 4th New York Heavy Artillery) will soon become… a credit to the State and models of their kind.

Upon his arrival to the 4th New York, Private James Hildreth (of Battery F) was not happy, writing home that:

The colonel is as mean now as he was good when he first took command. Everyone hates him from the highest officer to the lowest private. He is the meanest man I ever see.

Hildreth later changed his tune, writing home again that:

Colonel Tidball is very strict, but uses us better than Hall used to. He has always spoke pleasant to me and he makes the officers stand around more than he does the men, they fear him more.

== Postbellum career ==
After being mustered out of the volunteers, Tidball reverted to his Regular Army grade of captain. He was promoted to major, February 5, 1867. He was in active service until his retirement on January 25, 1889. He was the 3rd Commander of the Department of Alaska (which preceded the position of Governor of Alaska), and lived there for six years. He was Commandant of Cadets at West Point in 1864, and was Commandant at the Artillery School at Fort Monroe in Virginia, reorganizing artillery instruction and raising its standards during his tenure. He was promoted to colonel and served as aide-de-camp to General William T. Sherman during the latter's tenure as general-in-chief of the U.S. Army, January 1, 1881–February 8, 1884. He was transferred to the 1st Regiment of Artillery, November 10, 1882, the 3rd U.S. Artillery, January 25, 1884, and the 1st Regiment of Artillery again, March 22, 1885.

When Tidball retired, he was regarded as the Army's premier artillerist. His 1880 instruction book, Manual Of Heavy Artillery Service, served for decades as the army's guidebook to artillery strategy and operations. Tidball was appointed brigadier general on the retired list, April 23, 1904.

== Personal life ==
John C. Tidball married twice. His first wife, Mary Hunt Davis (d. 1857), was the daughter of Lieutenant Jackman Davis (d. 1828), USMA Class of 1814. The two were married May 27, 1853, and had three children together: Virginia (1855–1856), John Satterlee (b. 1856), and Walton Caldwell (1857–1896). Mary died of complications after Walton's birth, in 1857.

His second wife, Mary Langdon "Mamie" Dana (ca. 1845–1892), was the daughter of Major General Napoleon J. T. Dana. General Dana, only three years older than Tidball (and six ahead of him at West Point, graduating with the USMA Class of 1842), first opposed the match, given the 20 years difference in age and life experience, but eventually consented, due to Tidball's excellent reputation and the couple's obvious affection. John and Mamie were married March 19, 1870, and built a family of their own: Sue Dana (b. 1871), Alfred Dana (b. 1872), Nora Langdon (b. 1873), and twins Mabel and William (b. 1875).

He died on May 15, 1906, at the age of 81 in his residence in Montclair, New Jersey, and was buried in the post cemetery at the United States Military Academy in West Point, New York.

== Writings and memoirs ==
John C. Tidball wrote a comprehensive overview and analysis of the U.S. Army's field artillery service in the Civil War in the Journal of the Military Service Institution from 1891 to 1893, entitled, "The Artillery Service in the War of the Rebellion." He also wrote an unpublished study in 1905 for the U.S. Army entitled, "Remarks Upon the Organization, Command and Employment of Field Artillery During War, Based on Experiences of the Civil War, 1861–1865", which included additional insights into the artillery service. These writings were edited by Lawrence M. Kaplan and published under the title, "The Artillery Service in the War of the Rebellion" by Westholme Publishing in 2011. John C. Tidball's memoirs, yet unpublished but heavily excerpted in Eugene Tidball's 2002 biography, are a treasure trove of information. They are filled with colorful descriptions and his impressions of his more famous contemporaries, many of whom he described as "genuine army characters." Through these writings, one can learn a great deal about John C. Tidball, along with the personalities he so brilliantly described:

Ambrose E. Burnside

Tidball served with Burnside at his first duty station after graduation from West Point. Burnside was among the other young officers who had just returned from the war with Mexico:

He had naturally a swaggering way which caused all such affections to set gracefully upon him. He was, besides, a handsome fellow with a personality that attracted attention upon all occasions; and his rollicking, off-hand effrontery carried him through with applause where one of less assurance would have been a mere figurehead. His manly proportions and devil-may-care airishness were attractive to women, and aroused in them that admiration for masculine qualities so natural to the female sex. Always jolly and willing, he was an ideal companion among men. His rollicking songs and jovial stories awakened the dullest to rapture. Free and easy in manner and with but little regard for the nicer conventionalities of society he floated along, light hearted and gay, upon the flood tide of enjoyment, seemingly regardless of what the ebb might have in store for him. The very abandon with which he threw himself into whatever was going on exercised a captivating influence and caused him to be sought as one who could always be relied on to give animation to any occasion… [his] trick of self-abnegation seemed not only to help him along but to cover over shortcomings, as it did when dismal failure followed many of his enterprises… There was no one like Burnside.

Thomas Jonathan Jackson

Tidball and Jackson were assigned to the same company in the Corps of Cadets at West Point. They were of similar backgrounds, were both Presbyterian, were from the same section of Virginia (what is now West Virginia), and each spent most of their cadet careers as non-rank-holding cadet privates:

In consequence of a somewhat shambling, awkward gait, and the habit of carrying his head down in a thoughtful attitude, he seemed less of stature than he really was. His features, without being homely, were rather strongly marked. He had bluish gray eyes and a somewhat sallow complexion, but which inclined to ruddiness upon exercise or from blushing, a habit he was much given to from excessive diffidence. His nose, long and thin, and his forehead, broad and angular, were his most characteristic features. Being an intense student, his mind appeared to be constantly preoccupied, and he seldom spoke to anyone unless he was spoken to, and then his voice was thin and feminine – almost squeaky – while his utterances were quick, jerky, and sententious, but when once made were there ended; there was no repetition or amending; no hypothesis or observation to lead to further observation. When a jocular remark occurred in his hearing he smiled as though he understood and enjoyed it, but never ventured comment to promote further mirth. There were occasions, as I observed, when his actions appeared strangely affected; as, for instance, when a drenching shower caught sections returning from recitations, of the shelter to the barracks, Jackson would continue his march, solemnly, at the usual pace, deviating neither to the right nor to the left. This, and other things like it, I saw him do time and time again, showing a design to it; but what that design was he alone appeared to know, for no one bothered themselves to discover it or did more than to remark, See Old Jackson!" He was never a cadet officer; he was too ungainly for that, or rather had nothing of that military élan about him to point him out for such preferment. He was, as Ephraim was, "like a cake unturned," which, I presume, was only the biblical way of saying he was a diamond in the rough.

Having such a great captain as Lee over him we are left in doubt as to what would have been his ability if himself in chief command. However much the southern mind may be divided as to whether Beauregard, or Joe Johnston or Lee were the greater of their generals, one thing is certain: they all unite in worshiping the memory of "Stonewall" Jackson, and the entire world joins them in admiration of his wonderful career.

Robert E. Lee

Tidball found himself among future Confederate heroes Robert E. Lee and J. E. B. Stuart during the suppression of John Brown's raid, in October 1859. He was, apparently, impressed with Lee:

He was then in the prime of mature manhood, being fifty-two years of age. With a fine masculine figure, perfect in every proportion, he had a handsome, manly face. Altogether, he was a perfect specimen of manhood. The dignity of his bearing, devoid as it was of all arrogance or affectation, arrested the attention of all who came within his influence. The affability of his manners made him approachable and agreeable under all conditions. He was exceedingly punctilious in points of etiquette, and I well recall that although we officers were quartered around in the buildings in the most inconvenient places, he took special pains to seek us all out and make a friendly call upon each one. His pleasing manners put everyone at ease, and his conversation was gentle and mild. Although scrupulously particular in dress and personal neatness, he had none of the airs of foppishness about him.

John B. Magruder

Tidball served with him in the Old Army, and said of Magruder's nickname "Prince John" that the moniker was "in consequence of his grandiose pretensions and his general qualities of affection":

In this sense he was indeed a remarkable man. It was with him an inborn trait cultivated to the highest degree. Even as a cadet at West Point it cropped forth and made him conspicuous, as a leader in the toney set. Being a lieutenant in the army, he at once branched forth, assuming all the dashing qualities that are supposed to be appropriate to one holding this position. His assurance made him a leader among his brother officers, and being perfectly reckless in money matters he laid tribute upon everyone that came under his influence, not simply by borrowing without ever repaying, but by his insinuating way of leading them into all matter of extravagance for the purpose of style and show. Entertainments were his strong point, and for this purpose he induces the officers of his regiment to contribute from the pitiful stipend they then received as pay to the purchases of a gorgeous set of regimental mess silver, and he introduced mess jackets of a showy pattern in which to dine.

Matthew Fontaine Maury

While assigned to the Coastal Survey office, Tidball had the delicate responsibility of dealing with Maury and his Naval Observatory as an outsider, subject to inter-service and inter-departmental rivalry:

Between Maury, superintendent of the Observatory, and [Alexander Dallas] Bache, Superintendent of the Coast Survey, an irrepressible conflict was growing as to how far seaward the Coast Survey should extend its works. Maury was reaping harvests of renown for the compilation of his wind and current charts and was beginning to feel that the entire Atlantic was his special reserve upon which he would not tolerate any poaching.

William Tecumseh Sherman

Tidball served as one of Sherman's aides-de-camp during Sherman's postwar term as general-in-chief of the U.S. Army. It is clear that Tidball greatly admired – almost worshiped – his commander:

General Sherman's name and fame being known throughout the civilized world, he was at all times a person of great interest to all, especially that swarm of people who, from far and near visit Washington City purely out of curiosity to see the sights to be found only in the nation's capital. He was one of those sights. …There was no form or ceremony in their coming or going. He did not hedge himself about with rules requiring such things nor did those about him endeavor to give importance to their positions by pretending to be his keeper. ...With strangers – in fact with all – he was noted for the directness of his questions, and this led at once to familiar conversation, in which he always took the lead, thus enabling him to soon discover all that was worthy of being known about his visitor. Seldom did anyone leave disappointed in his interview with him.

Among his visitors was a large sprinkling of veterans… He did not of course know, even by name, one out of a thousand of these men, but a pointed inquiry as to what organization his caller had belonged at once placed him in possession of all the facts necessary… His mind was a perfect cyclopedia as to organizations and the services they performed. Rattling along in his conversations he soon told the old soldier more of the part he had played in the war than he had ever known before. This of course won the heart(s) of the old veteran(s). There was no art or affectation in this...

To his lady visitors he was always gallant, yet never descending to fulsome compliments or nonsensical twaddle. Under no conditions did he resort to double entendres to feather his wit or to convey thoughts improper for open expression. He was exceedingly fond of the society of ladies, and took as much delight in dancing and such pleasures as a youth just entering manhood, and with them he was as much a lion as he was a hero with his old soldiers.

George H. Thomas

Tidball met Thomas during the early days of his career. As with Burnside, Tidball looked on the Mexican War veteran Thomas with the awe of a new recruit:

I was attracted to him by the fatherly interest he seemed to take in me, and got (from) him many hints that I found most sound and practical in my subsequent career as an officer. The quality of kindness which he possessed to such a high degree, I afterwards discovered was not strained in him, but was an endowment of his manly nature.

== Dates of rank ==
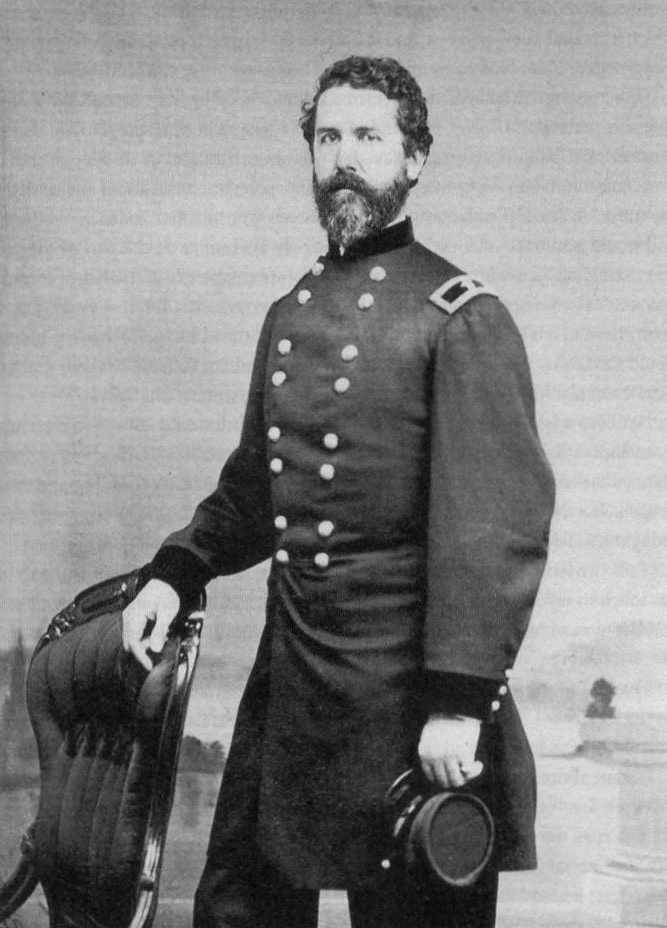
Brevet Brigadier General John C. Tidball, 1865. USMA Archives image

- Cadet, U.S. Military Academy, July 1, 1844
- Graduate (11th in the Class), U.S. Military Academy, July 1, 1848
- Brevet Second Lieutenant, U.S. Army, July 1, 1848
- Assigned to Battery E, 3rd U.S. Artillery
- Commissioned Second Lieutenant, U.S. Army, February 14, 1849
- Assigned to Battery M, 2nd U.S. Artillery
- First Lieutenant, Battery B, 2nd U.S. Artillery, March 31, 1853
- Captain, Battery A, 2nd U.S. Artillery, May 14, 1861
- Brevet Major, U.S. Army, June 27, 1862, for gallant and meritorious service during the battle of Gaines Mill
- Brevet Lieutenant Colonel, U.S. Army, September 17, 1862, for gallantry and meritorious service during the battle of Antietam
- Colonel, 4th New York Artillery (U.S. Volunteers), August 28, 1863
- Brevet Brigadier General, U.S. Volunteers, August 1, 1864, for gallantry and meritorious service during the battles of Po (at the Po River), Spotsylvania Court House, and Petersburg
- Brevet Colonel, U.S. Army, March 13, 1865, for gallantry and meritorious service during the battle of Fort Stedman
- Brevet Brigadier General, U.S. Army, March 13, 1865, for gallantry and meritorious service in the field during the Rebellion
- Brevet Major General, U.S. Volunteers, April 2, 1865, for gallantry and meritorious service during the battles of Ft. Stedman and Ft. Sedgwick
- Mustered out of U.S. Volunteers, September 26, 1865
- Major, 2nd U.S. Artillery, February 5, 1867
- Colonel of Staff, January 1, 1881 – February 8, 1884, while serving as aide-de-camp to General William T. Sherman
- Lieutenant Colonel, 3rd U.S. Artillery, June 30, 1882
- Colonel, 1st U.S. Artillery, March 2, 1885
- Retired, January 25, 1889

== See also ==
- List of American Civil War brevet generals (Union)
- Fort Randolph (Panama) (battery Tidball is named after him).
- Fort Tidball named after General John C. Tidball Kodiak Island, Alaska
