= John Haskell Calef =

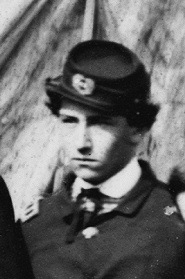
First Lieutenant John H. Calef, 1863. Library of Congress

John Haskell Calef (September 24, 1841 – January 4, 1912) was a career artillery officer in the United States Army, and a veteran of the American Civil War.

== Early and family life ==
Born in Gloucester, Massachusetts to John Church Calef and his wife, Eliza Baldwin Haskell, he had at least three older sisters and a brother. He attended the United States Military Academy and graduated 22nd in the Class of 1862.

He married Mary Matilda Newell in 1870 in San Joaquin, California, and they had children.

== Career ==
Commissioned into the 5th Regiment of Artillery upon graduation, Calef fought with it in the Peninsula Campaign and at Antietam. He transferred to Battery A, 2nd U.S. Artillery and the U.S. Horse Artillery Brigade in October 1862.

While in command of Battery A during the early summer of 1863, his three-inch rifles supported Buford on the first day of the Battle of Gettysburg. For his bravery during that battle and exemplary service during the war, Lieutenant Calef received brevet promotions to captain and major. Promoted to permanent first lieutenant on November 3, 1863, Calef also acted as the regimental adjutant of the 2nd Regiment of Artillery from November 1864 through March 1865.

After the war, Lt. Calef remained in the Regular Army. He was stationed for a considerable period at the Presidio of San Francisco in California and at Fort McHenry in Baltimore, Maryland. He turned down an offer for a promotion to captain that would have required him to transfer branches to the 10th U.S. Cavalry. The 10th Cavalry was (along with the 9th) a regiment formed of African-American troopers. Though Calef's reasons for turning down the promotion can only be speculated, many officers at the time considered accepting command of black troops a career-ending move. Calef remained with the Artillery branch and earned his captaincy with the 2nd U.S. Artillery, and also briefly served as an instructor at the Artillery School of Practice at Fort Monroe, in Hampton, Virginia. He was promoted successively to command the 1st Regiment of Artillery as colonel of the regiment.

== Later life ==
Lt. Col. Calef retired in August 1900. He taught military science at Saint Louis University from October 1903 to March 1906. Calef was advanced to colonel on the retired list in April 1904. He died of pneumonia in St. Louis, Missouri, on January 4, 1912, and was laid to rest at the Post Cemetery at the United States Military Academy in West Point, New York, on January 8, 1912.
