= 12th Coast Artillery (United States) =

12th Coast Artillery Regiment
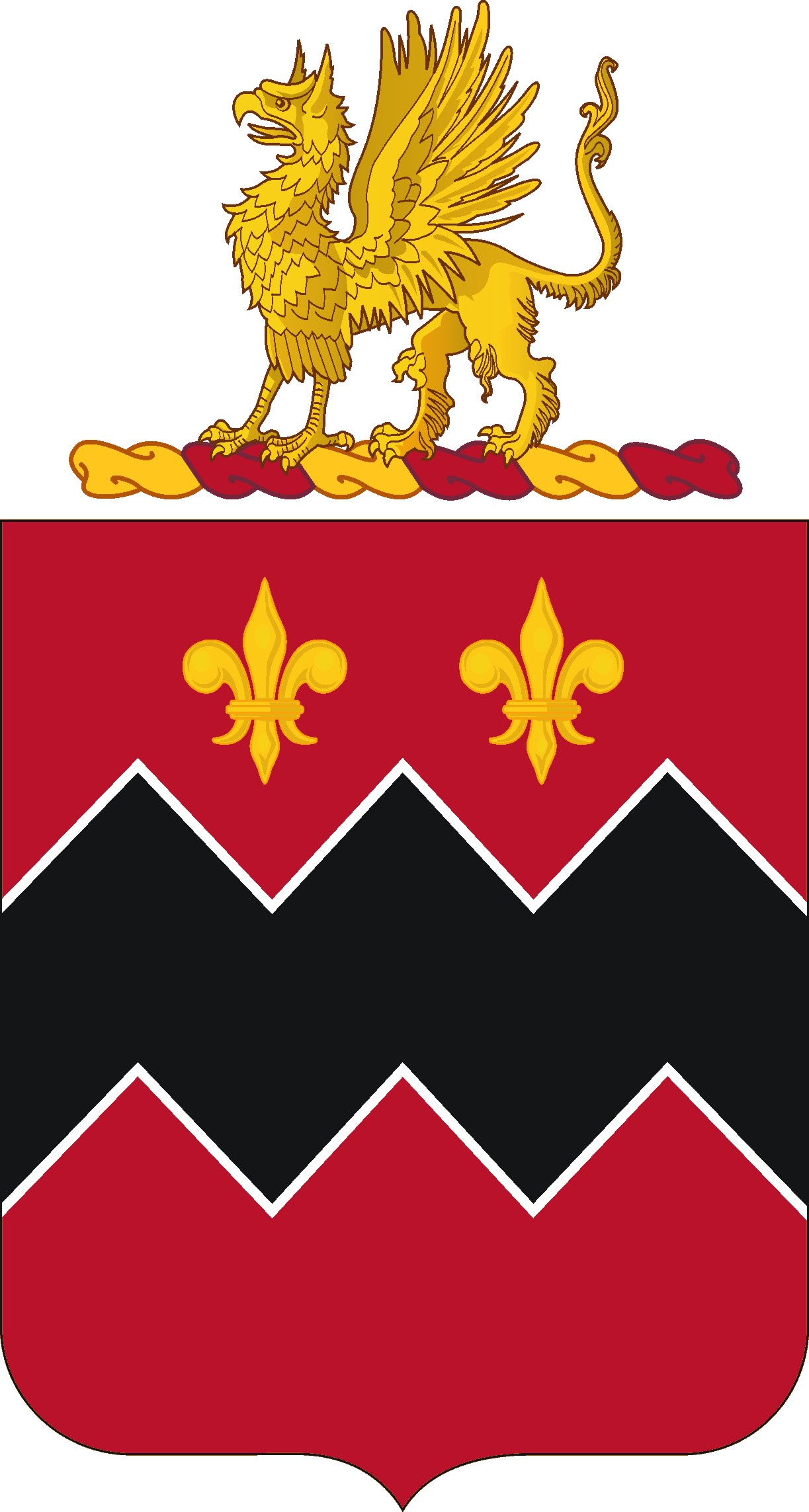
- Coat of arms
- Active: 1924–1932
- Country: United States
- Branch: Army
- Type: Coast artillery
- Role: Harbor defense
- Size: Regiment
- Part of: Harbor Defenses of the Chesapeake
- Garrison/HQ: Fort Monroe
- Motto(s): "Impiger et Animous"
- Mascot(s): Oozlefinch

The 12th Coast Artillery Regiment was a Coast Artillery regiment in the United States Army, constituted in the Regular Army on 27 February 1924. It served in the Harbor Defenses of the Chesapeake with headquarters at Fort Monroe, Virginia from 1924 to 1932. At that point, the regiment effectively became the 2nd Coast Artillery; on paper the 2nd Coast Artillery was transferred from the Harbor Defenses of Cristobal in the Panama Canal Zone and the 12th was transferred (less personnel and equipment) to that harbor defense. However, the 12th was never activated again, and on 19 June 1944 was disbanded.

== Lineage ==
Constituted in the Regular Army on 27 February 1924 as 12th Coast Artillery (Harbor Defense) (HD), and organized 1 July 1924 at Fort Monroe by redesignating the following companies of the Coast Artillery Corps (CAC): 112th, 58th, 139th, 158th, 164th, 103rd, 166th, and 169th.

- HHB and Batteries A, B, and C activated.
- on 25 November 1929 Battery A designated Mine Battery, Battery C designated Antiaircraft (AA) Battery.
- on departure of the 61st Coast Artillery (AA) from Fort Monroe in May 1930, the 12th was reorganized with two active antiaircraft batteries to perform duties as the Coast Artillery School's training and demonstration regiment.
- Regiment inactivated and transferred to Panama Canal Zone, less personnel and equipment, 29 April 1932. (personnel transferred to 2nd Coast Artillery to reactivate that regiment at Fort Monroe)
- Regiment allotted to Panama Canal Zone, but not activated in World War II. Regiment disbanded 14 June 1944.

== Distinctive unit insignia ==
- Description

A gold griffin statant wing wings elevated and addorsed within a red ring bearing the motto "IMPIGER ET ANIMOSUS" in gold. Due to the lack of artwork, tools, drawings and having no sample, we are unable to determine the exact design of the insignia.

- Symbolism

The griffin is a fictitious heraldic animal noted for watchfulness and strength, half eagle and half lion, and emphasizes the motto which translates to "Alert and Courageous."

- Background

The distinctive unit insignia was approved on 10 November 1924. It was rescinded on 14 March 1975.

== Coat of arms ==
- Blazon
  - Shield: Gules a fess dancette Sable fimbriated Argent in chief two fleurs-de-lis Or.
  - Crest: On a wreath of the colors Or and Gules, a griffin statant with wings elevated and addorsed Or. Motto: IMPIGER ET ANIMOSUS (Alert and Courageous).
- Symbolism
  - Shield: The shield is red for Artillery; the black fess dancette (zigzag figure) is taken from the shield of the Coast Defenses of Chesapeake Bay, and is edged in silver, as on the shield of the Coast Defenses of Chesapeake Bay. Two batteries, the 112th Company (Battery A, 60th Artillery, C.A.C.) now Headquarters Battery of this regiment, and the 158th Company (Headquarters and Service Battery, 1st Anti-Aircraft Battalion), now Battery C of this regiment, saw service in France. These two batteries are represented by the two fleur-de-lis (lilies).
  - Crest: The crest is the griffin, fictitious heraldic animal noted for watchfulness and strength, half eagle and half lion, also further emphasized in the motto "Alert and Courageous."
- Background: The coat of arms was approved on 1 November 1924. It was rescinded on 14 March 1975.

== See also ==
- Distinctive unit insignia (U.S. Army)
- Seacoast defense in the United States
- United States Army Coast Artillery Corps
- Harbor Defense Command
