= 2nd U.S. Artillery, Battery G =

2nd U.S. Light Artillery, Battery "G"
- Active: 1861 - 1865
- Country: United States
- Allegiance: Union
- Branch: Field Artillery Branch (United States)
- Engagements: First Battle of Bull Run; Siege of Yorktown; Battle of Williamsburg; Battle of Seven Pines; Seven Days Battles; Battle of Oak Grove; Battle of Glendale; Battle of Malvern Hill; Battle of Antietam; Battle of Fredericksburg; Battle of Chancellorsville; Battle of Gettysburg; Battle of Culpeper Court House; Bristoe Campaign; Mine Run Campaign; Battle of Spotsylvania Court House; Battle of North Anna; Battle of Totopotomoy Creek; Battle of Cold Harbor

Battery "G" 2nd Regiment of Artillery was a light artillery battery that served in the Union Army during the American Civil War.

== Service ==
The battery was stationed at Fort Mackinac, Mackinac Island, Michigan, in May 1861 when it was ordered to Washington, D.C., and attached to Davies' Brigade, Miles' Division, McDowell's Army of Northeastern Virginia, June to August 1861. Kearney's Brigade, Division of the Potomac, to October 1861. Artillery, Franklin's Division, Army of the Potomac, to January 1862. Artillery, Heintzelman's Division, Army of the Potomac, to March 1862. Artillery, 3rd Division, III Corps, Army of the Potomac, to August 1862. Artillery, 1st Division, IV Corps, Army of the Potomac, to September 1862. Artillery, 3rd Division, VI Corps, Army of the Potomac, to May 1863. Artillery Brigade, VI Corps, to August, 1863. 2nd Brigade, Horse Artillery, Army of the Potomac, to June 1864. 1st Brigade, DeRussy's Division, XXII Corps, Defenses of Washington, D.C., south of the Potomac, to August 1865.

== Detailed service ==
Advanced on Manassas, Virginia, July 16–21, 1861. Near Fairfax Court House July 17. Battle of Bull Run July 21. Duty in the defenses of Washington until March 1862. Moved to the Virginia Peninsula. Siege of Yorktown April 5 – May 4. Near Williamsburg May 4. Battle of Williamsburg May 5. Battle of Fair Oaks, Seven Pines, May 31 – June 1. Seven Days Battles before Richmond June 25 – July 1. Oak Grove June 25. Glendale June 30. Malvern Hill July 1. At Harrison's Landing until August 16. Moved to Alexandria, Virginia, August 16–24. Maryland Campaign September 6–22. Battle of Antietam September 16–17. Movement to Falmouth, Virginia, October 30-November 19. Battle of Fredericksburg, Virginia, December 12–15. "Mud March" January 20–24, 1863. At Falmouth until April. Chancellorsville Campaign April 27 – May 6. Operations at Franklin's Crossing April 29 – May 2. Battle of Maryes Heights, Fredericksburg, May 3. Salem Heights May 3–4. Battle of Gettysburg July 1–3. Advance from the Rappahannock to the Rapidan September 13–17. Culpeper Court House September 13. Bristoe Campaign October 9–22. Advance to line of the Rappahannock November 7–8. Mine Run Campaign November 26-December 2. New Hope Church November 27. Demonstration on the Rapidan February 6–7, 1864. Barnett's Ford February 6–7. Rapidan Campaign May 4 – June 2. Wilderness May 5–7. Spotsylvania Court House May 8–21. North Anna River May 23–26. On line of the Pamunkey May 26–28. Totopotomoy May 28–31. Cold Harbor May 31 – June 2. Dismounted June 2 and ordered to Washington, D.C. Duty in the defenses of that city until August 1865.

== Commanders ==
- Captain James Thompson – severely wounded in action at the Battle of Culpeper Court House
- 1st Lieutenant Oliver Duff Greene – succeeded by Cpt Thompson in March 1862
- 1st Lieutenant John H. Butler – succeeded Cpt Thompson in November 1863
- 1st Lieutenant William Neil Dennison – succeeded Lt Butler in June 1865

== See also ==
- List of United States Regular Army Civil War units
- 2nd Air Defense Artillery Regiment
