= James Duncan (United States Army officer) =

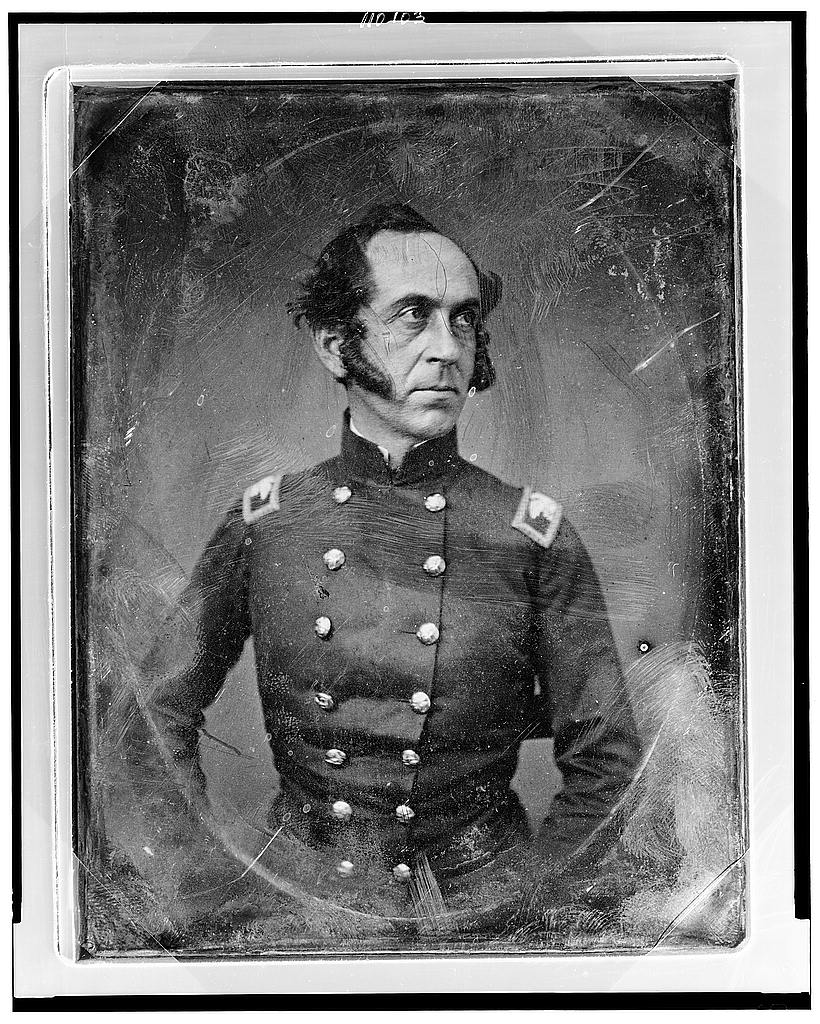
- James Duncan
- Born: September 29, 1811; Cold Spring, New York
- Died: July 3, 1849 (aged 37); Mobile, Alabama
- Military career
- Allegiance: United States
- Branch: United States Army
- Service years: 1834–1849
- Rank: Colonel
- Conflicts: Second Seminole War; Mexican–American War; Battle of Palo Alto (1846); Battle of Resaca de la Palma (1846); Battle of Monterrey (1846); Siege of Vera Cruz (1847); Battle of Cerro Gordo (1847); Battle of Churubusco (1847); Battle of Molino del Rey (1847); Battle of Chapultepec (1847)

James Duncan (September 29, 1811 – July 3, 1849) became a hero of the Mexican–American War for his capable command of an artillery battery at several important battles. He was a graduate of United States Military Academy in 1834 and served in the Seminole Wars. In 1848, he became involved in a post-war squabble between several general officers, though it did not harm his prospects. After his exploits in the Mexican–American War, he was appointed Inspector general of the US Army. A promising career was cut short when he died of yellow fever on an inspection tour of Mobile, Alabama in 1849.

== Early career ==
James Duncan was born on September 29, 1811, at Philipstown, New York. He became a cadet at the United States Military Academy at West Point, New York on January 1, 1831, and graduated on July 1, 1834, as a brevet second lieutenant in the 2nd Artillery Regiment. He was posted to the garrison of Savannah, Georgia in 1834–35. He became a full second lieutenant on November 17, 1834. He taught mathematics as an assistant professor from February 14 to April 7, 1835. He fought in the Second Seminole War in 1835–36. He fought in skirmishes on February 27–29, 1836 near Camp Izard where he was wounded. He also fought at Oloklikaha on March 31 the same year.

On November 30, 1836, he was promoted to first lieutenant. In 1836–37, he transferred to Fort Trumbull in Connecticut where he was placed in charge of public property. In 1838 he again served in the Second Seminole War before helping to supervise the Cherokee removal, part of the Trail of Tears. He was posted to northern frontier during the Canada border disturbances and then to Cleveland, Ohio. He was posted to Buffalo, New York in 1838–39. He went to a camp of instruction at Trenton, New Jersey in 1839. He was at Buffalo again in 1839–41, helping to police Canada border disturbances. He transferred to Fort Hamilton in New York in 1841–42, Fort Adams in Rhode Island in 1842–43, and back to Fort Hamilton in 1843–45.

== Mexican–American War ==
=== Early successes ===
In 1841 an artillery system emerged where the M1841 6-pounder field gun and the M1841 12-pounder howitzer were adopted as light artillery. At the start of the Mexican–American War, the US Army maintained four artillery regiments, each with 10 companies of 50 men each. However, there were only four highly trained light artillery batteries: Duncan's Company A, 2nd Artillery Regiment, Samuel Ringgold's Company C, 3rd Artillery, Braxton Bragg's Company E, 3rd Artillery, and John M. Washington's Company B, 4th Artillery. The first three were assigned to Zachary Taylor's army from the start, while Washington joined Taylor later. The standard mixed light artillery battery included four 6-pounder field guns and two 12-pounder howitzers.

Duncan joined Taylor's army in the military occupation Texas in 1845–46. On July 31 1845, the first echelon of Taylor's army landed at Corpus Christi, Texas. After months in camp, the first elements of the American army set out for Port Isabel, Texas which would serve as the forward base. Duncan's promotion to captain came through on April 16, 1846.

On May 8, 1846, Taylor's army met the Mexican army of Mariano Arista in the Battle of Palo Alto. Duncan's battery was posted on the American left flank while Ringgold's battery was on the right. In the center stood two heavy 18-pounder cannons. Opposing the 2,228 Americans were 3,826 Mexicans with two 8-pounders and at least six 4-pounders. Duncan's and Ringgold's batteries deployed 100 yd (91 m) in front of the American infantry line and about 700 yd (640 m) from the Mexican defenders. Though many rounds overshot their targets, the effect of the American artillery fire was murderous. Meanwhile, the U.S. infantrymen were largely spectators to the artillery duel. Late in the afternoon, the Mexicans launched an infantry and cavalry attack against the American left wing, but it was repulsed by Duncan's battery. Though the battle ended inconclusively, the Americans lost only five killed, 43 wounded, and two missing. Ten more later died of their wounds including Ringgold who was struck in both legs by a 4-pounder shot. Arista reported 102 killed in his official report, but privately admitted losing 252 men killed.

After finding the Mexican army gone the next morning, Taylor held a council of war in which seven of ten officers voted to wait for reinforcements, Taylor brushed their objections aside and ordered the army to advance. According to one account, Duncan was one of the three officers voting to advance. In another account, Taylor encountered Duncan who remarked, "General, we whipped them yesterday and we can whip them again". Unknown to the Americans, the Mexican soldiers were demoralized by their heavy casualties. In the Battle of Resaca de la Palma on May 9, the Americans routed the Mexican army. The Americans sustained losses of 34 killed and 113 wounded, but Mexican casualties were much heavier and included seven artillery pieces. Duncan was breveted major for "gallant conduct" at Palo Alto and breveted lieutenant colonel for "gallant and highly distinguished conduct" at Resaca de la Palma.

=== Invasion of Mexico ===
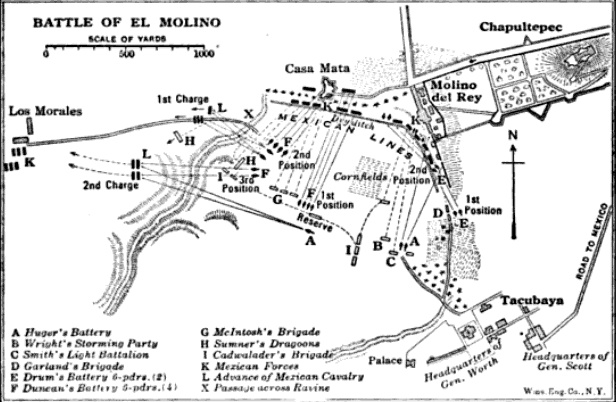
Battle of Molino del Rey map shows the three positions (F) assumed by Duncan's battery.

During the Battle of Monterrey on September 21-24, 1846, Duncan's battery was assigned to Thomas Staniford's brigade in William J. Worth's division. Taylor attacked the city from the north, while sending Worth's troops to attack from the west. The batteries of Duncan and William W. Mackall were involved in the capture of the Bishop's Palace on September 22. Duncan was breveted colonel for "gallant and meritorious conduct" at Monterrey. In early January 1847, Taylor was ordered to transfer Worth's and Twiggs's divisions and two batteries, including Duncan's, to the army of Winfield Scott. Duncan fought at the Siege of Veracruz on March 9–29, 1847, at the Battle of Cerro Gordo on April 17–18, and at a skirmish in Amazoque on May 14.

Scott's army was organized into four divisions, with Duncan's battery in Worth's 1st Division. As the American army approached Mexico City from the east, Scott ordered Worth to reconnoiter a road that would lead the Americans to attack from the south. Worth gave the task to Duncan who reported the road, "not easily obstructed or defended". Soon Scott's entire army moved by that route. At the Battle of Churubusco on August 20, 1847, Newman S. Clarke's brigade, George Cadwalader's brigade, and Duncan's battery captured the tête de pont, a strongpoint defended by a superior force. They then helped capture the San Mateo Convent.

After a two-week truce, the Battle of Molino del Rey was fought on September 8, 1847. Underestimating the strength of the Mexican position, Scott assigned the task of capturing the Molino to Worth's reinforced division, a total of 3,500 men. Worth's soldiers were guided into position by Duncan and James Mason, who had reconnoitered the area. Worth deployed John Garland's brigade and Benjamin Huger's battery on the right, facing the Molino. Worth posted Clarke's brigade and Edwin Vose Sumner's 270 dragoons on the left, facing the Casa Mata fortification. Duncan's battery took position in the center and Cadwalader's brigade was in reserve. The initial American assault was repulsed with serious losses, but Garland's troops eventually overran the Molino. Meanwhile, the Mexican defenders of the Casa Mata drove back Clarke's brigade. A force of Mexican cavalry and infantry appeared to the west, but it was driven off by the fire of Duncan's guns and pursued by Sumner's dragoons. The Casa Mata repelled a second assault, but its defenders finally fled after a sustained bombardment by Duncan's battery.

Duncan fought during the Battle of Chapultepec on September 13, 1847, and during the subsequent capture of the Belén and San Cosme gates on September 13–14. During the occupation of the Mexican capital, a quarrel occurred between the American generals. Gideon Pillow, one of the U.S. division commanders, published an article that appeared in the New Orleans Delta and Picayune newspapers under the pseudonym "Leonidas". The letter claimed Pillow was responsible for the American victories while Scott was mostly a bystander. Everyone immediately guessed that Pillow was the author. On October 23, the Pittsburgh Post published a letter claiming that Worth and Duncan saved Scott from a blunder by convincing the commander-in-chief to use the southern approach to Mexico City. Actually, Duncan wrote a letter to a friend and this was the basis for the Pittsburgh letter. Duncan later took credit for the letter. This was followed by a second letter praising Pillow in glowing terms. At first, Scott tolerated Pillow's unruly behavior, but he finally had enough and brought charges of insubordination against Pillow, Worth, and Duncan.

== Post-war ==
The Treaty of Guadalupe Hidalgo was signed on February 2, 1848, and Scott was recalled soon afterward, leaving Mexico in April. The court of inquiry was begun in Mexico City but was later transferred to Frederick, Maryland where Pillow was eventually acquitted. Duncan's reputation was not damaged. President James K. Polk appointed him full colonel inspector general on January 26, 1849. While inspecting troops in Mobile, Alabama, Duncan caught yellow fever and died on July 3, 1849. On March 27, 1849, Captain Sidney Burbank established Fort Duncan at Eagle Pass, Texas. Named after Duncan, it was used intermittently by the U.S. Army until sold to the city of Eagle Pass in 1938.
