= William Farquhar Barry =

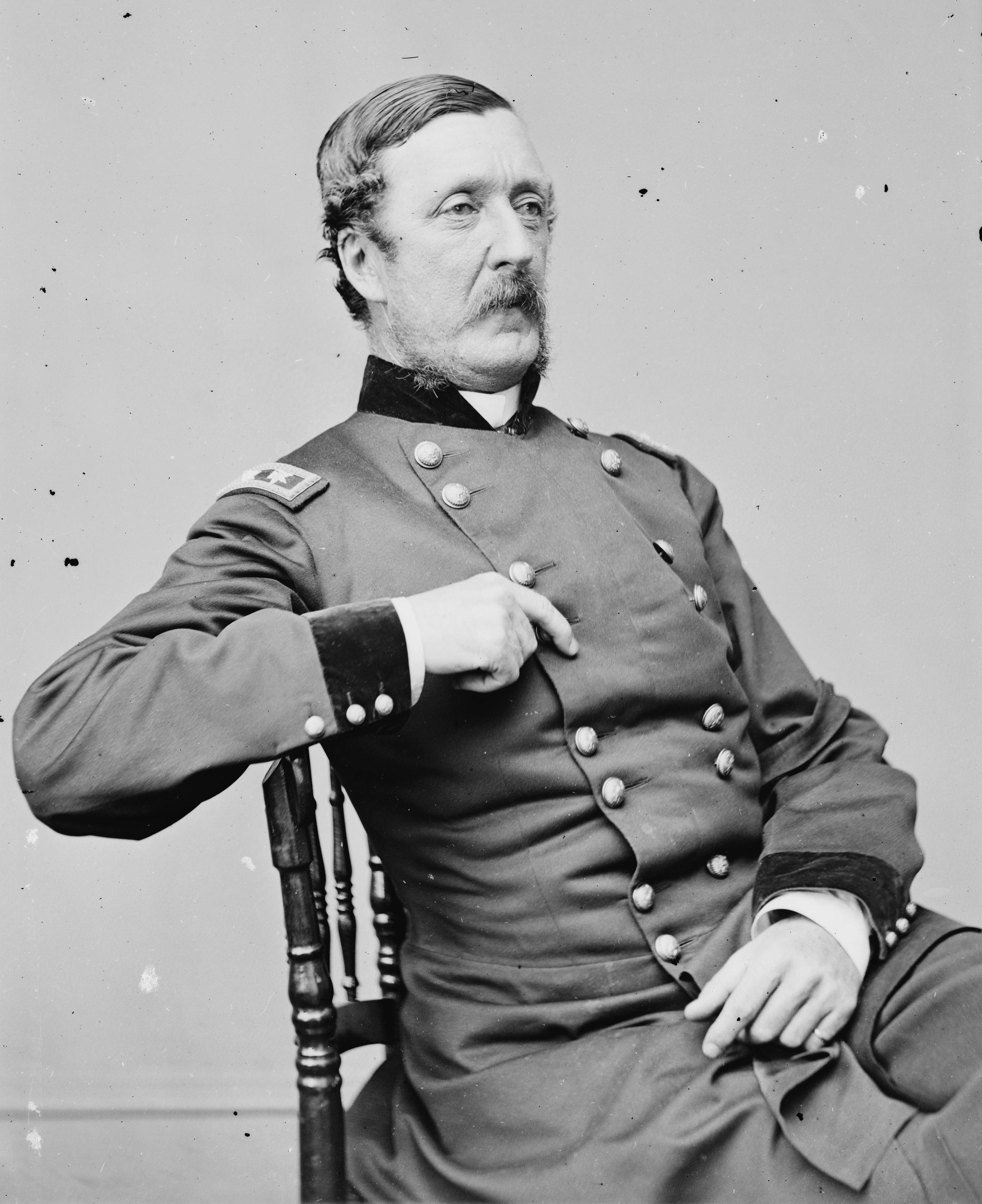
- William Farquhar Barry
- Born: August 18, 1818; New York City
- Died: July 18, 1879 (aged 60); Baltimore, Maryland
- Burial place: Forest Lawn Cemetery, Buffalo, New York
- Military career
- Allegiance: United States; Union
- Branch: United States Army; Union Army
- Service years: 1838–1879
- Rank: Brigadier General; Brevet Major General
- Conflicts: Mexican–American War; Seminole Wars; American Civil War

William Farquhar Barry (August 18, 1818 – July 18, 1879) was a career officer in the United States Army, serving as an artillery commander during the Mexican–American War and Civil War.

== Birth and prewar career ==
Born in New York City, Barry was appointed to the United States Military Academy in 1834, and graduated in 1838, 17th in his class of 45 cadets. He was commissioned a brevet second lieutenant in the 4th U.S. Artillery, transferring to the 2nd U.S. Artillery a few weeks later. He was stationed near the Canada–US border, then later took part in the Mexican–American, Seminole, and the Kansas-Missouri Border Wars.

== Military career during the Civil War ==
In April 1861, the War Department dispatched Captain Barry to help organize the artillery defenses at Fort Pickens, Florida, against the Rebel threat in nearby Pensacola. Barry was promoted to major of artillery in May 1861. He remained at Fort Pickens until he was transferred to Virginia. Barry was appointed chief of artillery for the Army of the Potomac under Brig. Gen. Irvin McDowell. During the First Battle of Bull Run, Barry's position was overrun after mistaking advancing Confederates for retreating Union forces. Barry was appointed brigadier general by President Abraham Lincoln on August 20, 1861, to rank from August 20, 1861. The appointment was subsequently confirmed by the United States Senate on 17 March 1862.

As chief of artillery under Maj. Gen. George B. McClellan, Barry organized ordnance for the Army of the Potomac and, during the Peninsula Campaign, later took part in the battles of Yorktown, Mechanicsville, Gaines' Mill, White Oak Swamp, and Malvern Hill. After later supervising forts and ordnance surrounding Washington, D.C., Barry became chief of artillery under Maj. Gen. William T. Sherman, serving with him in Tennessee, the March to the Sea, and the Carolinas campaign. On January 23, 1865, President Lincoln nominated Barry for appointment to the brevet grade of major general of volunteers, to rank from September 1, 1864, for his service in the Atlanta campaign, and the U.S. Senate confirmed the appointment on February 14, 1865. Barry was mustered out of the volunteer force on January 15, 1866. On July 17, 1866, President Andrew Johnson nominated Barry for appointment to the brevet grade of major general in the Regular Army, to rank from March 13, 1865, and the U.S. Senate confirmed the appointment on July 23, 1866.

On December 11, 1865, Barry was appointed colonel in the 2nd U.S. Artillery and was in command of the northern frontier during the Fenian raids of 1866. He served there until September 1867, and then commanded the artillery school of practice at Fort Monroe until March 1877, when he was appointed to the command at Fort McHenry, Baltimore, Maryland. During the labor riots of 1877 he rendered valuable service at Camden Station.

He was the co-author of Instruction for Field Artillery (1860), along with William H. French and Henry J. Hunt.

Barry died at Fort McHenry and is buried at Forest Lawn Cemetery in Buffalo, New York.

== See also ==
- List of American Civil War generals (Union)
