= Fair Oaks, Henrico County, Virginia =

Unincorporated community in Virginia, United States

Coordinates: 37°31′51″N 77°18′58″W

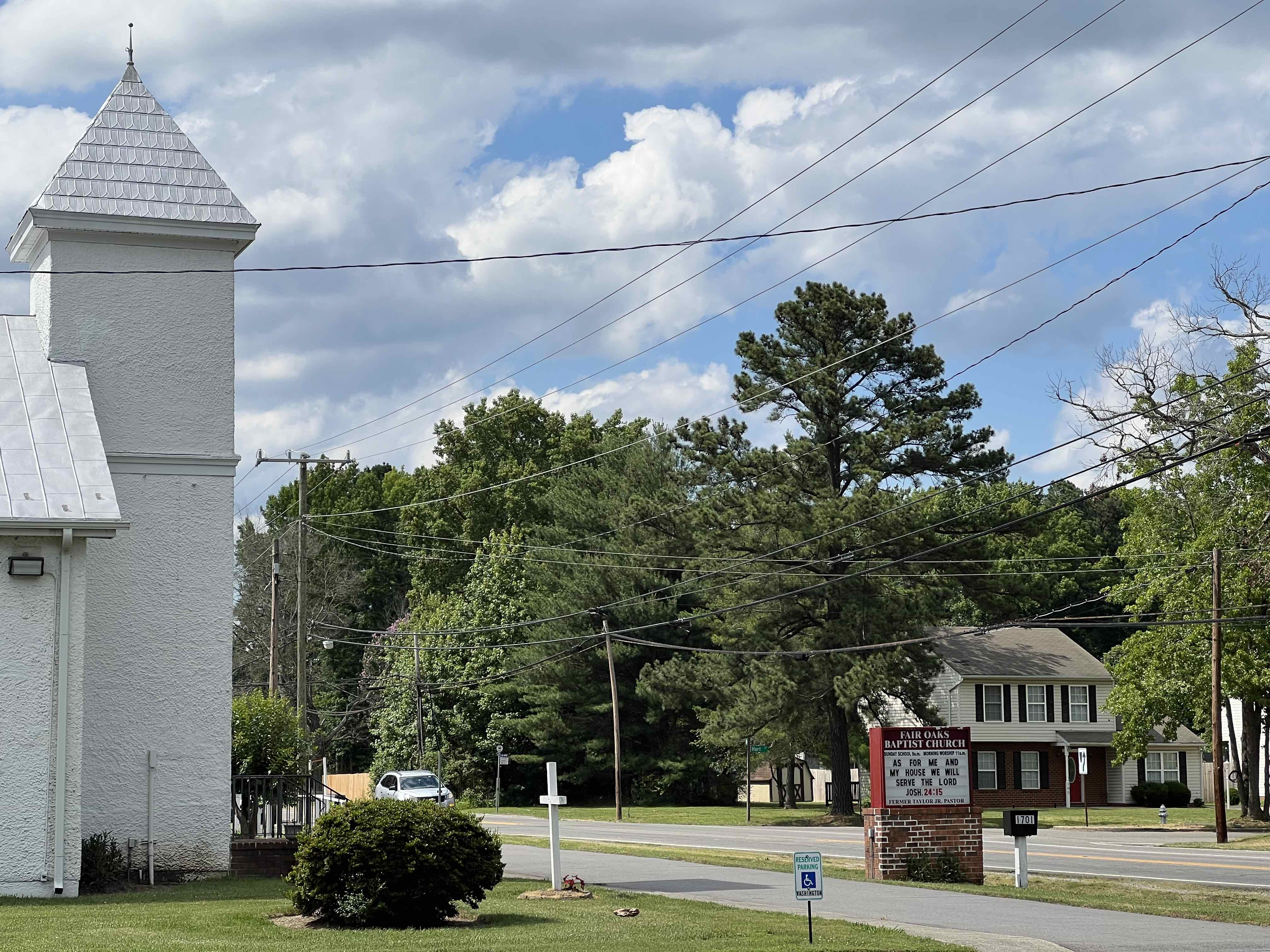
Fair Oaks Baptist Church.

Fair Oaks is an unincorporated community located in Henrico County, Virginia, United States. Fair Oaks Station was located on the Richmond and York River Railroad and played a role in the Peninsula Campaign in 1862 during the American Civil War. A major battle was fought nearby, known variously as the Battle of Fair Oaks or the Battle of Seven Pines.
