= 2nd Air Defense Artillery Regiment =

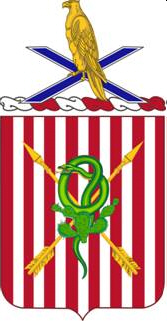
- Active: 1821
- Country: United States
- Branch: Army
- Type: Air defense artillery
- Motto: Fidus Ultra Finem (Faithful Beyond the End)
- Engagements: War of 1812; Indian Wars; Mexican War; American Civil War; World War II; Vietnam War; Southwest Asia
- Decorations: Meritorious Unit Commendation Air and Space Outstanding Unit Award

Commanders
- Notable commanders: Brevet Lieutenant Colonel John Trout Greble; Lieutenant Robert Allen; Major Lewis G. Arnold; Colonel Romeyn B. Ayres

Insignia
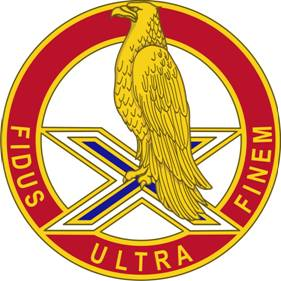
- Distinctive unit insignia

The 2nd Air Defense Artillery Regiment is an air defense artillery regiment of the United States Army, first formed in 1821 as a field artillery unit.

Battery A-2nd ADAR THAAD (Battery A, 2nd Air Defense Artillery Regiment, Terminal High Altitude Area Defense) of the 11th Air Defense Artillery (ADA) Brigade successfully intercepted an Intermediate Range Ballistic Missile which was launched near Hawaii on 11 July 2017. The soldiers used the procedures of an actual combat scenario at the Pacific Spaceport on Kodiak Island, Alaska, and were not aware of the IRBM's launch time.

On 19 October 2017, Battery D-2 ADAR THAAD (Delta Battery, 2nd Air Defense Artillery Regiment) reflagged from the 11th ADA Brigade to the 35th ADA Brigade prior to the permanent change of station from Fort Bliss to South Korea.

== Lineage ==
Constituted 1 June 1821 in the Regular Army as the 2nd Regiment of Artillery and organized from existing units with headquarters at Baltimore, Maryland. The lineages of some of the units that initially made up the 2nd U.S. Artillery include campaign credit for the War of 1812.

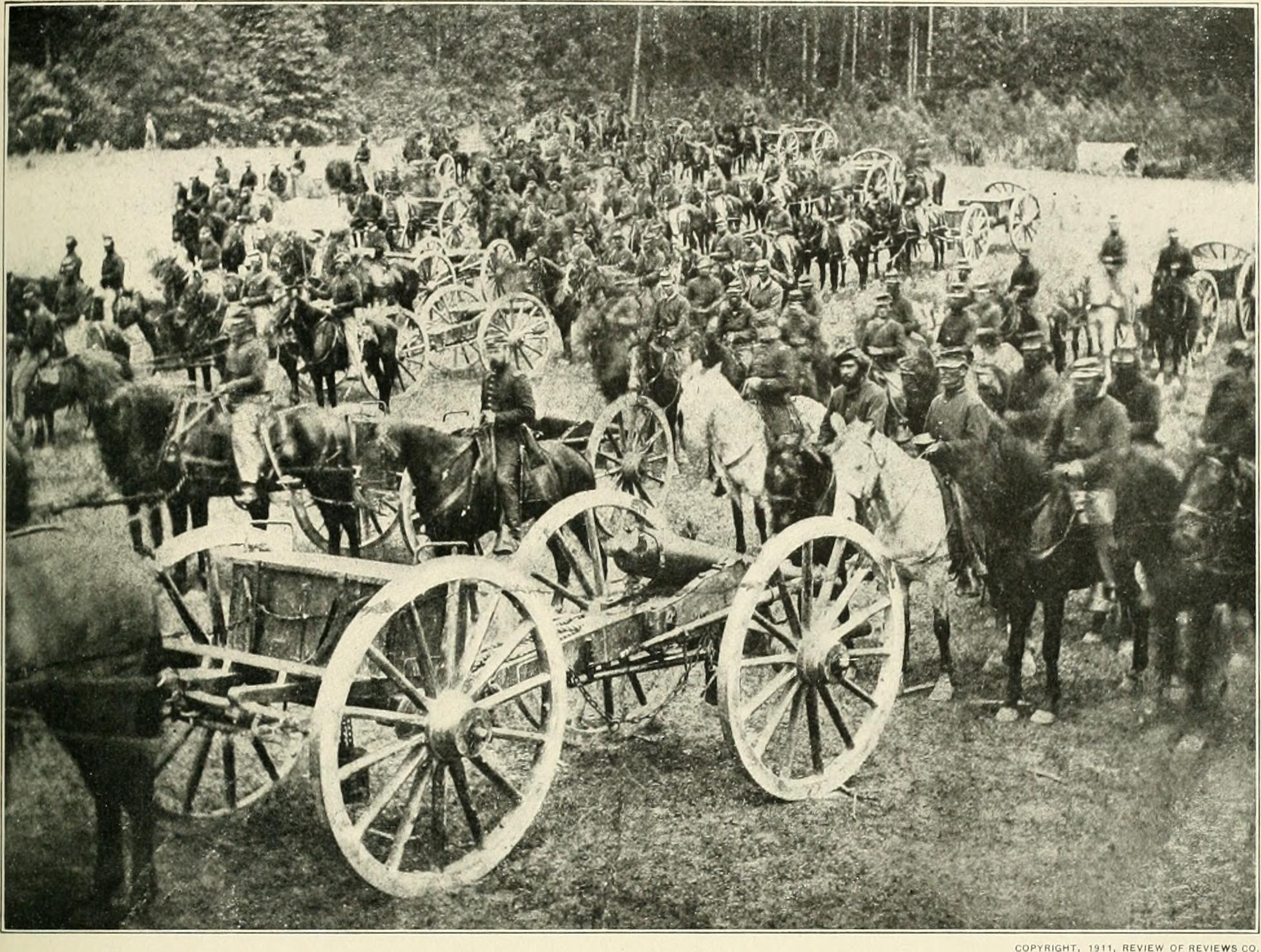
Battery A, 2nd U.S. Artillery and Batteries C&G (combined), 3rd U.S. Artillery near Fair Oaks, Virginia, June 1862. These were all horse artillery units at the time.

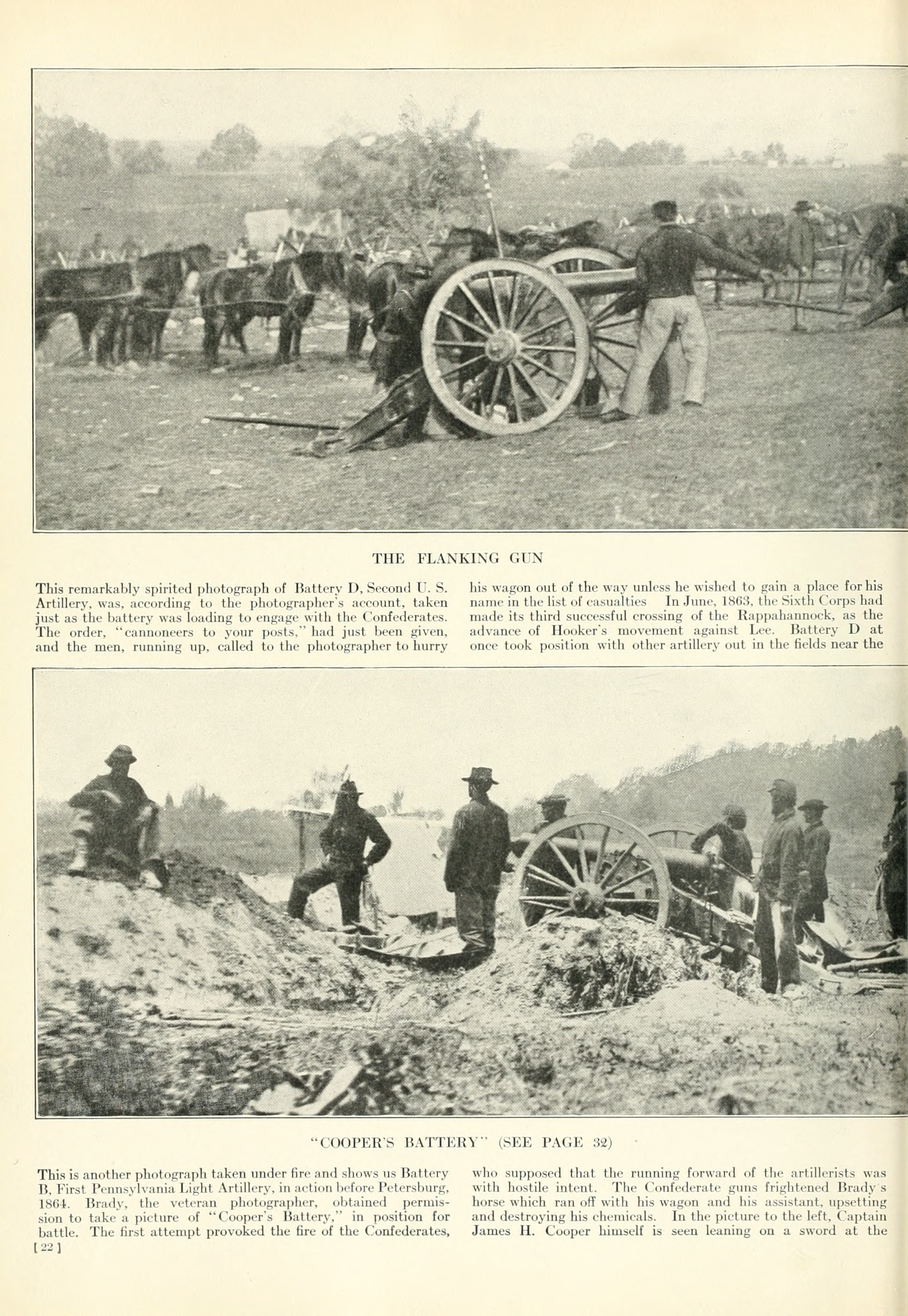
Top left: BAttery D 2d US Artillery Regiment

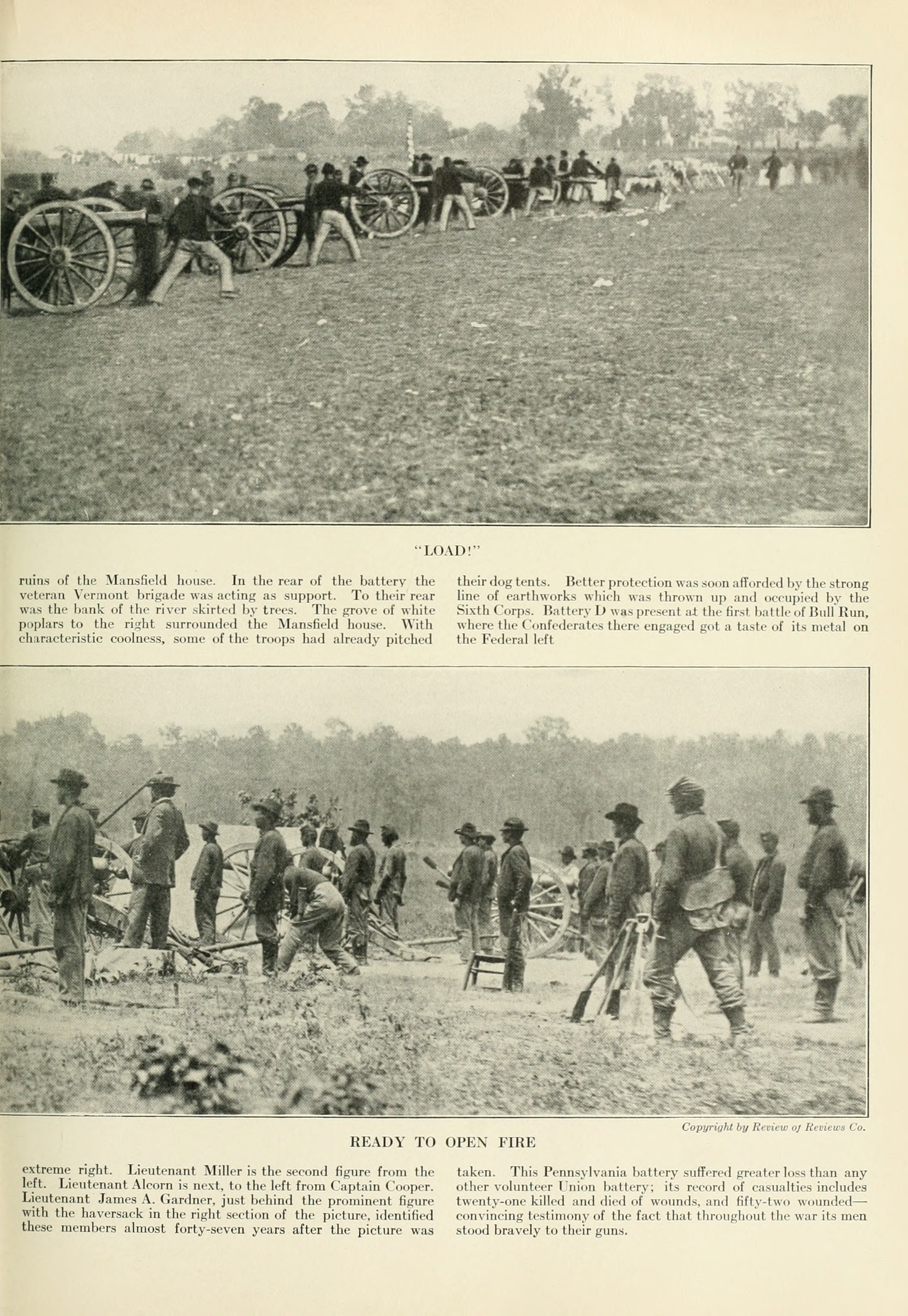
Top right: BAttery D 2d US Artillery Regiment

The 2nd U.S. Artillery took part with distinction in the Mexican War, with Captain James Duncan receiving three brevets–major, lieutenant-colonel, and colonel—for his actions in the war.

Twelve batteries of the 2nd US Artillery served throughout the American Civil War, and Battery M fired the first shot of the Union Army at the First Battle of Bull Run. At the time, the battery was commanded by 2LT Peter Conover Hains, who later became the last veteran of the Civil War to serve on active duty, being recalled from retirement with the outbreak of the First World War to serve as commander of the Eastern District of the Corps of Engineers from 1917 to 1918. Hains had retired originally in 1904 as a brigadier general of the Corps of Engineers, and in 1916 was promoted to major general on the retired list.

Order of battle information shows that batteries of the regiment deployed outside the U.S. in the Spanish–American War of 1898. However, no battle honors for this war are on the regiment's official lineage and honors certificate dated 29 November 1996. Batteries A and F deployed to Cuba.

Regiment was broken up on 13 February 1901, and its elements reorganized and redesignated as separate numbered companies and batteries of the Artillery Corps.

Reconstituted 1 July 1924 in the Regular Army as the 2nd Coast Artillery at Fort Sherman in the Harbor Defenses of Cristobal on the Caribbean side of the Panama Canal. Batteries E, G, and H concurrently reorganized and redesignated from existing units in the Panama Canal Zone. The regiment was organized by redesignating the 13th, 14th, 15th, 16th, 18th, 19th, 20th, 21st, 22nd, 23rd, and 24th companies of the Coast Artillery Corps (CAC). Batteries B, C, D, E, H, I, K, and L carried the lineage and designations of the corresponding batteries in the old 2nd Artillery. 1st, 2nd, and 3rd Battalions and Batteries E, G, and H were activated with the regiment.

4th Battalion constituted 22 April 1929 as an inactive component, never activated. Battery C activated 30 April 1926 in the Canal Zone; Battery G concurrently inactivated in the Canal Zone. 1st, 2nd, and 3rd Battalions and Batteries C, E, and H inactivated 15 April 1932 in the Canal Zone and transferred, less personnel and equipment, to Fort Monroe, Virginia.

Regimental headquarters and Batteries C, E, and H activated 30 April 1932 at Fort Monroe, Virginia in the Harbor Defenses of Chesapeake Bay with personnel from inactivated 12th Coast Artillery. Battery E was activated at Fort Story, Virginia.

The 2nd Coast Artillery provided training support for the Coast Artillery School at Fort Monroe, 1932–41. The regiment trained the Organized Reserve harbor defense units assigned to the Harbor Defenses of Chesapeake Bay 1932–41. Reserve officers assigned to the regiment conducted summer training with the regiment at Fort Monroe. Responsible for the support and administration of the Civilian Conservation Corps (CCC) District 4, Third Corps Area, 1933–39.

Battery A activated 1 September 1935 at Fort Monroe; Battery H concurrently inactivated at Fort Monroe. Batteries B and D activated 1 November 1938 at Fort Monroe. Battery F activated 1 February 1940 at Fort Monroe. Remainder of 1st and 2nd Battalions activated 1 August 1940 at Fort Monroe as a Type B harbor defense regiment. Battery G activated 1 March 1941 at Fort Monroe. Regiment upgraded to Type A in 1941. Remainder of regiment including 3rd Battalion activated 30 April 1942 at Fort Monroe).

Battery K activated at Fort Moultrie, South Carolina with personnel and equipment of Battery D, 263rd Coast Artillery. Battery H sent to Fort Macon, North Carolina July 1942.

In September, Battery K and one platoon from Battery N were assigned to Fort Macon.

In 1942 batteries from 2nd Battalion posted at Forts Moultrie, Monroe, & Macon, and at Little Creek Mine Base, VA.

Regiment changed from Type A to Type C 21 April 1942.

Batteries at Temporary Harbor Defenses of Beaufort manned the 5-inch gun battery on Cape Lookout and Fort Macon's 6-inch guns.

Regiment broken up 1 October 1944 and its elements reorganized and redesignated as follows:

Headquarters and Headquarters Battery and Batteries A, B, C, G, H, and I as the 2nd Coast Artillery Battalion (2nd Coast Artillery Battalion inactivated 1 April 1945 at Little Creek Mine Base, Virginia; activated 1 August 1946 at Fort Winfield Scott, California; inactivated 25 November 1946 at Fort Winfield Scott, California).
Batteries D, E, and F as elements of the 175th Coast Artillery Battalion (inactivated 1 April 1945 at Fort Story, Virginia).

Former elements of the 2nd Coast Artillery reconstituted and/or consolidated 28 June 1950 to form the following units:

Headquarters and Headquarters Detachment, 2nd Coast Artillery Battalion, consolidated with Headquarters Battery, 2nd Antiaircraft Artillery Group (see ANNEX 1), and consolidated unit designated as Headquarters and Headquarters Battery, 2nd Antiaircraft Artillery Group.
Headquarters and Headquarters Battery, 1st Battalion, 2nd Coast Artillery, reconstituted in the Regular Army and redesignated as Headquarters and Headquarters Battery, 2nd Antiaircraft Artillery Battalion; concurrently Battery A, Harbor Defenses of Chesapeake Bay (formerly Battery A, 2nd Coast Artillery Battalion), Batteries B and C, 2nd Coast Artillery Battalion, and Battery F, Harbor Defenses of Chesapeake Bay (formerly Battery A, 175th Coast Artillery Battalion), redesignated as Batteries A, B, C, and D, 2nd Antiaircraft Artillery Battalion, respectively.
Headquarters and Headquarters Battery, 2nd Battalion, 2nd Coast Artillery, reconstituted in the Regular Army and redesignated as Headquarters and Headquarters Battery, 12th Antiaircraft Artillery Battalion; concurrently Batteries B, C, D, and E, Harbor Defenses of Chesapeake Bay (formerly Batteries E, F, G, and H, 2nd Coast Artillery), redesignated as Batteries A, B, C, and D, 12th Antiaircraft Artillery Battalion, respectively; battalion concurrently consolidated with the 136th Antiaircraft Artillery Gun Battalion (see ANNEX 2), and consolidated unit designated as the 12th Antiaircraft Artillery Battalion.
Headquarters and Headquarters Battery, 3rd Battalion, 2nd Coast Artillery, reconstituted in the Regular Army; concurrently consolidated with Battery F, 2nd Coast Artillery Battalion, Battery E, 175th Coast Artillery Battalion, and the 42nd Antiaircraft Artillery Automatic Weapons Battalion (active) (see ANNEX 3), and consolidated unit designated as the 42nd Antiaircraft Artillery Automatic Weapons Battalion, an element of the 9th Infantry Division.

After 28 June 1950 the above units underwent changes as follows:

Headquarters and Headquarters Battery, 2nd Antiaircraft Artillery Group, activated 10 June 1951 at Camp Edwards, Massachusetts.
Reorganized and redesignated 20 March 1958 as Headquarters and Headquarters Battery, 2nd Artillery Group.
Inactivated 15 December 1961 at Lockport Air Force Station, New York.
2d Antiaircraft Artillery Battalion redesignated 27 February 1951 as the 2nd Antiaircraft Artillery Automatic Weapons Battalion and assigned to the 1st Armored Division.
Activated 7 March 1951 at Fort Bliss, Texas.
Consolidated 20 March 1951 with the 434th Antiaircraft Artillery Automatic Weapons Battalion (see ANNEX 4), and consolidated unit designated as the 2nd Antiaircraft Artillery Automatic Weapons Battalion.
Redesignated 20 May 1953 as the 2nd Antiaircraft Artillery Battalion.
Inactivated 15 February 1957 at Fort Polk, Louisiana, and relieved from assignment to the 1st Armored Division.
12th Antiaircraft Artillery Battalion redesignated 13 March 1952 as the 12th Antiaircraft Artillery Gun Battalion.
Activated 8 April 1952 at Fort Hancock, New Jersey.
Redesignated 15 May 1953 as the 12th Antiaircraft Artillery Battalion.
Inactivated 20 December 1957 at New York, New York.
42nd Antiaircraft Artillery Automatic Weapons Battalion redesignated 25 May 1954 as the 42nd Antiaircraft Artillery Battalion.
Inactivated 1 December 1957 at Fort Carson, Colorado, and relieved from assignment to the 9th Infantry Division. Headquarters and Headquarters Battery, 2nd Artillery Group; 2nd, 12th, and 42nd Antiaircraft Artillery Battalions; and the 2nd Field Artillery Battalion (organized in 1907) consolidated, reorganized, and redesignated 15 December 1961 as the 2nd Artillery, a parent regiment under the Combat Arms Regimental System.

2nd Artillery (less former 2nd Field Artillery Battalion) reorganized and redesignated 1 September 1971 as the 2nd Air Defense Artillery, a parent regiment under the Combat Arms Regimental System (former 2nd Field Artillery Battalion concurrently reorganized and redesignated as the 2nd Field Artillery – hereafter separate lineage).

Withdrawn 16 January 1989 from the Combat Arms Regimental System and reorganized under the United States Army Regimental System.

=== Annex 1 (2nd AAA Group) ===
Constituted 5 August 1942 in the Army of the United States as Headquarters and Headquarters Battery, 2nd Antiaircraft Artillery Automatic Weapons Group (or 2nd Coast Artillery Group (Antiaircraft)).

Activated 17 August 1942 at Fort Bliss, Texas.

Redesignated 26 May 1943 as Headquarters and Headquarters Battery, 2nd Antiaircraft Artillery Group.

Departed the United States 5 September 1943, arrived in England 18 September 1943. Landed at Utah Beach, France on 12 July 1944; crossed into Belgium 24 September 1944 and into Holland 29 October 1944. Entered Germany 3 March 1945; returned to New York port of embarkation in October 1945.

Inactivated 26 October 1945 at Camp Kilmer, New Jersey.

=== Annex 2 (136th AAA-G Bn) ===
Constituted 25 February 1943 in the Army of the United States as the 136th Antiaircraft Artillery Gun Battalion.

Activated 15 June 1943 at Camp Edwards, Massachusetts. Departed New York port of embarkation 26 July 1944, arrived in England 6 August 1944. Arrived in France 27 August 1944, served in the European Theater of Operations. Returned to the US at the Boston Port of Embarkation 11 December 1945.

Inactivated 12 December 1945 at Camp Myles Standish, Massachusetts.

=== Annex 3 (795th AAA-AW Bn, 42nd AAA-AW Bn) ===
Constituted 25 February 1943 in the Army of the United States as the 795th Coast Artillery Battalion (Antiaircraft) (Automatic Weapons).

Activated 20 April 1943 at Camp Stewart, Georgia.

Redesignated 30 April 1943 as the 795th Antiaircraft Artillery Automatic Weapons Battalion. Departed Boston port of embarkation 7 April 1944; arrived in England 16 April 1944. Arrived in France 18 July 1944, served in the European Theater of Operations.

Inactivated 31 December 1945 in Germany.

Redesignated 25 June 1948 as the 42nd Antiaircraft Artillery Automatic Weapons Battalion and assigned to the 9th Infantry Division.

Activated 12 July 1948 at Fort Dix, New Jersey.

=== Annex 4 (434th AAA-AW Bn) ===
Constituted 31 January 1942 in the Army of the United States as the 434th Coast Artillery Battalion (Antiaircraft) (Automatic Weapons).

Activated 1 March 1942 at Camp Hulen, Texas. Departed New York port of embarkation 4 August 1942; arrived in Scotland 17 August 1942 and in England two days later. Moved to North Africa 19 January 1943, and Italy 10 October 1943.

Redesignated 5 December 1943 as the 434th Antiaircraft Artillery Automatic Weapons Battalion (Self-Propelled).

Disbanded 14 January 1945 at Montecatini, Italy, assets to 1st Battalion, 473rd Infantry Regiment.

Reconstituted 20 March 1951 in the Regular Army.

== Campaign participation credit ==
- War of 1812: Canada.
- Indian Wars: Florida, Seminoles.
- Mexican War: Palo Alto; Resaca de la Palma; Monterey; Vera Cruz; Cerro Gordo; Contreras; Churubusco; Molino del Rey; Chapultepec; Tamaulipas 1846; Puebla 1847.
- American Civil War: Bull Run; Peninsula; Antietam; Fredericksburg; Chancellorsville; Gettysburg; Wilderness; Spotsylvania; Cold Harbor; Petersburg; Shenandoah; Appomattox; Florida 1861; Florida 1862; Virginia 1861; Virginia 1862; Virginia 1863; Virginia 1865; Maryland 1863.
- World War II: Tunisia; Naples-Foggia; Anzio; Rome-Arno; Normandy; Northern France; North Apennines; Rhineland; Ardennes-Alsace; Central Europe; England 1944.
- Vietnam: Counteroffensive, Phase II; Counteroffensive, Phase III; Tet Counteroffensive; Counteroffensive, Phase IV; Counteroffensive, Phase V; Counteroffensive, Phase VI; Tet 69/Counteroffensive; Summer-Fall 1969; Winter-Spring 1970; Sanctuary Counteroffensive; Counteroffensive, Phase VII.
- Southwest Asia: Liberation and Defense of Kuwait.

== Decorations ==
- Meritorious Unit Commendation, streamer embroidered VIETNAM 1967-1968 (5-2nd ADAR)
- Air Force Outstanding Unit Award, streamer embroidered KOREA 1978–1981 (1-2nd ADAR)
- Army Superior Unit Award for 1990–1991

== Current configuration ==
Active Units:

- 3rd Battalion, 2nd Air Defense Artillery Regiment (3-2nd ADAR)
- A Battery, 2nd Air Defense Artillery Regiment (A-2nd ADAR)
- B Battery, 2nd Air Defense Artillery Regiment (B-2nd ADAR)
- D Battery, 2nd Air Defense Artillery Regiment (D-2nd ADAR)

Inactive Units:

- 1st Battalion, 2nd Air Defense Artillery Regiment (1-2nd ADAR)
- 2nd Battalion, 2nd Air Defense Artillery Regiment (2-2nd ADAR)
- 4th Battalion, 2nd Air Defense Artillery Regiment (4-2nd ADAR)
- 5th Battalion, 2nd Air Defense Artillery Regiment (5-2nd ADAR)

== Coat of arms ==
- Shield

Paly of fifteen, gules and argent, two Indian arrows saltirewise or, behind a serpent vert, lipped and eyed of the third, coiled around and above a prickly pear cactus proper.

- Crest

On a wreath of the colors, argent and gules, an eagle close or sitting on and at the intersection or a saltire azure fimbriated argent.

- Motto

Fidus Ultra Finem (Faithful Beyond the End).

=== Symbolism ===
- Shield

The shield is scarlet for artillery. The fifteen stripes, representative of the United States national flag of 1814, allude to the battle of Fort McHenry in which a company of the regiment participated. The snake and cactus commemorate service in the Mexican War. The arrows refer to the Indian Wars.

- Crest

The American eagle, centered on the saltire from the battle flag of the Confederacy, depicts the defense of Fort Pickens, the only fort south of Fort Monroe that remained loyal to the federal government throughout the Civil War.

== Distinctive unit insignia ==
The distinctive insignia is an adaptation of the crest and motto of the coat of arms.

== See also ==
- Battery A, 2nd U.S. Artillery
- 2nd U.S. Artillery, Battery G
- List of United States Regular Army Civil War units
- Field Artillery Branch (United States)
- Air Defense Artillery Branch (United States)
- U.S. Army Coast Artillery Corps
