= Alanson Merwin Randol =

Union soldier in the American Civil War (1837–1887)

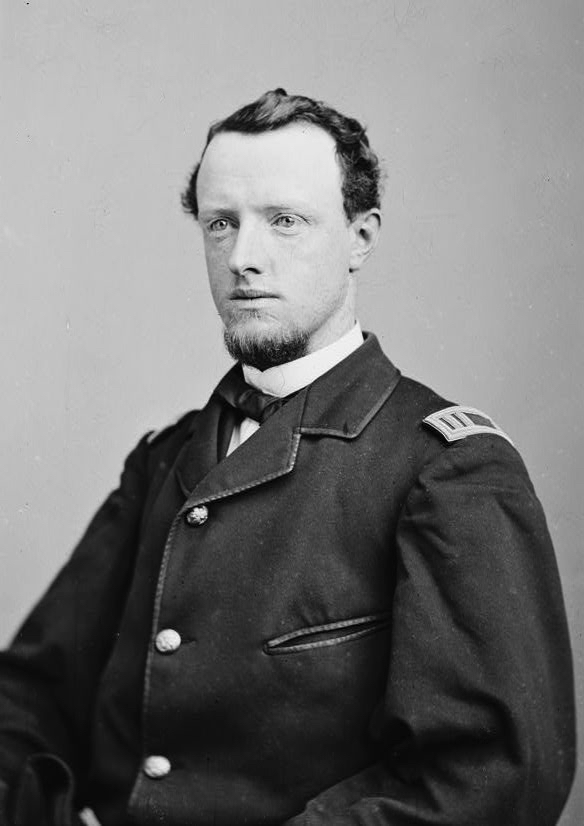
- Born: October 23, 1837; Newburgh, New York, US
- Died: May 7, 1887 (aged 49); New Almaden, California, US
- Burial place: San Francisco National Cemetery, San Francisco, California, US
- Education: United States Military Academy
- Spouse(s): Elizabeth Beck Guion (m. 1869)
- Children: Mary; Clara; Emily; Clarence; Alanson; Isabella; Christiana; Marshall; Francis
- Military career
- Allegiance: United States
- Branch: United States Army; Union Army
- Service years: 1860–1887
- Rank: Colonel; Brevet Brigadier General of Volunteers
- Units: 1st Missouri Light Artillery; 1st U.S. Artillery; 3rd U.S. Artillery; 4th U.S. Artillery; 2nd New York Cavalry Regiment
- Commands: Battery L, 1st Missouri Light Artillery; Battery E & G, 1st U.S. Artillery; Battery I, 1st U.S. Artillery; Battery H, 1st U.S. Artillery; 2nd New York Cavalry Regiment; Battery K, 1st U.S. Artillery; Battery L, 1st U.S. Artillery; Fort Delaware; Fort Winfield Scott; Fort Alcatraz; Fort Canby
- Conflicts: American Civil War; Peninsula Campaign; Seven Days Battles; Second Battle of Bull Run; Battle of Antietam; Battle of Fredericksburg; Battle of Chancellorsville; Battle of Gettysburg; Mine Run Campaign; Overland Campaign; Siege of Petersburg; Battle of Five Forks; Appomattox Campaign; Great Railroad Strike of 1877

Signature
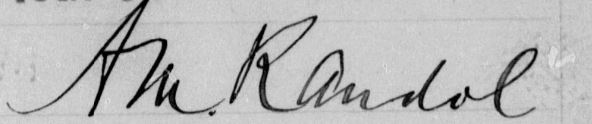

Alanson Merwin Randol (October 23, 1837 – May 7, 1887) was a career United States Army artillery officer and graduate of the United States Military Academy at West Point (Class of 1860) who served in the American Civil War. He was promoted multiple times for gallant and meritorious service in battle, rising during the course of the war from the rank of second lieutenant to brevet brigadier general of volunteers.

While Randol was a noted artillerist who served with the 1st U.S. Artillery in nearly every major land battle of the Eastern Theater of the Civil War, he also commanded the volunteer 2nd New York Cavalry Regiment in battle from December 1864 through April 1865, when he was present to witness General Robert E. Lee's surrender at Appomattox Court House.

At the end of the Civil War, Randol returned to the Regular Army artillery service; he commanded companies of the 1st U.S. Artillery in garrison duty across the United States from 1865 until his death from kidney disease at his brother's home at New Almaden, California in 1887.

== Early life and career ==
Alanson Merwin Randol was born in Newburgh, New York, the fifth of seven children born to Alanson and Mary Randol (née Butterworth). His mother died when Randol was eight years old in 1846, and his father was remarried in 1847. Alanson Randol, Sr. was an overseer at the United States Assay Office in New York (the modern-day United States Mint) and a prominent member of his local Methodist congregation.

The 1850 United States Census listed Randol as living in Redding, Connecticut where he attended the Redding Institute, a private Christian liberal arts boarding school administered by Professor Daniel Sanford. In 1855 at the age of 17, Randol secured an appointment to the United States Military Academy at West Point, New York upon the recommendation of New York State Judge Advocate General Elijah Ward.

His father committed suicide in 1859 during Randol's fourth year at West Point.

Randol finished the standard five-year course of instruction at West Point; his class began with 61 cadets in 1855 and ended with 41 cadets at graduation in June 1860. Prominent members of the Class of 1860 included Horace Porter, James Harrison Wilson, John Moulder Wilson, Stephen Dodson Ramseur, Alexander Cummings McWhorter Pennington Jr., and Wesley Merritt. Randol also associated in academy life with George Armstrong Custer (with whom he would serve in the Civil War) and Morris Schaff. Randol maintained a generally-high academic standing throughout his West Point career (in the top 15 of his class during four of five years) and was ranked 9th in the Class of 1860.

Upon leaving West Point, Randol was initially commissioned as a brevet second lieutenant in the United States Artillery on July 1, 1860. He was transferred to the United States Army Ordnance Department to serve at Benicia Arsenal near San Francisco, California in October 1860, where he was promoted to the permanent rank of second lieutenant from November 22, 1860.

== Civil War service ==
=== Return to the Eastern Theater ===
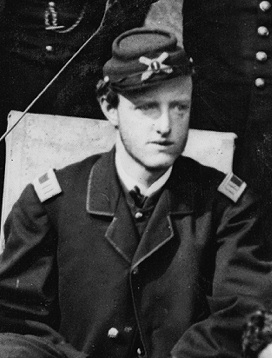
Captain Alanson M. Randol, 1863. (Note 1st Artillery patch on cap)

Following the siege of Fort Sumter in April 1861, Lieutenant Randol was ordered east from Benicia Arsenal to join the fighting in the Eastern Theater. On May 14, 1861, he was promoted to first lieutenant in the artillery service, and along the way to Washington, D.C. he served for a time with Major General John C. Frémont's Department of the West, commanding Battery L, 1st Missouri Light Artillery from August to December 1861.

Upon arrival in Washington, D.C., Randol was ordered to join the artillery defenses of the Capital under Colonel George W. Getty's Second Brigade, Artillery Reserve of the Union Army of the Potomac. On January 1, 1862, he assumed command of Battery E, 1st U.S. Artillery in the absence of Captain Jefferson C. Davis, who remained on detached service in the Western Theater for the duration of the war. At the time he joined, the battery included subordinate section chiefs Lieutenants Samuel S. Elder, Lorenzo Thomas Jr., and Theophilus Bhyrd von Michalowski and was armed with four 12-pounder cannons and two 6-pounder howitzers. These pieces were soon replaced with six smoothbore Model 1857 light 12-pounder "Napoleon" guns.

Battery E was understrength, only recently refitted and rearmed following its return from Charleston, South Carolina, where it had been present for hard duty throughout the siege of Fort Sumter under Captain Abner Doubleday; on February 23, 1862, the unit was merged with a portion of Battery G, 1st U.S. Artillery (including two new section chiefs, fellow New Yorker Lieutenants Egbert Worth Olcott and Edward Bayard Hill). The remaining part of Battery G not merged with Randol's battery was transferred to Captain William M. Graham's Battery K, 1st U.S. Artillery, along with two of Battery E's officers, Lieutenants Thomas and von Michalowski; Lieutenant Elder was also transferred within two months' time to command of Battery K, the command of his vacant section in Battery E passing to veteran non-commissioned officer First Sergeant James Chester.

Randol's newly combined batteries formed an amalgamated artillery company known thereafter as Battery E & G, 1st U.S. Artillery or, colloquially, "Randol's Battery."

=== Peninsula Campaign and the Seven Days Battles ===
On March 10, 1862, Battery E & G, 1st U.S. Artillery joined Major General George B. McClellan's Army of the Potomac as it embarked upon the Peninsula Campaign on Virginia's York-James Peninsula. The battery was attached to the Artillery Reserve under Colonel Henry Jackson Hunt. Traveling by sea and landing at Fortress Monroe, Battery E & G joined the Siege of Yorktown, then moved westward with the Army of the Potomac to the Chickahominy River. Following the Battle of Fair Oaks, the battery was stationed by the Woodbury Bridge near McClellan's headquarters at Savage's Station until June 29, 1862. After General Robert E. Lee's Army of Northern Virginia shook McClellan's confidence with a string of heavy blows opening the Seven Days Battles at Beaver Dam Creek/Mechanicsville and Gaines' Mill, the Union commander ordered his bloodied V Corps (then north of the Chickahominy) to return south of the river and follow the rest of the Army of the Potomac on a retreat toward the perceived safety of the banks of the James River near Harrison's Landing. This massive redeployment was undertaken from June 29–30, 1862.

=== Battle of Glendale ===
(Main:Battle of Glendale)

In the afternoon of June 29, 1862, Battery E & G, 1st U.S. Artillery was ordered to proceed from the camp of the Artillery Reserve in the White Oak Swamp to temporary duty attached to Brigadier General George Archibald McCall's Third Division, V Corps. Battery C, 5th U.S. Artillery of McCall's division was badly mauled at Gaines' Mill (its commander Captain Henry V. De Hart mortally wounded in action) and Randol's battery was tasked with supporting the remaining Pennsylvania state volunteer artillery units of McCall's division. The Third Division, fully-composed of volunteer infantry regiments and artillery companies of the Pennsylvania Reserves, sustained heavy losses (1,889 casualties) in the previous two battles north of the Chickahominy and was no longer fit for a prolonged fight; one historian of the division wrote, "most of the men were fitter subjects for the hospital than for the battle-field." Randol's battery joined Colonel William Averell's 3rd Pennsylvania Cavalry and Captain Henry Benson's Battery M, 2nd U.S. Artillery, U.S. Horse Artillery Brigade alongside McCall's division late in the afternoon of June 29 as it marched from the White Oak Swamp toward its overnight objective: the defense of the critical junction of the New Market and Quaker Roads at Glendale, where the whole of the Army of the Potomac would be required to pass on its route across Malvern Hill and onward to the James River.

McClellan recognized that Lee's likely objective would be the bisection of the Army of the Potomac while it was in transit and most vulnerable—failure to protect its flank would spell certain disaster. McCall's Third Division, combined with elements of the divisions of Generals John Sedgwick, Joseph Hooker, Philip Kearny, Henry Slocum and William Smith, would deploy along a north-to-south line from the White Oak Swamp to Malvern Hill, parallel to the Quaker Road, in order to check against any Confederate advance in the vicinity until the Army was safely past.

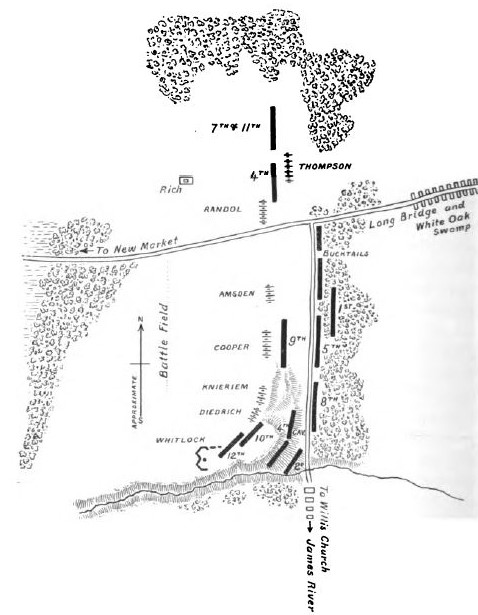
Map of the Union Order of Battle at Glendale, June 30, 1862 (from Powell's Fifth Army Corps - 1896)

The division became lost along the road overnight: Randol's battery, following McCall's three brigades (under the respective commands of Colonel Seneca Galusha Simmons and Brigadier Generals George Gordon Meade and Truman Seymour), managed to overshoot the junction of the roads at Glendale in the heavy darkness, marching approximately 1.5 miles (2.4 km) west of their objective. Meade discovered the error around midnight on June 30, when Averell and Benson's advanced pickets met Confederate skirmishers moving in the opposite direction. Randol's own cannoneers reported encountering Confederate sentries in the dark approximately 100 yards (91 m) west of their guns, then-deployed in an open field north of the New Market Road.

At approximately 4:00 AM on June 30 the battery moved east with McCall's column while it retraced the path to Glendale, the vanguard of the division arriving after dawn and believing it had proceeded safely beyond Federal lines. McCall's men waited for orders until approximately noon, unaware that they were, in fact, representing the extreme western flank of the Union Army while the Confederate main force under Major Generals James Longstreet and Ambrose Powell Hill were rapidly approaching to assault the crossroad. It was not until Meade and Seymour personally reconnoitered the trees to the west of the open field in which the division was bivouacked that they discovered there was practically nothing standing between the approaching rebels and McCall's line. They immediately alerted McCall, who deployed his brigades for battle.

Battery E & G was attached to Meade's Second Brigade, forming the extreme right flank of McCall's line overlooking a wide open field to the west sloping downward for 400 yards (370 m) toward McDowell's Creek and a line of heavy pine trees. To Randol's right, McCall's division met Kearny's; to his immediate left stood two batteries of the 1st Pennsylvania Light Artillery deployed along McCall's center; on the far-left, two more batteries of the 1st Battalion, New York Light Artillery, also on loan from the Artillery Reserve.

A Confederate artillery barrage signaled to the Federals that an assault was imminent. Soon afterward, the cannonry stopped and heavy fighting took place as Confederate units emerged from the woods opposite McCall in piecemeal fashion, offering probing attacks along the whole line. The difficulty of the terrain and poor communication prevented the combined assault envisioned by Lee, which allowed the Federals to focus on repulsing isolated attacks as they occurred. Opening the fight, a massive infantry assault made by Brigadier General James L. Kemper's brigade emerged on the Union left flank; this sudden attack caused McCall to shift the majority of his First Brigade reserves to the left, away from the right and center just prior to a second Confederate assault made against the center-right by Colonel Micah Jenkins' brigade supported by regiments of Brigadier General Cadmus M. Wilcox's brigade.

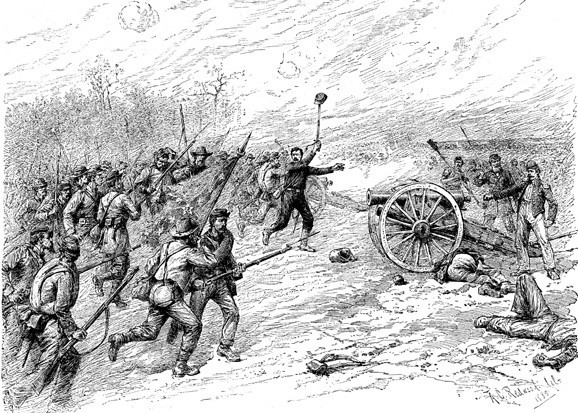
"The Charge of Confederates Upon Randol's Battery" by A.C. Redwood

Randol stood on the extreme right of McCall's line, north of the New Market Road, when Jenkins' brigade assaulted the 1st Pennsylvania Light Artillery batteries to his left (Captain James Cooper's Battery B and Lieutenant Frank Power Amsden's Battery G). He shifted his battery's arc of fire from west to south, done in order to rake Jenkins' advancing regiments with murderous enfilading crossfire as they charged the two batteries south of the road. This traversing movement was successful, but two of Wilcox's Alabama infantry regiments suddenly broke from the woods along the northwestern edge of the field and appeared upon Randol's newly exposed right flank: Randol immediately ordered his battery traversed back to the west and met the first wave of Wilcox's advancing 8th Alabama Infantry Regiment, repulsing two consecutive infantry charges with canister shot, supported by Kearny's artillery under Captain James Thompson (Battery G, 2nd U.S. Artillery) in parallel to his right.

Randol's cannoneers might have successfully repelled a renewed third Confederate infantry charge, but at the moment when the 8th Alabama's second charge against the guns broke, some of Randol's infantry support (alternately men of Colonel Albert Lewis Magilton's 4th Pennsylvania Reserve Regiment or Colonel Elisha Boanerges Harvey's 7th Pennsylvania Reserve Regiment) rose and charged after the rebels to the front of the battery, obscuring the cannons' field of fire. The Pennsylvanian infantrymen advanced for a short distance until encountering the second of Wilcox's regiments (the 11th Alabama Infantry Regiment), which met them with a massed volley of riflery and advanced with bayonets. The Pennsylvanians broke and routed directly toward the face of the battery, masking Battery E & G's fire until it was too late to act. Though Randol's cannoneers managed a single discharge of double-shotted canister in their own defense, Confederate infantry swarmed the battery and overran his guns, driving the gunners from their posts at the point of bayonet and back to his line of ammunition caissons.

Meade was wounded during the fighting, his last order given before leaving the field for Randol to "fight your guns to the last, but save them if possible."

Indescribably brutal hand-to-hand and bayonet combat ensued, recounted by McCall as "one of the fiercest bayonet fights that perhaps ever occurred on this continent." After a desperate struggle with nightfall fast approaching, Randol was able to rally a company of infantry with the help of McCall and Magilton. They stormed his captured guns and retook them following a brief, intense melee fight; nevertheless, 38 battery horses had been killed and Randol's cannoneers were unable to drag the heavy 12-pounder Napoleon guns from the field before Wilcox returned in a renewed assault made with the assistance of two additional brigades under Brigadier Generals Lawrence O'Bryan Branch and Roger Atkinson Pryor. The party successfully rescued Randol's mortally-wounded section chief Lieutenant E.B. Hill, but all six 12-pounder Napoleons were necessarily abandoned to the Confederates after darkness fell when Randol could not convince Brigadier General Samuel P. Heintzelman (commanding Kearny's neighboring force) to spare men to retrieve them for fear of sparking a renewed nighttime battle after fighting had generally ceased.

At the close of the battle, Randol's Battery E & G was no longer a functional artillery company. Arriving at Malvern Hill in the early hours of July 1, Randol reported to Colonel Hunt his battery's losses: two men killed and nine wounded, 38 horses killed, all of his six 12-pounder Napoleons lost, and but two caissons and four limbers abandoned to the enemy.

Randol's six 12-pounder Napoleon guns were removed by the rebels and employed in the service of the Confederate Washington Artillery of New Orleans until recaptured in 1864. Given their relative service histories, it is therefore likely that Randol was fired upon by his own captured artillery pieces on at least one occasion.

=== Malvern Hill and Glendale Court of Inquiry ===
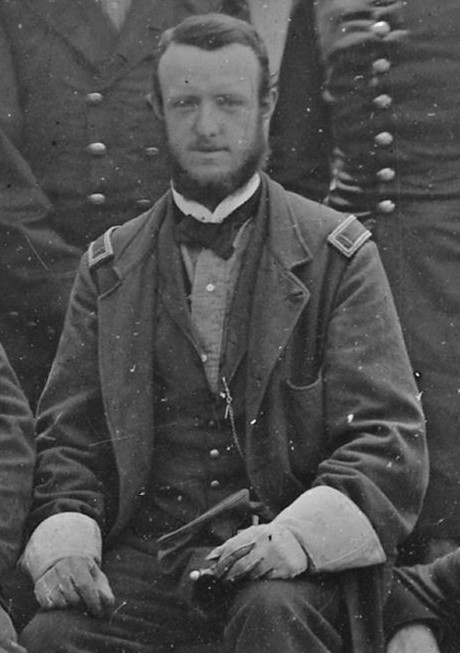
Brevet Captain Alanson M. Randol, Harrison's Landing, Virginia - July 1862

As the morning of July 1, 1862 dawned and Lee's Confederates approached to renew hostilities at the Battle of Malvern Hill, Randol's remaining enlisted men were temporarily attached to Lieutenant Edmund Kirby's Battery I, 1st U.S. Artillery, while Randol and his sole remaining commissioned section chief (Lieutenant E.W. Olcott) offered their services to Colonel Hunt as aides-de-camp during the battle. Hunt mentioned both in his battle report, including Randol assuming command of the six M1844 32-pounder howitzers of Captain Edward Grimm's Battery D, 1st Battalion, New York Light Artillery in the twilight of the battle, assisting to drive away the final Confederate thrust before Union victory.

Following Malvern Hill, Randol and Olcott were temporarily detailed to Captain James Madison Robertson's Battery B & L, 2nd U.S. Artillery (Horse Artillery Brigade). After the Army of the Potomac settled into its new camp at Harrison's Landing on the James River, Randol was breveted to the rank of captain for "gallant and meritorious services in action" at Glendale, effective June 30, 1862.

On July 6, Randol's Battery E & G, 1st U.S. Artillery was rearmed with four light 12-pounder Napoleons drawn from Colonel Robert O. Tyler's 1st Connecticut Heavy Artillery, reformed under section chiefs Olcott and Chester. The replenished Battery E & G was attached to Major General Joseph Hooker's Second Division of Heintzelman's III Corps for most of the time the Army of the Potomac was present at Harrison's Landing before returning to V Corps in General George Sykes' Second Division in August 1862.

Immediately following the Seven Days' fighting in early July 1862, Randol requested that a Court of Inquiry be convened at Harrison's Landing to investigate the circumstances surrounding the loss of his battery at Glendale, clearly desiring that the stigma and blame associated with the loss of his artillery pieces be expunged from his military record. He wrote to Meade (then recuperating from his Glendale wounds in Philadelphia), who provided a glowing letter of reference which absolved him from blame and instead placed the fault squarely upon his own Pennsylvania Reserves infantry regiments in support:

You may rest assured that if I do make a report I shall do full justice to the coolness and good conduct exhibited by yourself and the Staff Officers and men under your command on that unfortunate day. I am aware, and shall so state, that everything was done that could be done by yourself and command to repel the enemy and save your battery. I am also aware, and shall so state, that the loss of your battery was due to the failure of the Infantry supports to maintain that firm and determined front which I should have expected from my men had not their morale been impaired by the fatigues incident to previous battles, constant marches, loss of rest and want of food, exhausting their physical energies to such a degree that they were not able to withstand the desperate and determined onslaught of overwhelming numbers causing them to give way sooner than under other circumstances I should have expected them to have done. (George Meade to Alanson Randol, July 12, 1862)

The Court of Inquiry, composed of two infantry officers (Lieutenant Colonel Robert Christie Buchanan, 4th U.S. Infantry, and Major Joseph Hayes, 18th Massachusetts Infantry Regiment) and two artillery officers (Captain John Caldwell Tidball, Battery A, 2nd U.S. Artillery, and Lieutenant Adelbert Ames, Battery A, 5th U.S. Artillery), met in late July and considered all testimony and evidence. Their conclusion was as follows:

That the supports of the battery, composed of the 4th and 7th regiments Pennsylvania reserves, failed to support the battery, but having advanced in front of the battery suddenly broke and fell back upon the battery, without unmasking it, thereby preventing its fire until the enemy were nearly in the battery; That the infantry, whose duty was to support, shamefully ran and abandoned the battery, affording it no support; That so many of the horses were either killed or wounded as to render the moving of the guns from the field utterly impracticable. That Lieut. Randol, the officers and men of the battery used their utmost exertions to save the guns, not abandoning them until the supports had retreated and the enemy had seized the guns, and they therefore faithfully performed their whole duty. (Special Orders, No. 86 - July 22, 1862)

=== Post-Seven Days and Second Bull Run/Manassas ===
When the Army of the Potomac moved across the Virginia Peninsula toward Aquia Creek to terminate the Peninsula Campaign, V Corps continued north to join Major General John Pope's Union Army of Virginia in its campaign beyond the Rappahannock River as it engaged Confederate forces near the old First Bull Run battlefield, an action which became the Second Battle of Bull Run/Manassas on August 29–30, 1862. Throughout both days of the battle, Battery E & G, 1st U.S. Artillery was ordered to remain in place near the front line, drawing constant fire though it was inactive. Conflicting orders and confusion nearly resulted in the loss of the battery when the enemy repulsed the Union line on the 30th. The battle was a Union defeat, and both Pope and Major General Fitz John Porter (commanding V Corps) were subjected to heavy criticism for the result. Pope was practically exiled to frontier duty in Minnesota; Porter was court-martialed and spent years attempting to clear his name: in 1878, Randol offered sworn testimony before a commission convened to investigate the circumstances of the battle, the findings of which eventually resulted in the overturning of Porter's court-martial and restoration of his commission.

=== Maryland Campaign to Fredericksburg ===
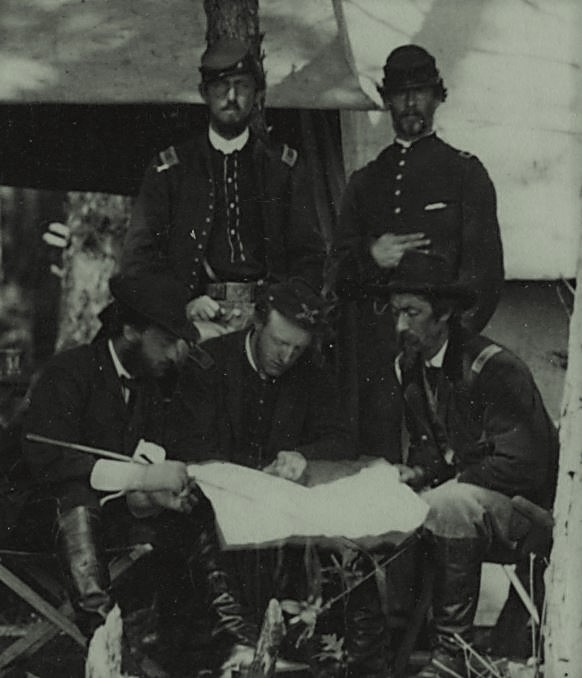
Artillery officers of the Horse Artillery at Culpeper, VA, September 1863. (Left to right, top row: Alexander C.M. Pennington Jr., Terrence Reilly, Bottom row: unknown, Alanson M. Randol, Samuel S. Elder)

Following the defeat at Second Bull Run, Battery E & G, 1st U.S. Artillery returned to Washington, D.C. and continued onward to Hyattstown, Maryland, where Randol attempted to re-equip his depleted battery (equipment not lost at Bull Run was in a worn-out condition, and all unnecessary baggage and personal possessions which had been left behind on the march from Harrison's Landing to Bull Run was discovered to have been lost or stolen.)

In early September 1862, Lee's Army of Northern Virginia invaded Maryland and reinstated Union Army commander General McClellan mobilized to meet him. On September 14, Battery E & G was held in reserve during the Battle of South Mountain. During the Battle of Antietam on September 17, the battery was detached from Sykes' division to General Alfred Pleasonton's Cavalry Corps with units of the Horse Artillery Brigade. Advancing along the Boonsboro Pike, Randol relieved Robertson's Battery B & L, 2nd U.S. Artillery and engaged rebel artillery west of the Middle Bridge on Antietam Creek along the way to Sharpsburg, Maryland. The rebel artillery was driven back, but Randol's battery remained in reserve for the rest of the engagement; the majority of the fighting that day took place to the northwest and southwest of their position.

One gun of the battery was briefly engaged on September 19, and on the 20th the whole battery repulsed Confederate cavalry during the Battle of Shepherdstown. Battery E & G remained in camp near Shepherdstown, Virginia until October 30, refitting and resupplying following the campaign.

On October 11, 1862, Randol was promoted to captain of Battery H, 1st U.S. Artillery. He did not join his new command, instead remaining on detached service in command of Battery E & G while Battery H was commanded by Lieutenant Justin E. Dimick.

In early November, the V Corps moved with the Army of the Potomac to join its newly appointed commander Major General Ambrose Burnside's campaign against Lee at Fredericksburg, Virginia, with Battery E & G engaged along the way at Snicker's Gap. Now attached to General Andrew Atkinson Humphreys' Third Division, V Corps, Randol was appointed Humphreys' division chief of artillery.

At the Battle of Fredericksburg, Battery E & G was placed near Marye's Heights on December 13. Randol was in such close proximity to the stone wall from where the Confederates fired effectively upon waves of futile infantry assaults that he was able to advise Humphreys and other Union generals the following morning of the strength of the defensive position:

Early the next morning [December 14] I was called in consultation as to the feasibility of battering down the stone wall behind which it was supposed the enemy was concealed. I reported against it, as I had by accident been near the wall the night before, and knew that what was supposed to be a stone wall bordering the field over which our troops had charged, was in reality a stone retaining wall to Marye's heights, along the base of which ran a long sunken road, in which the enemy was placed, and from which, and the rifle pits in prolongation of the road, he delivered such a deadly fire on our charging columns; that we might batter it down by a concentrated fire, but it would do no good unless the road was filled. A visit to the locality afterward confirmed me in the belief then formed and the opinion given to the council. (Alanson Randol, 1875)

At the close of the five-day battle, resulting in a decisive Confederate victory, the Army of the Potomac was so demoralized in defeat that Randol wrote to his uncle, Samuel Fowler Butterworth, that he was contemplating resigning his commission in the Army:

I have long contemplated asking your opinion about my resigning… the war has become distasteful to me; I can see no hope of success under our present rulers. What have we gained? I have been in nearly every battle fought in the East and, excepting Malvern and the doubtful victory of Antietam, we have been beaten in every battle! When is this to end? (Alanson Randol to Samuel Butterworth, December 20, 1862)

=== Mud March and Chancellorsville ===
Randol's Battery E & G, 1st U.S. Artillery joined Burnside's infamous Mud March of January 1863, finally entering winter camp and remaining until April 28, 1863, when Battery E & G struck out for Chancellorsville, Virginia, arriving May 1, 1863. The battery was still in transit when the Confederates attacked the Army of the Potomac near Chancellorsville. Joining the main body of the Army of the Potomac, Randol was ordered to support Sykes' division of V Corps near the Chancellor House until nightfall, when it moved north with Humphreys' division toward the Rappahannock River approximately one mile (1.6 km) south of U.S. Ford, where it stayed for the remainder of the battle mostly in reserve.

=== Horse Artillery Brigade and Gettysburg Campaign ===
On May 14, 1863, Battery E & G, 1st U.S. Artillery was transferred to the Captain John C. Tidball's Second Brigade of the Horse Artillery. Its four light 12-pounder Napoleons were traded-in for four 3-inch Ordnance Rifles. The battery re-trained as a "flying artillery" horse artillery company until June 13, when it joined Brigadier General David McMurtrie Gregg's Second Division of the Army of the Potomac's Cavalry Corps. Attached to Federal cavalry in pursuit of the Confederates moving northward toward Pennsylvania (eventually to Gettysburg, Pennsylvania), Randol's battery was constantly in battle, and learned to fight like horse artillerymen utilizing rifled guns on the front line of battle rather than placed toward the rear and supported by infantry as they had been previously:

We were frequently on the skirmish line, and sometimes in advance of it, and drove the enemy's batteries and cavalry from all their positions as fast as selected, dismounting some of his guns, blowing up limbers and caissons, and killing many men and horses. The accuracy of fire of the rifles, their long range, and the ease with which they could be handled, gave us a confidence in them which was not shaken during the remainder of the war.

Battery E & G was engaged in battle at the Battles of Aldie, Middleburgh, and Upperville, moving with the Cavalry Corps to pursue raiding Confederate Cavalry under Major General J. E. B. Stuart's cavalry when the Battle of Gettysburg began. It received orders to proceed directly to the Gettysburg battlefield, where it arrived July 2 (the second day of battle) and occupied a position to the right of the Union line. On July 3, while the main action at Gettysburg was focused upon the Union center at Cemetery Ridge, Randol's battery was engaged with the Cavalry Corps against Stuart's rebel cavalry attempting to flank the Union right several miles to the east. The Confederate cavalry was successfully repulsed.

Randol was breveted to the rank of major for "gallant and meritorious services" at Gettysburg, effective July 3, 1863.

Following the battle, Randol's Battery E & G pursued the retreating Confederate Army from Gettysburg with the Cavalry Corps. It remained attached to the cavalry through August 1863, finally sent to Harper's Ferry and relieved by Battery A, 4th U.S. Artillery (recently re-equipped as a horse artillery battery) before it was detached to the Army of the Potomac's Artillery Reserve in mid-August 1863.

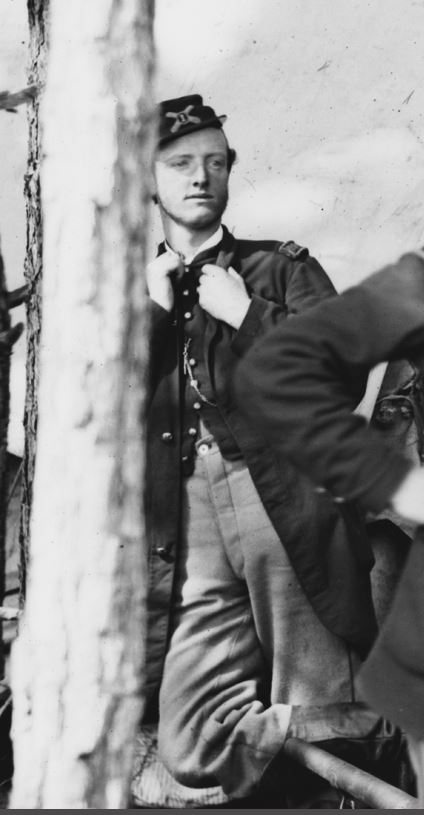
Captain Alanson M. Randol at Culpeper, VA, September 1863

=== Bristoe and Mine Run Campaigns ===
On September 1, 1863, Randol left detached service with Battery E & G, 1st U.S. Artillery to finally join his own company, Battery H, 1st U.S. Artillery, assuming with it the command of the First Brigade of the Artillery Reserve of the Army of the Potomac. He commanded the brigade throughout the Bristoe Campaign, transferred soon after to Battery I, 1st U.S. Artillery on October 12, 1863, to refit that company as a horse artillery battery; an accomplished horse artillery battery commander by this time, Randol led Battery I in the Mine Run Campaign and throughout the winter of 1863-64 while attached to Gregg's Second Division, Cavalry Corps, Army of the Potomac.

=== Overland Campaign ===
In April 1864, Battery I, 1st U.S. Artillery was merged with Battery H, 1st U.S. Artillery, creating the combined horse artillery Battery H & I, 1st U.S. Artillery under Randol's command. In May 1864, Battery H & I joined Major General Ulysses S. Grant's Overland Campaign, present during the battles of the Wilderness and Spotsylvania Courthouse with the Artillery Reserve and later attached to the Second Division of the Cavalry Corps, Army of the Potomac in June. It was present during the battles at Cold Harbor through St. Mary's Church. By July, the battery was mostly in camp refitting following heavy materiel losses sustained during the campaign, rejoining Gregg's division on July 25 at the Battle of First Deep Bottom, then present near the Battle of the Crater (referred to by Randol as the "mine fiasco") and Battle of Lee's Mill through July 30.

=== Return to West Point and command of 2nd New York Cavalry ===
On August 8, 1864, Randol was detailed temporarily to the United States Military Academy as an assistant professor of mathematics and artillery tactics. His tenure as an instructor lasted from August 27 to December 12, 1864, during which time he lobbied for command of a New York State volunteer regiment. In December 1864, he was offered and accepted the colonelcy of the 2nd New York Cavalry Regiment, and in March 1865 the unit joined the Appomattox Campaign with Brevet Major General George Custer's Third Division of General Philip Sheridan's Army of the Shenandoah. His brigade commander was former West Point classmate and fellow artillerist-turned-cavalryman Colonel Alexander C.M. Pennington Jr. of the 3rd New Jersey Cavalry Regiment

In the wave of brevet promotions issued near the end of the war, Randol was promoted to brevet lieutenant colonel in the Regular Army for "gallant and meritorious service" at the Battle of Five Forks and brevet colonel for the same qualities throughout the whole of the war, both dated to March 13, 1865. At the Battle of Appomattox Station, the 2nd New York Cavalry was instrumental in the capture of several Confederate locomotives containing supplies crucial to Lee's forces. Randol had been urged by Custer to fight valiantly, saying "Go in, old fellow, don’t let anything stop you; now is the chance for your stars. Whoop ’em up; I’ll be after you." Toward the end of the fight, the regiment was preparing to make a final desperate charge against a fortified Confederate artillery position–an action which Randol himself described as suicidal– when the enemy raised the white flag of surrender:

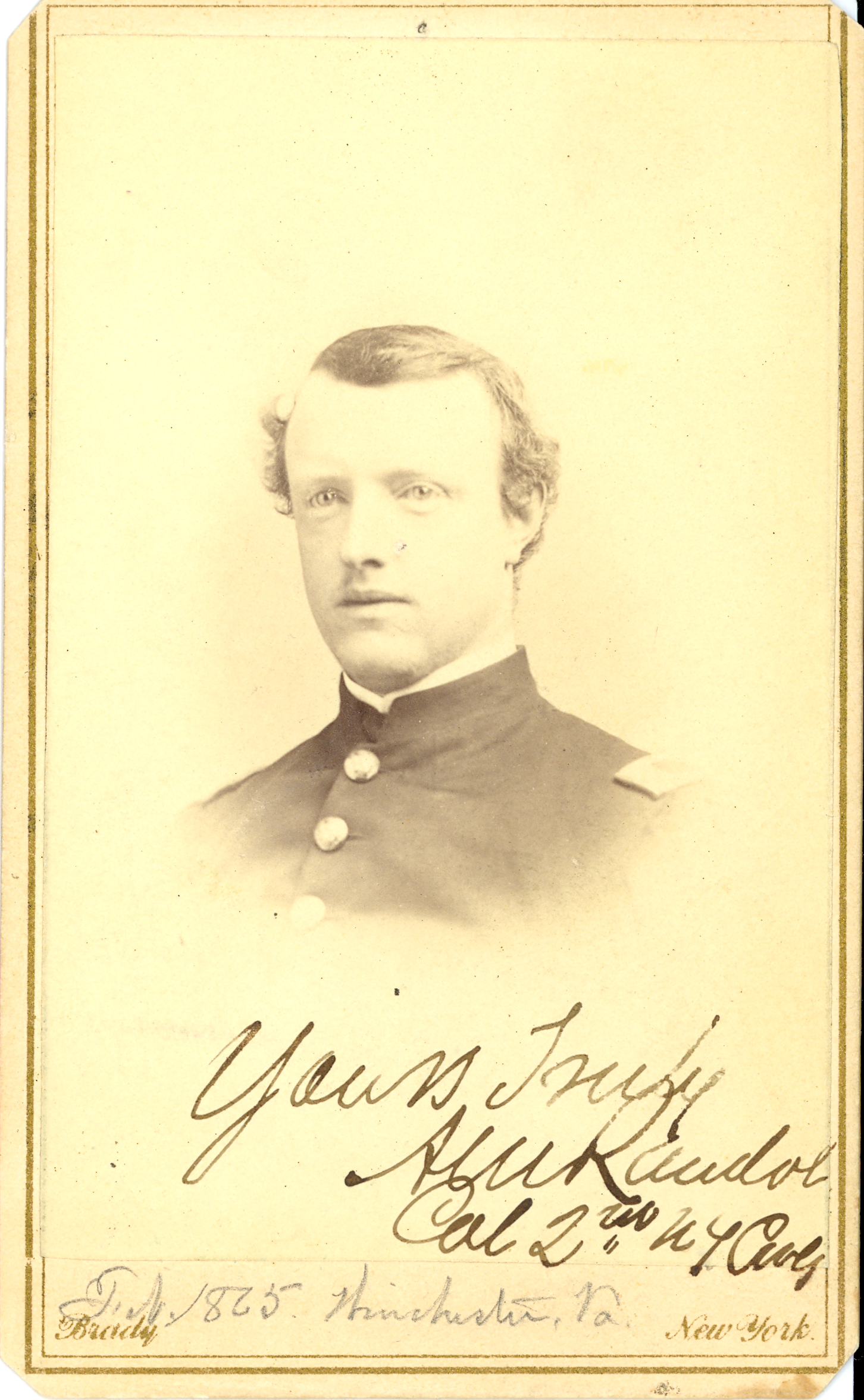
A carte-de-visite of Alanson M. Randol, produced by photographer Mathew Brady.

About daybreak I was aroused by loud hurrahs, and was told that Ord’s corps was coming up rapidly, and forming in rear of our cavalry. Soon after we were in the saddle and moving towards the Appomattox Court House road, where the firing was growing lively; but suddenly our direction was changed, and the whole cavalry corps rode at a gallop to the right of our line, passing between the position of the rebels and the rapidly forming masses of our infantry, who greeted us with cheers and shouts of joy as we galloped along their front. At several places we had to "run the gauntlet" of fire from the enemy’s guns posted around the Court House, but this only added to the interest of the scene, for we felt it to be the last expiring effort of the enemy to put on a bold front; we knew that we had them this time, and that at last Lee’s proud army of Northern Virginia was at our mercy. While moving at almost a charging gait we were suddenly brought to a halt by reports of a surrender. General Sheridan and his staff rode up, and left in hot haste for the Court House; but just after leaving us, they were fired into by a party of rebel cavalry, who also opened fire on us, to which we promptly replied, and soon put them to flight. Our lines were then formed for a charge on the rebel infantry; but while the bugles were sounding the charge, an officer with a white flag rode out from the rebel lines, and we halted. It was fortunate for us that we halted when we did, for had we charged we would have been swept into eternity, as directly in our front was a creek, on the other side of which was a rebel brigade, entrenched, with batteries in position, the guns double shotted with canister. To have charged this formidable array, mounted, would have resulted in almost total annihilation.

Randol was present at Appomattox Court House when Robert E. Lee met Ulysses S. Grant to discuss the terms of Confederate surrender on April 9, 1865:

After we had halted, we were informed that preliminaries were being arranged for the surrender of Lee’s whole army. At this news, cheer after cheer rent the air for a few moments, when soon all became as quiet as if nothing unusual had occurred. I rode forward between the lines with Custer and Pennington, and met several old friends among the rebels, who came out to see us. Among them, I remember [Colonel John W. "Gimlet" Lea – Johnston's Brigade], of Virginia, and [Colonel Robert V. Cowan – 33rd North Carolina], of North Carolina. I saw General Cadmus Wilcox just across the creek, walking to and fro with his eyes on the ground, just as was his wont when he was instructor at West Point. I called to him, but he paid no attention, except to glance at me in a hostile manner. While we were thus discussing the probable terms of the surrender, General Lee, in full uniform, accompanied by one of his staff, and General Babcock, of General Grant’s staff, rode from the Court House towards our lines. As he passed us, we all raised our caps in salute, which he gracefully returned.

It was here, as well, that Randol encountered another famous participant of the Civil War:

After the surrender, I rode over to the Court House with Colonel Pennington and others and visited the house in which the surrender had taken place, in search of some memento of the occasion. We found that everything had been appropriated before our arrival. Mr. Wilmer McLean, in whose house the surrender took place, informed us that on his farm at Manassas the first battle of Bull Run was fought. I asked him to write his name in my diary, for which, much to his surprise. I gave him a dollar. Others did the same, and I was told that he thus received quite a golden harvest.

== Post-Civil War career ==
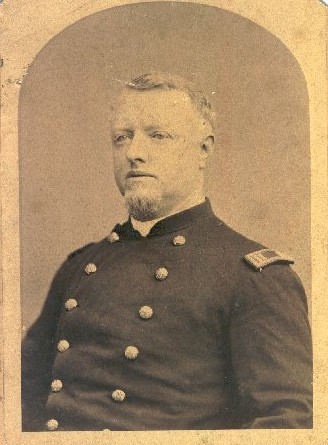
Captain Alanson M. Randol in Boston, ca. 1879.

When the Civil War ended, Randol was returned to his Regular Army rank of captain and resumed command of Battery I, 1st U.S. Artillery. In 1866 he received a brevet promotion to brigadier general of United States Volunteers for his war services, backdated to June 24, 1865.

At the war's end, as the United States Army mustered out most of its temporary wartime volunteer units and the Regular units resumed their pre-war garrison operations, the 1st U.S. Artillery was posted to various East Coast installations in the following years.

Captain Randol remained in the 1st U.S. Artillery and served in numerous locations nationwide in the following years:

- Fort Brown in Brownsville, Texas from 1865 to 1869;
- Fort Trumbull, Connecticut from 1869 to 1870;
- Fort Delaware, Delaware in 1870;
- Fort Wood, New York from 1870 to 1872;
- Fort Hamilton, New York in 1872;
- The Citadel in Charleston, South Carolina from 1872 to 1873;
- Fort Barrancas, Florida 1873 to 1875;
- Fort Independence, Massachusetts 1875 to 1879;
- Fort Warren, Massachusetts 1879 to 1881.

Randol was transferred to command of Battery K, 1st U.S. Artillery on April 23, 1872, and transferred to Battery L, 1st U.S. Artillery on July 25, 1873.

During the elections of 1874 and again in 1876, following the contentious presidential election in 1876, the companies of the 1st U.S. Artillery were sent to the Southern States to maintain order after concerns of public violence. Randol's battery was detached to New Orleans, Louisiana during the election of 1874, and to Florida and South Carolina in 1876.

In July 1877, Battery L was deployed with a battalion of Federal troops under Major John Hamilton, 1st U.S. Artillery, to Pittsburgh, Pennsylvania during the Great Railroad Strike of 1877. While in transit to the city by rail near Johnstown, Pennsylvania, the train carrying the battalion was pelted with rocks thrown by rioters and derailed when struck by a freight car full of bricks rolled from a siding into the train as it passed. The soldiers established a perimeter around the wrecked train and held off the rock-throwing rioters until a second train of reinforcements arrived.

In November 1881, the majority of the 1st U.S. Artillery regiment, including Battery L, was transferred to the Department of the Pacific on the West Coast of the United States and posted at the Presidio (Fort Winfield Scott) in San Francisco, California. Randol served for a month as Aide-de-Camp to Major General Irvin McDowell, Commander of the Department of California until he was promoted to the rank of major with the 3rd U.S. Artillery in April 1882.

In May 1882, Randol returned to the 1st U.S. Artillery, posted at the Presidio until October 1883; he was commanding officer of Fort Winfield Scott until December 1884, then Fort Alcatraz in San Francisco Bay until October 1886, and finally Fort Canby at the mouth of the Columbia River in Washington Territory in November 1886.

Randol wrote an essay describing his experiences commanding Battery E & G and H & I during the Civil War for a unit history of the 1st U.S. Artillery in 1875, and wrote another essay about his experience at the head of the 2nd New York Cavalry Regiment under Custer during the Battle of Appomattox Station in April 1865, published while he was posted in San Francisco in 1886.

== Illness and death ==
In 1886, Randol's health declined, attributed to Bright's disease of the kidneys diagnosed by the post surgeon shortly after his arrival at Fort Canby. This was possibly the result of his history of exposure to yellow fever while serving in the Southern United States during the Civil War and while posted in Texas and Florida post-war.

On November 22, 1886, Randol left on sick leave from Fort Canby for the warmer climate of San Francisco; he died of his illness on May 7, 1887, in New Almaden, California.

Randol's military funeral took place at the Presidio on May 9, 1887:

All the troops at the Presidio were in the funeral procession, together with Major General Howard and staff. The body of the dead officer was borne on a caisson drawn by six horses, followed by the deceased's horse carrying his rider's saddle and boots, the latter reversed in the stirrups . . . the dead officer was interred in the Military Cemetery, and three volleys were fired over his grave.

== Personal life ==
Randol was married to Elizabeth Beck Guion on January 23, 1869, at Brownsville, Texas, the daughter of United States Army chaplain Elijah Guion Jr.

At the time of his death, Randol was survived by four children, including (later-Brigadier General) Marshall Guion Randol. Five other children died in infancy.

Randol's brother, James Butterworth Randol, was manager of the New Almaden Quicksilver Mine. Alanson Randol died at his brother's home in New Almaden, California.

== Legacy ==
Randol was a member of the Military Order or the Loyal Legion of the United States, Companion of the First Class, Insignia No. 2535.

An Endicott Era coast artillery battery at Fort Worden was named after Randol in 1904.

== See also ==
- List of American Civil War brevet generals (Union)
- Battery E, 1st U.S. Artillery
- Battery G, 1st U.S. Artillery
- Battery I, 1st U.S. Artillery
- Battery K, 1st U.S. Artillery
