= 1st U.S. Artillery, Battery K =

1st U.S. Light Artillery, Battery "K"
- Active: 1861 - 1865
- Country: United States
- Allegiance: Union
- Branch: Field Artillery Branch (United States)
- Engagements: Peninsula Campaign; Siege of Yorktown; Battle of Williamsburg; Battle of Seven Pines; Seven Days Battles; Battle of Malvern Hill; Second Battle of Bull Run; Battle of Chantilly; Battle of Antietam; Battle of Fredericksburg; Battle of Chancellorsville; Battle of Gettysburg; Bristoe Campaign; Mine Run Campaign; Battle of the Wilderness; Battle of North Anna; Battle of Totopotomoy Creek; Battle of Cold Harbor; First Battle of Ream's Station; Third Battle of Winchester; Battle of Fisher's Hill; Battle of Cedar Creek

Battery "K" 1st Regiment of Artillery was a light artillery battery that served in the Union Army during the American Civil War.

== Service ==
The battery was stationed at Eagle Pass, Fort Duncan, Texas January–February 1861 before moving to Fort Taylor, Florida where it served until January 1862. It then moved to Washington, D.C., where it was attached to Artillery Reserve, Army of the Potomac, to May 1862. 2nd Brigade, Artillery Reserve, V Corps, Army of the Potomac, to September 1862. Reserve Artillery, V Corps, to December 1862. Artillery Reserve, Army of the Potomac, to June, 1862. 2nd Brigade, Horse Artillery, Army of the Potomac, to June 1864. Camp Barry, Washington, D.C., to August 1864. Horse Artillery, Army of the Shenandoah, Middle Military Division, to December 1864. Horse Artillery Reserve, Army of the Shenandoah, to April 1865. Cavalry Brigade, Army of the Shenandoah.

== Detailed service ==
Moved from Washington, D.D. to the Virginia Peninsula March 1862. Siege of Yorktown April 5-May 4. Battle of Williamsburg May 5. Battle of Seven Pines May 31-June 1. Seven Days Battles before Richmond June 25-July 1. Malvern Hill July 1. Moved to Fort Monroe, then to Centerville August 16–28. Pope's campaign in northern Virginia August 28-September 2. Battle of Groveton August 29. Second Battle of Bull Run August 30. Battle of Chantilly September 1. Maryland Campaign September 6–22. Battle of Antietam September 16–17. Battle of Fredericksburg, Va., December 11–15. At Falmouth, Va., until April 1863. Chancellorsville Campaign April 27-May 6. Battle of Chancellorsville May 1–5. Brandy Station or Fleetwood and Beverly Ford June 9. Upperville June 21. Battle of Gettysburg July 1–3. Williamsburg and Hagerstown, Md., July 6. Boonsboro July 8. Benevola or Beaver Creek July 9. About Funkstown July 10–13. Brandy Station August 1–4. Advance from the Rappahannock to the Rapidan September 13–15. Culpeper Court House September 13. Robertson's Ford September 15. Bristoe Campaign October 9–22. Jeffersontown October 12–13. Advance to line of the Rappahannock November 7–8. Mine Run Campaign November 26-December 2. Reconnaissance from Bealeton to Front Royal January 1–4, 1864. Rapidan Campaign May 4-June 12. Wilderness May 5–7. Spotsylvania Court House May 8–21. North Anna May 23–26. Totopotomoy May 28–31. Cold Harbor June 1–12. Ream's Station June 21. Wilson's Raid on Southside & Danville Railroad June 22–30. Nottaway Court House June 23. Sappony Church or Stony Creek June 28–29. Ream's Station June 29. Moved to Washington, D.C., July 12–14. Sheridan's Shenandoah Valley Campaign August 7-November 28. Near Kearneysville August 25. Leetown and Smithfield August 28. Smithfield Crossing, Opequan Creek, August 29. Savior's Ford, Opequan Creek, September 15. Third Battle of September 19. Fisher's Hill September 21. Milford September 22. Mt. Jackson September 23–24. Port Republic September 26–27. Battle of Cedar Creek October 19. Duty in the defenses of Washington and the Shenandoah Valley until August 1865.

== Commanders ==
- Captain William Montrose Graham, Jr.
- 1st Lieutenant Samuel Sherer Elder - commanded during the Seven Days Battles
- 1st Lieutenant Lorenzo Thomas, Jr. - commanded at the Battle of Chancellorsville
- 1st Lieutenant John Eagan - commanded during the Bristoe and Mine Run campaigns and the Battle of the Wilderness
- 1st Lieutenant Franck E. Taylor - commanded at the Third Battle of Winchester and the Battle of Cedar Creek
- Captain Alanson Merwin Randol - post-war

== See also ==
- List of United States Regular Army Civil War units
- 1st Air Defense Artillery Regiment
