= 4th U.S. Artillery, Battery E =

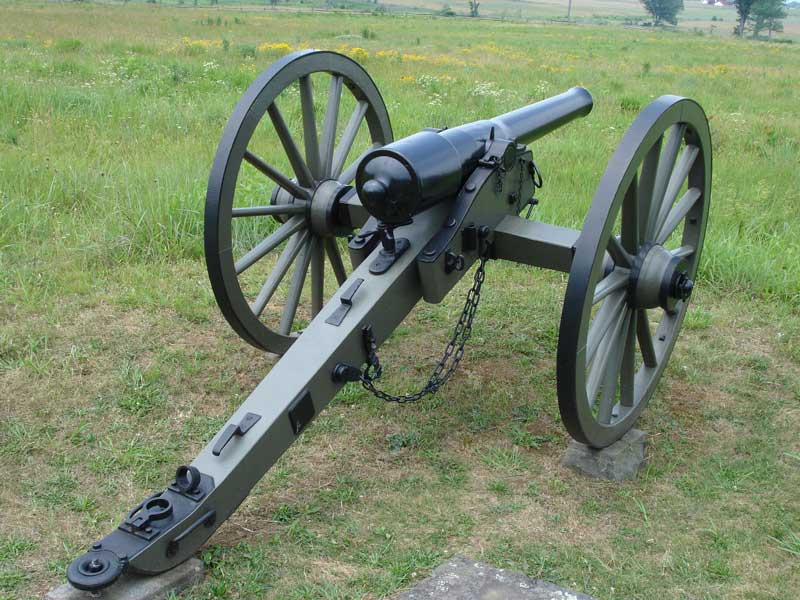
- Battery E was armed with four 10-pounder Parrott rifles at the Battle of Antietam.
- Country: United States
- Allegiance: (United States) Union
- Branch: Union Army
- Type: Field Artillery
- Size: Battery
- Equipment: Four 10-pounder Parrott rifles (1862)
- Engagements: American Civil War; First Battle of Kernstown (1862); Battle of Port Republic (1862); First Battle of Rappahannock Station (1862); Second Battle of Bull Run (1862); Battle of Chantilly (1862); Battle of Antietam (1862); Battle of Fredericksburg (1862); Battle of Chancellorsville (1863); Battle of Gettysburg (1863); Battle of Culpeper Court House (1863); Battle of Bristoe Station (1863); Battle of Mine Run (1863); Battle of the Wilderness (1864); Battle of Todd's Tavern (1864); Battle of Yellow Tavern (1864); Battle of Totopotomoy Creek (1864); Battle of Cold Harbor (1864); Wilson-Kautz Raid (1864); Third Battle of Winchester (1864); Battle of Fisher's Hill (1864); Battle of Cedar Creek (1864); Battle of Dinwiddie Court House (1865); Battle of Five Forks (1865); Battle of Sailor's Creek (1865); Battle of Appomattox Court House (1865)

Commanders
- Notable commanders: Joseph C. Clark; Samuel S. Elder

The 4th U.S. Artillery, Battery E was an artillery battery that served in the Union Army during the American Civil War. The unit fought at the battles of Kernstown, Port Republic, Rappahannock Station, Second Bull Run, Chantilly, Antietam, and Fredericksburg in 1862. The battery transferred to the Cavalry Corps where it served for the rest of the war. In 1863, 4th U.S. Artillery, Battery E fought at Chancellorsville, Gettysburg, Culpeper, Bristoe Station, and Mine Run. In 1864, the unit fought at the Wilderness, Todd's Tavern, Yellow Tavern, Totopotomoy, Cold Harbor, the Wilson-Kautz Raid, Opequon, Fisher's Hill, and Cedar Creek. In 1865, it saw action at Dinwiddie Court House, Five Forks, Sailor's Creek, and Appomattox before taking part in the Grand Review of the Armies.

== Service ==
Organized at Camp Monroe, Ohio, and joined Rosecrans in West Virginia. Attached to 2nd Brigade, Army of Occupation, West Virginia, to September, 1861. Scammon's Brigade, Dept. of West Virginia, to October, 1861. Kelly's Command, Railroad District, West Virginia, to January, 1862. Artillery, Lander's Division, Army of the Potomac, to March, 1862. Artillery, Shields' 2nd Division, Banks' 5th Army Corps, to April, 1862. Artillery, Shields' Division, Dept. of the Shenandoah, to May, 1862, and Dept. of the Rappahannock to June, 1862. Unattached Artillery, 3rd Corps, Army of Virginia, to September, 1862. Artillery, 2nd Division, 9th Army Corps, Army of the Potomac, to February, 1863. Reserve Brigade, 1st Cavalry Division, Cavalry Corps, Army of the Potomac, to May, 1863. 1st Brigade, Horse Artillery, Army of the Potomac, to August, 1864. Artillery, 1st Division, Cavalry Corps (Horse Artillery Reserve), Army of the Shenandoah, Middle Military Division, to March, 1865. Horse Artillery Reserve, attached to 3rd Division, Cavalry Corps, Army of the Shenandoah and Army of the Potomac, to May, 1865. Horse Artillery Brigade, 22nd Army Corps, to August, 1865.

== History ==
Duty in West Virginia until March, 1862. Advance on Winchester, Va., March 7–12. Battle of Winchester March 23. Occupation of Mt. Jackson April 17. March to Fredericksburg May 10–21, and return to Front Royal May 25–30. Battle of Port Republic June 8–9. Pope's Campaign in Northern Virginia August 16-September 2. Fords of the Rappahannock August 20–23. Bristoe Station August 27. Maryland Campaign September 6–22. Battle of Antietam, Md., September 16–17. Reconnaissance to Charlestown October 16–17. Charlestown October 16. Movement to Falmouth, Va., October 30-November 19. Battle of Fredericksburg, Va., December 12–15. "Mud March" January 20–24, 1863. Operations at Welford's, Kelly's and Beverly Fords April 14–15. Chancellorsville Campaign April 27-May 6. Brandy Station and Beverly Ford June 9. Hanover, Pa., June 30, Battle of Gettysburg, Pa., July 1–3. Hunterstown, Pa., July 4. Boonsboro, Md., July 8. Hagerstown July 10–13. Falling Waters July 14. Expedition to Port Conway September 1–3. Advance from the Rappahannock to the Rapidan September 13–17. Culpeper Court House September 13. Bristoe Campaign October 9–22. James City, Bethesda Church and near Culpeper October 10. Brandy Station October 11. Gainesville October 14. Groveton October 17–18. Gainesville, New Baltimore, Buckland's Mills and Haymarket October 19. Advance to line of the Rappahannock November 7–8. Mine Run Campaign November 26-December 2. Rapidan Campaign May 4-June 12, 1864. Craig's Meeting House May 5. Todd's Tavern May 5–6. Wilderness May 6–7. Sheridan's Raid to the James River May 9–24. North Anna River May 9. Ground Squirrel Church and Yellow Tavern May 11. Brook Church and fortifications of Richmond May 12. Strawberry Hill May 12. On line of the Pamunkey May 26–28. Totopotomoy May 28–31. Cold Harbor June 1–12. Totopotomoy June 2. Long Bridge June 12. Riddell's Shop and White Oak Swamp June 13. Siege of Petersburg June 16-August 5. Ream's Station June 22. Wilson's Raid on Southside & Danville Railroad June 22-July 1. Nottaway Court House June 23. Staunton River Bridge June 25. Sappony Church, Stony Creek, June 28–29. Ream's Station June 29. Sheridan's Shenandoah Valley Campaign August 7-November 28. Expedition from Winchester into Faquier and Loudoun Counties November 28-December 3. Expedition to Gordonsville December 19–28. Liberty Mills December 22. Sheridan's Raid from Winchester February 27-March 25, 1865. Occupation of Staunton and action at Waynesboro March 2. Duguidsville March 8. Appomattox Campaign March 28-April 9. Dinwiddie Court House March 30–31. Five Forks April 1. Scott's Cross Roads April 2. Tabernacle Church or Beaver Pond Creek April 4. Sailor's Creek April 6. Appomattox Station April 8. Appomattox Court House April 9. Surrender of Lee and his army. Expedition to Danville April 23–29. Moved to Washington, D.C., May. Grand Review May 23. Duty at Washington, D.C., until August.

== Armament ==
At the First Battle of Kernstown on 23 March 1862, 4th U.S. Artillery, Battery E was equipped with six 10-pounder Parrott rifles. Battery E had four 10-pounder Parrotts at the Battle of Antietam on 17 September. At Antietam, Clark's battery sustained losses of two killed and one wounded. Five days after the battle, the unit counted one officer and 52 enlisted men.

== See also ==
- List of United States Regular Army Civil War units
