= James Madison Robertson =

United States Admy officer (1817–1891)

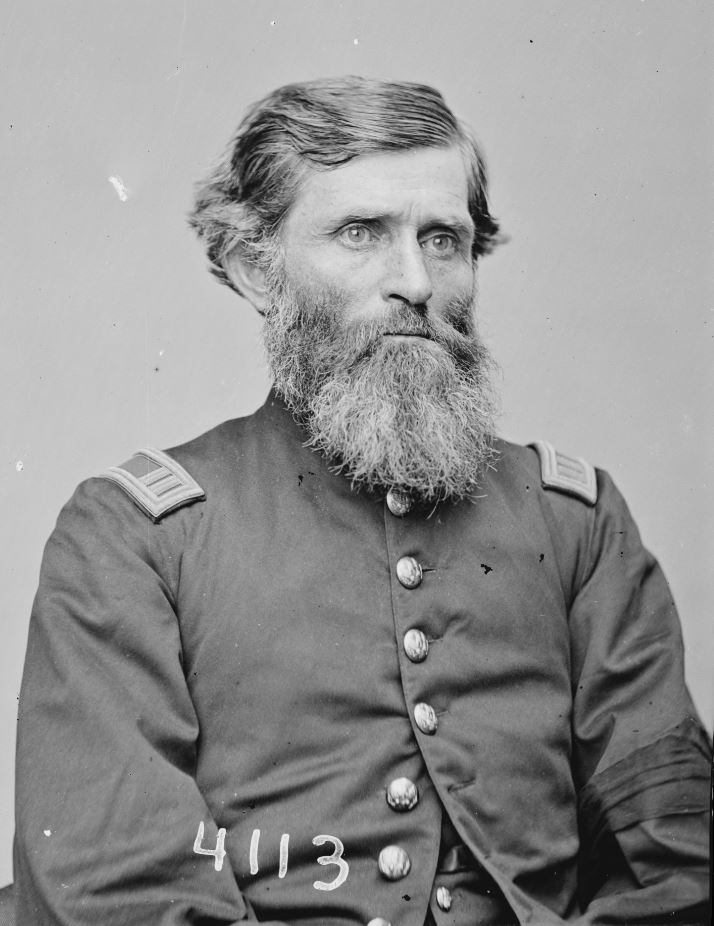
- Born: May 28, 1817; New Hampshire
- Died: January 21, 1891 (aged 73); Plattsburgh, New York
- Burial place: Riverside Cemetery; Plattsburgh, New York
- Military career
- Allegiance: United States of America; Union
- Branch: United States Army; Union Army
- Service years: 1838–1879
- Rank: Brevet Brigadier General
- Units: 2nd U.S. Artillery; 3rd U.S. Artillery
- Commands: U.S. Horse Artillery Brigade
- Conflicts: Mexican-American War Third Seminole War American Civil War

James Madison Robertson (also referred to as Robinson) (May 28, 1817 – January 21, 1891) was a career United States Army artillery officer who commanded the First Brigade of U.S. Horse Artillery during the American Civil War.

== Biography ==
=== Early life and career ===
Born in New Hampshire, Robertson enlisted in the U.S. Army in 1838. He served for ten years in Batteries F and H, 2nd U.S. Artillery. Ranking as a quartermaster sergeant during the Mexican–American War, Robertson received a field commission on June 28, 1848. He was promoted to first lieutenant in September 1852, and served in Florida during the Third Seminole War.

It appears possible that prior to 1854, Robertson used the surname "Robinson" and that sometime in 1854 he changed it to Robertson; while it is unclear, this is documented in Heitman's register of the United States Army, and he was often referred to erroneously as Robinson in contemporary documents.

=== Civil War service ===
In May 1861, Robertson received his captaincy as the Union Army expanded for the Civil War, and was assigned to command Battery B, 2nd U.S. Artillery. Battery B was soon combined with Battery L, 2nd U.S. to create the amalgamated Battery B & L, 2nd U.S. Artillery, armed with six 3-inch Ordnance rifles and attached to the U.S. Horse Artillery Brigade with the Artillery Reserve of the Army of the Potomac. He commanded the battery throughout the Peninsula Campaign in mid-1862, and received a brevet promotion to major for "gallant and meritorious service" at the Battle of Gaines' Mill.

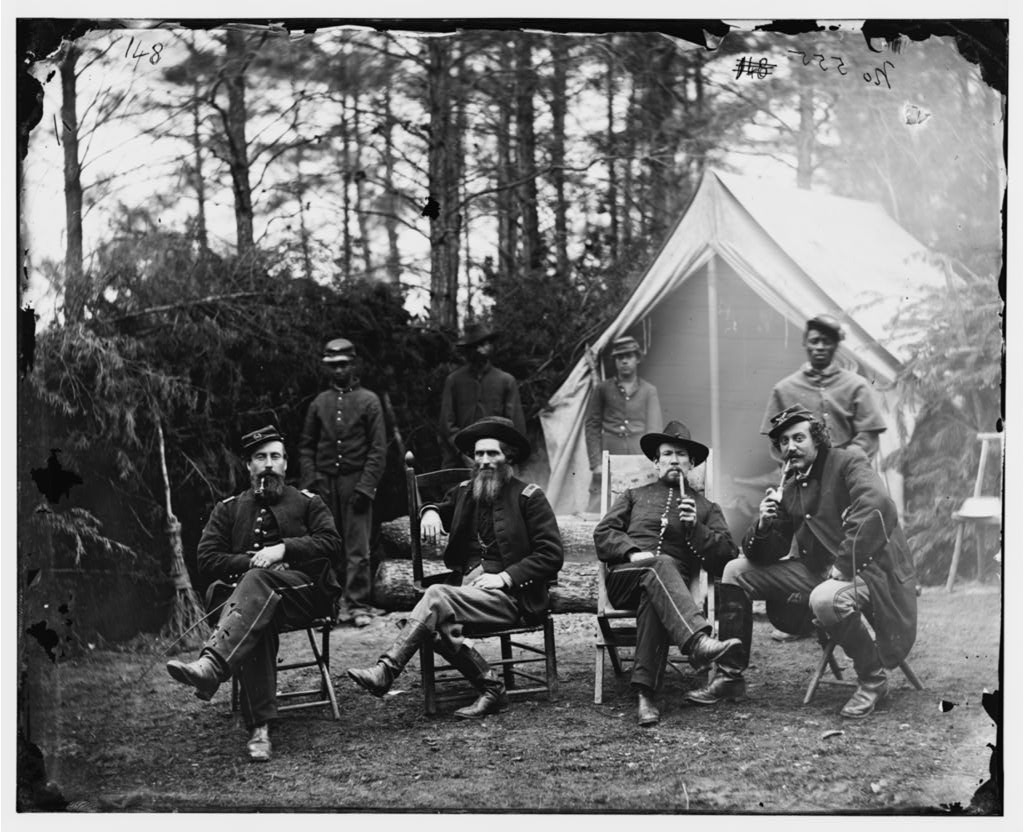
Brevet Lieutenant Colonel Robertson (2nd seated from left) and staff of the First Brigade, U.S. Horse Artillery in winter quarters, 1863-64.

Robertson succeeded Lieutenant Colonel William Hays as the commander of the First Brigade of U.S. Horse Artillery attached to the Union Cavalry Corps following the reorganization of the Artillery Reserve (after the Peninsula Campaign but prior to the Battle of Chancellorsville) and held that position through the remainder of the war. Engaged in most of the major battles in the Eastern Theater, he received a brevet promotion to lieutenant colonel for services at the Battle of Gettysburg on July 3, 1863.

During the Wilderness Campaign of 1864, the First Brigade of the U.S. Horse Artillery was attached to Brigadier General Philip Sheridan's Cavalry Corps, and Robertson was awarded a brevet promotion to colonel on May 31, 1864, for "gallant and meritorious service" at the Battle of Cold Harbor.

At the end of the Civil War, Robertson was awarded a brevet promotion to the rank of brigadier general for services in command of the Horse Artillery Brigade throughout the Wilderness Campaign. On June 30, 1866, President Andrew Johnson nominated Robertson for appointment to the grade of brevet brigadier general of volunteers, to rank from March 13, 1865, and the United States Senate confirmed the appointment on July 25, 1866.

=== Post War ===
After the war, Robertson returned to his permanent rank of captain in the Regular Army with the 2nd U.S. Artillery, and earned a promotion to major in June 1874.

He transferred to the 3rd U.S. Artillery in 1875, and retired in 1879.

Robertson was married to Frances O. Fouquet (1837-1926). He died on January 21, 1891, in Plattsburgh, New York.

== See also ==
- List of American Civil War brevet generals (Union)
