= U.S. Horse Artillery Brigade =

Military unit in the American Civil War

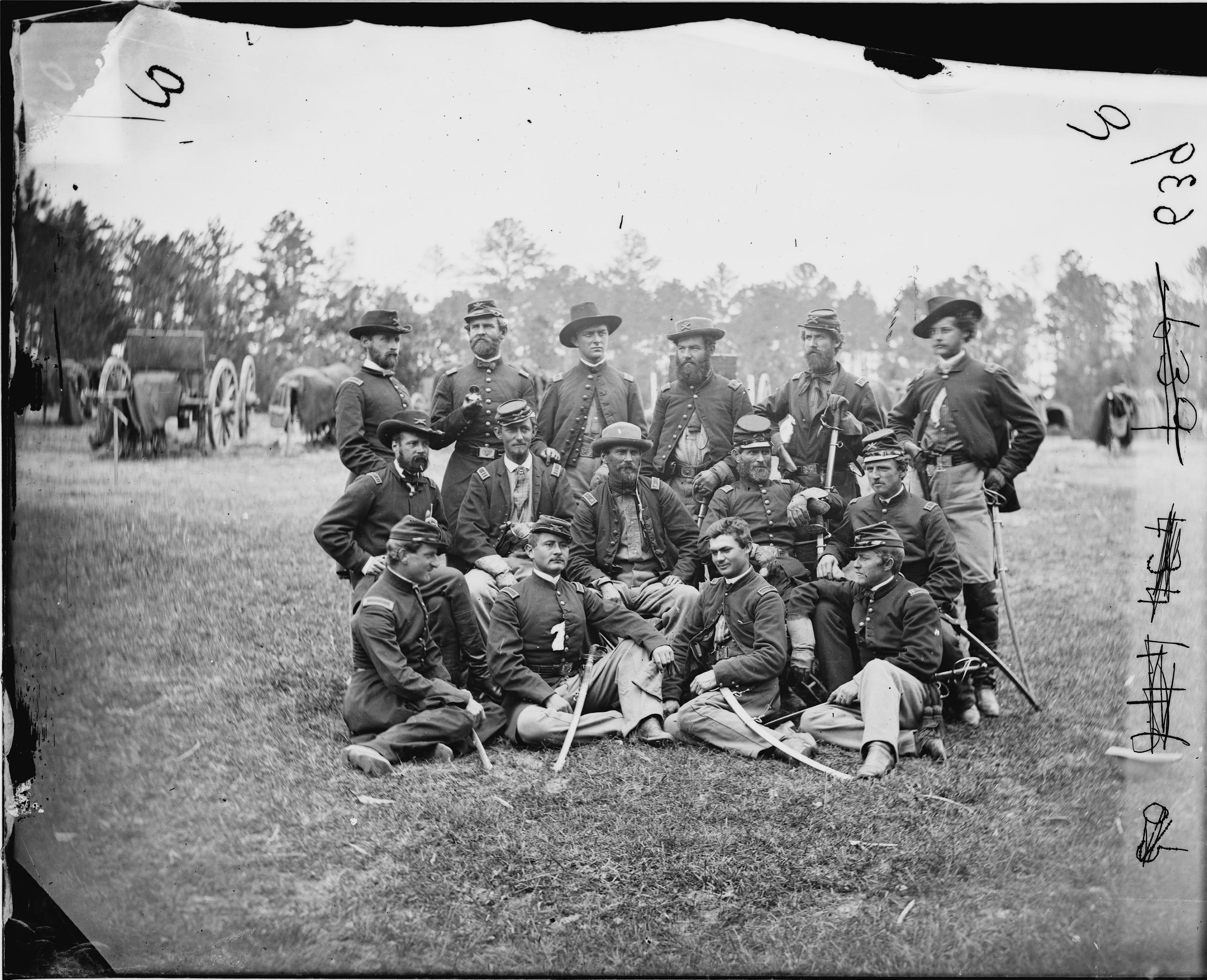
Officers of the Horse Artillery Brigade at Fair Oaks, 1862. Photo by James F. Gibson. Library of Congress.

The Horse Artillery Brigade of the Army of the Potomac was a brigade of various batteries of horse artillery during the American Civil War.

Made up almost entirely of individual, company-strength batteries from the Regular Army's five artillery regiments, the Horse Artillery operated under the command umbrella of the Cavalry Corps. The Horse Artillery differed from other light artillery (also known as "mounted" artillery) in that each member of the unit traveled on his own horse, rather than the traditional light artillery practice of "drivers" riding horses pulling the guns, while the cannoneers rode on the limbers and caissons. Ordinarily, though, the cannoneers traveled on foot behind their respective gun. But, with each man on his own horse, the unit could travel faster and more efficiently. It was the brainchild of former artillery captain and Brig. Gen. William Farquhar Barry, Chief of Artillery for the Army of the Potomac, in 1861. With such a large percentage of the U.S. Horse Artillery being artillery batteries from the regular U.S. Army, it developed a superb reputation for military efficiency, accuracy of fire, and command presence in the field and in battle. These mobile artillery units were typically equipped with 3-inch Ordnance rifles, known for their reliability and accuracy.

Originally under the direct command of Lt. Col. (and future Brigadier General) William Hays, and later under the two-brigade command of captains James Madison Robertson and John C. Tidball, the Horse Artillery served with distinction during most of the major engagements in the Eastern Theater. Tidball's brigade later was commanded by Capt Dunbar R. Ransom.

It is notable that each of these men - Barry, Hays, Robertson, and Tidball - came from the officers corps of the 2nd Regiment of Artillery. One of their chief champions, Henry Jackson Hunt, commanded the Reserve Artillery in the Army of the Potomac, and was also an officer of the 2nd U.S. Artillery.

== Organization ==
=== 1862 - Peninsula Campaign ===
Commander: Lieutenant Colonel William Hays, USV (Captain, USA, 2nd U.S. Artillery), of Tennessee

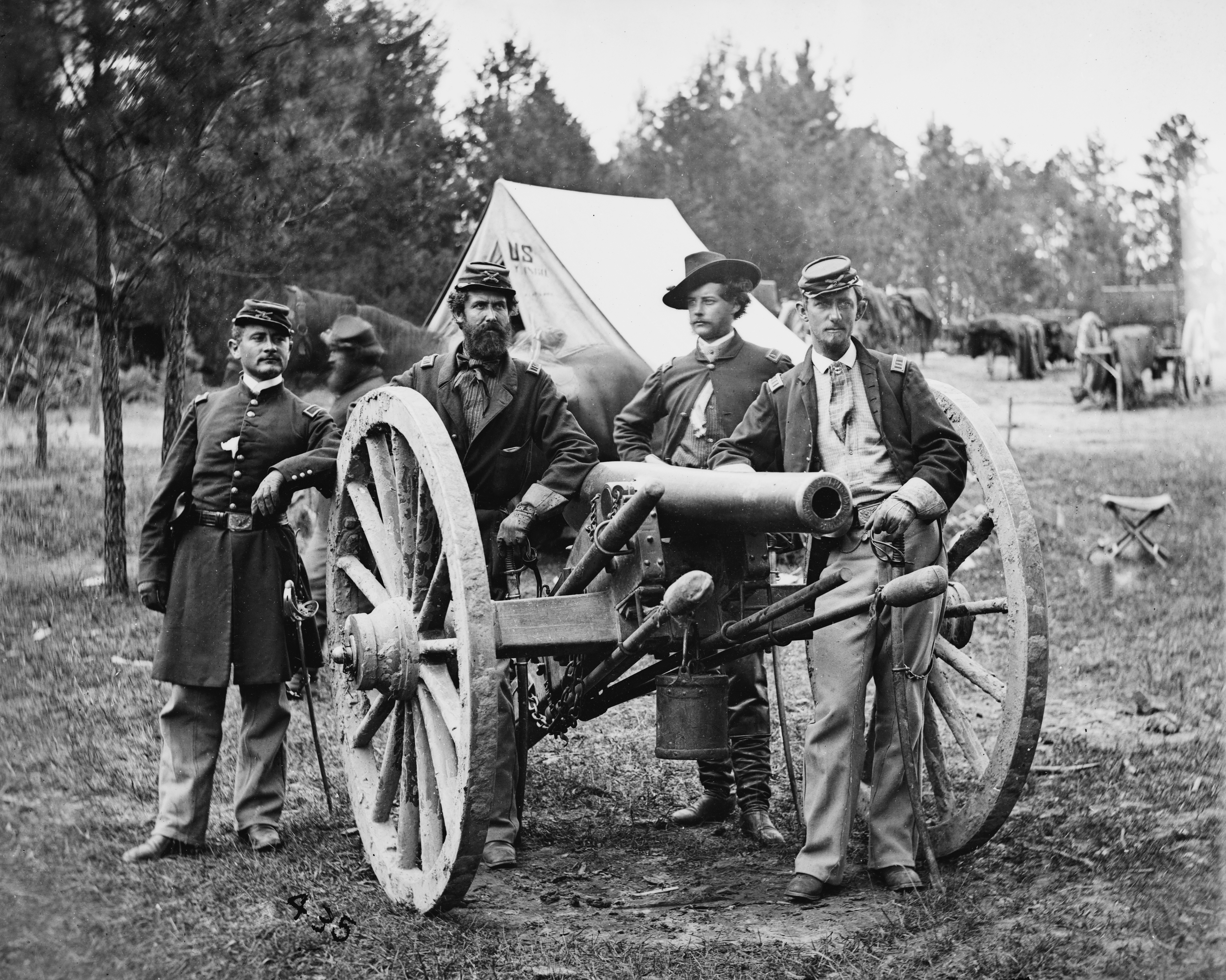
Officers of Battery A, 2nd U.S. Artillery, 1862. L-R: Clarke, Tidball, Dennison, Pennington. Photo by James F. Gibson. Library of Congress

Battery A, 2nd U.S. Artillery (2nd Regiment of Artillery)

Commander: Captain John C. Tidball, USA, of Ohio

- Lead (Right) Section Chief: First Lieutenant Alexander Cummings McWhorter Pennington, Jr., USA, of New Jersey
- Rear (Left) Section Chief: First Lieutenant William Neil Dennison, USA, of Ohio
- Center Section Chief: Second Lieutenant Robert Clarke, USA, of Pennsylvania
- Chief of Line of Caissons: First Sergeant Frank

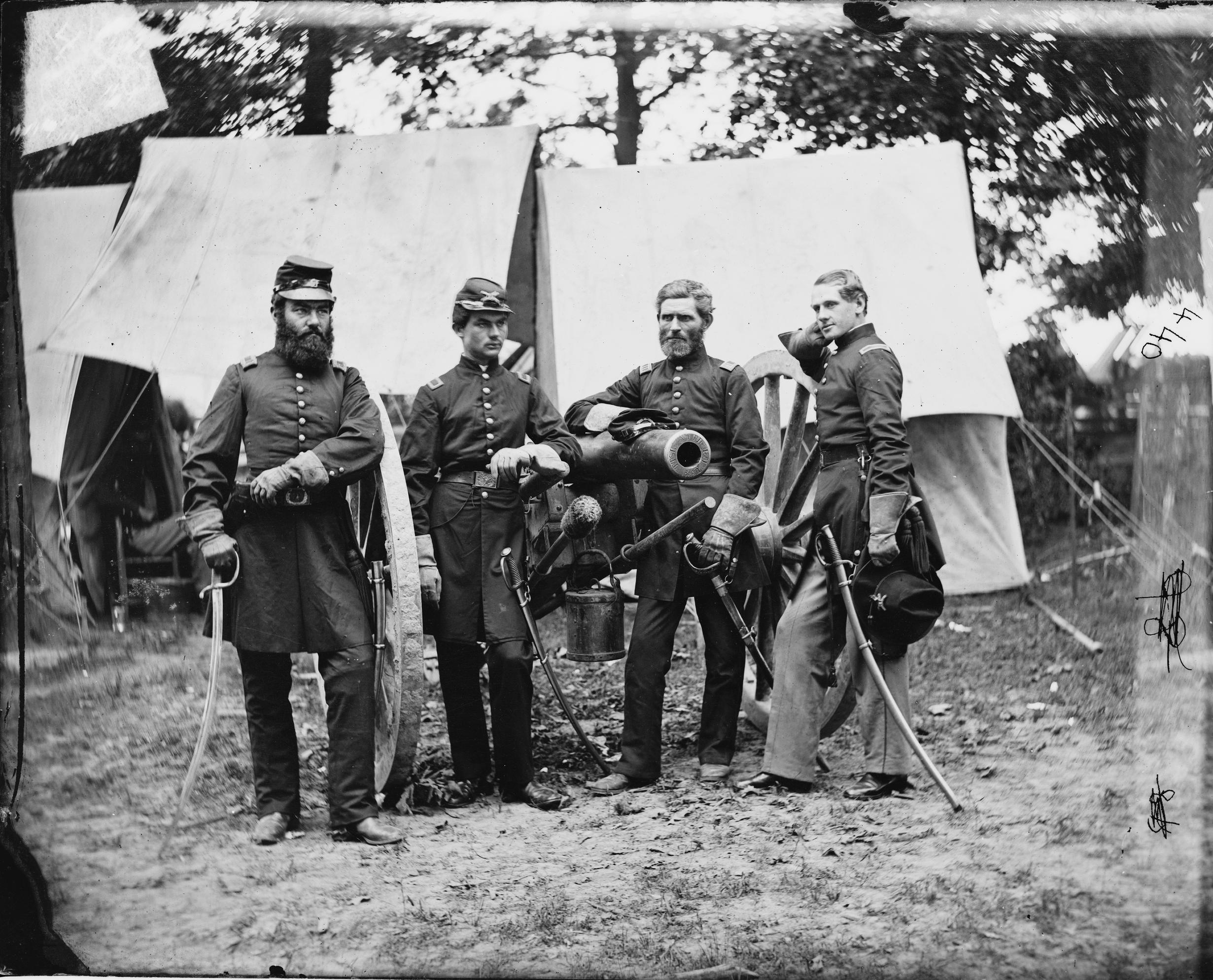
Officers of Combined Batteries B & L, 2nd U.S. Artillery, 1862. L-R: Wilson, Vincent, Robertson, Woodruff. Photo by James F. Gibson. Library of Congress

Battery B & L, 2nd U.S. Artillery

Commander: Captain James Madison Robertson, USA, of New Hampshire

- Lead (Right) Section Chief: First Lieutenant John Moulder Wilson, USA, of Washington, DC
- Rear (Left) Section Chief: Second Lieutenant Carle Augustus Woodruff, USA, of New York
- Center Section Chief: Second Lieutenant Albert Oliver Vincent, USA, of Ohio
- Chief of Line of Caissons: First Lieutenant Perry Bly, 9th New York Cavalry (on TDY)

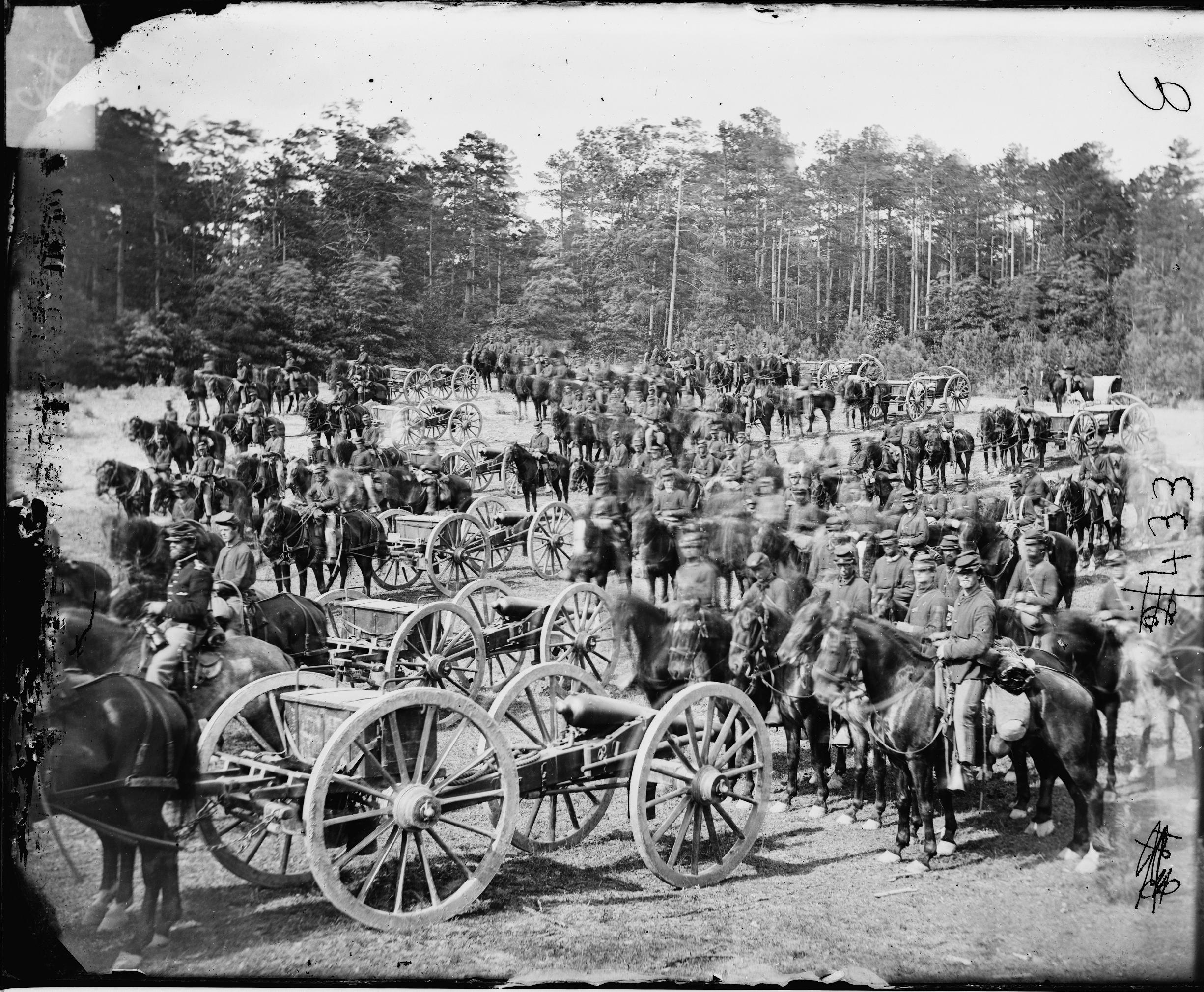
Battery M, 2nd U.S. Artillery, 1862. Photo by James F. Gibson. Library of Congress

Battery M, 2nd U.S. Artillery

Commander: Captain Henry Benson, USA, of New Jersey

- Lead (right) Section – First Lieutenant John Whitney Barlow, USA, of New York
- Rear (left) Section – First Lieutenant Peter Conover Hains, USA, of New Jersey
- Center Section – Second Lieutenant Robert Hunter Chapin, USA, of New York

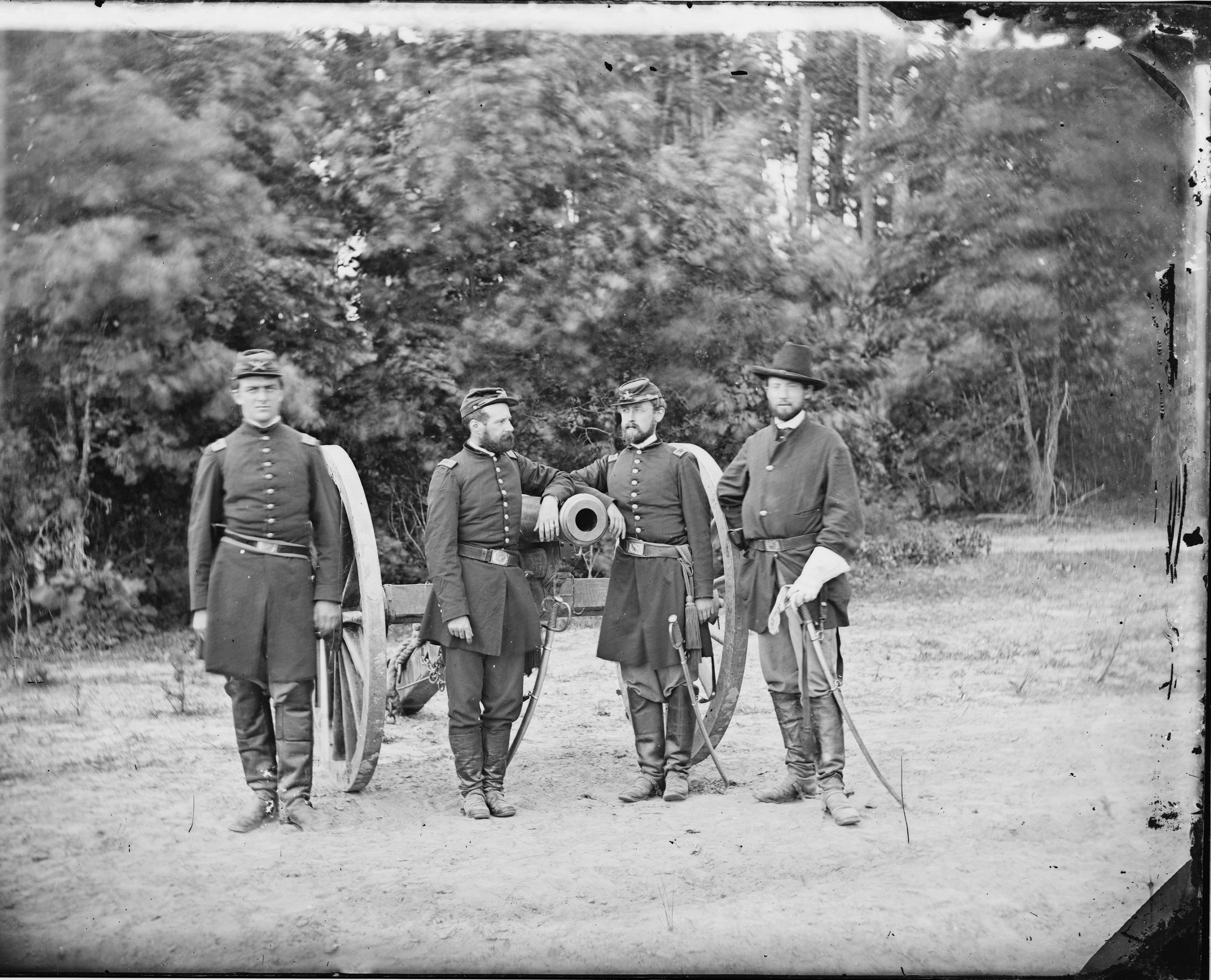
Officers of Battery C, 3rd U.S. Artillery, 1862. L-R: Meinell, Gibson, Pendleton, and Fuller. Photo by James F. Gibson. Library of Congress

Battery C, 3rd U.S. Artillery

Commander: Captain Horatio Gates Gibson, USA, of Pennsylvania

- Lead (Right) Section Chief: First Lieutenant William Duncan Fuller, USA, of Maine
- Rear (Left) Section Chief: First Lieutenant Edmund Pendleton, USA, of Virginia
- Center Section Chief: First Lieutenant Henry Meinell, USA, of New York
- Chiefs of Line of Caissons: Second Lieutenant William D'Wolf, USA, of Illinois, (mortally wounded at Williamsburg, May 4, 1862; Died of wounds, June 3, 1862); Second Lieutenant Francis Lowell Dutton Russell, USA, of Massachusetts (on TDY from 4th US Artillery)
- Battery Wagon & Forge: Lieutenant J.W. Upham, 9th New York Cavalry (on TDY)

=== 1863 - Gettysburg Campaign ===
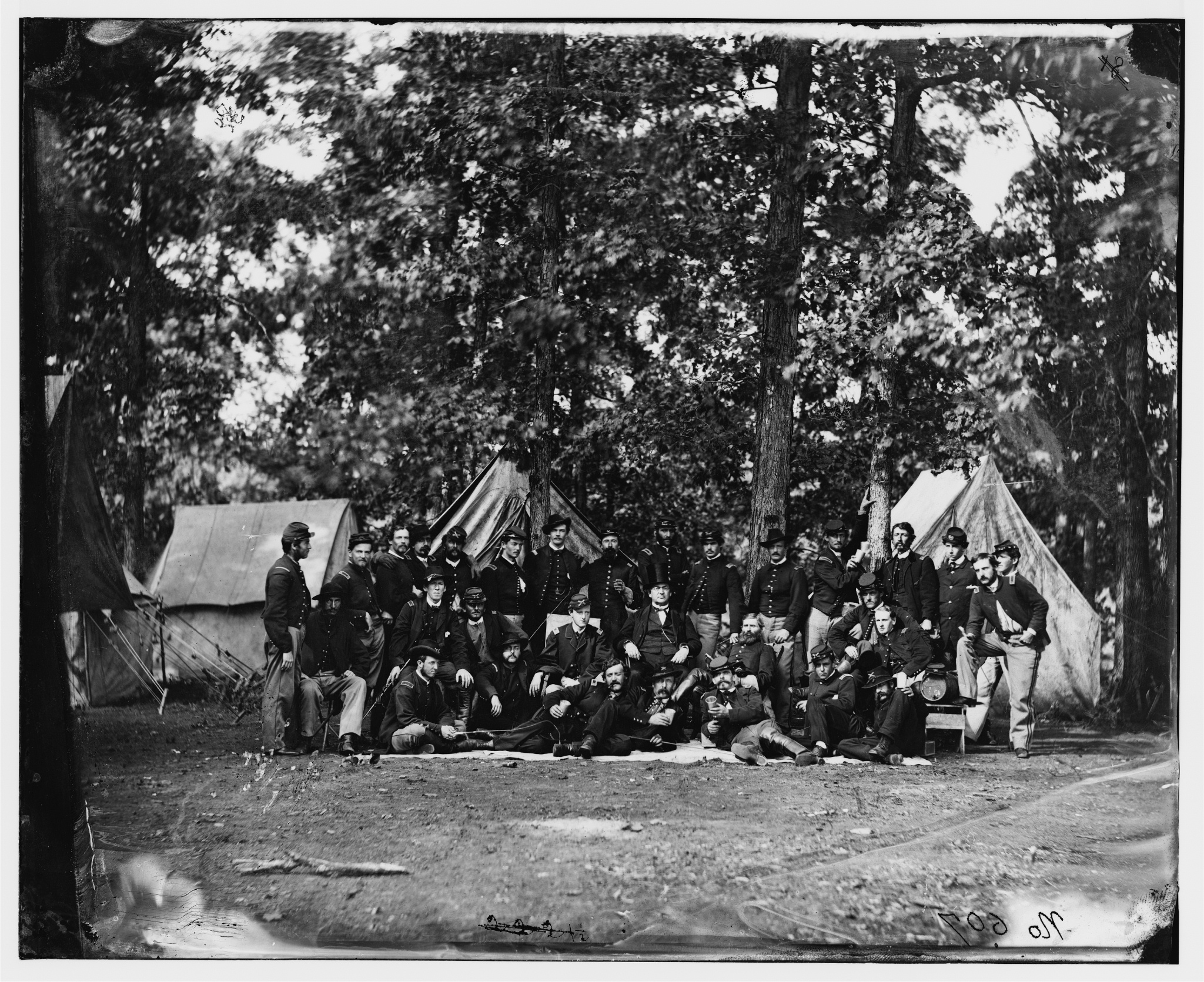
Officers of the Horse Artillery at Culpeper, September 1863. Library of Congress

==== First Brigade, Horse Artillery ====
Commander: Captain James Madison Robertson, USA

Acting Assistant Adjutant General: First Lieutenant J.H. Bell, 6th New York Cavalry

Batteries of the First Brigade:

9th Michigan Battery, US Volunteers (6 - 3-inch Ordnance rifles)

Commander: Captain Jabez James Daniels, USV

- Lead (right) Section Chief: First Lieutenant Addison Kidder, USV
- Rear (left) Section Chief: First Lieutenant Luther R. Smith, USV
- Center Section Chief: Lt. Lewis R Rage, USV
- Chief of Line of Caissons: Second Lieutenant Thomas J. Lumbocker, USV(?)

Independent Battery, 6th New York Light Artillery, US Volunteers (6 - 3-inch Ordnance rifles) (formerly the Artillery Company K, 9th New York State Militia, and the 83rd New York Infantry Regiment)

Commander: Captain Joseph W. Martin, USV

- Lead (Right) Section Chief: First Lieutenant Moses P. Clark, USV
- Rear (Left) Section Chief: Second Lieutenant J. Wade Wilson, USV
- Center Section Chief: First Sergeant James E. Tileson, USV

Batteries B & L, 2nd US Artillery (6 - 3-inch Ordnance rifles)

Commander: First Lieutenant Edward Heaton, USA

Battery M, 2nd US Artillery (6 - 3-inch Ordnance rifles)

Commander: First Lieutenant Alexander Cummings McWhorter Pennington, Jr., USA

Battery E, 4th US Artillery (4 -3-inch Ordnance rifles)

Commander: First Lieutenant Samuel Sherer Elder, USA

==== Second Brigade, Horse Artillery ====
Commander: Captain John Caldwell Tidball, USA

Batteries of the Second Brigade:

Battery E & G, 1st US Artillery (4 - 3-inch Ordnance rifles)

Commander: Captain Alanson Merwin Randol, USA

- Lead (Right) Section Chief: Second Lieutenant James Chester, USA
- Rear (Left) Section Chief: Second Lieutenant Ernest L. Kinney, USA

1st U.S. Light Artillery, Battery K (6 - 3-inch Ordnance rifles)

Commander: Captain William Montrose Graham, USA

- Lead (Right) Section Chief: First Lieutenant Theophie Bhyrd von Michalowski, USA

Battery A, 2nd U.S. Artillery (6 - 3-inch Ordnance rifles)

Commander: Second Lieutenant John Haskell Calef, USA

- Lead (Right) Section Chief: Second Lieutenant John William Roder, USA
- Rear (left) Section Chief: First Sergeant Joseph Newman, USA
- Center Section Chief: Sergeant Charles Pergel, USA

Battery C, 3rd US Artillery (6 - 3-inch Ordnance Rifles)*

Commander: First Lieutenant William Duncan Fuller, USA

- Lead (Right) Section Chief: First Lieutenant Henry Meinell, USA
- Rear (Left) Section Chief: First Lieutenant James Rigney Kelly, USA
- Center Section Chief: Second Lieutenant James Madison Lancaster, USA
- First Sergeant – First Sergeant Daniel Munger, USA

Light Battery H, 3rd Pennsylvania Heavy Artillery, US Volunteers (2 - 3-inch Ordnance rifles)

Commander: Captain William D. Rank, USV

- Lead (Right) Section Chief: William M. Runkel, USV
- Rear (Left) Section Chief: Thomas B. Nelson, USV
- Center Section Chief: Second Lieutenant John A. Light, USV

*Note: Battery C, 3rd US Artillery was not present during the battle of Gettysburg

=== 1864 - Overland Campaign ===
The Horse Artillery remained organized into two brigades until June, when it was reduced to one. The units that were cut from the ranks left their best equipment with the remaining units, and reported to Washington, DC for further orders, elsewhere. The following are the final list of command and staff and order of battle of the larger organization and the list for the reduced roster.

=== January – June, 1864 ===
==== First Brigade, Horse Artillery ====
Commander: Captain James Madison Robertson, USA (Brevet Colonel)

Quartermaster: Captain William Goldie, USV (formerly Captain, 56th Illinois Infantry)

Commissary of Subsistence: Captain Henry Loud Cranford, USV (formerly First Lieutenant, 84th New York Infantry)

Organization:

9th Battery, Michigan Light Artillery

Commander: Captain Jabez Daniels, USV

6th Independent Battery, New York Light Artillery

Commander: Captain Joseph W. Martin, USV

Batteries B & L, 2nd U.S. Artillery

Commander: First Lieutenant Edward Heaton, USA

Battery D, 2nd U.S. Artillery

Commander: First Lieutenant (Brevet Major) Edward Bancroft Williston, USA

Battery M, 2nd U.S. Artillery

Commander: First Lieutenant (Brevet Major) Alexander Cummings McWhorter Pennington, Jr., USA

Battery A, 4th U.S. Artillery

Commander: First Lieutenant (Brevet Captain) Rufus King, Jr., USA

Battery E, 4th U.S. Artillery

Commander: Captain Samuel Elder, USA

==== Second Brigade, Horse Artillery ====
Commander: Captain John Caldwell Tidball, USA (Brevet Lieutenant Colonel, USA; Colonel, 4th New York Artillery, USV)

Quartermaster: Captain Ira F. Payson, USV (died, July 30, 1864)

Commissary of Subsistence: First Lieutenant (Brevet Captain) William Murray Maynadier, USA

Organization:

Battery E & G, 1st U.S. Artillery

Commander: First Lieutenant Frank Sands French, USA

Battery K, 1st U.S. Artillery

Commander: Captain (Brevet Lieutenant Colonel) William Montrose Graham, USA

Battery A, 2nd U.S. Artillery

Commander: First Lieutenant Robert Clarke, USA

Section Chiefs: First Lieutenants John H. Calef, USA; N.A. Cameron, USV (TDY from 4th New York Heavy Artillery); and B.J. (Benjamin Franklin) Littlefield, USV (former US Sharpshooter, on TDY from 4th New York Heavy Artillery)

Battery G, 2nd U.S. Artillery

Commander: First Lieutenant (Brevet Major) John Hartwell Butler, USA

Battery C, 3rd U.S. Artillery

Commander: First Lieutenant (Brevet Major) William Duncan Fuller, USA

=== From June 1864 ===
==== Horse Artillery Reserve, Army of the Potomac ====
Commander – Captain (Brevet Colonel) James M. Robertson, USA

Organization:

Batteries H & I, 1st U.S. Artillery

Commander: Captain (Brevet Major) Alanson M. Randol, USA

Battery K, 1st U.S. Artillery

Commander: First Lieutenant (Brevet Major) John Egan, USA

Battery A, 2nd U.S. Artillery

Commander: First Lieutenant Robert Clarke, USA

Batteries B&L, 2nd U.S. Artillery

Commander: First Lieutenant Edward Heaton, USA

Battery D, 2nd U.S. Artillery

Commander: First Lieutenant (Brevet Lieutenant Colonel) Edward B. Williston, USA

Battery M, 2nd U.S. Artillery

Commander: First Lieutenant (Brevet Major) Alexander C.M. Pennington, Jr., USA

Batteries C, F,&K, 3rd U.S. Artillery

Commander: First Lieutenant (Brevet Major) James Rigney Kelly, USA (formerly enlisted Engineers Artificer and later enlisted 3rd Artillery Sergeant)

Batteries C&E, 4th U.S. Artillery

Commander: First Lieutenant Charles Lane Fitzhugh, USA, (later Colonel, 6th New York Cavalry and Brevet Brigadier General, USA and USV)

==== Units separated & sent to Washington, D.C. for further orders ====
Batteries E & G, 1st U.S. Artillery

Commander: First Lieutenant David Essex Porter, USA

Battery G, 2nd U.S. Artillery

Commander: First Lieutenant (Brevet Major) William Neil Dennison, USA

Battery A, 4th U.S. Artillery

Commander: First Lieutenant Rufus King, Jr., USA

6th New York Independent Battery

Commander: Captain Joseph W. Martin, USV

=== 1865 ===
By 1865, the Horse Artillery Brigade still existed on paper, but the various units were dispersed and assigned to a number of commands, as was the typical practice of regular foot artillery in the field.

== See also ==
- Field Artillery Branch (United States)
