= 2nd Ohio Heavy Artillery Regiment =

- Active: 20 July 1863 to 23 August 1865
- Country: United States
- Allegiance: Union
- Branch: Heavy artillery

2nd Ohio Heavy Artillery Regiment was an artillery regiment that served in the Union Army during the American Civil War.

== Service ==
The 2nd Ohio Heavy Artillery Regiment was organized at Camp Dennison near Cincinnati, Ohio and Covington, Kentucky. Companies were mustered in for three years service under the command of Colonel Horatio Gates Gibson. Company A mustered on 20 July 1863; Company B mustered on 5 August 1863; Company C mustered on 26 August 1863; Companies D, H, I, K, and L mustered on 7 September 1863; Companies E and M mustered on 9 September 1863; Company G mustered on 19 September 1863; and Company F mustered on 23 September 1863.

The regiment served by detachments until May 1864. It was attached to District of Kentucky, Department of the Ohio, to May 1864. Cleveland, Tennessee, Department of the Ohio, to October 1864. 2nd Brigade, 4th Division, XXIII Corps, Department of the Ohio, to February 1864. 2nd Brigade, 4th Division, District of East Tennessee, Department of the Cumberland, to March 1865. 1st Brigade, 4th Division, District of East Tennessee, to August 1865.

The 2nd Ohio Heavy Artillery mustered out 23 August 1865.

== Detailed service ==
Company A moved to Covington, Ky. 19 August 1863, then to Fort Jones, Muldraugh's Hill, Ky. 11 October, and duty there until 10 January 1864. At Fort DeWolf, near Shepherdsville, until May. Moved to Cleveland, Tenn., 24 May. Company B moved to Covington Barracks 19 August, then to Bowling Green, Ky., 5 September, and duty there until 26 May 1864. Moved to Charleston, Tenn., 26 May. Company D moved to Muldraugh's Hill, Ky., and duty at Fort Saunders until 26 May 1864. Garrison at Tyner's Station until 9 October 1864, then joined Regiment at Loudoun, Tenn. Company E moved to Muldraugh's Hill and garrison Fort Boyle until 26 May 1864. Moved to Cleveland, Tenn., 26 May 1864. Company F moved to Bowling Green, Ky., and duty there until 26 May 1864. Moved to Charleston, Tenn., 26 May. Company G on duty at Bowling Green until 26 May 1864. Moved to Charleston, Tenn., 26 May. Company H moved to Munfordville, Ky. 11 October 1863, and garrison duty at Battery McConnell until 26 May 1864. Moved to Cleveland, Tenn., 26 May. Company I moved to Shepherdsville and duty at Fort DeWolf until 10 January 1864, and at Fort Nelson until 26 May. Moved to Cleveland 26 May 1864. Company K moved to Munfordville 11 October and duty there until 26 May 1864. Moved to Charleston, Tenn., 26 May. Company L moved to Frankfort, Ky., 11 October 1863, and duty at Fort Boone until December. At Battery Simons, Munfordville, until 26 May 1864. Moved to Cleveland, Tenn., 26 May. Company M moved to Munfordville, Ky., 18 September 1863, and garrison duty at Fort Willich until 10 January 1864, and at Fort Taylor, Camp Nelson, until 26 May. Moved to Cleveland, Tenn., 26 May. Duty at Cleveland, Tenn., until October 1864 (Companies A, E, H, I, L, and M). At Charleston, Tenn., until August 1864 (Companies B, C, F, G, and K); then at Cleveland until October. Action with Wheeler near Cleveland 17 August. Charleston 19 August. Pursuit of Wheeler 22–28 August. Moved to Loudoun, Tenn., 9 October, and duty there until 18 November. Morristown 13 November. Russellsville 14 November. Tillson's movement to Strawberry Plains, Tenn., 16–17 November. Flat Creek 17 November. At Knoxville until 7 December. Ammon's Expedition to Bean's Station 7–29 December (Company A on duty at Knoxville until 9 January 1865.) At Camp Rothrock and Fort Saunders until August. Company B on duty at Knoxville, Camp Rothrock, and Fort Saunders until August. Companies C, D, E, and F at Knoxville, Camp Rothrock, and Loudoun until August. Company G at Nashville until 1 February 1865, and at Athens until August. Skirmish at Athens 16 February 1865 (detachment). Sweetwater 16 February (detachment). Company H at Strawberry Plains until August. Company I at Fort Gilpin, Knoxville, until August. Company K at Clinch Gap until 21 December 1864, at Fort Lee Knoxville, and at Greenville until August. Company L at Knoxville until August 1865. Company M at Athens until August 1865.

== Casualties ==
The regiment lost a total of 176 men during service; 1 officer and 2 enlisted men killed or mortally wounded, 3 officers and 170 enlisted men died of disease.

== Commanders ==
- Colonel Horatio Gates Gibson

== See also ==
- List of Ohio Civil War units
- Ohio in the Civil War
