= Horatio Gates Gibson =

Union Army General (1827–1924)

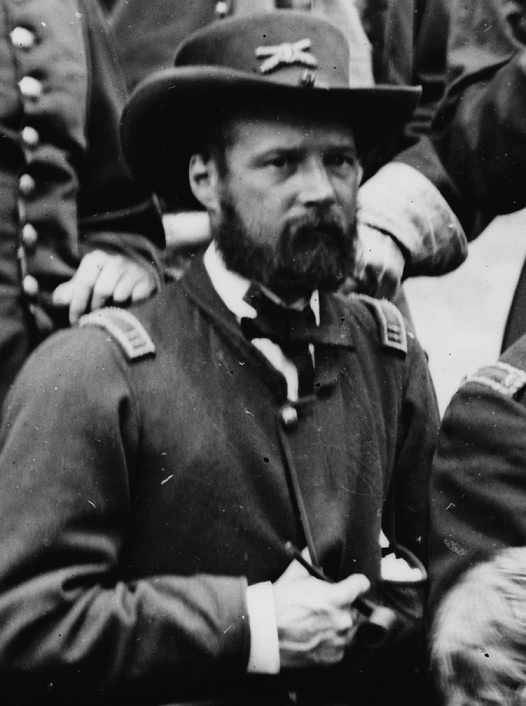
- Gibson in 1862.
- Born: May 22, 1827; Baltimore, Maryland
- Died: April 18, 1924 (aged 96); Washington, D.C.
- Military career
- Allegiance: United States of America; Union
- Branch: United States Army; Union Army
- Service years: 1847–1891
- Rank: Brigadier General; Brevet Brigadier General
- Commands: 2nd Ohio Heavy Artillery; 3rd U.S. Artillery Regiment
- Conflicts: American Civil War

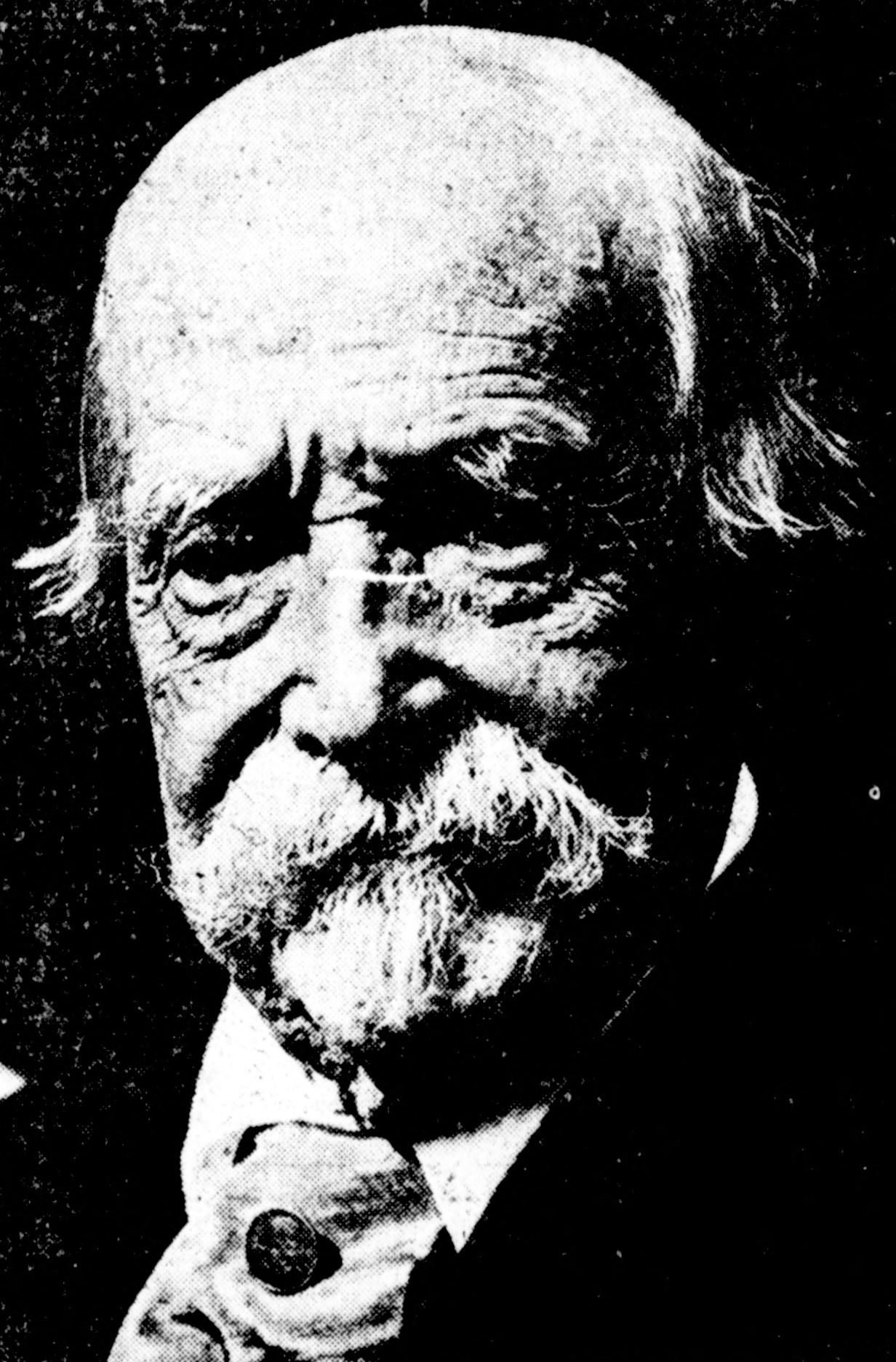
Gibson on his 93rd birthday, in May 1920.

Horatio Gates Gibson (May 22, 1827 – April 18, 1924) was a career artillery officer in the United States Army, and colonel in the American Civil War. In 1866, he was nominated and confirmed for appointment as a brevet brigadier general of volunteers to rank from March 13, 1865.

== Biography ==
Born in Baltimore, Maryland, Gibson attended the United States Military Academy at West Point, New York, and graduated seventeenth in the Class of 1847. Commissioned into the 3rd Regiment of Artillery, he rose slowly through the peacetime army, eventually earning his captaincy at the outbreak of the Civil War.

During the war, he commanded Battery C, 3rd U.S. Artillery, and was part of the famed U.S. Horse Artillery Brigade in the Army of the Potomac. Cited for gallantry, he was awarded brevet (honorary) promotions to major (May 5, 1862, for actions at Williamsburg) and lieutenant colonel (September 17, 1862, for actions at Antietam). By 1863, he accepted a commission in the U.S. Volunteers and commanded the 2nd Ohio Artillery as a lieutenant colonel and colonel. At the end of the war, Gibson was awarded a brevet appointment as colonel in the Regular Army. On January 13, 1866, President Andrew Johnson nominated Gibson for appointment to the grade of brevet brigadier general of volunteers, to rank from March 13, 1865, and the United States Senate confirmed the appointment on March 12, 1866.

Mustering out of the volunteers in August 1865, Gibson returned to his permanent rank of captain in the 3rd Artillery in the regular army. He remained in the army, and was promoted to major in 1867, lieutenant colonel in 1882, and colonel in 1883. He retired from the service on May 22, 1891.

Following an act of Congress on April 23, 1904, Gibson was promoted one grade from colonel to the rank of brigadier general on the retired list, due to his service in the Civil War and more than forty years in the United States Army.

Gibson died on April 18, 1924.

Time Magazine's obituary of him (Monday, April 28, 1924) cited the following:

Died. Brigadier General Horatio Gates Gibson, 97, "oldest living West Pointer"; in Washington. He entered just as Ulysses S. Grant graduated. Due to his slight stature, he was nicknamed "Agnes"—an appellation which clung to him through life. When he was a lieutenant at the battle of Fredericksburg, his sword was cut from his side by a shell; at the end of the Civil War he was a captain in the regulars. A nonagenarian at his daughter's house in Washington, he smoked from six to ten cigars daily.

General Gibson was a member of the Aztec Club of 1847 and served as its president in 1913, 1916 to 1919 and in 1921. He was the last veteran of the Mexican War to serve as the club's president.

== See also ==
- List of American Civil War brevet generals (Union)
