= Morris Schaff =

American historian

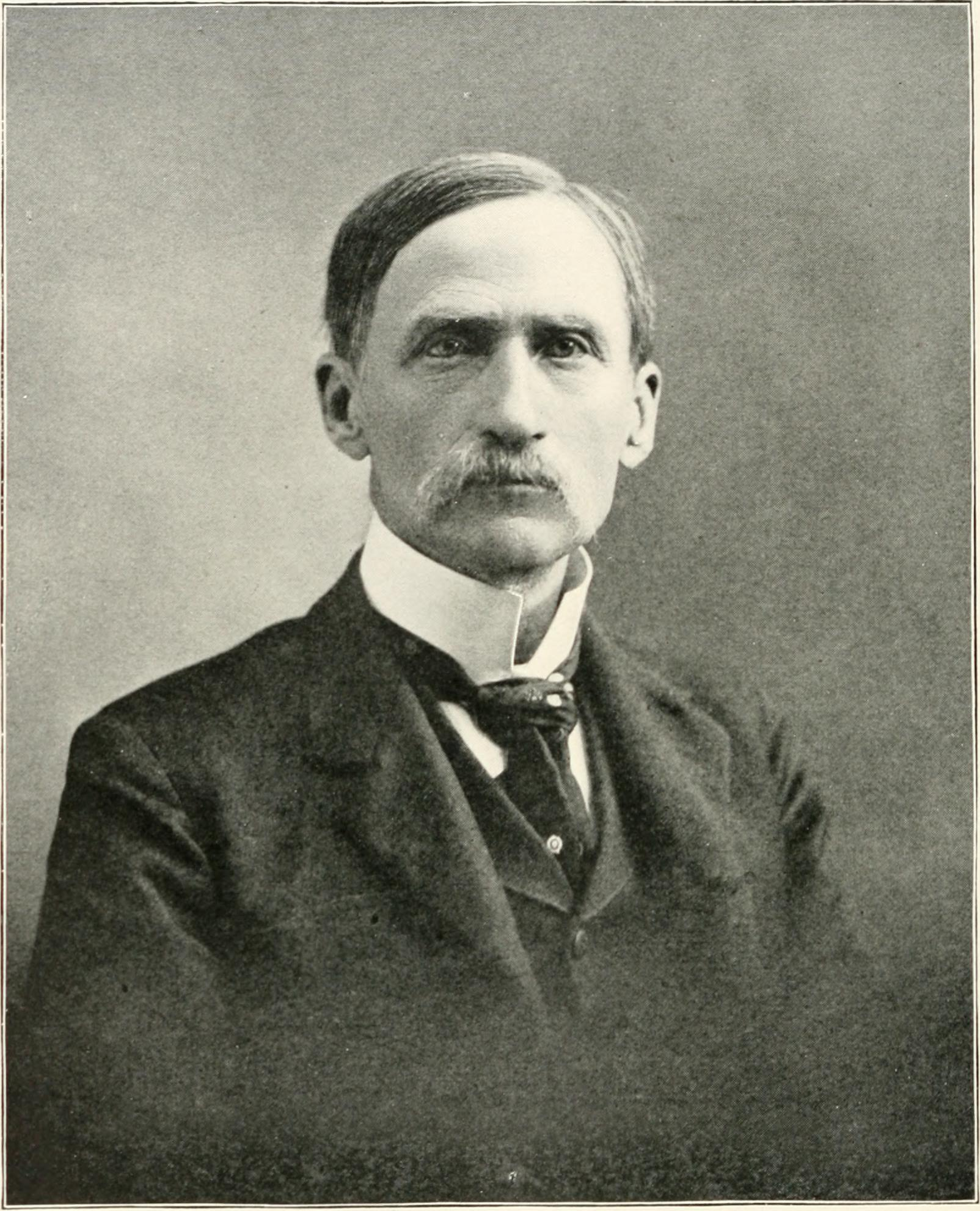
Morris Schaff

Morris Schaff (December 28, 1840 – October 19, 1929) was an American military officer and historian. A native of Etna Township, Ohio, he wrote several books relating to U.S. Civil War history and the history of Etna and Kirkersville, in Licking County.

== Early life ==
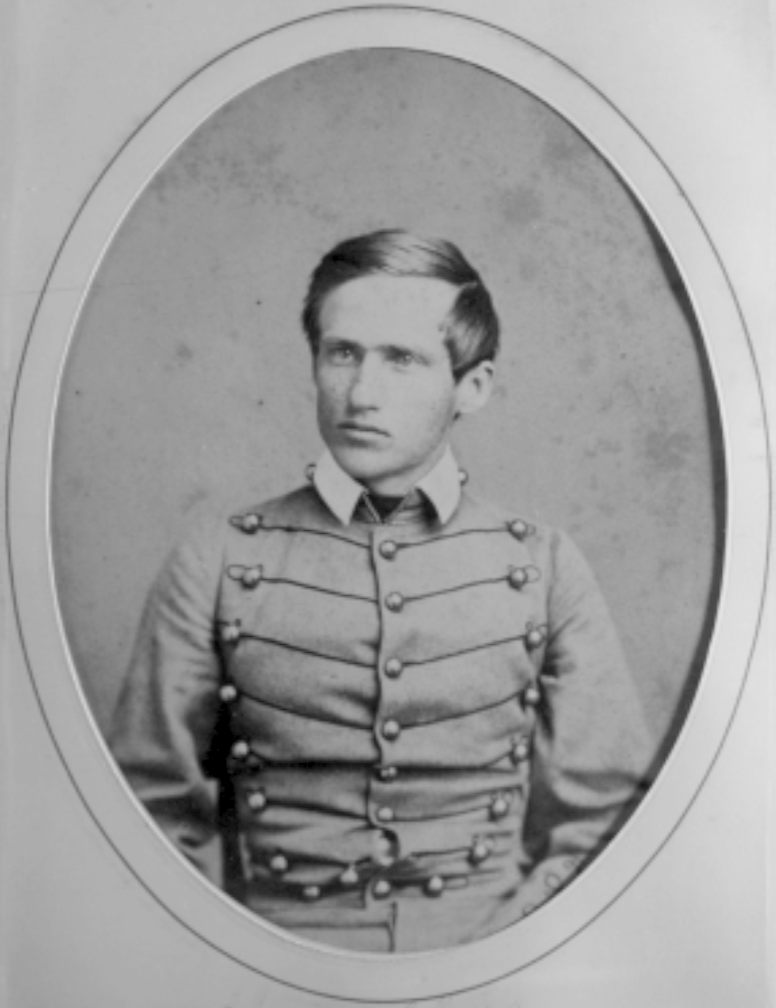
At West Point in 1862

Schaff was born on December 28, 1840, to John Schaff and Charlotte Hartzell Schaff on a farm in Etna Township, Ohio. Schaff lived in Kirkersville, Ohio, between 1849 and 1858, when he was appointed by Congressman Samuel S. Cox to attend the United States Military Academy. He graduated from West Point in June 1862 and was commissioned as a Second Lieutenant of Ordnance. Schaff excelled in academics and developed excellent military skills while at West Point.

== Military career ==
Schaff fought in multiple battles and campaigns during the U.S. Civil War, including the Rappahannock Campaign and the Richmond Campaign, serving under Union Army commanders Major General Gouverneur Warren, General Joseph Hooker, General George Meade, and General Ulysses S. Grant. His wartime experiences greatly influenced the authorship of his 20th-century books and articles. Schaff resigned from the Army on December 31, 1871. He later became known as General Schaff because he was appointed Brigadier General of the Massachusetts Militia in 1880.

== Later life ==
After marrying Alice Page Schaff in 1868 and moving to Massachusetts, he was Superintendent of the Berkshire Glass Works for 11 years, and spent 26 years in public service with the State Gas and Electric Light Commission of Massachusetts. Schaff embarked on a writing career late in life, publishing his first book in 1905. Morris Schaff died in Southboro, Massachusetts, on October 19, 1929, and was buried at Pittsfield Cemetery.

== Books and publications ==
Schaff's books include:

- Etna and Kirkersville (Boston : Houghton, Mifflin and Co.; Cambridge, MA : Riverside Press, 1905)
- The Spirit of Old West Point 1858-1862 (Boston, New York, Houghton Mifflin Company, 1907)
- Battle of the Wilderness (Boston, Houghton Mifflin Co., 1910)
- Sunset of the Confederacy (Boston, J.W. Luce and Company, 1912)
- Jefferson Davis: His Life and Personality (Boston, J.W. Luce and Company, 1922)
