= Samuel Sherer Elder =

Union Army officer in the American Civil War

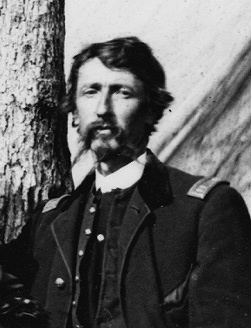
- Born: ca. 1827/28; Harrisburg, Pennsylvania, US
- Died: April 6, 1885 (aged 57–58); Fortress Monroe, Virginia, US
- Burial place: Paxton Presbyterian Churchyard; Harrisburg, Pennsylvania, US
- Spouse(s): Elizabeth M. Garland (m. 1868)
- Military career
- Allegiance: United States
- Branch: United States Army; Union Army
- Service years: 1853–1858; 1861–1885
- Rank: Major; Brevet Lieutenant Colonel
- Units: 2nd U.S. Artillery; 1st U.S. Artillery
- Commands: Battery E, 4th U.S. Artillery
- Conflicts: American Civil War

Samuel Sherer Elder (ca. 1827/28 – April 6, 1885) was a career United States Army artillery officer and a battery commander in the famed U.S. Horse Artillery Brigade during the American Civil War.

== Early years ==
Born in Harrisburg, Pennsylvania, Elder enlisted in the United States Army in June 1853 and was assigned to Battery C, 2nd U.S. Artillery. During his five-year enlistment, he was promoted from the rank of private through first sergeant. His enlistment ended in 1858, and he returned to civilian life.

As a civilian, Elder trained as a lawyer.

== Career ==
Upon the outbreak of the American Civil War, Elder received a commission as second lieutenant on March 23, 1861, assigned to the 1st U.S. Artillery. Promoted to first lieutenant in the 4th U.S. Artillery, May 14, 1861, Elder commanded Battery E, 4th U.S. Artillery and served in the Eastern Theater with the Army of the Potomac. He was cited for gallantry and awarded a promotion to brevet captain for actions at Antietam, September 17, 1862.

By 1863, Elder's battery was assigned to the U.S. Horse Artillery Brigade, where it served for most of the remainder of the war. He earned a permanent promotion to captain on August 1, 1863. Detached briefly in February 1864, Elder was cited for gallantry at the Battle of Olustee in Florida and was awarded the brevet promotion to major. Returning to the Horse Artillery, he was again cited for actions at Drewry’s Bluff, May 5, 1864, and was brevetted lieutenant colonel. He remained with the Army after the war and was promoted to major in the 2nd U.S. Artillery, June 30, 1882.

== Death ==
Elder died on April 6, 1885, while stationed at Fort Monroe, Virginia, where he had been an instructor of law at the Artillery School of Practice. His listed age at time of death was 58 years old. He was buried in his hometown of Harrisburg, Pennsylvania.
