= List of United States Regular Army units in the American Civil War =

The following is a list of the units of the United States Regular Army during the American Civil War.

== Infantry ==
- 1st Infantry Regiment
- 2nd Infantry Regiment
- 3rd Infantry Regiment
- 4th Infantry Regiment
- 5th Infantry Regiment
- 6th Infantry Regiment
- 7th Infantry Regiment
- 8th Infantry Regiment
- 9th Infantry Regiment
- 10th Infantry Regiment
- 11th Infantry Regiment
- 12th Infantry Regiment
- 13th Infantry Regiment
- 14th Infantry Regiment
- 15th Infantry Regiment
- 16th Infantry Regiment
- 17th Infantry Regiment
- 18th Infantry Regiment
- 19th Infantry Regiment

== Cavalry ==
- 1st Cavalry Regiment
- 2nd Cavalry Regiment
- 3rd Cavalry Regiment
- 4th Cavalry Regiment
- 5th Cavalry Regiment
- 6th Cavalry Regiment

== Artillery ==
- 1st Artillery Regiment
  - Battery A
  - Battery B
  - Battery C
  - Battery D
  - Battery E
  - Battery F
  - Battery G
  - Battery H
  - Battery I
  - Battery K
  - Battery M
- 2d Artillery Regiment
  - Battery A
  - Battery E
  - Battery G
- 3d Artillery Regiment
- 4th Artillery Regiment
  - Battery A
  - Battery B
  - Battery C
  - Battery E
  - Battery G
  - Battery H
  - Battery I
  - Battery K
  - Battery M
- 5th Artillery Regiment
  - Battery A
  - Battery C
  - Battery D
  - Battery H
  - Battery I
  - Battery K

== See also ==
- Lists of American Civil War Regiments by State
