= 5th U.S. Artillery, Battery I =

5th U.S. Light Artillery, Battery "I"
- Active: September 1861 to 1865
- Country: United States
- Allegiance: Union
- Branch: Field Artillery Branch (United States)
- Engagements: Siege of Yorktown; Seven Days Battles; Battle of Mechanicsville; Second Battle of Bull Run; Battle of Antietam; Battle of Fredericksburg; Battle of Chancellorsville; Battle of Gettysburg; Battle of the Wilderness; Battle of Spotsylvania Court House; Battle of Cold Harbor; Siege of Petersburg; Battle of Jerusalem Plank Road; First Battle of Deep Bottom; Battle of Boydton Plank Road; Battle of Fort Stedman; Appomattox Campaign

Battery "I" 5th Regiment of Artillery was a light artillery battery that served in the Union Army during the American Civil War.

== Service ==
The battery was attached to Artillery Reserve, Army of the Potomac, to May 1862. Artillery, 2nd Division, V Corps, Army of the Potomac, to May 1863. Artillery Brigade, V Corps, to July 1863. Camp Barry, Washington, D.C., XXII Corps, to November 1863. Consolidated with 5th U.S. Artillery, Battery C November 1863. Artillery Brigade, II Corps, Army of the Potomac, to March 1865. Artillery Reserve, Army of the Potomac, to June 1865. Department of Washington to August 1865.

== Detailed service ==
Duty in the Defenses of Washington, D. C., until March 1862. Ordered to the Virginia Peninsula. Siege of Yorktown April 5-May 4. Near New Bridge June 20. Seven days before Richmond June 25-July 1. Mechanicsville June 26. Gaines' Mill June 27. Turkey Bend June 30. Malvern Hill July 1. Movement from Harrison's Landing to Centreville August 16–28. Pope's Campaign in northern Virginia August 28-September 2. Battle of Groveton August 29. Second Battle of Bull Run August 30. Maryland Campaign September 6–22. Battle of Antietam September 16–17. Shepherdstown Ford September 19. Shepherdstown September 20. Movement to Falmouth, Va., October 30-November 19. Battle of Fredericksburg, Va., December 12–15. Chancellorsville Campaign April 27-May 6. Battle of Chancellorsville May 1–5. Gettysburg Campaign June 11-July 24. Battle of Gettysburg July 1–3. At Camp Barry, Washington, D.C., until December 1863. Consolidated with Battery C, 5th U.S. Light Artillery November 1863. Rapidan Campaign May 4-June 12. Battle of the Wilderness May 5–7. Spotsylvania Court House May 8–21. Po River May 10. Assault on the Salient May 12. North Anna River May 22–26. On line of the Pamunkey May 26–28. Totopotomoy May 28–31. Cold Harbor June 1–12. Assaults on Petersburg June 16–18. Siege of Petersburg June 16, 1864 to April 2, 1865. Jerusalem Plank Road June 22, 1864. Deep Bottom July 27–29. Weldon Railroad August 18–21. Boydton Plank Road, Hatcher's Run, October 27–28. Fort Stedman March 25, 1865. Appomattox Campaign March 28-April 9. Assaults on and fall of Petersburg April 2. Moved to Washington, D.C. May. Grand Review of the Armies May 23. Duty at Washington, D. C.

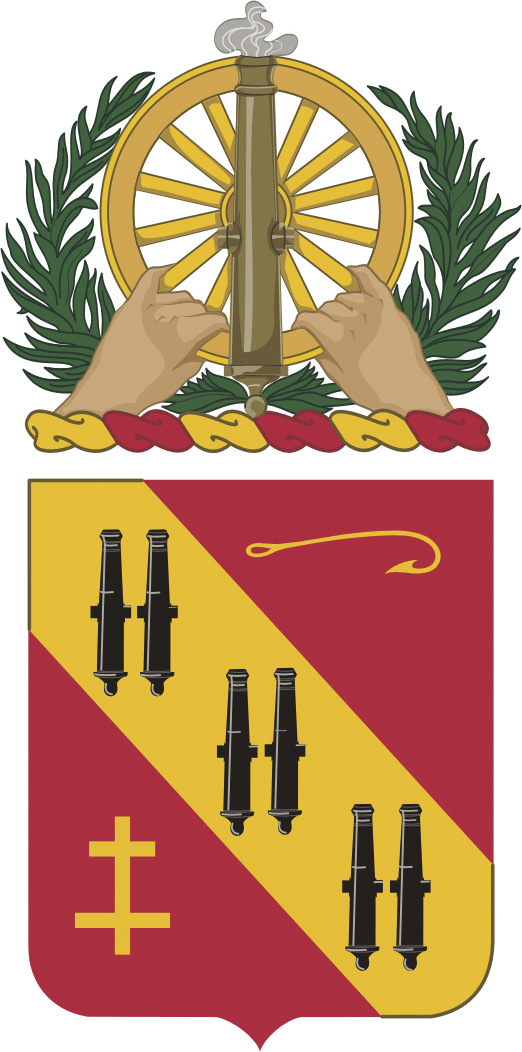
Coat of arms of the 5th Air Defense Artillery

The crest of the coat of arms of the 5th Air Defense Artillery Regiment (formerly the 5th U.S. Artillery), depicting hands grasping a wheel with a gun superimposed on it, commemorates the service of Battery C and Battery I, combined under Lt. Richard Metcalf at Spotsylvania, 4–24 May 1864. The battery "charged earthworks firing its guns and then ran them up by hand to a new position, to the Bloody Angle, and fired repeatedly. This is purported to be the only recorded instance in the Civil War of a battery charging on breastworks."

== Commanders ==
- Captain Stephen Hinsdale Weed
- Lieutenant Malbone F. Watson

== See also ==
- List of United States Regular Army Civil War units
- 5th Air Defense Artillery Regiment
