= 5th U.S. Artillery, Battery C =

5th U.S. Light Artillery, Battery "C"
- Active: September 1861 to 1865
- Country: United States
- Allegiance: Union
- Branch: Field Artillery Branch (United States)
- Engagements: Seven Days Battles; Battle of Mechanicsville; Second Battle of Bull Run; Battle of Antietam; Battle of Fredericksburg; Battle of Chancellorsville; Battle of Gettysburg; New York City Draft Riots; Mine Run Campaign; Battle of the Wilderness; Battle of Spotsylvania Court House; Battle of Cold Harbor; Siege of Petersburg; Battle of Jerusalem Plank Road; First Battle of Deep Bottom; Battle of Boydton Plank Road; Battle of Fort Stedman; Appomattox Campaign

Battery "C" 5th Regiment of Artillery was a light artillery battery that served in the Union Army during the American Civil War.

== Service ==
The battery was attached to Artillery, McCall's Division, Army of the Potomac, to March 1862. Artillery, 2nd Division, I Corps, Army of the Potomac, to April 1862, and Department of the Rappahannock, to June 1862. Artillery, 3rd Division, V Corps, Army of the Potomac, to August 1862. Artillery, 3rd Division, III Corps, Army of Virginia, to September 1862. Artillery, 3rd Division, I Corps, Army of the Potomac, to February 1863. Artillery, 2nd Division, I Corps, to May 1863. 1st Regular Brigade, Artillery Reserve, Army of the Potomac, to July 1863. Camp Barry, Washington, D.C., XXII Corps, to November 1863. Consolidated with Battery I in November 1863. Artillery Brigade, II Corps, Army of the Potomac, to March 1865. Artillery Reserve, Army of the Potomac, to June 1865. Dept. of Washington, D.C. to August 1865.

== Detailed service ==
Duty in the defenses of Washington, D.C. until April 1862. Advance on Falmouth, Va., April 9–19. McDowell's advance on Richmond May 25–28. Ordered to the Virginia Peninsula June. Seven days before Richmond June 25-July 1. Mechanicsville June 26. Gaines' Mill June 27. Glendale June 30. Malvern Hill July 1. At Harrison's Landing until August 16. Movement to Fort Monroe, then to Centreville, Va., August 16–28. Pope's Campaign in northern Virginia August 28-September 2. Battle of Groveton August 29; Second Battle of Bull Run August 30. Maryland Campaign September 6–22. South Mountain, Md., September 14. Antietam, Md., September 16–17. Movement to Falmouth, Va., October 30-November 19. Battle of Fredericksburg December 12–15. "Mud March" January 20–24, 1863. At Falmouth until April. Chancellorsville Campaign April 27-May 6. Operations at Pollock's Mill Creek April 29-May 2. Fitzhugh's Crossing April 29–30. Battle of Chancellorsville May 1–5. Battle of Gettysburg, July 1–3. Draft riots in New York July 3–15. At Camp Barry, Washington, D.C., until November. Mine Run Campaign November 26-December 2. Rapidan Campaign May 4-June 12. 1864. Battle of the Wilderness May 5–7. Spotsylvania Court House May 8–21. Po River May 10. Assault on the Salient May 12. North Anna River May 22–26. On line of the Pamunkey May 26–29. Totopotomoy May 28–31. Cold Harbor June 1–12. Assaults on Petersburg June 16–18. Siege of Petersburg June 16, 1864 to April 2, 1865. Jerusalem Plank Road June 22, 1864. Deep Bottom July 27–29. Weldon Railroad August 18–21. Boydton Plank Road, Hatcher's Run, October 27–28. Fort Stedman March 25, 1865. Appomattox Campaign March 28-April 9. Assault on and fall of Petersburg April 2. Moved to Washington, D.C., May. Grand Review of the Armies May 23. Duty at Washington, D.C.

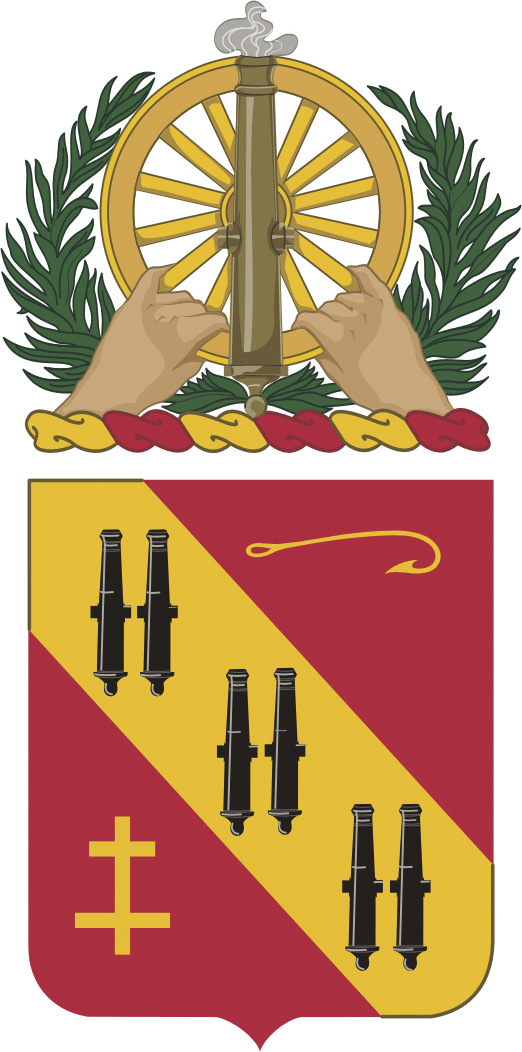
Coat of arms of the 5th Air Defense Artillery

The crest of the coat of arms of the 5th Air Defense Artillery Regiment (formerly the 5th U.S. Artillery), depicting hands grasping a wheel with a gun superimposed on it, commemorates the service of Battery C and Battery I, combined under Lt. Richard Metcalf at Spotsylvania, 4–24 May 1864. The battery "charged earthworks firing its guns and then ran them up by hand to a new position, to the Bloody Angle, and fired repeatedly. This is purported to be the only recorded instance in the Civil War of a battery charging on breastworks."

== Commanders ==
- Captain Henry V. De Hart - mortally wounded in action during the Seven Days Battles
- Captain Dunbar R. Ransom
- Lieutenant Eben G. Scott
- Lieutenant Richard Metcalf
- Lieutenant Gulian V. Weir

== See also ==
- List of United States Regular Army Civil War units
- 5th Air Defense Artillery Regiment
