= Battle of Egan Station =

Coordinates: 39.8600°N 114.9365°W

- Part of the Indian Wars
Date	August 11, 1860
Location	Schellbourne, Nevada
Result	U.S. victory

Commanders and leaders
- Stephen H. Weed

Units involved
23 members of Company B, 4th U.S. Artillery; 3 civilians	80 Paiutes

Strength
30	80

Casualties and losses
1 Died of wound 2 wounded	3 killed 12 wounded

The Battle of Egan Station (also known as Egan Canyon Station or Egan Canyon) was a minor skirmish which occurred near Schellbourne, Nevada in August 1860. A group of about 80 Paiute warriors attacked a Pony Express station in Egan Canyon looking for food. When the two civilians had gathered up all the food on hand the warrior's chief demanded they bake more bread. Meanwhile, an approaching Pony Express rider turned around and rode back to a military column he passed along the trail. The soldiers were members of the 4th U.S. Artillery under Lt. Stephen H. Weed. As Weed rushed to Egan Station just as the warriors were preparing to burn the two station workers alive. In the ensuing fight, Weed's men freed the captives and ran off the Native warriors inflicting 3 killed and roughly 12 wounded. Weed's losses were 2 wounded and 1 died of wounds.

The San Francisco Daily Evening Bulletin, on August 21, 1860, report on the incident:

...[they demanded] some powder and lead of the men in charge of the station, which they refused to let them have as a matter of course. They then wanted some provisions, and the men gave them two sacks of flour, and some sugar and coffee. One of the men then started out after the animals kept at that place, when the Indians told him that he could not go, and that they would take care of the animals themselves, and commenced singing and hallooing at a great rate. At that instant Lieutenant Weed, with twenty-five soldiers, came up and attacked the Indians, who returned the fire, wounding three men ... The Indians fled without driving off any of the stock. About the same time, six or eight Indians went to where some men were mowing, near Deep Creek, and ordered them away, but went off without molesting them further. They came back next morning, when four soldiers, who had secreted themselves in a wagon, fired on them, wounding two mortally. The others fled.
