= 5th U.S. Artillery, Battery K =

5th U.S. Light Artillery, Battery "K"
- Active: 1861 - 1865
- Country: United States
- Allegiance: Union
- Branch: Field Artillery Branch (United States)
- Engagements: Siege of Yorktown; Seven Days Battles; Battle of Beaver Dam Creek; Battle of Gaines's Mill; Battle of Malvern Hill; Second Battle of Bull Run; Battle of Antietam; Battle of Shepherdstown; Battle of Fredericksburg; Battle of Chancellorsville; Battle of Gettysburg; Chattanooga campaign Atlanta campaign Siege of Atlanta

Battery "K" 5th Regiment of Artillery was a light artillery battery that served in the Union Army during the American Civil War.

== Service ==
The battery was attached to Provost Guard, Army of the Potomac, October 1861 to March 1862. Artillery Reserve, Army of the Potomac, to May 1862. 2nd Brigade, Artillery Reserve, V Corps, Army of the Potomac, to September 1862. Artillery, 2nd Division, V Corps, to October 1862. Artillery Reserve, Army of the Potomac, to May 1863. Artillery Brigade, XII Corps, Army of the Potomac, to October 1863, and Army of the Cumberland, October 1863. Artillery, 2nd Division, XII Corps, Army of the Cumberland, to March 1864. 1st Division. Artillery Reserve, Department of the Cumberland, to August 1864. Artillery Brigade, XX Corps, Army of the Cumberland, to October 1864. Garrison Artillery, Chattanooga, Tennessee, Department of the Cumberland, to August 1865.

Battery armament consisted of four 12-pounder Napoleon smoothbore cannons.

== Detailed service ==
- Duty in the defenses of Washington, D.C., until March 1862.
- Ordered to the Virginia Peninsula.
- Siege of Yorktown, Va., April 5-May 4.
- Seven Days Battles before Richmond June 25-July 1.
- Mechanicsville June 26.
- Gaines's Mill June 27.
- Turkey Bridge June 30.
- Malvern Hill July 1. At Harrison's Landing until August 16.
- Movement to Centreville, Va., August 16–28.
- Pope's campaign in northern Virginia August 28-September 2.
- Battle of Groveton August 29.
- Second Battle of Bull Run August 30.
- Maryland Campaign September 6–22.
- Battle of Antietam September 16–17.
- Shepherdstown Ford September 19.
- Shepherdstown September 20.
- Moved to Falmouth, Va., October 30-November 19.
- Battle of Fredericksburg, Va., December 12–15.
- Chancellorsville Campaign April 27-May 6.
- Battle of Chancellorsville May 1–5.
- Battle of Gettysburg July 1–3.
- Moved to Bridgeport, Ala., September 24-October 3.
- Operations on line of Memphis & Charleston Railroad October–November.
- Chattanooga-Ringgold Campaign November 23–27. At Chattanooga, Tenn., until August 1864.
- Atlanta Campaign. Siege of Atlanta August 25-September 2.
- Operations at Chattahoochie River Bridge August 26-September 2.
- Occupation of Atlanta to October.
- Garrison duty at Chattanooga, Tenn., until August 1865.

== Commanders ==
- Captain John R. Smead - killed in action at the Second Battle of Bull Run
- 1st Lieutenant William E. Van Reed - succeeded Cpt Smead
- 1st Lieutenant David H. Kinzie - succeeded 1Lt Van Reed
- Captain Edmund C. Bainbridge - succeeded 1Lt Kinzie

== See also ==
- List of United States Regular Army Civil War units
- 5th Air Defense Artillery Regiment
