= 4th U.S. Artillery, Battery C =

4th U.S. Light Artillery, Battery "C"
- Active: 1861 - 1865
- Country: United States
- Allegiance: Union
- Branch: Field Artillery Branch (United States)
- Engagements: Siege of Yorktown; Battle of Seven Pines; Seven Days Battles; Battle of Savage's Station; Battle of White Oak Swamp; Battle of Malvern Hill; Battle of Antietam; Battle of Fredericksburg; Battle of Chancellorsville; Battle of Gettysburg; Bristoe Campaign; Mine Run Campaign; Battle of the Wilderness; Battle of North Anna; Battle of Totopotomoy Creek; Battle of Cold Harbor; Siege of Petersburg; Wilson–Kautz Raid; Battle of Sappony Church; Appomattox Campaign; Battle of Sailor's Creek; Battle of Appomattox Court House

Battery "C" 4th Regiment of Artillery was a light artillery battery that served in the Union Army during the American Civil War.

== Service ==
The battery was attached to Battery A, 4th U.S. Light Artillery until October 1862. Subsequently it was attached to Sumner's Division, Army of the Potomac, to March 1862. Artillery, 1st Division, II Corps, to May 1863. 1st Regular Brigade, Artillery Reserve, Army of the Potomac, to November 1863. Artillery Brigade, VI Corps, to March 1864. Artillery Reserve, Army of the Potomac, to April 1864. Consolidated with Battery E, 4th U.S. Light Artillery as a horse battery April 11, 1864. 1st Brigade, Horse Artillery, Army of the Potomac, to August 1864. Horse Artillery, Army of the Shenandoah, Middle Military Division, to December 1864. Horse Artillery Reserve, Army of the Shenandoah, to May 1865. 3rd Division, Cavalry Corps, Horse Artillery Brigade, XXII Corps, to August 1865.

== Detailed service ==
Duty in the defenses of Washington, D.C., until March 1862. Operations on Orange & Alexandria Railroad March 28–31. Moved to the Virginia Peninsula. Siege of Yorktown April 5-May 4. Battle of Fair Oaks, Seven Pines, May 31-June 1. Seven Days Battles before Richmond June 25-July 1. Peach Orchard and Savage Station June 29. White Oak Swamp and Glendale June 30. Malvern Hill July 1. At Harrison's Landing until August 16. Movement to Alexandria and Centreville August 16–28. Covered Pope's retreat August 28-September 2. Maryland Campaign September 6–22. Battle of Antietam September 16–17. At Harpers Ferry September 22-October 30. Movement to Falmouth, Va., October 30-November 19. Battle of Fredericksburg December 12–15. At Falmouth until April 1863. Chancellorsville Campaign April 27-May 6. Battle of Chancellorsville May 1–5. Gettysburg Campaign June 11-July 24. Battle of Gettysburg July 1–3. Bristoe Campaign October 9–22. Advanced to line of the Rappahannock November 7–8. Rappahannock Station November 7. Mine Run Campaign November 26-December 2. Rapidan Campaign May 4-June 12, 1864. Craig's Meeting House May 5. Todd's Tavern May 5–6. Battle of the Wilderness May 6–7. Sheridan's Raid to the James River May 9–24. North Anna River May 9. Ground Squirrel Church and Yellow Tavern May 11. Brook Church, Richmond fortifications, May 12. Strawberry Hill May 12. On line of the Pamunkey May 26–28. Totopotomoy May 28–31. Cold Harbor June 1–12. Totopotomoy June 3. Long Bridge June 12. Riddell's Shop June 13. White Oak Swamp June 13. Siege of Petersburg June 16-August 5. Ream's Station June 22. Wilson's Raid on Southside & Danville Railroad June 22-July 1. Nottaway Court House June 23. Staunton River Bridge June 25. Sappony Church, Stony Creek, June 28–29. Ream's Station June 29. Sheridan's Shenandoah Valley Campaign August 7-November 28. Expedition from Winchester into Faquier and Loudoun Counties November 28-December 3. Expedition to Gordonsville December 19–28. Liberty Mills December 22. Sheridan's Raid from Winchester February 27-March 25, 1865. Occupation of Staunton and action at Waynesboro March 2. Duguidsville March 8. Appomattox Campaign March 28-April 9. Dinwiddie Court House March 30–31. Five Forks April 1. Scott's Cross Roads April 2. Tabernacle Church or Beaver Pond Creek April 4. Sailor's Creek April 6. Appomattox Station April 8. Appomattox Court House April 9. Surrender of Lee and his army. Expedition to Danville April 23–29. March to Washington, D.C., May. Grand Review of the Armies May 23. Duty at Washington until August.

== Commanders ==
- Captain George Washington Hazzard - mortally wounded in action at the Battle of White Oak Swamp
- Brevet Captain Rufus King, Jr. - commanded at the Battle of White Oak Swamp while still at the rank of 1st lieutenant after Cpt Hazzard was mortally wounded
- Captain Evan Thomas

== Notable members ==
- Captain Rufus King - Medal of Honor recipient for action at the Battle of White Oak Swamp

== See also ==
- List of United States Regular Army Civil War units
- 4th Air Defense Artillery Regiment
