= Dunbar R. Ransom =

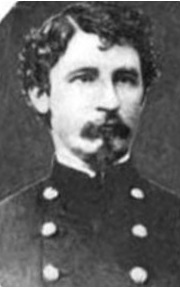
- Born: January 10, 1831; Fayetteville, North Carolina, U.S.
- Died: July 11, 1897 (aged 66) Fort Worth, Texas, U.S.
- Buried: Oakwood Cemetery, Fort Worth, Texas, U.S.
- Allegiance: United States; Union
- Branch: United States Army; Union Army
- Service years: 1855–1872
- Rank: Captain; Colonel (Brevet)
- Conflicts: Yakima War; American Civil War
- Education: United States Military Academy; Norwich University

Dunbar R. Ransom (January 10, 1831 – July 11, 1897) was a United States Army officer and veteran of the American Civil War. He is notable for having commanded Union Army artillery units throughout the conflict.

== Early life ==
Dunbar Ransom was born at Fayetteville, North Carolina on January 10, 1831 and raised in Vermont. He was the son of Colonel Truman B. Ransom and brother of General Thomas E. G. Ransom. Ransom attended the United States Military Academy, and graduated from Norwich University in 1851. On June 7, 1855 Ransom was appointed as a second lieutenant in the 3rd U.S. Artillery. He served on the West Coast of the United States, and was promoted to first lieutenant on December 31, 1856. Ransom participated in the later stages of the Yakima War in an expedition during 1858 that culminated in the Battle of Four Lakes near Spokane, Washington.

== War Service ==
Following the outbreak of war, Ransom was promoted to the rank of captain on November 1, 1861. He was assigned command of Battery L of the 3rd Artillery. However, Ransom soon took command of Battery C, 5th U.S., accompanying the Pennsylvania Reserves at the Second Battle of Bull Run. Ransom's battery remained with the Reserves when they joined I Corps of the Army of the Potomac in time for the Battle of Antietam. Maj. Gen. George G. Meade, who led the division at Antietam, praised Ransom's battery for its support of the Reserves as they advanced into and beyond the Cornfield.

Battery C supported the Reserves at the Battle of Fredericksburg, where their attack penetrated the Confederate right flank for a time. During the following year, the battery served with the second division of I Corps at the Battle of Chancellorsville.

After Chancellorsville, the Union artillery was reorganized. The Reserve Artillery was grouped into brigades. Ransom's battery joined the First Regular Brigade, and Ransom took command of the larger formation. Gulian V. Weir took command of his battery.

At the Battle of Gettysburg, Ransom's brigade was engaged beginning on July 2, 1863. Eakin's battery served on Cemetery Hill, while the others served on or in advance of Cemetery Ridge. On July 2 the batteries of Turnbull and Thomas advanced toward Emmitsburg Road to support the advanced position of Second Division, III Corps. Turnbull was posted near the Rogers House and Weir near the Codori Farm. The batteries were forced back by the Confederate attack of Richard H. Anderson’s division. Ransom was shot through the thigh by a sharpshooter while leading Turnbull's battery into position and slid from his horse. Weir's battery lost three guns in the same action, and in 1886 he committed suicide after years of brooding over the loss. The batteries of Thomas, Weir, and Trumbull all served on Cemetery Ridge during the Confederate bombardment and unsuccessful assault on July 3. The brigade sustained 68 casualties in two days of fighting.

After Gettysburg, Ransom returned to duty, and he and Battery C were sent to New York City following the New York Draft Riots of July 13 to 16. After returning to the Army of the Potomac with Battery C, Ransom was assigned to the 2nd brigade of Horse Artillery under William M. Graham. The battery served in the Bristoe Campaign and the Mine Run Campaign during the fall of 1863.

When campaigning resumed in the spring of 1864, Ransom had succeeded Graham in command of the 2nd Horse Artillery Brigade. He led this formation in the Overland Campaign, including the Battle of the Wilderness and the Battle of Spotsylvania Court House. Later in the campaign, all the Horse Artillery apparently was consolidated under the command of Capt. James M. Robertson. This was the situation until just before the beginning of the siege of Petersburg, when Ransom resumed command of his brigade.

In late 1864, Ransom was transferred to the Union Army of the Shenandoah, where he commanded the consolidated Batteries C, F and K of the 3rd U.S. Artillery. His battery was involved in the Battle of Berryville, but it was on detached duty at the time of the Battle of Opequon. In his Memoirs, Philip Sheridan indicated Ransom was present at the Battle of Cedar Creek. Ransom remained in the Middle Military Division until the end of the war.

During the war Ransom received brevet promotions to major (December 13, 1862), lieutenant colonel (July 3, 1863), and colonel (August 25, 1864).

== Post war ==
Ransom remained on active duty after the war, reverting to his permanent rank of captain. In 1872 Ransom was charged with conduct unbecoming an officer for having borrowed money to facilitate travel from one military assignment to another, and resorting to deceit to avoid repaying it, and he was dismissed from the service. He then undertook railroad work with the Fort Worth and Denver Railway. Later he was aided by Grenville M. Dodge, the president of the railroad, who brought the matter of Ransom's dismissal to the attention of Congress.

In 1892 a Congressional investigation determined that Ransom had not been deceitful, that his Army pay had been delayed for more than a year because of his travel between posts at the time of the loan, and that he had not intentionally avoided repaying the debt. Further, Congress determined that even if Ransom had intentionally tried to avoid repaying the debt, that would have been a private matter and not professional conduct unbecoming an officer. In 1894 Congress restored Ransom to the Army's rolls and transferred him to the retired list, enabling him to qualify for a pension.

Ransom died at St. Joseph's Infirmary in Fort Worth, Texas on July 11, 1897. His body was embalmed to await burial by his brother-in-law Captain James O’Hara of the 3rd U.S. Artillery. Ransom was buried at Fort Worth's City Cemetery, now part of Oakwood Cemetery, block 54, space 30.
