= 4th U.S. Artillery, Battery M =

4th U.S. Light Artillery, Battery "M"
- Active: 1861 to 1865
- Country: United States
- Allegiance: Union
- Branch: Field Artillery Branch (United States)
- Engagements: Battle of Shiloh; Siege of Corinth; Battle of Perryville (2 sections); Battle of Stones River; Tullahoma Campaign; Battle of Chickamauga; Siege of Chattanooga; Battle of Lookout Mountain; Battle of Missionary Ridge; Battle of Spring Hill; Second Battle of Franklin; Battle of Nashville

Battery "M" 4th Regiment of Artillery was a light artillery battery that served in the Union Army during the American Civil War.

== Service ==
The battery 4th division merged with the Artillery, 5th Division, Army of the Ohio, in May 1862. (United with 4th U.S. Light Artillery, Battery H February 1862 to January 1863.) Artillery, 4th Division, Army of the Ohio, to September 1862. 10th Brigade, 4th Division, II Corps, Army of the Ohio, to November 1862. Artillery, 2nd Division, Left Wing, XIV Corps, Army of the Cumberland, to January 1863. Artillery, 2nd Division, XXI Corps, Army of the Cumberland, to October 1863. Artillery, 1st Division, IV Corps, to March 1864. 1st Division, Artillery Reserve, Department of the Cumberland, to October 1864. Croxton's Cavalry Brigade to November 1864. Artillery Brigade, IV Corps, to February 1865. Garrison Artillery, Bridgeport, Alabama, to August 1865.

== Detailed service ==
Louisville, Ky., February 1862. Moved to Nashville, Tenn., February 14–25, 1862, thence march to Savannah, Tenn., to reinforce the Army of the Tennessee March 20-April 6. Battle of Shiloh, April 6–7. Advance on and siege of Corinth, Miss., April 29-May 30. Bridge Creek near Corinth May 28. Tuscumbia Creek May 31. Buell's Campaign in northern Alabama and middle Tennessee June to August. March to Louisville, Ky., in pursuit of Bragg August 21-September 26. Pursuit of Bragg to London, Ky., October 1–22. Battle of Perryville, Ky., October 8. Danville October 11. March to Nashville, Tenn., October 22-November 9, and duty there until December 26. Advance on Murfreesboro December 26–30. Battle of Stones River December 30–31, 1862 and January 1–3, 1863. Duty at Murfreesboro until June. Tullahoma Campaign June 23-July 7. Occupation of middle Tennessee until August 16. Passage of the Cumberland Mountains and Tennessee River and Chickamauga Campaign August 16-September 22. Battle of Chickamauga, September 19–20. Siege of Chattanooga, Tenn., September 24-November 23. Reopening Tennessee River October 26–29. Battles of Chattanooga November 23–27. At Bridgeport, Ala., to March 1864, and at Nashville, Tenn., until October 1864. Attached to Croxton's Cavalry Brigade until November. Nashville Campaign November–December. Shoal Creek November 4. In front of Columbia November 24–27. Spring Hill November 29. Battle of Franklin November 30. Battle of Nashville December 15–16. Pursuit of Hood to the Tennessee River December 17–28. Moved to Huntsville, Ala., and duty there until February 1865. Garrison Artillery at Bridgeport, Ala., until July.

== Commanders ==
- Captain John Mendenhall - commanded at the Battle of Perryville
- Lieutenant Charles C. Parsons - commanded the consolidated battery at the Battle of Stones River
- Lieutenant Francis L. D. Russell - commanded at the Battle of Chickamauga
- Lieutenant Samuel Canby - commanded at the battle of Nashville

== See also ==
- List of United States Regular Army Civil War units
