= 4th U.S. Artillery, Battery B =

4th U.S. Light Artillery, Battery B
- Active: 1861–1865
- Country: United States of America
- Allegiance: United States Army; Union
- Branch: Field Artillery Branch (United States)
- Engagements: American Civil War: Battle of Cedar Mountain; Second Battle of Bull Run; Battle of Antietam; Battle of Fredericksburg; Battle of Chancellorsville; Battle of Gettysburg; Bristoe Campaign; Mine Run Campaign; Battle of the Wilderness; Battle of North Anna; Battle of Totopotomoy Creek; Battle of Cold Harbor; Siege of Petersburg; Battle of Globe Tavern; Battle of Boydton Plank Road; Appomattox Campaign; Battle of Five Forks; Battle of Appomattox Court House

Battery "B", 4th Regiment of Artillery was a light artillery battery that served in the Union Army during the American Civil War.

== Service ==
The battery was attached to McDowell's Division, Army of the Potomac, to March 1862. Artillery, 1st Division, I Corps, Army of the Potomac, to April 1862. Artillery, 3rd Division, Department of the Rappahannock, to June 1862. Artillery, 1st Division, III Corps, Army of Virginia, to September 1862. Artillery, 1st Division, I Corps, Army of the Potomac, to May 1863. Artillery Brigade, I Corps, to March 1864. Artillery Brigade, V Corps, to May 1865. Department of Washington, to August 1865.

== Detailed service ==
Reached Washington, D.C., October 1861. Duty in the defenses of Washington, D.C., until March 1862. Advanced on Manassas, Va., March 10–15. Advanced on Falmouth, Va., April 9–19. Duty at Falmouth and Fredericksburg until August. Reconnaissance from Fredericksburg to Orange Court House July 24–27. Battle of Cedar Mountain August 9. Pope's Campaign in northern Virginia August 16-September 2. Battle of Groveton August 29. Second Battle of Bull Run August 30. Maryland Campaign September 6–22. Battle of Antietam, Md., September 16–17. Movement to Falmouth, Va., October 30-November 19. Battle of Fredericksburg December 12–15. At Falmouth until April 1863. Chancellorsville Campaign April 27-May 6. Operations at Pollock's Mill Crossing April 29-May 2. Battle of Chancellorsville May 2–5. Gettysburg Campaign June 11-July 24. Battle of Gettysburg July 1–3. Bristoe Campaign October 9–22. Advance to line of the Rappahannock November 7–8. Mine Run Campaign November 26-December 2. Demonstration on the Rapidan February 6–7, 1864. Rapidan Campaign May 4-June 12. Battle of the Wilderness May 5–7. Spotsylvania May 8–21. North Anna River May 22–26. Jericho Ford May 25. On line of the Pamunkey May 26–28. Totopotomoy May 28–31. Cold Harbor June 1–12. Bethesda Church June 1–3. Before Petersburg June 16–18. Siege of Petersburg June 16, 1864 to April 2, 1865. Boydton Plank Road, Hatcher's Run, October 27–28, 1864. Warren's Raid on Weldon Railroad December 7–12. Appomattox Campaign March 28-April 9, 1865. Junction, Quaker and Boydton Roads March 29. Lewis Farm, near Gravelly Run, March 29. White Oak Road March 31. Battle of Five Forks April 1. Appomattox Court House April 9. Surrender of Lee and his army. Moved to Washington, D.C., May. Grand Review of the Armies May 23. Duty in the defenses of Washington, D.C., until August 1865.

== Commanders ==
- Captain John Gibbon
- Captain Joseph B. Campbell
- 1st Lieutenant James Stewart - commanded at the Battle of Antietam after Cpt Campbell was wounded in action; commanded at the battles of Fredericksburg, Chancellorsville, and Gettysburg
- 1st Lieutenant John Mitchell
- 2nd Lieutenant William P. Vose

== See also ==
- List of United States Regular Army Civil War units
