= Stephen H. Weed =

United States Army general (1831–1863)

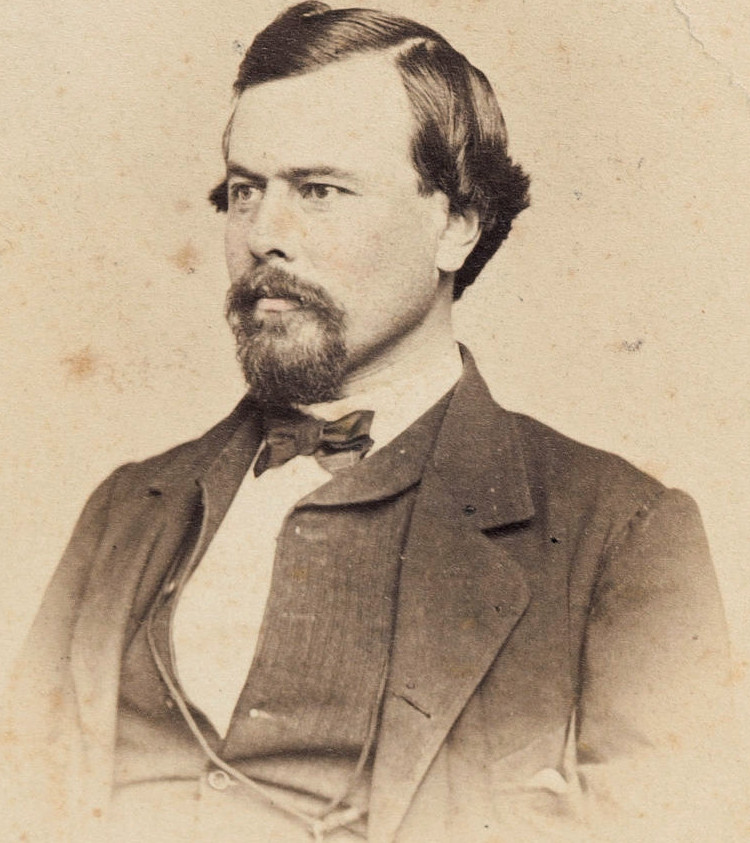
- Born: November 17, 1831; Potsdam, New York, U.S.
- Died: July 2, 1863 (aged 31); Gettysburg, Pennsylvania, U.S.
- Burial place: Moravian Cemetery, New Dorp, Staten Island, New York
- Military career
- Allegiance: United States of America; Union
- Branch: United States Army; Union Army
- Service years: 1854–1863
- Rank: Brigadier General
- Commands: 5th U.S. Light Artillery, Battery I
- Conflicts: Third Seminole War; Bleeding Kansas; Utah War; Paiute War; Battle of Egan Station; Battle of Deep Creek; American Civil War; Peninsula campaign; Second Battle of Bull Run; Battle of Fredericksburg; Battle of Chancellorsville; Battle of Gettysburg †

Stephen Hinsdale Weed (November 17, 1831 – July 2, 1863) was a career military officer in the United States Army. He fought in the Seminole Wars and the Utah War. He was killed defending Little Round Top during the Battle of Gettysburg in the American Civil War.

== Early life and career ==
Weed was born in Potsdam, New York, the second of four children born to John Kilbourne and Charity Winslow Weed. He was appointed to the United States Military Academy, graduating 27th of 46 students in the Class of 1854. Among his classmates were ten other future Civil War generals, including Oliver O. Howard and J.E.B. Stuart. He received a brevet rank of second lieutenant and was assigned to the 2nd U.S. Artillery on July 1, 1854. He served on frontier duty in Texas. In December, he received his regular rank of second lieutenant in the 4th U.S. Artillery.

Two years later, he was promoted to first lieutenant and fought in Florida in the Seminole Wars in 1856–57. He was engaged in quelling the Kansas disturbances in 1858. By now a combat veteran commanding Battery B, 4th U.S. Artillery, he participated in the Utah War, helping restore order to the territory. He saw action again fighting Indians at the Battle of Egan Station in the Utah Territory on August 11, 1860, and at the Battle of Deep Creek on September 6, 1860.

== Civil War ==
With the outbreak of the Civil War, Weed was promoted to captain of the newly formed Battery I, 5th U.S. Artillery in May 1861. He remained at Camp Curtin in Harrisburg, Pennsylvania, training his crews until the spring of 1862, when they served in the Peninsula campaign and at Second Bull Run. He commanded his battery during the fierce artillery duel at Antietam. Promoted to command of all the artillery of the V Corps, his guns were in action at the Battle of Fredericksburg. From December 1862 through January 1863, he was stationed at Falmouth, Virginia. After a short leave of absence, he took part in the Battle of Chancellorsville, commanding the artillery of the 2nd Division, V Corps. On June 6, 1863, Weed left the regular army artillery to accept a commission as a brigadier general in the volunteer army. He was assigned command of 3rd Brigade in the 2nd Division, V Corps.

At Gettysburg, his brigade went to the relief of Col. Strong Vincent's brigade on Little Round Top. His vanguard repelled a Confederate attack that had outflanked Vincent's right. Col. Patrick O'Rorke of the 140th New York Infantry was killed leading that counterattack. Elements of Weed's brigade helped move the guns of Lt. Charles E. Hazlett's Battery D, 5th United States Artillery to the top of the hill. Weed was mortally wounded in the chest (possibly by a sharpshooter hidden in Devil's Den) while standing near these guns. His last words were reported as "I would rather die here than that the rebels should gain an inch of this ground." Lt. Hazlett was killed trying to hear what Weed was saying. Command of the brigade fell to Col. Kenner Garrard of the 146th New York Infantry.

According to Tillie Pierce, a young girl from Gettysburg who witnessed the horrors of the battle from the Weikert farm on Taneytown Road just to the east of Little Round Top, Weed died in the Weikert's "basement", which served as the "cellar-kitchen." Not knowing who the man was, Tillie watched over him briefly while an attending soldier stepped away, whereupon she asked "the wounded soldier" if there was anything she could do for him: "Will you promise to come back in the morning to see me," he asked. She promised to do so, and, as she got up to leave for the night, Weed reminded, "Now don't you forget your promise." The next morning, she "hastened down to the little basement room," but "the soldier lay there -- dead. His faithful attendant was still at his side." As she "stood there gazing in sadness at the prostrate form, the attendant looked up . . . and asked: 'Do you know who this is?" When she said no, he replied, "This is the body of General Weed; a New York man."

Weed's body was returned home and buried in the Moravian Cemetery in New Dorp, a village on Staten Island in Richmond County, New York.

== In memoriam ==
Redoubt A of the military defenses around Washington, D.C., was renamed "Fort Weed" in September 1863 in his memory. Following the war, Post #91 of the Grand Army of the Republic in New York City was named the Stephen H. Weed Post. In 1902, Army General Orders No. 16 renamed a portion of Fort Wadsworth along The Narrows in New York Harbor as Battery Weed. In 1930, a street in New Dorp Beach, Staten Island was named Weed Avenue, dedicated to Stephen H. Weed.

== See also ==
- List of American Civil War generals (Union)
