= 4th U.S. Artillery, Battery I =

4th U.S. Light Artillery, Battery "I"
- Active: 1861 to 1865
- Country: United States
- Allegiance: Union
- Branch: Field Artillery Branch (United States)
- Engagements: Battle of Rich Mountain; Siege of Corinth; Battle of Perryville; Tullahoma Campaign; Battle of Chickamauga; Siege of Chattanooga; Battle of Nashville

Battery "I" 4th Regiment of Artillery was a light artillery battery that served in the Union Army during the American Civil War.

== Service ==
The battery joined McClellan in western Virginia in July 1861, and served unattached, Army of Occupation, western Virginia, to September 1861. 3rd Brigade, Kanawha Division, Western Virginia, to December 1861. Artillery, 1st Division, Army of the Ohio, to September 1862. Artillery, 1st Division, III Corps, Army of the Ohio, to November 1862. Artillery, 3rd Division, Center, XIV Corps, Army of the Cumberland, to January 1863. Artillery, 3rd Division, XIV Corps, to April 1864. Garrison Artillery, Nashville, Tennessee, Department of the Cumberland, to October 1864. 1st Division, Artillery Reserve, Army of the Cumberland, to November 1864. Artillery, 6th Division, Cavalry Corps, Military Division Mississippi, to February 1865. Artillery, 2nd Division, Cavalry Corps, Military Division Mississippi.

== Detailed service ==
Campaign in western Virginia July 6–17, 1861. Rich Mountain July 11–12. Carnifex Ferry September 13. Operations in Kanawha Valley and New River Region October 19-November 16. New River November 5–11-12. Ordered to Kentucky December 1861. Moved to Nashville, Tenn., February 10-March 2, 1862. March to Savannah, Tenn., March 20-April 8. Advance on and siege of Corinth, Miss., April 29-May 30. Buell's operations on the Memphis & Charleston Railroad in northern Alabama and middle Tennessee June to August 1862. March to Louisville, Ky., in pursuit of Bragg August 21-September 26. Pursuit of Bragg into Kentucky October 1–15. Battle of Perryville, Ky., October 8. March to Nashville, Tenn., November 4–17. Duty there and at Murfreesboro until June 1863. Expedition to Chapel Hill March 3–6. Expedition toward Columbia March 4–14. Harpeth River near Triune March 8. Action at Franklin June 4. Tullahoma Campaign June 23-July 7. Hoover's Gap June 24–26. Occupation of middle Tennessee until August 16. Passage of Cumberland Mountains and Tennessee River and Chickamauga Campaign August 16-September 22. Battle of Chickamauga September 19–21. Siege of Chattanooga, Tenn., September 24-November 23. Chattanooga-Ringgold Campaign November 23–27. At Chattanooga until March 1864, and garrison artillery at Nashville until October. Nashville Campaign November–December. Battle of Nashville December 15–16. Spring Hill December 18. Richland Creek December 24. King's Gap near Pulaski December 25. Sugar Creek December 25. Wilson's Raid to Macon, Ga., March 22-April 24, 1865. Near Montevallo March 31. Ebenezer Church near Maysville April 1. Selma April 2. Montgomery April 12. Columbus, Ga., April 16. Capture of Macon April 20.

== Commanders ==
- Captain Oscar A. Mack
- 1st Lieutenant Franklin Guest Smith

== Sources ==
- Dyer, Frederick H. A Compendium of the War of the Rebellion (Des Moines, IA: Dyer Pub. Co.), 1908.

Attribution

== See also ==
- List of United States Regular Army Civil War units
