= 4th U.S. Artillery, Battery H =

4th U.S. Light Artillery, Battery "H"
- Active: 1861–1865
- Country: United States
- Allegiance: Union
- Branch: Field Artillery Branch (United States)
- Engagements: American Civil War: Battle of Shiloh; Siege of Corinth; Battle of Perryville; Battle of Stones River; Tullahoma Campaign; Battle of Chickamauga; Siege of Chattanooga

Battery "H" 4th Regiment of Artillery was a light artillery battery that served in the Union Army during the American Civil War.

== Service ==
The battery was attached to 5th Division, Army of the Ohio, February to May 1862. (United with 4th U.S. Light Artillery, Battery M February 1862 to January 1863.) Artillery, 4th Division, Army of the Ohio, to September 1862. 10th Brigade, 4th Division, II Corps, Army of the Ohio, to November 1862. Artillery, 2nd Division, Left Wing, XIV Corps, Army of the Cumberland, to January 1863. Artillery, 2nd Division, XXI Corps, Army of the Cumberland, to October 1863. Artillery, 1st Division, IV Corps, Army of the Cumberland, to March 1864. 1st Division, Artillery Reserve, Department of the Cumberland, to October 1864. Transferred to Battery "I" 4th Artillery October 1864.

== Detailed service ==
Arrived at Louisville, Ky., January 1862. Moved to Nashville, Tenn., February 14–25, 1862; thence march to Savannah, Tenn., to reinforce Army of the Tennessee March 20-April 6. Battle of Shiloh, April 6–7. Advance on and siege of Corinth, Miss., April 29-May 30. Bridge Creek May 22. Tuscumbia Creek May 31. Buell's Campaign in northern Alabama and middle Tennessee June to August. March to Louisville, Ky., in pursuit of Bragg August 21-September 22. Pursuit of Bragg to London October 1–22. Battle of Perryville, Ky., October 8. Danville October 11. March to Nashville, Tenn., October 22-November 9, and duty there until December 26. Advance on Murfreesboro December 26–30. Battle of Stones River December 30–31, 1862 and January 1–3, 1863. At Murfreesboro until June. Tullahoma Campaign June 23-July 7. Occupation of middle Tennessee until August 16. Passage of Cumberland Mountains and Tennessee River and Chickamauga Campaign August 16-September 22. Battle of Chickamauga, September 19–20. Siege of Chattanooga, Tenn., September 24-November 23. Reopening Tennessee River October 26–29. Chattanooga-Ringgold Campaign November 23–27. Demonstration on Dalton, Ga., February 22–27, 1864. Near Dalton February 23. Tunnel Hill, Buzzard's Roost Gap and Rocky Faced Ridge February 23–25. Reserve Artillery at Nashville, Tenn., until October. Transferred to Battery "I" October 1864. Reorganized at Washington, D.C., February 1865, and duty in the defenses of that city until August 1865.

== Commanders ==
- Lieutenant S. Canby – commanded at the battle of Perryville
- Lieutenant Charles C. Parsons – commanded at the battle of Stones River
- Lieutenant Harry C. Cushing – commanded at the battle of Chickamauga

== Bibliography ==
- Dyer, Frederick H. (1959). A Compendium of the War of the Rebellion. New York and London. Thomas Yoseloff, Publisher. LCCN 59-12963.

== See also ==
- List of United States Regular Army Civil War units
