= 5th Air Defense Artillery Regiment =

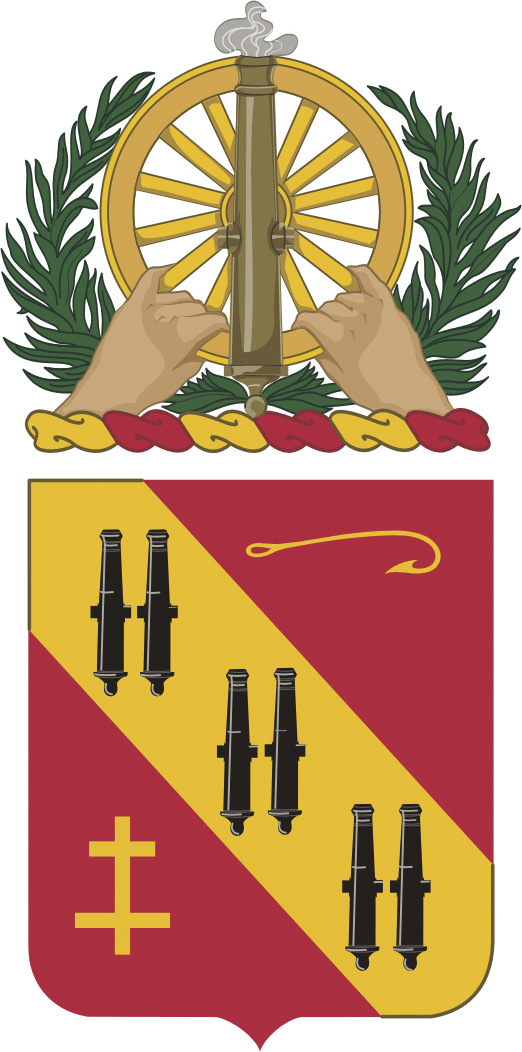
- Coat of arms
- Active: 1861
- Country: USA
- Branch: Army
- Type: Air defense artillery
- Mottos: "Volens et Potens" (Willing and Able).
- Engagements: American Civil War; World War II; Korean War; Vietnam War; Operation Iraqi Freedom
- Decorations: Meritorious Unit Commendation with oak leaf cluster

Commanders
- Notable commanders: Harvey Brown; Adelbert Ames

Insignia
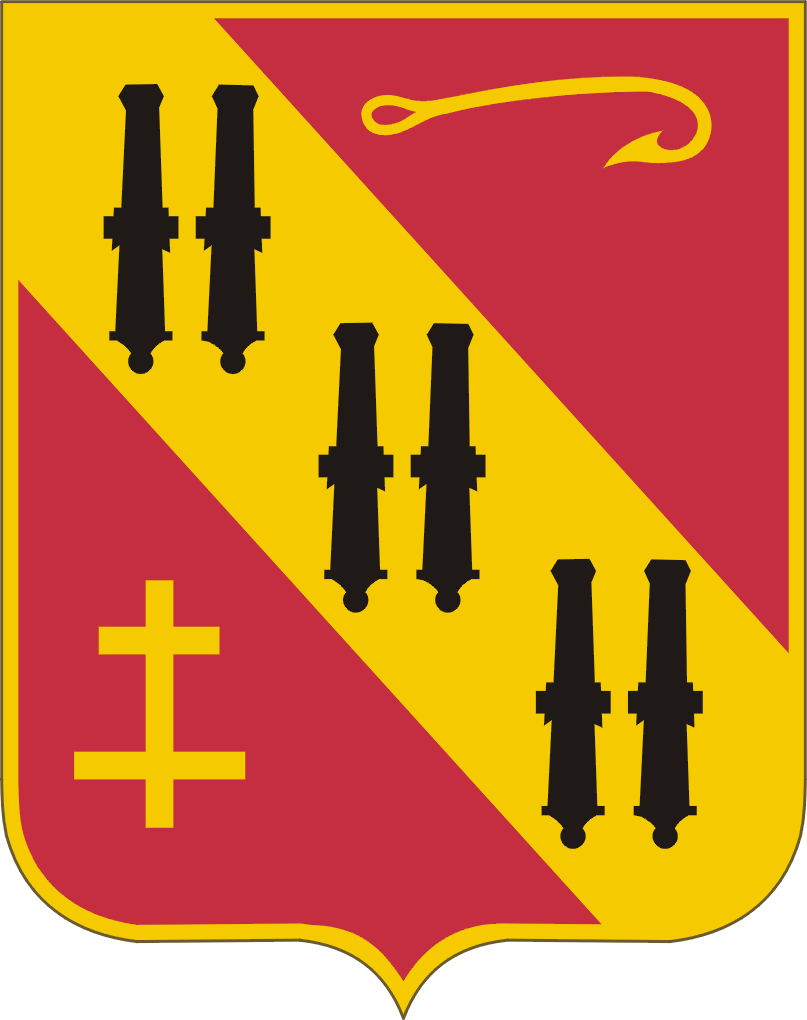
- Distinctive unit insignia

The 5th Air Defense Artillery Regiment is an Air Defense Artillery regiment of the United States Army, first formed in 1861 in the Regular Army as the 5th Regiment of Artillery.

== Lineage ==
On 4 May 1861, in conformity with the proclamation of the President, a new regiment of 12 batteries was added to the artillery arm of service and became known as the Fifth of the series. Congress confirmed this act of the President, 12 July (approved 29 July) of the same year, but all appointments dated from 14 May. The regiment was constituted on 18 June 1861 and organized on 4 July at Camp Greble, Pennsylvania, where the regiment initially assembled and trained.

Differing in organization from the older regiments, the new one comprised only field batteries, being in this regard the first entire regiment so equipped in the Regular Army. But it must not be inferred that the Fifth was designated by law as a light artillery regiment. "Nowhere in the act of 29 July do the words 'field or light artillery' occur, nevertheless, the batteries received the personnel belonging to field-artillery only. This, together with the other fact of the mounting, equipping and sending out as field artillery all the batteries, does not leave in doubt that Congress intended the Fifth to be a field artillery regiment."

Battery D was engaged at the first battle of Bull Run on 21 July 1861 (this battery was organized on 7 January 1861 at the U.S. Military Academy at West Point, and was known as the "West Point Battery"). Future major general Adelbert Ames was a 1st lieutenant in the battery during the battle and remained on the field to direct fire though severely wounded; he later received the Medal of Honor for this action. Colonel Harvey Brown, the regiment's first commander, led an expedition that reinforced and defended Fort Pickens, Florida in 1861. He was apparently detached from the regiment, as none of its batteries were on the expedition. He retired on 1 August 1863. Thomas W. Sherman was briefly the regiment's lieutenant colonel in 1861, during training at Camp Greble. In April 1862 the regimental headquarters moved to Fort Hamilton in Brooklyn, New York. The regiment's batteries were organized gradually from July 1861 through November 1862, with Battery D in existence from 7 January 1861. Seven batteries of the regiment were organized by the end of September 1861.

Four companies were assigned to Fort Jefferson, Florida on 10 November 1865, where they remained until relieved in 1869.

Order of battle information shows that batteries of the regiment deployed outside the U.S. in the Spanish–American War of 1898. However, no battle honors for this war are on the official lineage and honors certificate contained in Army Lineage Series: Air Defense Artillery (1985). Batteries B, D, and G deployed to Puerto Rico.

The regiment was broken up 13 February 1901 and its elements reorganized and redesignated as separate numbered companies and batteries of the Artillery Corps.

The regiment was reconstituted on 27 February 1924 and organized on 1 July 1924 in the Regular Army as the 5th Coast Artillery (U.S. Army Coast Artillery Corps (CAC)) and partially activated (headquarters and headquarters battery (HHB) only) at Fort Hamilton, New York in the Harbor Defenses of Southern New York. The regiment was organized by redesignating the 49th, 50th, 51st, 53rd, 54th, 55th, 56th, & 57th Cos, CAC. Batteries A, B, C, and G carried the lineage and designations of the corresponding batteries in the old 5th Artillery.

- Batteries A and B activated 1 August 1940 and 15 January 1941, respectively, at Fort Wadsworth, New York; Battery D activated 15 January 1941 at Fort Hamilton, New York.
- Battery A transferred to Fort Tilden 20 May 1943 until 11 March 1944.
- Battery B temporarily posted to Fort Hancock 16 September 1941 to 20 October 1941, returned to Fort Wadsworth until 18 April 1942, transferred to Fort Hancock 19 April 1942 until 10 May 1942, then returned to Fort Wadsworth until 20 May 1943, with temporary assignments at Fort Hamilton and Fort Totten during this period. Battery B transferred to Fort Tilden 20 May 1943 until 11 March 1944.
- Battery D remained at Fort Hamilton until transferred to Fort Wadsworth 30 July 1942, with temporary assignments to Fort Tilden 15 September-4 October 1941 and 16–23 May 1942. Assigned to Fort Tilden 20 May 1943 to 11 March 1944. Caretaking detachment for seacoast battery and fixed AA gun battery at Fort Totten until April 1942, when personnel reassigned to Battery F, 7th Coast Artillery, and Battery D transferred to Fort Hamilton, less personnel and equipment, until 9 September 1942. Battery D (presumably reorganized) moved to Fort Tilden 9 September 1942 to 11 March 1944. During this period, Battery D was temporarily posted to Forts Hamilton and Wadsworth at various times.
- Batteries C, E, F, and G not activated.

Regimental assets transferred to Harbor Defenses of New York and HHB released from Eastern Defense Command to IX Corps, Army Ground Forces 24 February 1944. Regiment transferred to Camp Rucker, Alabama on 13 March 1944 and inactivated there on 19 April 1944; then disbanded 26 June 1944.

5th Coast Artillery reconstituted 28 June 1950 in the Regular Army; regiment concurrently broken up and its elements redesignated as follows: Headquarters and Headquarters Battery consolidated with Headquarters and Headquarters Battery, 5th Antiaircraft Artillery Group (active) (see Annex 1), and consolidated unit designated as Headquarters and Headquarters Battery, 5th Antiaircraft Artillery Group. 2nd Battalion consolidated with the 214th Antiaircraft Artillery Gun Battalion (see Annex 2) and consolidated unit redesignated as the 24th Antiaircraft Artillery Battalion.

After 28 June 1950 the above units underwent changes as follows: Headquarters and Headquarters Battery, 5th Antiaircraft Artillery Group redesignated 20 March 1958 as Headquarters and Headquarters Battery, 5th Artillery Group. Inactivated 26 August 1960 at Camp Hanford, Washington.

24th Antiaircraft Artillery Battalion redesignated 13 March 1952 as the 24th Antiaircraft Gun Battalion. Activated 16 April 1952 in Korea. Inactivated 20 December in Korea. Redesignated 23 May 1955 as the 24th Antiaircraft Artillery Missile Battalion. Activated 1 June 1955 at Fort Banks, Massachusetts. Inactivated 1 September 1958 at Bedford, Massachusetts. Headquarters and Headquarters Battery, 5th Artillery Group; 24th Antiaircraft Artillery Missile battalion; 1st Battalion, 5th Coast Artillery; and the 5th Field Artillery Battalion (organized in 1907) consolidated, reorganized and redesignated 26 August 1960 as the 5th Artillery, a parent regiment under the Combat Arms Regimental System.

5th Artillery (less former 5th Field Artillery Battalion) reorganized and redesignated 1 September 1971 as the 5th Air Defense Artillery, a parent regiment under the Combat Arms Regimental System (former 5th Field Artillery Battalion concurrently reorganized and redesignated as the 5th Artillery – hereafter separate lineage, becoming the 5th Field Artillery Regiment, Field Artillery Branch). Withdrawn 16 November 1988 from the Combat Arms Regimental System and reorganized under the United States Army Regimental System with headquarters at Fort Stewart, Georgia.

=== Annex 1 (5th AAA Automatic Weapons Group) ===
Constituted 5 August 1942 in the Army of the United States as Headquarters and Headquarters Battery (HHB), 5th Antiaircraft Artillery Automatic Weapons Group (or 5th Coast Artillery Group (AA)). Activated 17 August 1942 at Camp Hulen, Texas.

Departed the United States 20 April 1943, arrived in North Africa 11 May 1943. Departed Oran, Algeria 21 September 1943 and landed south of Naples, Italy the same day.

Redesignated 18 February 1944 as HHB, 5th Antiaircraft Artillery Group while attached to 35th AAA Brigade under French Expeditionary Corps. Arrived at Anzio, Italy 25 April 1944 and departed Naples, Italy 12 August 1944. Assaulted southern France 15 August 1944; entered Germany 31 March 1945. Returned to Boston Port of Embarkation.

Inactivated 15 October 1945 at Camp Myles Standish, Massachusetts. Activated 1 August 1946 at Fort Bliss, Texas.

=== Annex 2 (1/504th Coast Artillery, 214th AAA Gun Battalion) ===
Constituted 5 May 1942 in the Army of the United States as the 1st Battalion, 504th Coast Artillery (Antiaircraft). Activated 1 July 1942 at Camp Hulen, Texas.

1st Battalion reorganized and redesignated 20 January 1943 as the 214th Coast Artillery Battalion (AA-Gun); other components became the 105th Coast Artillery Group and 630th and 356th Coast Artillery Battalions. Redesignated 13 November 1943 as the 214th Antiaircraft Artillery Gun Battalion.

Departed Boston Port of Embarkation 28 April 1943. Arrived in North Africa 11 May 1943. Moved to Sicily 19 July 1943; moved to Corsica 11 January 1944. Was in Bad Aibling, Germany in August 1945.

Inactivated 12 February 1946 at Camp Kilmer, New Jersey.

== Battalions ==
- 1st Battalion, 5th Air Defense Artillery Regiment (1-5th ADAR)
- 2nd Battalion, 5th Air Defense Artillery Regiment (2-5th ADAR)
- 3rd Battalion, 5th Air Defense Artillery Regiment (3-5th ADAR)
- 4th Battalion, 5th Air Defense Artillery Regiment (4-5th ADAR)
- 5th Battalion, 5th Air Defense Artillery Regiment (5-5th ADAR)

== Honors ==
=== Campaign participation credit ===
Civil War: Peninsula; Manassas; Antietam; Fredericksburg; Chancellorsville; Gettysburg; Wilderness; Spotsylvania; Cold Harbor; Petersburg; Shenandoah; Appomattox; Virginia 1862; Virginia 1863; Virginia 1864

World War II: Tunisia; Sicily; Naples-Foggia; Anzio; Rome-Arno; Southern France (with arrowhead); Rhineland; Ardennes-Alsace; Central Europe

Korean War: Second Korean Winter; Korea, Summer-Fall 1952; Third Korean Winter; Korea, Summer 1953

Vietnam: Defense; Counteroffensive; Counteroffensive, Phase II; Counteroffensive, Phase III; Tet Counteroffensive; Counteroffensive, Phase IV; Counteroffensive, Phase V; Counteroffensive, Phase VI; Tet 69/Counteroffensive; Summer-Fall 1969; Winter-Spring 1970

=== Decorations ===
- Meritorious Unit Commendation, streamer embroidered VIETNAM 1966-1967 (1st Battalion, 5th Artillery, 1968).
- Meritorious Unit Commendation, streamer embroidered VIETNAM 1967-1968 (lst Battalion, 5th Artillery, 1970).

== Coat of arms ==
- Shield

Gules, a bend or charged with six cannon paleways in pairs sable, between in sinister chief a fishhook fessways, ring to dexter, barb to base, and in dexter base a Lorraine Cross, both of the second (or).

- Crest

On a wreath of the colors, or and gules, upon a cannon wheel or partly surrounded by two palm branches vert the wheel grasped by two hands proper issuant chevronways from base, a bronze cannon paleways smoking of the last (proper).

- Motto

Volens et Potens (Willing and Able).

=== Symbolism ===
- Shield

The shield is scarlet for artillery. The fishhook, representative of the shape of the federal battle lines, alludes to the battle of Gettysburg. The cannon in pairs refer to the battle of New Market, 1864. The Lorraine Cross denotes service in Lorraine by an element of the regiment during World War I.

- Crest

The crest represents the gallant service of Lt. Richard Metcalf's battery (Batteries C and I combined) at Spotsylvania, 4–24 May 1864, when it charged earthworks firing its guns and then ran them up by hand to a new position, to the Bloody Angle, and fired repeatedly. This is purported to be the only recorded instance in the Civil War of a battery charging on breastworks.

== Distinctive unit insignia ==
The distinctive insignia is the shield of the coat of arms.

== See also ==
- 5th U.S. Artillery, Battery C
- 5th U.S. Artillery, Battery D
- 5th U.S. Artillery, Battery H
- 5th U.S. Artillery, Battery I
- 5th U.S. Artillery, Battery K
- Field Artillery Branch (United States)
- Air Defense Artillery Branch (United States)
- U.S. Army Coast Artillery Corps
