= 4th Air Defense Artillery Regiment =

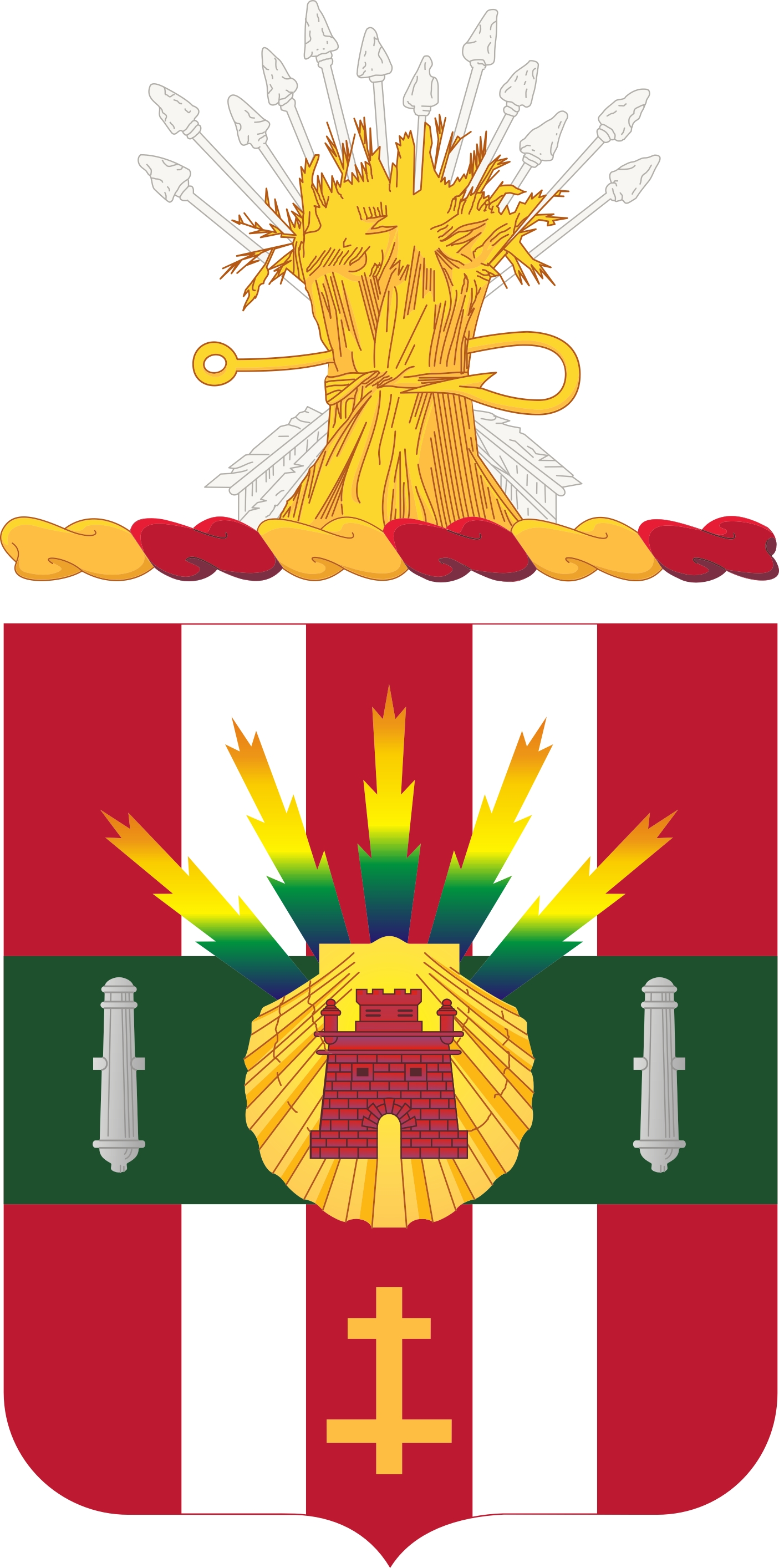
- Coat of arms
- Active: 1821 – present
- Country: USA
- Branch: Army
- Type: Air defense artillery
- Motto: "Nulli Vestigia Retrorsum" (No Step Backward)
- Engagements: War of 1812; Second Barbary War (3rd Battalion only); Indian Wars; Mexican War; American Civil War; World War II; Vietnam War; Grenada; Southwest Asia
- Decorations: Presidential Unit Citation; Valorous Unit Award; Meritorious Unit Commendation

Commanders
- Current commander: LTC Amanda Taylor
- Command Sergeant Major: CSM Lee K. Tucker
- Notable commanders: Lt. Stephen H. Weed; Lt. Bayard Wilkeson

Insignia
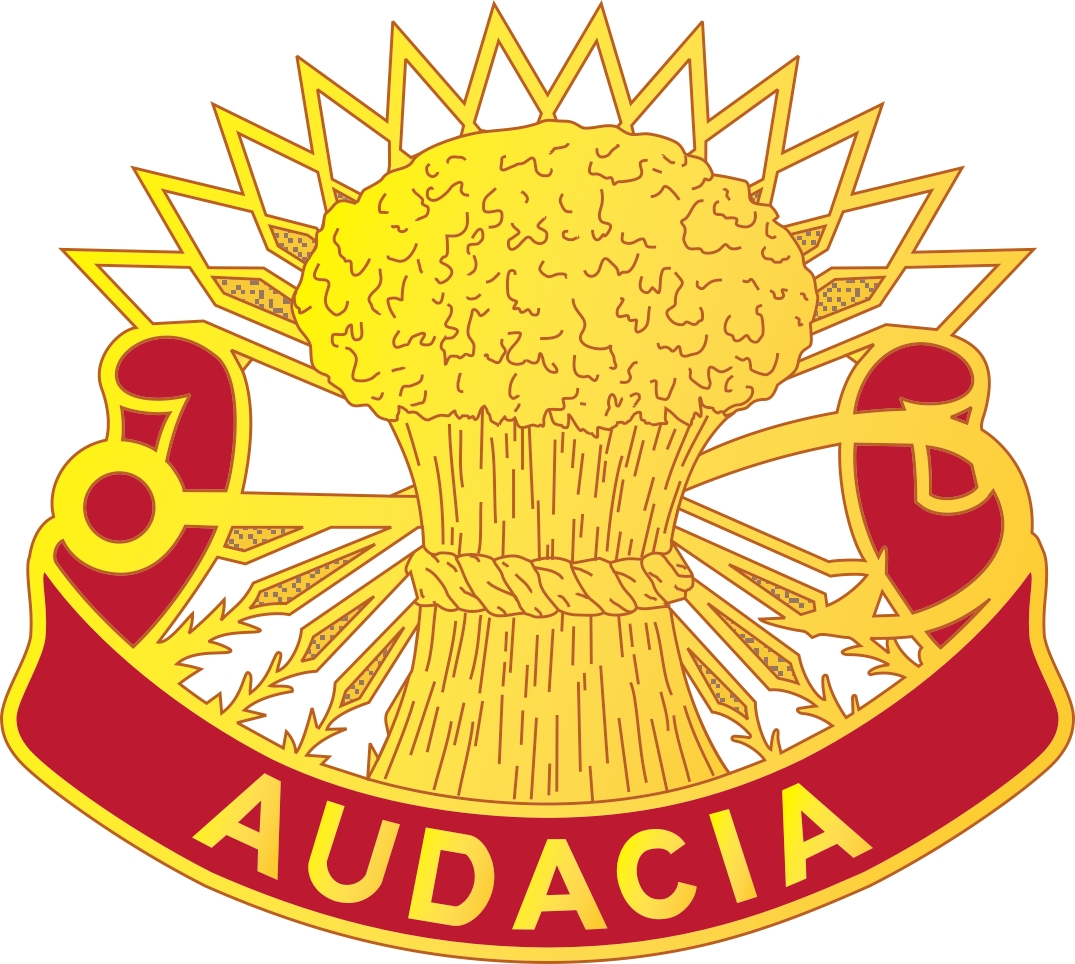
- Distinctive unit insignia

The 4th Air Defense Artillery Regiment was constituted 1 June 1821 in the Regular Army as the 4th Regiment of Artillery and organized from new and existing units with headquarters at Pensacola, Florida. As a result of the division of the Artillery Corps into Coast and Field Artillery units, the Regiment was broken up 13 February 1901, and its elements reorganized and redesignated as separate numbered companies and batteries of the Artillery Corps.

== Early lineage ==
Constituted 1 June 1821 in the Regular Army as the 4th Regiment of Artillery and organized from new and existing units with headquarters at Pensacola, Florida. The lineages of some of the units that initially made up the 4th U.S. Artillery include campaign credit for the War of 1812. Company F carried the lineage of Alexander Hamilton's New York Provincial Company of Artillery from this time until the regiment was broken up on 13 February 1901, with the lineage eventually transferred to the 1st Battalion, 5th Field Artillery Regiment.

Lieutenant Stephen H. Weed commanded Battery B during the Utah War in 1860, and was killed at Gettysburg in 1863 as an infantry brigade commander.

Twelve batteries of the regiment served in the American Civil War. Battery B was part of the Union Army's crack Iron Brigade in the Army of the Potomac. 1st Lieutenant Bayard Wilkeson was killed commanding Battery G at Gettysburg and posthumously received brevet promotions to lieutenant colonel.

Order of battle information shows that batteries of the regiment deployed outside the U.S. in the Spanish–American War of 1898. However, no battle honors for this war are on the official lineage and honors certificate dated 30 September 1996. Batteries F, G, and H were at the Siege of Santiago, the latter two comprising the siege train.

Regiment broken up 13 February 1901 and its elements reorganized and redesignated as separate numbered companies and batteries of the Artillery Corps.

== 4th Coast Artillery Regiment ==
The regiment was reconstituted on 1 July 1924 in the Regular Army as the 4th Coast Artillery (Harbor Defense) (Type C). Changes in the regimental organization were as follows:

Activated (less Batteries B, E, and F) 18 August 1924 at Fort Amador in the Panama Canal Zone, part of the Harbor Defenses of Balboa on the Pacific side of the Panama Canal. The regiment was organized by redesignating the 38th, 39th, 40th, 41st, 42nd, 43rd, 44th, 45th, 46th, 47th, and 48th companies of the Coast Artillery Corps (CAC). Batteries C, D, E, G, H, I, and K carried the lineage and designations of the corresponding batteries in the old 4th Artillery.
(Battery C inactivated 31 July 1926 at Fort Amador, Canal Zone;
Batteries B, C, and F activated 15 April 1932 at Fort Amador, Canal Zone;
Battery E activated 1 February 1938 at Fort Amador, Canal Zone;
Battery O activated 15 March 1940 in the Canal Zone;
Batteries M and N activated 14 October 1940 in the Canal Zone;
Battery L activated 27 January 1941 in the Canal Zone)

The Regiment (less Headquarters and Headquarters Battery (HHB)) was disbanded 3 October 1944 in the Canal Zone. Afterwards, the regiment underwent more changes with the HHB, 4th Coast Artillery Regiment, reorganized and redesignated 1 November 1944 as HHB, 4th Coast Artillery Group. The remainder of the regimental assets were used to organize the 4th Coast Artillery Battalion.

- Regiment (less HHB) reconstituted 12 October 1944 in the Regular Army, concurrently consolidated with the 4th Coast Artillery Battalion (constituted 3 October 1944 in the Army of the United States) and consolidated unit designated as the 4th Coast Artillery Battalion;

Activated 1 November 1944 in the Canal Zone
Disbanded (less Batteries A and D) 1 February 1946 in the Canal Zone (Batteries A and D concurrently redesignated as Batteries A and D, Harbor Defenses of Balboa;
inactivated 15 January 1947 and 15 May 1950, respectively, in the Canal Zone) 4th Coast Artillery Battalion (less Batteries A and D)
reconstituted 28 June 1950 in the Regular Army; concurrently, battalion and Batteries A and D, Harbor Defenses of Balboa, redesignated as the 4th Coast Artillery Regiment (less Headquarters and Headquarters Battery)

- Remainder of the 4th Coast Artillery Regiment reorganized 28 June 1951 as follows:
- 1st Battalion consolidated with the 4th Antiaircraft Artillery Automatic Weapons Battalion (active) (see below under 3/95th CA (AA)) and consolidated unit designated as the 4th Antiaircraft Artillery Automatic Weapons Battalion

Redesignated 31 July 1950 as the 4th Antiaircraft Artillery Battalion
Inactivated 16 June 1957 in England

- 2nd Battalion redesignated as the 20th Antiaircraft Artillery Battalion

Redesignated 13 March 1952 as the 20th Antiaircraft Artillery Gun Battalion
Activated 8 May 1952 at Fort Lewis, Washington
Redesignated 1 May 1953 as the 20th Antiaircraft Artillery Battalion
Inactivated 20 December 1957 at Phantom Lake, Bellevue, Washington

- 3rd Battalion redesignated as the 44th Antiaircraft Artillery Battalion

Redesignated 1 April 1951 as the 44th Antiaircraft Artillery Gun Battalion and activated at Fort Stewart, Georgia
Redesignated 3 August 1953 as the 44th Antiaircraft Artillery Battalion
Redesignated 22 March 1955 as the 44th Antiaircraft Artillery Missile Battalion
Inactivated 1 September 1958 at Niagara Falls, New York

== 4th Coast Artillery Group and 4th Coast Artillery Battalion ==
The 4th Coast Artillery Group was redesignated from (probably HHB) 4th Coast Artillery Regiment on 1 November 1944 in the Panama Canal Zone, where redesignated as the Harbor Defenses of Balboa on 2 January 1945.

The 4th Coast Artillery Battalion was constituted 3 October 1944 and activated 1 November 1944; in August 1945 Battery C was located at Seymour Island, Galápagos. The 4th CA Battalion was inactivated (less Batteries A and D) on 1 February 1946. Batteries A and D became the corresponding batteries of the Harbor Defenses of Balboa; Battery A was inactivated on 15 January 1947 and Battery D was inactivated on 15 May 1950.

== 4th Antiaircraft Artillery Group ==
HHB, 4th Coast Artillery Regiment was consolidated again on 28 June 1950 with HHB, 4th Antiaircraft Artillery Group (see below), and designated as the HHB, 4th Antiaircraft Artillery Group, activated 1 September 1951 at Ladd Air Force Base, Alaska and inactivated 15 January 1958 at Ladd Air Force Base, Alaska.

Under the Combat Arms Regimental System (CARS) the HHB, 4th Antiaircraft Artillery Group was consolidated and reorganized to include:

4th Antiaircraft Artillery Battalion;
20th Antiaircraft Artillery Battalion;
44th Antiaircraft Artillery Missile Battalion

== 4th Air Defense Artillery ==
The 4th Field Artillery Battalion (organized in 1907) consolidated, reorganized, and redesignated 1 September 1958 as the 4th Artillery, a parent regiment under the Combat Arms Regimental System. The 4th Artillery Regiment (less former 4th Field Artillery Battalion) was again reorganized and redesignated 1 September 1971 as the 4th Air Defense Artillery, a parent regiment under the Combat Arms Regimental System (former 4th Field Artillery Battalion concurrently reorganized and redesignated as the 4th Field Artillery Regiment – hereafter separate lineage).

A battalion of the regiment, the 1st, later redesignated the 4th Missile Battalion (Nike-Hercules), 4th Artillery, 26th Artillery Group (Air Defense) had its headquarters at Fort Lawton, Washington in the 1960s and early 1970s while operating Nike-Hercules missiles as part of the U.S. Army Air Defense Command (ARADCOM).

The regiment was withdrawn on 13 September 1986 from the Combat Arms Regimental System and reorganized under the United States Army Regimental System.

=== HHB, 4th Antiaircraft Artillery Group ===
- Constituted 5 August 1942 in the Army of the United States as HHB, 4th Antiaircraft Artillery Automatic Weapons Group (or 4th Coast Artillery Group (AA)).
- Activated 24 August 1942 at Camp Stewart, Georgia.
- Group departed the United States 7 February 1943 for North Africa.
- Arrived in North Africa on 21 February 1943, and landed on Sicily during August 1943, and moved on to Italy on 26 October 1943.
- Redesignated 1 May 1944 as HHB, 4th Antiaircraft Artillery Group (Searchlight Operations).
- Inactivated 9 December 1944 at Barberino, Italy, with assets and personnel reassigned to the 1168th Engineer Combat Group.
- Reconstituted 28 June 1950 in the Regular Army.

=== 3/95th Coast Artillery Regiment (AA) (Semimobile) ===
The lineage of the 4th AAA Auto-Weapons Battalion is traced through the 3/95th Coast Artillery Battalion (AA) as follows:

- Constituted 13 January 1941 (or 16 December 1940) in the Regular Army as the 95th Coast Artillery Regiment (Antiaircraft).
- Activated 17 April 1941 at Camp Davis, North Carolina.
- Regiment staged at Fort McDowell, California on 21 December 1941.
- Regiment deployed to Hawaii from the San Francisco Port of Embarkation on 26 December 1941, and arrived in Hawaii on 7 January 1942.
- Regiment reorganized and redesignated 12 December 1943 as follows:

HHB became HHB 138th AAA Group, thereafter separate lineage.
1/95th CAR became the 93rd AAA Gun Battalion, thereafter separate lineage.
2/95th CAR became the 752nd AAA Gun Battalion, thereafter separate lineage.
3/95th CAR became the 866th Antiaircraft Artillery Automatic Weapons Battalion:

- Battalion arrived on the Philippines on 20 October 1944.
- Battalion arrived on Okinawa on 26 April 1945, where it remained into the Occupation period.
- Inactivated 30 September 1946 in the Philippine Islands.
- Redesignated 13 October 1948 as the 4th Antiaircraft Artillery Automatic Weapons Battalion.
- Activated 15 January 1949 at Fort Bliss, Texas.

== Present day ==
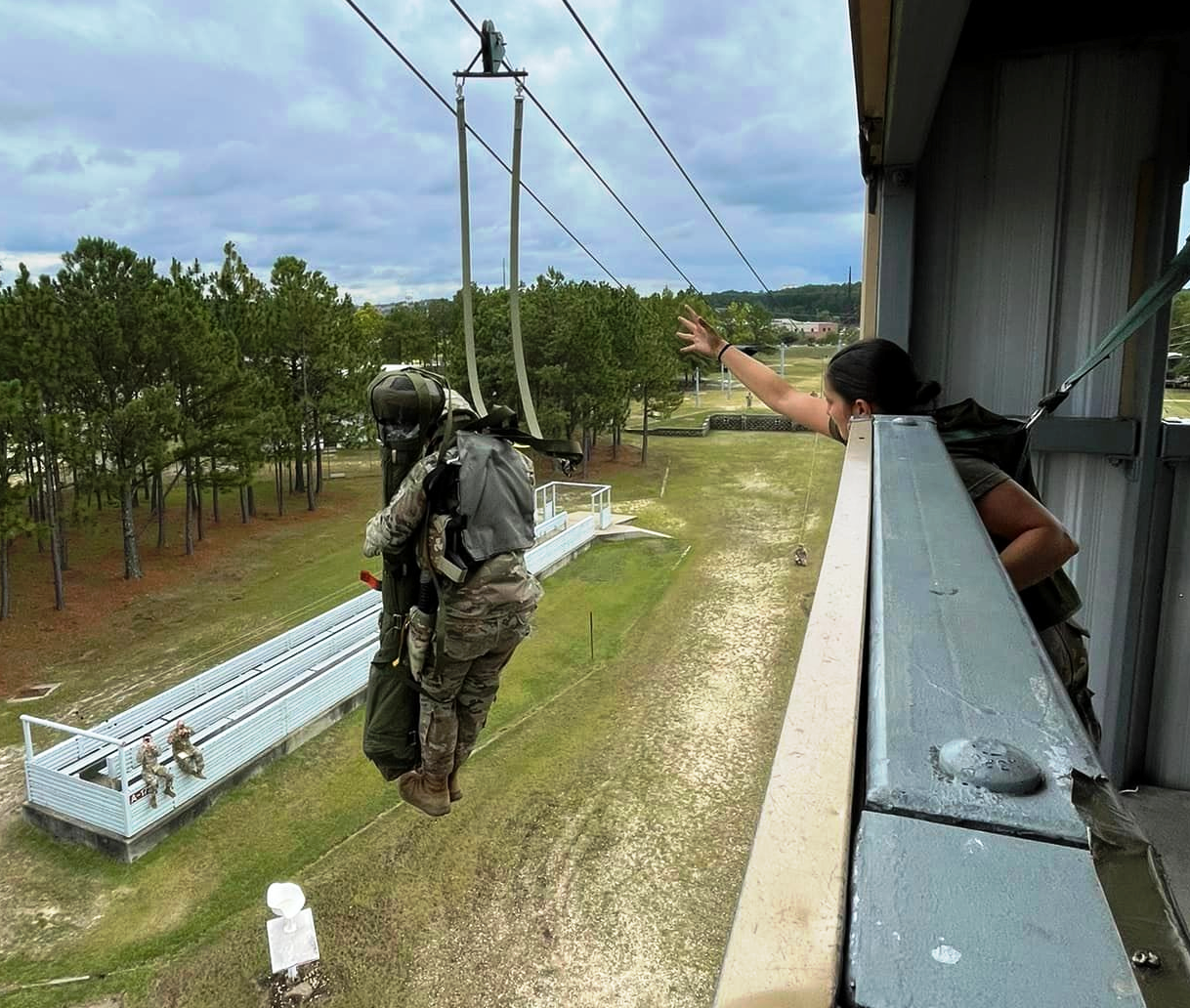
A paratrooper with E Battery, 3rd Battalion, 4th ADAR practices jumping from a 34–foot tower with the FIM-92 Stinger and the new "weapon exposed apparatus"

in 2025, the 3rd Division Air Defense Battalion, 4th Air Defense Artillery was put under the command of the 82and Airborne Division, "bringing counter-UAS and Maneuver-Short Range Air Defense (M-SHORAD) capabilities" to increase "the Division's protection capability and preparation to win the first fight at night", according to an official 82nd Airborne Division Facebook post. 3rd battalion was previously under the 108th Air Defense Artillery Brigade at Fort Bragg. Of note, 3rd Battalion, 4th ADAR is the only airborne air defense artillery formation in the U.S. Army.

Active battalions of the 4th ADAR:

- 1st Battalion, 4th ADAR, 11th Air Defense Artillery Brigade, 32nd Army Air and Missile Defense Command
- 2nd Battalion, 4th ADAR, 108th Air Defense Artillery Brigade, 32nd Army Air and Missile Defense Command
- 3rd Division Air Defense Battalion (Airborne), 4th ADAR, 82nd Airborne Division
- 5th Battalion, 4th ADAR, 10th Army Air and Missile Defense Command

== Honors ==
=== Campaign participation credit ===
War of 1812: Louisiana 1815

Indian Wars: Creeks; Seminoles; Modocs; Little Big Horn; Nez Perces; Bannocks

Mexican War: Palo Alto; Resaca de la Palma; Monterey; Vera Cruz; Cerro Gordo; Contreras; Chapultepec; Tamaulipas 1846

Civil War: Peninsula; Shiloh; Valley; Manassas; Antietam; Fredericksburg; Murfreesborough; Chancellorsville; Gettysburg; Chickamauga; Chattanooga; Wilderness; Spotsylvania; Cold Harbor; Petersburg; Shenandoah; Nashville; Appomattox; Virginia 1861; Virginia 1862; Virginia 1863; Virginia 1864; Virginia 1865; Mississippi 1862

World War II: American Theater, streamer without inscription; Tunisia; Sicily; Naples-Foggia; Rome-Arno; Leyte; Ryukyus

Vietnam:

- 2nd (105 mm howitzers, towed), 5th (155 mm howitzers, self-propelled) and 8th Battalions (175 mm gun, self-propelled), 4th Artillery:
- Counteroffensive, Phase II; Counteroffensive, Phase III; Tet Counteroffensive; Counteroffensive, Phase IV; Counteroffensive, Phase V; Counteroffensive, Phase VI; Tet 69/Counteroffensive; Summer-Fall 1969; Winter-Spring 1970; Sanctuary Counteroffensive; Counteroffensive, Phase VII; Consolidation I

Armed Forces Expeditions: Grenada

Southwest Asia: Defense of Saudi Arabia; Liberation and Defense of Kuwait

=== Decorations ===
- Presidential Unit Citation (Army), streamer embroidered VIETNAM 1967 (8th Battalion [less Battery B], 4th Artillery, 1973)
- Valorous Unit Award, streamer embroidered SAIGON (2nd Battalion, 4th Artillery, 1970)
- Meritorious Unit Commendation (Army), streamer embroidered VIETNAM 1968–1969 (8th Battalion, 4th Artillery, 1970)
- Army Superior Unit Award for 1987
- Valorous Unit Award 1st Battalion 4th ADA 2004 OIF

== Coat of arms ==
- Shield

Gules, two pallets argent, on and over a fess vert between in chief overall five rays beveled counter beveled issuant fanwise blended from base blue through green and yellow to orange and in base a Lorraine Cross or, an escallop of the last charged with a Spanish castle of the first and between two cannon palewise of the second.

- Crest

On a wreath of the colors, or and gules, a sheaf of twelve arrows argent behind a garb pierced by a fishhook fesswise, hook to sinister and base, or.

- Motto

Audacia (By Daring Deeds).

=== Symbolism ===
- Shield

The shield is scarlet for artillery and with the two white stripes, representative of the campaign streamer of the War of 1812, depicts the age of some of the units of the regiment. The green fess refers to Mexican War service, and the two silver cannon allude to those lost without dishonor and regained with glory during that war. The escallop, the emblem of St. James, with the Spanish castle, represents the battle of Santiago, Cuba, in which elements of the regiment participated. The Lorraine Cross signifies the service of a battery of the regiment in Lorraine during World War I. The five rays, indicative of the aurora borealis, denote the service of batteries of the regiment in Alaska.

- Crest

The garb and fishhook commemorate participation in the battle of Gettysburg in the wheat field, the fishhook being the shape of the federal battle line. The arrows denote the Indian campaigns.

== Distinctive unit insignia ==
The distinctive insignia is an adaptation of the crest and motto of the coat of arms.

== Commemorations ==
A 4th U.S. Artillery Regimental Brass Band exists that depicts the regimental band during the Civil War.

== See also ==
- 4th U.S. Artillery, Battery A
- 4th U.S. Artillery, Battery B
- 4th U.S. Artillery, Battery C
- 4th U.S. Artillery, Battery G
- 4th U.S. Artillery, Battery H
- 4th U.S. Artillery, Battery I
- 4th U.S. Artillery, Battery K
- 4th U.S. Artillery, Battery M
- Field Artillery Branch (United States)
- Air Defense Artillery Branch (United States)
- U.S. Army Coast Artillery Corps

== Sources ==
- Berhow, Mark A., ed. (2015). American Seacoast Defenses, A Reference Guide (Third ed.). McLean, Virginia: CDSG Press. ISBN 978-0-9748167-3-9.
- Gaines, William C., Coast Artillery Organizational History, 1917-1950, Coast Defense Journal, vol. 23, issue 2
- Stanton, Shelby L. (1991). World War II Order of Battle. Galahad Books. ISBN 0-88365-775-9.
- Stanton, Shelby L. (2003). Vietnam Order of Battle. Stackpole Books. ISBN 978-0-8117007-1-9.
