= Field Artillery Branch =

Branch of the US Army

Field Artillery
- Field Artillery branch insignia, featuring two crossed field guns
- Active: November 17, 1775; 250 years ago
- Country: United States
- Branch: United States Army
- Type: Combat arms
- Home station: Fort Sill, Oklahoma, United States
- Nicknames: King of Battle, Red Legs
- Patron: Saint Barbara
- Color: Scarlet

Insignia
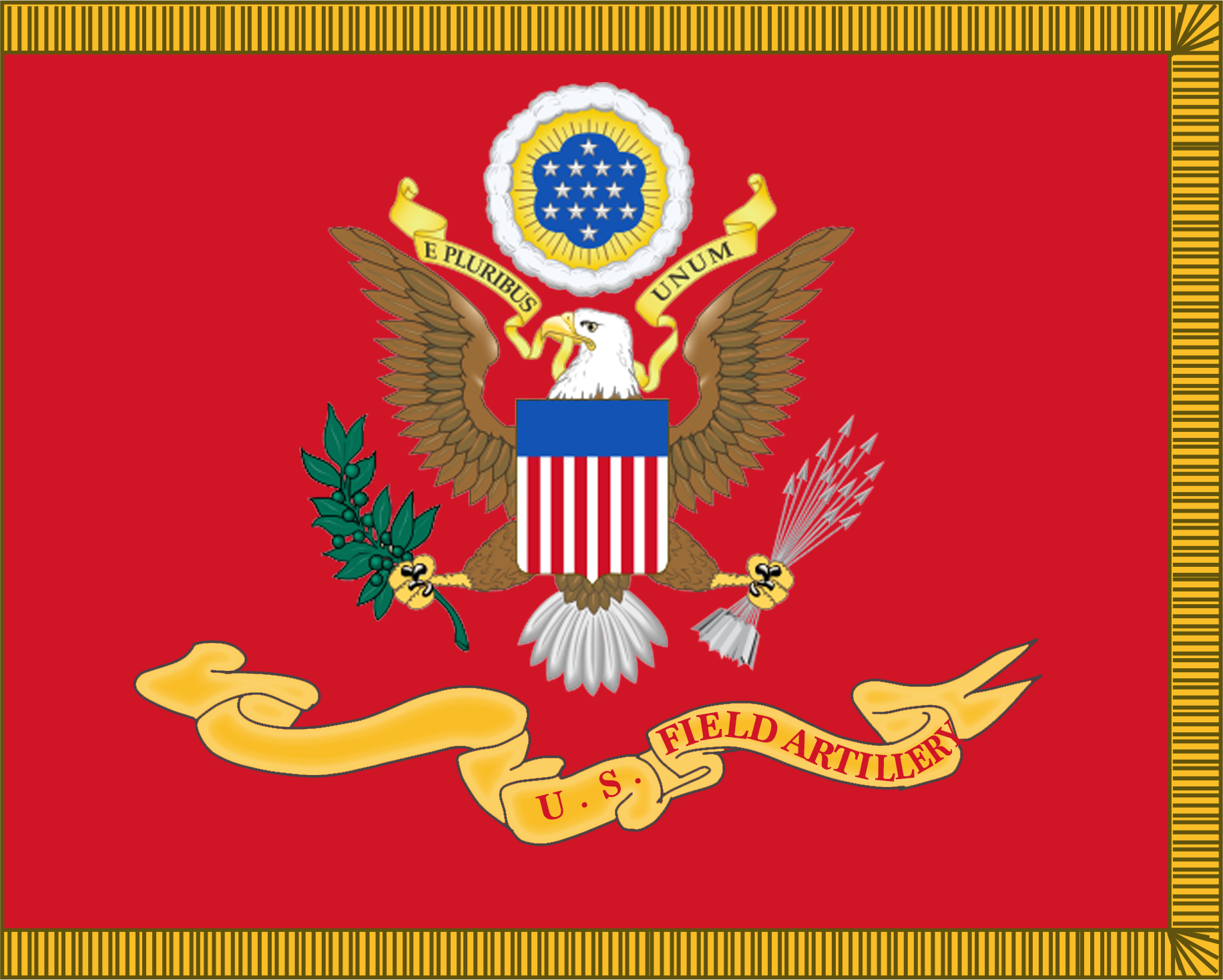
- US Army Field Artillery Corps Standard c. 1917

The Field Artillery Branch of the United States Army is part of the "Maneuver, Fires and Effects" (MFE) classification, in accordance with current organizational doctrine.

== Historical background ==
The U.S. Army Field Artillery branch traces its origins to 17 November 1775 when the Continental Congress, unanimously elected Henry Knox "Colonel of the Regiment of Artillery". The regiment formally entered service on 1 January 1776. During the 19th century a total of seven Artillery regiments were formed which contained a mixture of "heavy" artillery companies and "light" artillery batteries. The light artillery batteries took the role of field artillery although they did not use that designation. The seven artillery regiments were designated as regiments of artillery and were not distinguished as being either "coast" or "field" artillery as was the practice in the 20th century.

In the reorganization of the Army by an act of Congress passed on 2 February 1901, the seven Artillery regiments were reorganized as the Artillery Corps. The Corps was also split into 195 battery-sized units (called companies at the time) of Field Artillery and Coast Artillery. In 1907, the Artillery Corps was reorganized into the Field Artillery and the Coast Artillery Corps. Although presently Field Artillery and Air Defense Artillery are separate branches, both inherit the traditions of the Artillery branch.

In 1907, the Field Artillery companies of the Artillery Corps were organized into six Field Artillery regiments. In 1916, as the United States was preparing for its eventual entry into World War I, these six regiments were supplemented by 15 more Field Artillery regiments. During World War I numerous other Field Artillery Regiments were organized in the National Guard and National Army, which were mobilized to supplement the Regular Army.

=== Lineage ===
In 1924 the Army organized the Coast Artillery Corps into regiments. The first seven regiments retained the lineage of the seven Artillery regiments which existed in the 19th century. The Coast Artillery Corps was disbanded in 1950 and its units were consolidated with the Field Artillery in the Artillery branch. In 1968 the Artillery branch divided into Field Artillery and Air Defense Artillery branches with the newly formed 1st through 7th Air Defense Artillery regiments retaining the lineage of the seven 19th century artillery regiments.

Although the oldest Artillery regiments in the Army are in the Air Defense Artillery branch, this is not necessarily the case for individual units below the regimental level. For example, the 1st Battalion of the 5th Field Artillery traces its lineage to the Alexander Hamilton Battery, formed in 1776, which is the oldest Artillery unit in the active United States Army and is the only Regular Army unit which can trace its lineage to the American Revolution.

The oldest Field Artillery unit in the U.S. Army is the 1st Battalion, 101st Field Artillery, Massachusetts Army National Guard, which traces its origins to December 1636. Originally an Infantry unit, it was reorganized as an Artillery unit in 1916.

== Mission statement ==
The mission of the Field Artillery is to destroy, defeat, or disrupt the enemy with integrated fires to enable maneuver commanders to dominate in unified land operations.

== History ==
The Field Artillery is one of the Army's combat arms, traditionally one of the three major branches (with Infantry and Armor). It refers to those units that use artillery weapons systems to deliver surface-to-surface long range indirect fire. Indirect fire means that the projectile does not follow the line of sight to the target. Mortars are not field artillery weapons; they are organic to infantry units and are manned by infantry personnel (US Army MOS 11C or USMC 0341).

The term field artillery is distinguished from the Air Defense Artillery, and historically, from the U.S. Army Coast Artillery Corps (with the function of coastal defense artillery), a branch which existed from 1901 to 1950. In 1950, the two branches were unified and called simply Artillery, until Air Defense Artillery was made into a separate branch in 1968. The insignia of the Field Artillery branch is a pair of crossed field guns (19th-century-style cannon) in gold, and dates back to 1834.

The home of the Field Artillery and the Field Artillery School are at Fort Sill, Oklahoma.

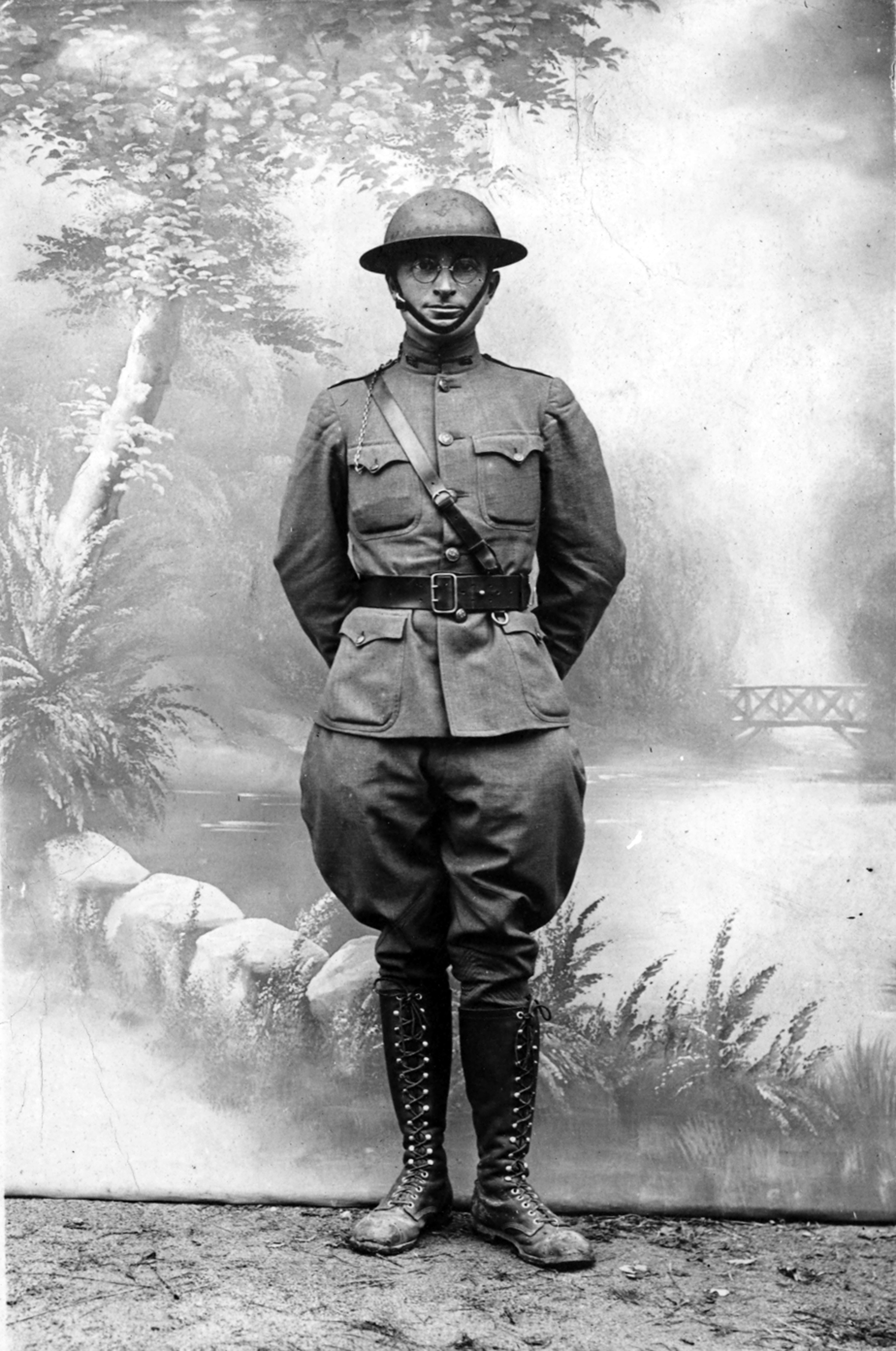
Captain Harry S. Truman in 1918, the only "redleg" to become president

Field artillery is called the "King of Battle". Conflicts in the 20th century saw artillery become exponentially more effective as indirect fire methods were introduced immediately prior to World War I. During World War I and World War II, field artillery was the single highest casualty-producing weapons system on any battlefield.

Soldiers from artillery units have often been used as infantry during both the Iraq War and the War in Afghanistan. While field artillery units have often performed admirably as infantry and accomplished infantry missions, such use has led to the atrophy of essential field artillery specific skills and tasks.

=== Branch colors ===
Members of the Field Artillery are referred to as "redlegs" because during the Mexican–American War, both Ringgold's Battery and Duncan's Battery were issued uniforms distinguished by scarlet stripes down the legs of their uniform pants, a practice continued through the Civil War and on dress uniforms even after WWI.

Scarlet was established as the Artillery Branch color along with crossed cannon branch insignia in the Regulations of 1833. Branch colors are found on the shoulder straps of officers ranking colonel and below wearing the blue dress uniform and on the branch of service scarves authorized for wear with a variety of uniforms.

=== Chief of Field Artillery ===
From 1903 to 1908, one Chief of Artillery oversaw both field artillery and coast artillery. The Chiefs of Artillery from this time were:

1. Brigadier General Wallace F. Randolph, 1903–1904
2. Brigadier General John Patten Story, 1904–1905
3. Brigadier General Samuel M. Mills, 1905–1906
4. Brigadier General Arthur Murray, 1906–1908 (became the first Chief of Coast Artillery)

After 1908, one general served as Chief of Coast Artillery which had a corps structure, while the Field Artillery had a regimental structure and had no chief or corps designation.

This disorganized Field Artillery occasioned a boardroom bloodletting in December 1917 after the entry of the US into the First World War in April 1917 proved that the Quartermaster General of the United States Army Henry Granville Sharpe was unfit for this purpose. In the aftermath of bloody Tuesday Brigadier general William J. Snow was appointed to the unofficial post of Chief of Field Artillery in February 1918. He continued in that post after it was codified into law in 1920. He served until retiring in 1927, and oversaw the artillery branch's postwar reorganization, including the beginning of testing and experimentation to determine how to transition from horse drawn equipment to mechanized, and modernize processes for directing and controlling indirect fire to improve speed and accuracy.

After 1920, the Chief of Coast Artillery was joined by the Chief of Field Artillery. From 1920 to 1942, the Field Artillery corps was led by a branch chief who held the rank of major general. This was in keeping with the Army's other major branches, including infantry, cavalry, and coast artillery. Each chief was responsible for planning and overseeing execution of training, equipping, and manning within his branch.

The branch chief positions were eliminated in 1942, and their functions consolidated under the commander of the Army Ground Forces as a way to end inter-branch rivalries and enable synchronized and coordinated activities as part of World War II's combined arms doctrine. The Chiefs of Field Artillery from this time were:

1. Major General William J. Snow, 1920–1927
2. Major General Fred T. Austin, 1927–1930
3. Major General Harry G. Bishop, 1930–1934
4. Major General Upton Birnie Jr., 1934–1938
5. Major General Robert M. Danford, 1938–1942

== Publications ==
The professional journal of the Field Artillery is published at Fort Sill. Known as the Field Artillery Journal in 1911, it went through many name changes through Field Artillery in 1987. The journal merged with Air Defense Artillery in 2007 to become Fires.

== Current weapon systems ==
The U.S. Army employs five types of field artillery weapon systems:

- M119A3 105 mm light towed howitzer
- M777A2 155 mm medium towed howitzer
- M109A7 Paladin 155 mm self-propelled howitzer
- M142 High Mobility Rocket Artillery System (HIMARS), a wheeled launcher capable of firing 227 mm rockets or Army Tactical Missile System (ATACMS) missiles
- M270A1 Multiple Launch Rocket System (MLRS), a self-propelled launcher capable of firing 227 mm rockets or Army Tactical Missile System (ATACMS) missiles

=== Long Range Precision Fires ===
Long Range Precision Fires (LRPF) was a priority of the U.S. Army Futures Command (AFC), disbanded in October 2025. The aim was to modernize a suite of capabilities of the artillery. (Note: The proponent for the Field Artillery Branch is defined in §Army Regulation AR 5-22, and acts in concert with Army Staff. In Force modernization, Deputy Chiefs of Staff G-8 and G-3/5/7 sit on the Army Requirements Oversight Council (AROC), to advise the Chief of Staff of the Army (CSA). The commander, AFC is responsible for Force design.: The Army's Force management model begins with a projection of the Future operating environment, in terms of resources: political, military, economic, social, information, infrastructure, physical environment, and the time available to bring the Current army to bear on the situation.; The AROC serves as a discussion forum of these factors.; The relevant strategy is provided by the Army's leadership.; A DOTMLPF analysis models the factors necessary to change the Current force into a relevant Future force.; A JCIDS process identifies the gaps in capability between Current and Future force.; A Force design to meet the materiel gaps is underway.; An organization with the desired capabilities (manpower, materiel, training) is brought to bear on each gap.; AR 5-22(pdf) lists the Force modernization proponent for each Army branch, which can be a CoE or Branch proponent leader.; Staff uses a Synchronization meeting before seeking approval —HTAR Force Management 3-2b: "Managing change in any large, complex organization requires the synchronization of many interrelated processes".; A budget request is submitted to Congress.; The resources are "dictated by Congress".; Approved requests then await resource deliveries which then become available to the combatant commanders.) LRPF appears to be a

- project of an AFC cross-functional team (CFT), a
- requirements definition process for new capabilities, such as targeting the new one-thousand-mile (1,600 km) missiles, "streamlining the sensor-shooter link at every echelon"—Col (Promotable) John Rafferty, for a
- Strategic Long Range Cannon (SLRC) for a hypersonic projectile (program cancelled in May 2022), a
- target capability for the Field Artillery (its howitzers) and Air Defense Artillery (a 500 km missile), and a
- test case for the acquisition process of the U.S. Army such as the Long-Range Hypersonic Weapon (LRHW), a standoff weapon to be fielded by FY2023. The LRHW has been named Dark Eagle by the US Army.

== Future weapon systems ==
=== Long Range Precision Fires (LRPF) CFT ===
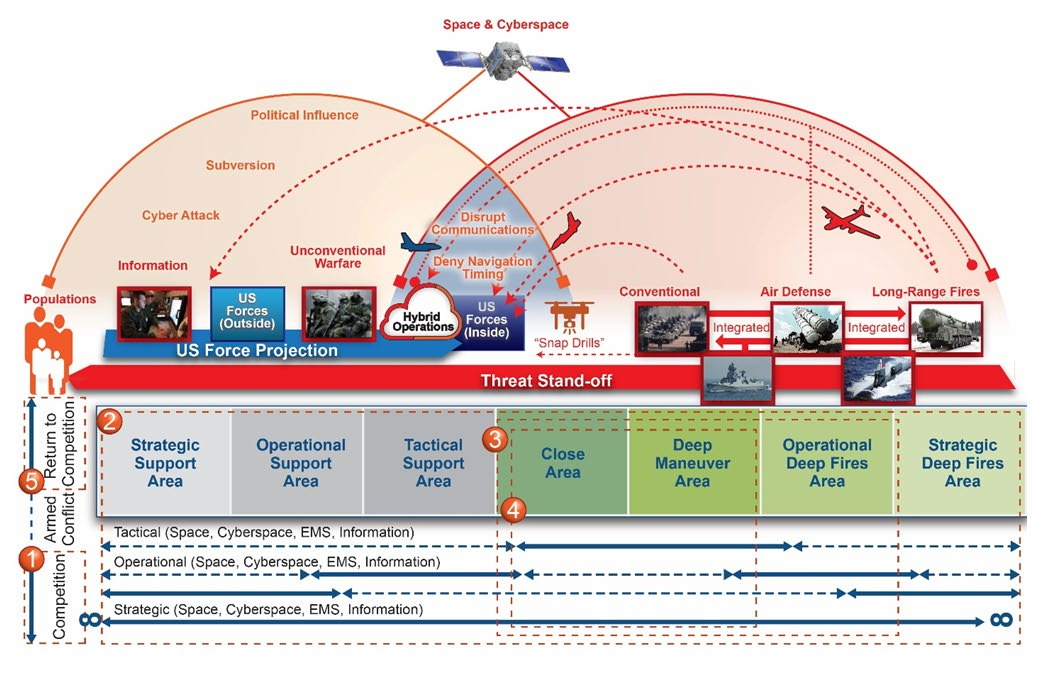
Multi-domain operations (MDO) span multiple domains: cislunar space, land, air, maritime, cyber, and populations.

According to AFC, the mission of the Long Range Precision Fires (LRPF) CFT is to "deliver cutting-edge surface-to-surface (SSM) fires systems that will significantly increase range and effects over currently fielded US and adversary systems."

AFC's five major programs for LRPF are:

- The Extended Range Cannon Artillery (ERCA) program which develops a system capable of firing accurately at targets beyond 70 km as opposed to the M109A7's 30 km current range (Note: In late FY2023 18 ERCA prototypes will undergo a one-year operational assessment at Fort Bliss.)
- The Precision Strike Missile (PrSM) which is a precision-strike guided SSM fired from the M270A1 MLRS and M142 HIMARS doubling the present rate-of-fire with two missiles per launch pod (Note: Munitions such as PrSM will need to fire and then move, at targets on the move.)
- The Strategic Long-Range Cannon (SLRC) program, which would have developed a system that could have fired a hypersonic projectile up to 1,000 miles (1,600 km) against air defense, artillery, missile systems, and command and control targets was terminated 23 May 2022.
- The Common-Hypersonic Glide Body (C-HGB) is a collaborative program between the Army, Navy, Air Force, and Missile Defense Agency (MDA) which is planned to become the base of the Long-Range Hypersonic Weapon (LRHW) program
- A ground-launchable BGM-109 Tomahawk, as well as the SM-6 to fill the gap in the Army's mid-range missile capabilities.

Based on Futures Command's development between July 2018 and December 2020, by 2023 the earliest versions of these weapons will be fielded:

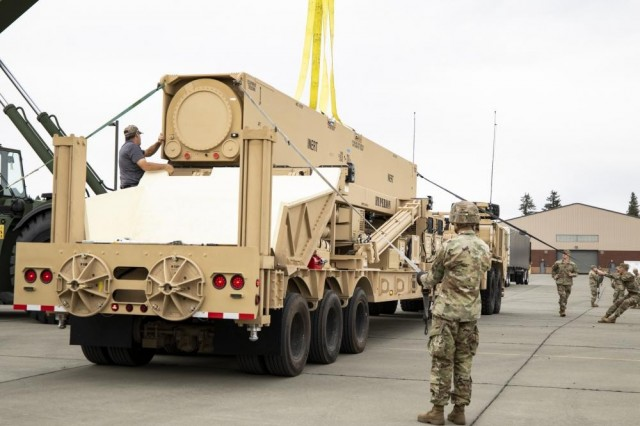
Long-Range Hypersonic Weapon training with all-up-round in its canister, 7 Oct 2021

The kill chains will take less than 1 minute, from detection of the target, to execution of the fires command; these operations will have the capability to precisely strike "command centers, air defenses, missile batteries, and logistics centers" nearly simultaneously. (Note: "[HIMARS] is used to destroy critical communications nodes, command posts, airfields, and important logistics facilities".—Mick Ryerson (Major General, Australian Army, retired))

- The speed of battle damage assessment will depend on the travel time of the munition. This capability depends on the ability of a specialized CFT, Assured precision navigation and timing (APNT) to provide detail.
  1. Long Range Precision Fires (LRPF): Howitzer artillery ranges have doubled, in excess of 60 km (37 mi), with accuracy within 1 meter of the aimpoint, currently with sufficient accuracy to intercept cruise missiles, as of September 2020, reaching the 43-mile (69 km) range as of December 2020.
  2. Precision Strike Missiles (PrSMs) can reach in excess of 150 miles (240 km), with current 2020 tests
  3. Mid-range capability (MRC) fires (Note: Mid-range capability (MRC) missile, was later renamed Strategic Mid-Range Fires (SMRF).) can reach in excess of 500 to 1,000 miles (800–1,610 km), using mature Navy missiles
  4. Long-Range Hypersonic Weapons (LRHWs) are to have a range greater than 1,725 miles (2,776 km).

The current M109A6 "Paladin" howitzer range is doubled in the M109A7 variant. An operational test of components of the Long range cannon was scheduled for 2020. The LRC is complementary to Extended range cannon artillery (ERCA), the M1299 Extended Range Cannon Artillery howitzer. Baseline ERCA is to enter service in 2023. Investigations for ERCA in 2025: rocket-boosted artillery shells: Tests of the Multiple launch rocket system (MLRS) XM30 rocket shell have demonstrated a near-doubling of the range of the munition, using the Tail controlled guided multiple launch rocket system, or TC-G. The TRADOC capability manager (TCM) Field Artillery Brigade - DIVARTY has been named a command position. (Note: "That's pretty important because that gives him (Dunwoody) the authority to do what needs to be done across the Army with the myriad responsibilities that he has," Shoffner said." Dunwoody becomes a direct report to the TRADOC commander —Tribune staff (22 August 2019) Colonel named division artillery director)

- An autoloader for ERCA's 95-pound shells is under development at Picatinny Arsenal, to support a sustained firing rate of 10 rounds a minute A robotic vehicle for carrying the shells is a separate effort at Futures Command's Army Applications Lab.
- The Precision Strike Missile (PrSM) is intended to replace the Army Tactical Missile System (MGM-140 ATACMS) in 2023. PrSM flight testing is delayed beyond 2 August 2019, the anticipated date for the expiration of the Intermediate-range Nuclear Forces Treaty, which set 499 kilometer limits on intermediate-range missiles. (David Sanger and Edward Wong projected that the earliest test of a longer range missile could be a ground-launched version of a Tomahawk cruise missile, followed by a test of a mobile ground launched IRBM with a range of 1,800–2,500 miles (2,900–4,000 km) before year-end 2019.) The 2020 National Defense Authorization Act (NDAA) was approved on 9 December 2019, which allowed the Pentagon to continue testing such missiles in FY2020. The Lockheed PrSM prototype had its first launch on 10 December 2019 at White Sands Missile Range, in a 150-mile (240 km) test, and an overhead detonation; the Raytheon PrSM prototype was delayed from its planned November launch, and Raytheon has now withdrawn from the PrSM risk reduction phase. The PrSM's range and accuracy, the interfaces to HIMARS launcher, and test software, met expectations. PrSM passed Milestone B on 1 October 2021. Baseline PrSM is to enter service in 2023; an upgraded version of PrSM, with multi-mode seekers will then be sought.
- For targets beyond the PrSM's range, the Army's RCCTO will seek a mid-range missile prototype by 2023, with a reach from 1,000 to 2,000 miles (1,600–3,200 km). Loren Thompson points out that a spectrum of medium-range to long-range weapons will be available to the service by 2023; RCCTO's prototype Mid-Range Capability (MRC) battery will field mature Navy missiles, likely for the Indo-Pacific theater in FY2023. DARPA is developing OpFires, an intermediate-range hypersonic weapon which is shorter-range than the Army's LRHW. DARPA is seeking a role in the armory for OpFires' throttle-able rocket motor, post-2023. DARPA announced in July 2022 it successfully tested its OpFires hypersonic weapon at White Sands Missile Range (WSMR) for the first time. The OpFires launch was from a Marine Corps logistics truck. OpFires will "rapidly and precisely engage critical, time-sensitive targets while penetrating modern enemy air defenses", potentially to be launched from a High Mobility Artillery Rocket System (HIMARS) launcher. These weapons will likely require planning for new Army (or Joint) formations.
- The Long range hypersonic weapons (LRHWs) will use precision targeting data against anti-access area denial (A2AD) radars and other critical infrastructure of near-peer competitors by 2023. LRHW does depend on stable funding.
  - Advanced Field Artillery Tactical Data System (AFATDS) 7.0 is the vehicle for a Multi-domain task force's artillery battery very similar to a THAAD battery: beginning in 2020, these batteries will train for a hypersonic glide vehicle which is common to the Joint forces. The Long range hypersonic weapon (LRHW) glide vehicle is to be launched from transporter erector launchers. Tests of the Common hypersonic glide body (C-HGB) to be used by the Army and Navy were meeting expectations in 2020.
  - In August 2020 the director of Assured precision navigation and timing (APNT) CFT announced tests which integrate the entire fires kill chain, from initial detection to final destruction. William B. Nelson announced the flow of satellite data from the European theater (Germany), and AI processing of AFATDS targeting data to the fires units.
    - In September 2020 an AI kill chain was formulated in seconds; a hypervelocity (speeds up to Mach 5) munition, launched from a descendant of the Paladin, intercepted a cruise missile surrogate.
  - Three flight tests of LRHW were scheduled in 2021; that plan was changed to one test in late 2021, followed by a multi-missile test in 2022.

The LRHW has been named 'Dark Eagle' The first LRHW battery will start to receive its first operational rounds in early FY2023; all eight rounds for this battery will have been delivered by FY2023. By then, the PEO Missiles and Space will have picked up the LRHW program, for batteries two and three in FY'25 and FY'27, respectively. Battery one will first train, and then participate in the LRHW flight test launches in FY'22 and FY'23.

== Organization ==
In 1789 after the Revolution there was only one battalion of four companies of artillery. In 1794 a "Corps of Artillerists and Engineers" was organized, which included the four companies of artillery then in service and had sixteen companies in four battalions. In 1802 there was a reduction of the army. The Artillery were separated from the Engineers and the former formed into one regiment of 20 companies. In 1808 a regiment of ten companies called the "Regiment of Light Artillery" was formed. In 1812 two more regiments were added.

In 1821 four regiments were created from existing units on the following lines.

- 1st Regiment of Artillery, 2 March 1821, listed by artillery battery:
  - A
  - B
  - C
  - D
  - E
  - F
  - G
  - H
  - I
  - K- added 1832
  - L- added 1847
  - M- added 1847
  - N- added 1899
  - O- added 1899
- 2nd Regiment of Artillery, 2 March 1821
  - Battery A, 2nd U.S. Artillery
- 3rd Regiment of Artillery, 2 March 1821
- 4th Regiment of Artillery, 2 March 1821
  - 4th U.S. Artillery, Battery H
  - 4th U.S. Artillery, Battery I
  - 4th U.S. Artillery, Battery M
- 5th Regiment of Artillery, 4 May 1861
  - 5th U.S. Artillery, Battery H
- 6th Regiment of Artillery, 8 March 1898
- 7th Regiment of Artillery, 8 March 1898
- (98 Batteries)

In 1901 the regimental organization of the US Army artillery was abolished, more companies were added, and given numerical designations.

- 126 companies of heavy (coast) artillery
- 30 companies of light (field) artillery

In 1907 the Coast Artillery Corps was established as a separate branch, and the Field Artillery re-established regiments officially, although provisional regiments had existed since 1905.

- 1st Field Artillery Regiment
  - With 2 battalions each with 3 batteries
- 2nd Field Artillery Regiment
- 3rd Field Artillery Regiment
- 4th Field Artillery Regiment
- 5th Field Artillery Regiment
- 6th Field Artillery Regiment

In 1916 Congress enacted the National Defense Act and 15 more regiments were authorized.

- 7th Field Artillery Regiment
- 8th Field Artillery Regiment
- 9th Field Artillery Regiment
- 10th Field Artillery Regiment
- 11th Field Artillery Regiment
- 12th Field Artillery Regiment
- 13th Field Artillery Regiment
- 14th Field Artillery Regiment
- 15th Field Artillery Regiment
- 16th Field Artillery Regiment
- 17th Field Artillery Regiment
- 18th Field Artillery Regiment
- 19th Field Artillery Regiment
- 20th Field Artillery Regiment
- 21st Field Artillery Regiment

In 1917, following the American entry into World War I, regimental numbers from 1-100 were reserved for the Regular Army, from 101-300 for the National Guard, and 301 and above for the National Army. Under this system, the 1st-21st and 76th-83rd Field Artillery Regiments were organized in the Regular Army, the 101st-151st Regiments in the National Guard, and the 25th-75th, 84th, 85th, and 301st-351st in the National Army. Field artillery brigades, numbered 1st-24th, 51st-67th, and 151st-172nd, were also organized, with each brigade typically commanding three regiments; each division had one of these artillery brigades.

A 1918 expansion added the 22d Field Artillery Regiment through the 39th Field Artillery Regiment with some exceptions, notably Philippine Scouts units.

The Coast Artillery Corps constantly reorganized the numbered companies until 1924, but during World War I created 61 artillery regiments from the numbered companies, for service (or potential service) with the American Expeditionary Forces (AEF); the 30th through 45th Artillery Brigades were also created to command groups of these regiments. These regiments operated almost all US-manned heavy and railway artillery on the Western Front, and were designated, for example, 51st Artillery (Coast Artillery Corps (CAC)). Most of these were disbanded immediately after the war. The Coast Artillery also acquired the antiaircraft mission during the war, which was formalized a few years later. In 1924 the Coast Artillery Corps adopted a regimental system, and numbered companies were returned to letter designations. (In order to promote esprit-de-corps, the first 7 regiments were linked to the original 7 regiments of artillery). During 1943 most antiaircraft units lost their Coast Artillery designations, and the regiments were broken up into battalions. However, the antiaircraft branch remained nominally part of the Coast Artillery Corps. In late 1944 the Coast Artillery harbor defense regiments were inactivated or reorganized as battalions, which themselves were mostly disbanded in April 1945, with personnel transferred to the local Harbor Defense Commands. 977 Coast Artillery and antiaircraft battalions were created before the branch's demise in 1950.

In 1943 an Army reorganization eliminated the regimental structure in all branches except infantry and created numerous serially numbered field artillery battalions by breaking up the existing regiments. Also during World War II, new designations were applied to some units, the "Armored Field Artillery Battalion" for self-propelled units and the "Parachute (or Glider) Field Artillery Battalion" for airborne units. "Field Artillery Groups" were also created during the war as an alternative to the regimental concept.

The Army Anti-Aircraft Command (ARAACOM) was created in July 1950, and renamed to become US Army Air Defense Command (USARADCOM) in 1957. A new system, the U.S. Army Combat Arms Regimental System (CARS), was adopted in 1957 to replace the old regimental system. CARS used the Army's traditional regiments as parent organizations for historical purposes, but the primary building blocks are divisions, and brigades became battalions. Each battalion carries an association with a parent regiment, even though the regimental organization no longer exists. In some brigades several numbered battalions carrying the same regimental association may still serve together, and tend to consider themselves part of the traditional regiment when in fact they are independent battalions serving a brigade, rather than a regimental, headquarters. From c. 1959 through 1971 antiaircraft units and field artillery units were combined with common parent regiments for lineage purposes, for example the "1st Artillery".

In 1968 the Air Defense Artillery Branch (United States Army) was split from the artillery, with the Regular Army air defense and field artillery regiments separating on 1 September 1971.

The CARS was replaced by the U.S. Army Regimental System (USARS) in 1981. US Artillery Structure 1989. On 1 October 2005, the word "regiment" was formally appended to the name of all active and inactive CARS and USARS regiments. So, for example, the 1st Cavalry officially became titled the 1st Cavalry Regiment.

During the Cold War the Field Artillery was responsible for all mobile ballistic missile weapons systems, including the Lance and Pershing II ballistic missiles.

== List of prominent Redlegs ==
The nickname Redlegs refers to soldiers and former soldiers in the US Army Artillery. The nickname hearkens back to when artillerymen wore distinctive red stripes on their uniform trousers.

- Ken Berry, Actor, Dancer, and Comedian, started his army service in Artillery, until winning a talent contest and transferring into special services.
- Matt Bevin, 62nd governor of Kentucky
- Tommy Franks, 7th Commander of United States Central Command (2000–2003)
- Berry Gordy, founder of Motown Record Corp.
- Alexander Hamilton, Founding Father of the United States and first Secretary of the Treasury.
- Edwin Meese, 75th United States Attorney General
- Jack N. Merritt, U.S. Military Representative to NATO, 1985–1987, National Security Council
- Raymond T. Odierno, 38th Chief of Staff of the United States Army
- Roy Earl Parrish, West Virginia state senator (1915–1918)
- J.H. Binford Peay III, 24th Vice Chief of Staff of the Army, 5th Commander of United States Central Command, and 14th Superintendent of the Virginia Military Institute
- Charles Rangel, Member of U.S. House of Representatives (1971–2017)
- Joe R. Reeder, Undersecretary of the Army, 1993–1997
- Dennis J. Reimer, 33rd Chief of Staff of the United States Army
- Samuel Ringgold, hero of the Battle of Palo Alto
- James N. Robertson, Member of the Pennsylvania House of Representatives (1949–1952), Brigadier general in the Pennsylvania National Guard
- Randolph Scott, film actor and 2nd Lieutenant of Artillery, 1917–1919
- John Shalikashvili, Supreme Allied Commander Europe, 1992–1993, 13th Chairman of the Joint Chiefs of Staff
- Maxwell D. Taylor, 20th Chief of Staff of the United States Army, 5th Chairman of the Joint Chiefs of Staff, and Ambassador to South Vietnam
- George H. Thomas, major general in the Civil War and famous as the "Rock of Chickamauga"
- Harry S. Truman, 33rd president of the United States
- John William Vessey Jr, 10th Chairman of the Joint Chiefs of Staff
- Carl E. Vuono, 31st Chief of Staff of the United States Army
- Allen West, retired U.S. Army lieutenant colonel and member of U.S. House of Representatives (2011–2013)
- William Westmoreland, 25th Chief of Staff of the United States Army and 2nd Commander of Military Assistance Command, Vietnam

== See also ==
- Field artillery in the American Civil War
- List of artillery
- List of field artillery regiments of the United States
- List of United States War Department Forms – lists US Army ordnance publications c. 1895–1920, links online versions, including many field artillery weapons
- Siege artillery in the American Civil War
- United States Army branch insignia
- US Field artillery team
- U.S. Horse Artillery Brigade
