= Battle of Cold Harbor order of battle: Union =

The following Union Army units and commanders fought in the Battle of Cold Harbor (May 31–June 12, 1864) of the American Civil War. The Confederate order of battle is listed separately. Order of battle compiled from the army organization May 31, 1864, army organization May 26-June 3, 1864, the casualty returns and the reports.

== Abbreviations used ==
=== Military Rank ===
- LTG = Lieutenant General
- MG = Major General
- BG = Brigadier General
- Col = Colonel
- Ltc = Lieutenant Colonel
- Maj = Major
- Cpt = Captain

=== Other ===
- w = wounded
- mw = mortally wounded
- k = killed in action
- c = captured

== Forces operating against Richmond May 31-June 5, 1864 ==
LTG Ulysses S. Grant

Escort:

- 5th United States Cavalry, Companies B, F and K

=== Army of the Potomac ===
MG George Meade

General Staff:

- Chief of Staff: MG Andrew A. Humphreys
- Assistant Adjutant General: BG Seth Williams
- Chief Quartermaster: BG Rufus Ingalls

General Headquarters:

Provost Guard: BG Marsena R. Patrick

- 1st Massachusetts Cavalry, Companies C and D
- 80th New York (20th Militia)
- 3rd Pennsylvania Cavalry
- 68th Pennsylvania
- 114th Pennsylvania

Engineer Troops:

- 50th New York Engineers
- Battalion United States Engineers

Guards and Orderlies:

- Independent Company Oneida (New York) Cavalry

Unattached:

- 22nd New York Cavalry

==== II Corps ====
MG Winfield S. Hancock

Escort:

- 1st Vermont Cavalry, Company M

Division	Brigade	Regiments and Others
First Division BG Francis C. Barlow	1st Brigade Col Nelson A. Miles	26th Michigan; 5th New Hampshire; 2nd New York Heavy Artillery; 61st New York; 81st Pennsylvania; 140th Pennsylvania; 183rd Pennsylvania
First Division BG Francis C. Barlow	2nd Brigade Col Richard Byrnes (mw); Col Patrick Kelly	28th Massachusetts; 63rd New York; 69th New York; 88th New York: Col Patrick Kelly; 116th Pennsylvania
First Division BG Francis C. Barlow	3rd Brigade Col Clinton D. MacDougall	39th New York; 52nd New York; 57th New York; 111th New York; 125th New York; 126th New York
First Division BG Francis C. Barlow	4th Brigade Col John R. Brooke (w); Col Orlando H. Morris (k); Col Lewis O. Morris (k); Col James A. Beaver	2nd Delaware; 7th New York Heavy Artillery: Col Lewis O. Morris; 64th New York; 66th New York: Col Orlando H. Morris; 53rd Pennsylvania; 145th Pennsylvania; 148th Pennsylvania: Col James A. Beaver
Second Division BG John Gibbon	1st Brigade Col H. Boyd McKeen (k); Col Frank A. Haskell (k); BG Byron R. Pierce	19th Maine; 15th Massachusetts; 19th Massachusetts; 20th Massachusetts; 1st Company Massachusetts Sharpshooters; 7th Michigan; 42nd New York; 59th New York; 82nd New York (battalion); 184th Pennsylvania; 36th Wisconsin: Col Frank A. Haskell
Second Division BG John Gibbon	2nd Brigade BG Joshua T. Owen	152nd New York; 69th Pennsylvania; 71st Pennsylvania; 72nd Pennsylvania; 106th Pennsylvania
Second Division BG John Gibbon	3rd Brigade Col Thomas A. Smyth	14th Connecticut; 1st Delaware; 14th Indiana; 12th New Jersey; 10th New York Battalion; 108th New York; 4th Ohio; 8th Ohio; 7th West Virginia
Second Division BG John Gibbon	4th Brigade BG Robert O. Tyler (w); Col James P. McIvor	8th New York Heavy Artillery; 155th New York; 164th New York; 170th New York: Col James P. McIvor; 182nd New York
Second Division BG John Gibbon	Provost Guard	2nd Company Minnesota Sharpshooters
Third Division MG David B. Birney	1st Brigade Col Thomas W. Egan	20th Indiana; 3rd Maine; 40th New York; 86th New York; 124th New York; 99th Pennsylvania; 110th Pennsylvania; 141st Pennsylvania; 2nd United States Sharpshooters
Third Division MG David B. Birney	2nd Brigade Col Thomas R. Tannatt	4th Maine; 17th Maine; 1st Massachusetts Heavy Artillery; 3rd Michigan; 5th Michigan; 93rd New York; 57th Pennsylvania; 63rd Pennsylvania; 105th Pennsylvania; 1st United States Sharpshooters
Third Division MG David B. Birney	3rd Brigade BG Gershom Mott	1st Maine Heavy Artillery; 16th Massachusetts; 5th New Jersey; 6th New Jersey; 7th New Jersey; 8th New Jersey; 11th New Jersey; 115th Pennsylvania
Third Division MG David B. Birney	4th Brigade Col William R. Brewster	11th Massachusetts; 70th New York; 71st New York; 72nd New York (3 Companies); 73rd New York; 74th New York; 120th New York; 84th Pennsylvania
	Artillery Brigade Col John C. Tidball	Maine Light, 6th Battery (F); Massachusetts Light, 10th Battery; New Hampshire Light, 1st Battery; 1st New Jersey Light, Battery B; 1st New York Light, Battery G; 4th New York Heavy; New York Light, 11th Battery; New York Light, 12th Battery; 1st Pennsylvania Light, Battery F; 1st Rhode Island Light, Battery A; 1st Rhode Island Light, Battery B; 4th United States, Battery K; 5th United States, Batteries C and I

==== V Corps ====
MG Gouverneur K. Warren

Provost Guard:

- 12th New York Battalion

Division	Brigade	Regiments and Others
First Division BG Charles Griffin	1st Brigade BG Romeyn B. Ayres	5th New York; 140th New York; 146th New York; 91st Pennsylvania; 155th Pennsylvania; 2nd United States, Companies B, C, F, H, I, and K; 11th United States, Companies B, C, D, E, F, and G, 1st Battalion; 12th United States, Companies A, B, C, D, and G, 1st Battalion, and Companies A, C, D, F, and H, 2nd Battalion; 14th United States, 1st Battalion; 17th United States, Companies A, C, D, G, and H, 1st Battalion, and Companies A, B, and C, 2nd Battalion
First Division BG Charles Griffin	2nd Brigade Col Jacob B. Sweitzer	9th Massachusetts; 22nd Massachusetts; 32nd Massachusetts; 4th Michigan; 62nd Pennsylvania; 21st Pennsylvania Cavalry (Dismounted)
First Division BG Charles Griffin	3rd Brigade BG Joseph J. Bartlett	20th Maine; 18th Massachusetts; 29th Massachusetts; 1st Michigan; 16th Michigan; 44th New York; 83rd Pennsylvania; 118th Pennsylvania
Second Division BG Henry H. Lockwood; BG Samuel W. Crawford	1st Brigade Col Peter Lyle	16th Maine; 13th Massachusetts; 39th Massachusetts; 94th New York; 104th New York; 90th Pennsylvania; 107th Pennsylvania
Second Division BG Henry H. Lockwood; BG Samuel W. Crawford	2nd Brigade Col James L. Bates	12th Massachusetts; 83rd New York; 97th New York; 11th Pennsylvania; 88th Pennsylvania
Second Division BG Henry H. Lockwood; BG Samuel W. Crawford	3rd Brigade Col Nathan D. Dushane	1st Maryland; 4th Maryland; 7th Maryland; 8th Maryland; Purnell (Maryland) Legion
Third Division BG Samuel W. Crawford	1st Brigade Col Martin Davis Hardin	1st Pennsylvania Reserves; 2nd Pennsylvania Reserves; 6th Pennsylvania Reserves; 7th Pennsylvania Reserves; 13th Pennsylvania Reserves
Third Division BG Samuel W. Crawford	3rd Brigade Col Joseph W. Fisher	5th Pennsylvania Reserves; 10th Pennsylvania Reserves; 12th Pennsylvania Reserves
Third Division BG Samuel W. Crawford	Heavy Artillery Brigade Col J. Howard Kitching	6th New York Heavy Artillery; 15th New York Heavy Artillery, 1st and 3rd Battalions
Fourth Division; BG Lysander Cutler	1st Brigade Col William W. Robinson	7th Indiana; 19th Indiana; 24th Michigan: Ltc William Wight, Maj Albert M. Edwards; 1st Battalion New York Sharpshooters; 6th Wisconsin; 7th Wisconsin
Fourth Division; BG Lysander Cutler	2nd Brigade Col William Hofmann	3rd Delaware; 4th Delaware; 46th New York; 76th New York; 95th New York; 147th New York; 56th Pennsylvania; 157th Pennsylvania
Fourth Division; BG Lysander Cutler	3rd Brigade Col Edward S. Bragg	121st Pennsylvania; 142nd Pennsylvania; 143rd Pennsylvania; 149th Pennsylvania; 150th Pennsylvania
Fourth Division; BG Lysander Cutler	Provost Guard	2nd Wisconsin
	Artillery Brigade Col Charles S. Wainwright	Massachusetts Light, 3rd Battery; Massachusetts Light, 5th Battery; Massachusetts Light, 9th Battery; 1st New York Light, Battery B; 1st New York Light, Battery C; 1st New York Light, Battery D; 1st New York Light, Batteries E and L; 1st New York Light, Battery H; New York Light, 15th Battery; 1st Pennsylvania Light, Battery B; 4th United States, Battery B; 5th United States, Battery D

==== VI Corps ====
MG Horatio G. Wright

Escort:

- 8th Pennsylvania Cavalry, Company A

Division	Brigade	Regiments and Others
First Division BG David A. Russell	1st Brigade Col William H. Penrose	1st New Jersey; 3rd New Jersey; 4th New Jersey; 10th New Jersey; 15th New Jersey
First Division BG David A. Russell	2nd Brigade BG Emory Upton	2nd Connecticut Heavy Artillery; 5th Maine; 121st New York; 95th Pennsylvania; 96th Pennsylvania
First Division BG David A. Russell	3rd Brigade BG Henry L. Eustis	6th Maine; 49th Pennsylvania; 119th Pennsylvania; 5th Wisconsin
First Division BG David A. Russell	4th Brigade Col Nelson Cross	65th New York; 67th New York; 122nd New York; 23rd Pennsylvania; 82nd Pennsylvania
Second Division BG Thomas H. Neill	1st Brigade BG Frank Wheaton	62nd New York; 93rd Pennsylvania; 98th Pennsylvania; 102nd Pennsylvania; 139th Pennsylvania
Second Division BG Thomas H. Neill	2nd Brigade BG Lewis A. Grant	1st Vermont Heavy Artillery; 2nd Vermont; 3rd Vermont; 4th Vermont; 5th Vermont; 6th Vermont
Second Division BG Thomas H. Neill	3rd Brigade Col Daniel D. Bidwell	7th Maine; 43rd New York; 49th New York; 77th New York; 61st Pennsylvania
Second Division BG Thomas H. Neill	4th Brigade Col Oliver Edwards	7th Massachusetts; 10th Massachusetts; 37th Massachusetts; 2nd Rhode Island
Third Division BG James B. Ricketts	1st Brigade Col William S. Truex (w); Ltc Caldwell K. Hall; Col John W. Schall (w); Ltc Caldwell K. Hall	14th New Jersey: Ltc Caldwell K. Hall; 106th New York; 151st New York; 87th Pennsylvania; 10th Vermont
Third Division BG James B. Ricketts	2nd Brigade Col Benjamin F. Smith	6th Maryland; 9th New York Heavy Artillery, 1st and 3rd Battalions; 110th Ohio; 122nd Ohio; 126th Ohio; 67th Pennsylvania; 138th Pennsylvania
	Artillery Brigade Col Charles H. Tompkins	Maine Light, 4th Battery (D); Maine Light, 5th Battery (E); Massachusetts Light, 1st Battery (A); 1st New Jersey Light, Battery A; New York Light, 1st Battery; New York Light, 3rd Battery; 9th New York Heavy, 2nd Battalion; 1st Ohio Light, Battery H; 1st Rhode Island Light, Battery C; 1st Rhode Island Light, Battery E; 1st Rhode Island Light, Battery G; 5th United States, Battery E; 5th United States, Battery M

==== IX Corps ====
MG Ambrose E. Burnside

General Staff:

- Chief of Staff: MG John G. Parke
- Chief of Artillery: Ltc J. Albert Monroe

Provost Guard:

- 8th United States

Division	Brigade	Regiments and Others
First Division MG Thomas L. Crittenden	1st Brigade BG James H. Ledlie	56th Massachusetts; 57th Massachusetts; 59th Massachusetts; 4th United States; 10th United States
First Division MG Thomas L. Crittenden	2nd Brigade Ltc Gilbert P. Robinson; Col Joseph M. Sudsburg; Col Ebenezer W. Peirce	3rd Maryland; 21st Massachusetts; 100th Pennsylvania
First Division MG Thomas L. Crittenden	Provisional Brigade Col Elisha G. Marshall	2nd New York Mounted Rifles (dismounted); 14th New York Heavy Artillery; 24th New York Cavalry (dismounted); 2nd Pennsylvania Provisional Heavy Artillery
First Division MG Thomas L. Crittenden	Acting Engineers	35th Massachusetts
First Division MG Thomas L. Crittenden	Artillery	Maine Light, 2nd Battery (B); Massachusetts Light, 14th Battery
Second Division BG Robert B. Potter	1st Brigade Col John I. Curtin	36th Massachusetts; 58th Massachusetts; 45th Pennsylvania; 48th Pennsylvania; 7th Rhode Island
Second Division BG Robert B. Potter	2nd Brigade Col Simon G. Griffin	2nd Maryland (detachment); 31st Maine; 32nd Maine; 6th New Hampshire; 9th New Hampshire; 11th New Hampshire; 17th Vermont
Second Division BG Robert B. Potter	Acting Engineers	51st New York
Second Division BG Robert B. Potter	Artillery	Massachusetts Light, 11th Battery; New York Light, 19th Battery
Third Division BG Orlando B. Willcox	1st Brigade Col John F. Hartranft	2nd Michigan; 8th Michigan; 27th Michigan; 109th New York; 51st Pennsylvania
Third Division BG Orlando B. Willcox	2nd Brigade Col Benjamin C. Christ	1st Michigan Sharpshooters; 20th Michigan; 60th Ohio; 50th Pennsylvania
Third Division BG Orlando B. Willcox	Acting Engineers	17th Michigan
Third Division BG Orlando B. Willcox	Artillery	Maine Light, 7th Battery (G); New York Light, 34th Battery
Fourth Division BG Edward Ferrero	1st Brigade Col Joshua K. Sigfried	27th United States Colored Troops; 30th United States Colored Troops; 39th United States Colored Troops; 43rd United States Colored Troops
Fourth Division BG Edward Ferrero	2nd Brigade Col Henry G. Thomas	19th United States Colored Troops; 23rd United States Colored Troops; 31st United States Colored Troops
Fourth Division BG Edward Ferrero	Artillery	Pennsylvania Light, Battery D; Vermont Light, 3rd Battery

==== Cavalry Corps ====
MG Philip H. Sheridan

Escort:

- 6th United States

Division	Brigade	Regiments and Others
First Division; BG Alfred T. A. Torbert	1st Brigade BG George A. Custer	1st Michigan; 5th Michigan; 6th Michigan; 7th Michigan
First Division; BG Alfred T. A. Torbert	2nd Brigade Col Thomas C. Devin	4th New York; 6th New York; 9th New York; 17th Pennsylvania
First Division; BG Alfred T. A. Torbert	Reserve Brigade BG Wesley Merritt	19th New York (1st Dragoons); 6th Pennsylvania; 1st United States; 2nd United States; 5th United States
Second Division; BG David McM. Gregg	1st Brigade BG Henry E. Davies, Jr.	1st Massachusetts; 1st New Jersey; 10th New York; 6th Ohio; 1st Pennsylvania
Second Division; BG David McM. Gregg	2nd Brigade Col J. Irvin Gregg	1st Maine; 2nd Pennsylvania; 4th Pennsylvania; 8th Pennsylvania; 13th Pennsylvania; 16th Pennsylvania
Third Division; BG James H. Wilson	1st Brigade Col John B. McIntosh	1st Connecticut; 3rd New Jersey; 2nd New York; 5th New York; 2nd Ohio; 18th Pennsylvania
Third Division; BG James H. Wilson	2nd Brigade Col George H. Chapman	3rd Indiana; 8th New York; 1st Vermont
Third Division; BG James H. Wilson	Escort	8th Illinois (detachment)
	1st Brigade Horse Artillery Cpt James M. Robertson	New York Light, 6th Battery; 2nd United States, Batteries B and L; 2nd United States, Battery D; 2nd United States, Battery M; 4th United States, Battery A; 4th United States, Batteries C and E

==== Artillery ====
Division	Brigade	Regiments and Others
Artillery; BG Henry J. Hunt	2nd Brigade Horse Artillery Cpt Dunbar R. Ransom	1st United States, Batteries E and G; 1st United States, Batteries H and I; 1st United States, Battery K; 2nd United States, Battery A; 2nd United States, Battery G; 3rd United States, Batteries C, F, and K
Artillery; BG Henry J. Hunt	Artillery Park Ltc Freeman McGilvery	15th New York Heavy, 2nd Battalion

=== Army of the James ===
==== XVIII Corps ====
MG William F. Smith

Division	Brigade	Regiments and Others
First Division BG William T. H. Brooks	1st Brigade BG Gilman Marston	81st New York; 96th New York; 98th New York; 139th New York
First Division BG William T. H. Brooks	2nd Brigade BG Hiram Burnham	8th Connecticut; 10th New Hampshire; 13th New Hampshire; 118th New York
First Division BG William T. H. Brooks	3rd Brigade Col Guy V. Henry	21st Connecticut; 40th Massachusetts; 92nd New York; 58th Pennsylvania; 188th Pennsylvania
Second Division BG John H. Martindale	1st Brigade BG George J. Stannard	23rd Massachusetts; 25th Massachusetts; 27th Massachusetts; 9th New Jersey; 89th New York; 55th Pennsylvania
Second Division BG John H. Martindale	2nd Brigade Col Griffin Alexander Stedman	11th Connecticut; 8th Maine; 2nd New Hampshire; 12th New Hampshire; 148th New York
Third Division BG Charles Devens, Jr. BG Adelbert Ames	1st Brigade Col William B. Barton	47th New York; 48th New York; 115th New York; 76th Pennsylvania
Third Division BG Charles Devens, Jr. BG Adelbert Ames	2nd Brigade Col Jeremiah C. Drake (mw); Ltc Zina H. Robinson; Col Alexander Piper	13th Indiana; 9th Maine: Ltc Zina H. Robinson; 112th New York; 169th New York; 10th New York Heavy Artillery
Third Division BG Charles Devens, Jr. BG Adelbert Ames	3rd Brigade BG Adelbert Ames; Col Henry R. Guss	4th New Hampshire; 3rd New York; 117th New York; 142nd New York; 97th Pennsylvania: Col Henry R. Guss
	Artillery Brigade Cpt Samuel S. Elder	1st United States, Battery B; 4th United States, Battery L; 5th United States, Battery A

== Forces operating against Richmond June 6-12, 1864 ==
LTG Ulysses S. Grant

Escort:

- 5th United States Cavalry, Companies B, F and K

=== Army of the Potomac ===
MG George Meade

General Staff:

- Chief of Staff: MG Andrew A. Humphreys
- Assistant Adjutant General: BG Seth Williams
- Chief Quartermaster: BG Rufus Ingalls

General Headquarters:

Provost Guard: BG Marsena R. Patrick

- 1st Massachusetts Cavalry, Companies C and D
- 80th New York (20th Militia)
- 3rd Pennsylvania Cavalry
- 68th Pennsylvania
- 114th Pennsylvania

Engineer Troops:

- 50th New York Engineers
- Battalion United States Engineers

Guards and Orderlies:

- Independent Company Oneida (New York) Cavalry

==== II Corps ====
MG Winfield S. Hancock

Escort:

- 1st Vermont Cavalry, Company M

Division	Brigade	Regiments and Others
First Division BG Francis C. Barlow	1st Brigade Col Nelson A. Miles	26th Michigan; 5th New Hampshire; 2nd New York Heavy Artillery; 61st New York; 81st Pennsylvania; 140th Pennsylvania; 183rd Pennsylvania
First Division BG Francis C. Barlow	2nd Brigade Col Patrick Kelly	28th Massachusetts; 63rd New York; 69th New York; 88th New York; 116th Pennsylvania
First Division BG Francis C. Barlow	3rd Brigade Col Clinton D. MacDougall	39th New York; 52nd New York; 57th New York; 111th New York; 125th New York; 126th New York
First Division BG Francis C. Barlow	4th Brigade Col James A. Beaver	2nd Delaware; 7th New York Heavy Artillery; 64th New York; 66th New York; 53rd Pennsylvania; 145th Pennsylvania; 148th Pennsylvania
Second Division BG John Gibbon	1st Brigade BG Byron R. Pierce	19th Maine; 1st Company Massachusetts Sharpshooters; 15th Massachusetts; 19th Massachusetts; 20th Massachusetts; 7th Michigan; 42nd New York; 59th New York; 82nd New York (Battalion); 184th Pennsylvania; 36th Wisconsin
Second Division BG John Gibbon	2nd Brigade BG Joshua T. Owen; Col John Fraser	152nd New York; 69th Pennsylvania; 71st Pennsylvania; 72nd Pennsylvania; 106th Pennsylvania
Second Division BG John Gibbon	3rd Brigade Col Thomas A. Smyth	14th Connecticut; 1st Delaware; 14th Indiana; 12th New Jersey; 10th New York Battalion; 108th New York; 4th Ohio; 8th Ohio; 7th West Virginia
Second Division BG John Gibbon	4th Brigade Col James P. MacIvor; Col John Ramsey	8th New York Heavy Artillery; 155th New York; 164th New York; 170th New York; 182nd New York
Second Division BG John Gibbon	Provost Guard	2nd Company Minnesota Sharpshooters
Third Division MG David B. Birney	1st Brigade Col Thomas W. Egan	20th Indiana; 3rd Maine; 17th Maine; 40th New York; 86th New York; 124th New York; 99th Pennsylvania; 110th Pennsylvania; 141st Pennsylvania; 2nd United States Sharpshooters
Third Division MG David B. Birney	2nd Brigade Col Thomas R. Tannatt	4th Maine; 1st Massachusetts Heavy Artillery; 3rd Michigan; 5th Michigan; 93rd New York; 57th Pennsylvania; 63rd Pennsylvania; 105th Pennsylvania; 1st United States Sharpshooters
Third Division MG David B. Birney	3rd Brigade BG Gershom Mott	1st Maine Heavy Artillery; 16th Massachusetts; 5th New Jersey; 6th New Jersey; 7th New Jersey; 8th New Jersey; 11th New Jersey; 115th Pennsylvania
Third Division MG David B. Birney	4th Brigade Col William R. Brewster	11th Massachusetts; 70th New York; 71st New York; 72nd New York (3 Companies); 73rd New York; 74th New York; 120th New York; 84th Pennsylvania
	Artillery Brigade Col John C. Tidball	Maine Light, 6th Battery (F); Massachusetts Light, 10th Battery; New Hampshire Light, 1st Battery; 1st New Jersey Light, Battery B; 1st New York Light, Battery G; 4th New York Heavy; New York Light, 11th Battery; New York Light, 12th Battery; 1st Pennsylvania Light, Battery F; 1st Rhode Island Light, Battery A; 1st Rhode Island Light, Battery B; 4th United States, Battery K; 5th United States, Batteries C and I

==== V Corps ====
MG Gouverneur K. Warren

Provost Guard:

- 5th New York, Companies F and E

Division	Brigade	Regiments and Others
First Division BG Charles Griffin	1st Brigade Col Edward S. Bragg; Col Joshua L. Chamberlain	121st Pennsylvania; 142nd Pennsylvania; 143rd Pennsylvania; 149th Pennsylvania; 150th Pennsylvania; 187th Pennsylvania
First Division BG Charles Griffin	2nd Brigade Col Jacob B. Sweitzer	9th Massachusetts; 22nd Massachusetts; 32nd Massachusetts; 4th Michigan; 62nd Pennsylvania; 21st Pennsylvania Cavalry (Dismounted)
First Division BG Charles Griffin	3rd Brigade BG Joseph J. Bartlett	20th Maine; 18th Massachusetts; 1st Michigan; 16th Michigan; 44th New York; 83rd Pennsylvania; 118th Pennsylvania
Second Division BG Romeyn B. Ayres	1st Brigade Col Edgar M. Gregory	5th New York; 140th New York; 146th New York; 91st Pennsylvania; 155th Pennsylvania; 2nd United States, Companies B, C, F, H, I, and K; 11th United States, Companies B, C, D, E, F, and G, 1st Battalion; 12th United States, Companies A, B, C, D, and G, 1st Battalion, and Companies A, C, D, F, and H, 2nd Battalion; 14th United States, 1st Battalion; 17th United States, Companies A, C, D, G, and H, 1st Battalion, and Companies A, B, and C, 2nd Battalion
Second Division BG Romeyn B. Ayres	2nd Brigade Col Nathan D. Dushane	1st Maryland; 4th Maryland; 7th Maryland; 8th Maryland; Purnell (Maryland) Legion
Second Division BG Romeyn B. Ayres	3rd Brigade Col J. Howard Kitching	6th New York Heavy Artillery; 15th New York Heavy Artillery, 1st and 3rd Battalions
Third Division BG Samuel W. Crawford	1st Brigade Col Peter Lyle	16th Maine; 13th Massachusetts; 39th Massachusetts; 94th New York; 104th New York; 90th Pennsylvania; 107th Pennsylvania
Third Division BG Samuel W. Crawford	2nd Brigade Col James L. Bates	12th Massachusetts; 83rd New York; 97th New York; 11th Pennsylvania; 88th Pennsylvania
Third Division BG Samuel W. Crawford	3rd Brigade Maj William R. Hartshorne; Col James Carle	190th Pennsylvania; 191st Pennsylvania
Fourth Division; BG Lysander Cutler	1st Brigade Col William W. Robinson; Col Edward S. Bragg	7th Indiana; 19th Indiana; 24th Michigan: Maj Albert M. Edwards; 1st Battalion New York Sharpshooters; 6th Wisconsin; 7th Wisconsin
Fourth Division; BG Lysander Cutler	2nd Brigade Col William Hofmann	3rd Delaware; 4th Delaware; 76th New York; 95th New York; 147th New York; 56th Pennsylvania; 157th Pennsylvania
Fourth Division; BG Lysander Cutler	Provost Guard	2nd Wisconsin
	Artillery Brigade Col Charles S. Wainwright	Massachusetts Light, 3rd Battery; Massachusetts Light, 5th Battery; Massachusetts Light, 9th Battery; 1st New York Light, Battery B; 1st New York Light, Battery C; 1st New York Light, Battery D; 1st New York Light, Batteries E and L; 1st New York Light, Battery H; New York Light, 15th Battery; 1st Pennsylvania Light, Battery B; 4th United States, Battery B; 5th United States, Battery D

==== VI Corps ====
MG Horatio G. Wright

Escort:

- 8th Pennsylvania Cavalry, Company A

Division	Brigade	Regiments and Others
First Division BG David A. Russell	1st Brigade Col William H. Penrose	1st Delaware Cavalry (dismounted); 4th New Jersey; 10th New Jersey; 15th New Jersey
First Division BG David A. Russell	2nd Brigade BG Emory Upton	2nd Connecticut Heavy Artillery; 5th Maine; 121st New York; 95th Pennsylvania; 96th Pennsylvania
First Division BG David A. Russell	3rd Brigade BG Henry L. Eustis; Ltc Gideon Clark	6th Maine; 49th Pennsylvania; 119th Pennsylvania: Ltc Gideon Clark; 5th Wisconsin
First Division BG David A. Russell	4th Brigade Col Nelson Cross	65th New York; 67th New York; 122nd New York; 23rd Pennsylvania; 82nd Pennsylvania
Second Division BG Thomas H. Neill	1st Brigade BG Frank Wheaton	62nd New York; 93rd Pennsylvania; 98th Pennsylvania; 102nd Pennsylvania; 139th Pennsylvania
Second Division BG Thomas H. Neill	2nd Brigade BG Lewis A. Grant	1st Vermont Heavy Artillery; 2nd Vermont; 3rd Vermont; 4th Vermont; 5th Vermont; 6th Vermont
Second Division BG Thomas H. Neill	3rd Brigade Col Daniel D. Bidwell	7th Maine; 43rd New York; 49th New York; 77th New York; 61st Pennsylvania
Second Division BG Thomas H. Neill	4th Brigade Col Oliver Edwards	7th Massachusetts; 10th Massachusetts; 37th Massachusetts; 2nd Rhode Island
Third Division BG James B. Ricketts	1st Brigade Ltc Caldwell K. Hall	14th New Jersey; 106th New York; 151st New York; 87th Pennsylvania; 10th Vermont
Third Division BG James B. Ricketts	2nd Brigade Col Benjamin F. Smith	6th Maryland; 9th New York Heavy Artillery, 1st and 3rd Battalions; 110th Ohio; 122nd Ohio; 126th Ohio; 67th Pennsylvania; 138th Pennsylvania
	Artillery Brigade Col Charles H. Tompkins	Maine Light, 4th Battery (D); Maine Light, 5th Battery (E); Massachusetts Light, 1st Battery (A); 1st New Jersey Light, Battery A; New York Light, 1st Battery; New York Light, 3rd Battery; 9th New York Heavy, 2nd Battalion; 1st Ohio Light, Battery H; 1st Rhode Island Light, Battery C; 1st Rhode Island Light, Battery E; 1st Rhode Island Light, Battery G; 5th United States, Battery E; 5th United States, Battery M

==== IX Corps ====
MG Ambrose E. Burnside

General Staff:

- Chief of Staff: MG John G. Parke
- Chief of Artillery: Ltc J. Albert Monroe

Provost Guard:

- 8th United States

Division	Brigade	Regiments and Others
First Division MG Thomas L. Crittenden; BG James H. Ledlie	1st Brigade BG James H. Ledlie; Col Jacob P. Gould	56th Massachusetts; 57th Massachusetts; 59th Massachusetts: Col Jacob P. Gould; 4th United States; 10th United States
First Division MG Thomas L. Crittenden; BG James H. Ledlie	2nd Brigade Col Ebenezer W. Peirce	3rd Maryland; 21st Massachusetts; 29th Massachusetts; 179th New York; 100th Pennsylvania
First Division MG Thomas L. Crittenden; BG James H. Ledlie	Provisional Brigade Col Elisha G. Marshall	2nd New York Mounted Rifles (dismounted); 14th New York Heavy Artillery; 24th New York Cavalry (dismounted); 2nd Pennsylvania Provisional Heavy Artillery
First Division MG Thomas L. Crittenden; BG James H. Ledlie	Acting Engineers	35th Massachusetts
First Division MG Thomas L. Crittenden; BG James H. Ledlie	Artillery	Maine Light, 2nd Battery (B); Massachusetts Light, 14th Battery; New York Light, 27th Battery
Second Division BG Robert B. Potter	1st Brigade Col John I. Curtin	36th Massachusetts; 58th Massachusetts; 45th Pennsylvania; 48th Pennsylvania; 7th Rhode Island
Second Division BG Robert B. Potter	2nd Brigade BG Simon G. Griffin	2nd Maryland (detachment); 31st Maine; 32nd Maine; 6th New Hampshire; 9th New Hampshire; 11th New Hampshire; 17th Vermont
Second Division BG Robert B. Potter	Acting Engineers	51st New York
Second Division BG Robert B. Potter	Artillery	Massachusetts Light, 11th Battery; New York Light, 19th Battery
Third Division BG Orlando B. Willcox	1st Brigade Col John F. Hartranft	2nd Michigan; 8th Michigan; 27th Michigan; 109th New York; 51st Pennsylvania; 38th Wisconsin
Third Division BG Orlando B. Willcox	2nd Brigade Col Benjamin C. Christ	1st Michigan Sharpshooters; 20th Michigan; 46th New York; 60th Ohio; 50th Pennsylvania
Third Division BG Orlando B. Willcox	Acting Engineers	17th Michigan
Third Division BG Orlando B. Willcox	Artillery	Maine Light, 7th Battery (G); New York Light, 34th Battery
Fourth Division BG Edward Ferrero	1st Brigade Col Joshua K. Sigfried	27th United States Colored Troops; 30th United States Colored Troops; 39th United States Colored Troops; 43rd United States Colored Troops
Fourth Division BG Edward Ferrero	2nd Brigade Col Henry G. Thomas	19th United States Colored Troops; 23rd United States Colored Troops; 31st United States Colored Troops
Fourth Division BG Edward Ferrero	Artillery	Pennsylvania Light, Battery D; Vermont Light, 3rd Battery

==== Cavalry Corps ====
MG Philip H. Sheridan

Escort:

- 6th United States

Division	Brigade	Regiments and Others
First Division; BG Alfred T. A. Torbert	1st Brigade BG George A. Custer	1st Michigan; 5th Michigan; 6th Michigan; 7th Michigan
First Division; BG Alfred T. A. Torbert	2nd Brigade Col Thomas C. Devin	4th New York; 6th New York; 9th New York; 17th Pennsylvania
First Division; BG Alfred T. A. Torbert	Reserve Brigade BG Wesley Merritt	19th New York (1st Dragoons); 6th Pennsylvania; 1st United States; 2nd United States; 5th United States
Second Division; BG David McM. Gregg	1st Brigade BG Henry E. Davies, Jr.	1st Massachusetts; 1st New Jersey; 10th New York; 6th Ohio; 1st Pennsylvania
Second Division; BG David McM. Gregg	2nd Brigade Col J. Irvin Gregg	1st Maine; 2nd Pennsylvania; 4th Pennsylvania; 8th Pennsylvania; 13th Pennsylvania; 16th Pennsylvania
Third Division; BG James H. Wilson	1st Brigade Col John B. McIntosh	1st Connecticut; 3rd New Jersey; 2nd New York; 5th New York; 2nd Ohio; 18th Pennsylvania
Third Division; BG James H. Wilson	2nd Brigade Col George H. Chapman	3rd Indiana; 1st New Hampshire; 8th New York; 22nd New York; 1st Vermont
Third Division; BG James H. Wilson	Escort	8th Illinois (detachment)
	Horse Artillery Brigade Cpt James M. Robertson	1st United States, Batteries H and I; 1st United States, Battery K; 2nd United States, Battery A; 2nd United States, Batteries B and L; 2nd United States, Battery D; 2nd United States, Battery M; 3rd United States, Batteries C, F, and K; 4th United States, Batteries C and E

==== Artillery ====
Division	Brigade	Regiments and Others
Artillery; BG Henry J. Hunt	Artillery Park Ltc Freeman McGilvery	15th New York Heavy, 2nd Battalion

=== Army of the James ===
==== XVIII Corps ====
MG William F. Smith

Division	Brigade	Regiments and Others
First Division BG William T. H. Brooks	1st Brigade BG Gilman Marston	81st New York; 96th New York; 98th New York; 139th New York
First Division BG William T. H. Brooks	2nd Brigade BG Hiram Burnham	8th Connecticut; 10th New Hampshire; 13th New Hampshire; 118th New York
First Division BG William T. H. Brooks	3rd Brigade Col Guy V. Henry	21st Connecticut; 40th Massachusetts; 92nd New York; 58th Pennsylvania; 188th Pennsylvania
Second Division BG John H. Martindale	1st Brigade BG George J. Stannard	23rd Massachusetts; 25th Massachusetts; 27th Massachusetts; 9th New Jersey; 89th New York; 55th Pennsylvania
Second Division BG John H. Martindale	2nd Brigade Col Griffin A. Stedman, Jr.	11th Connecticut; 8th Maine; 2nd New Hampshire; 12th New Hampshire; 148th New York
Third Division BG Adelbert Ames	1st Brigade Col William B. Barton	47th New York; 48th New York; 115th New York; 76th Pennsylvania
Third Division BG Adelbert Ames	2nd Brigade Col Alexander Piper; Col N. Martin Curtis	13th Indiana; 9th Maine; 112th New York; 169th New York; 10th New York Heavy Artillery
Third Division BG Adelbert Ames	3rd Brigade Col Henry R. Guss; Col Louis Bell	4th New Hampshire: Col Louis Bell; 3rd New York; 117th New York; 142nd New York: Col N. Martin Curtis; 97th Pennsylvania
	Artillery Brigade Cpt Samuel S. Elder	1st United States, Battery B; 4th United States, Battery L; 5th United States, Battery A

== See also ==
- Wilderness Union order of battle
- Spotsylvania Court House Union order of battle
