= Battle of Hatcher's Run order of battle: Union =

The following Union Army units and commanders fought in the Battle of Hatcher's Run (February 5-7, 1865) during the Petersburg campaign of the American Civil War. Order of battle is compiled from the official tabulation of casualties and includes only units which sustained casualties.

== Abbreviations used ==
=== Military rank ===
- MG = Major General
- BG = Brigadier General
- Col = Colonel
- Ltc = Lieutenant Colonel
- Maj = Major
- Cpt = Captain

=== Other ===
- w = wounded
- m = mortally wounded
- k = killed
- c = captured

== Army of the Potomac ==
=== II Corps ===
MG Andrew A. Humphreys

Division	Brigade	Regiments and Others
First Division [not engaged]	4th Brigade Col John Ramsey	8th New York Heavy Artillery; 64th New York; 53rd Pennsylvania; 116th Pennsylvania; 144th Pennsylvania
Second Division; BG Thomas A. Smyth	1st Brigade Col William A. Olmsted	19th Massachusetts; 20th Massachusetts; 59th New York; 184th Pennsylvania
Second Division; BG Thomas A. Smyth	2nd Brigade Col Mathew Murphy (mw) 5 Feb; Col James Patrick McIvor	8th New York Heavy Artillery; 164th New York; 170th New York; 182nd New York
Second Division; BG Thomas A. Smyth	3rd Brigade Ltc Francis E. Pierce	14th Connecticut; 12th New Jersey; 10th New York Battalion (Zouaves); 69th Pennsylvania
Second Division; BG Thomas A. Smyth	Unattached	3rd Pennsylvania Cavalry Battalion
Third Division; MG Gershom Mott	1st Brigade BG Régis de Trobriand	17th Maine; 40th New York; 86th New York; 110th Pennsylvania; 2nd US Sharpshooters
Third Division; MG Gershom Mott	2nd Brigade BG George W. West	1st Massachusetts Heavy Artillery; 5th Michigan; 57th Pennsylvania; 141st Pennsylvania
Third Division; MG Gershom Mott	3rd Brigade BG Robert McAllister	7th New Jersey; 8th New Jersey; 11th New Jersey; 120th New York

=== V Corps ===
MG Gouverneur K. Warren

Escort: 4th Pennsylvania Cavalry, Company C
Provost Guard: 104th New York

Division	Brigade	Regiments and Others
First Division; Bvt MG Charles Griffin	1st Brigade Bvt BG Horatio G. Sickel	185th New York; 198th Pennsylvania
First Division; Bvt MG Charles Griffin	2nd Brigade Col Allen L. Burr	187th New York Battalion; 188th New York Battalion; 189th New York
First Division; Bvt MG Charles Griffin	3rd Brigade Bvt BG Alfred L. Pearson	20th Maine; 32nd Massachusetts; 1st Michigan; 16th Michigan; 83rd Pennsylvania, 6 Companies; 91st Pennsylvania; 118th Pennsylvania; 155th Pennsylvania (Zouaves)
Second Division; Bvt MG Romeyn B. Ayres	1st Brigade Zouave Brigade Bvt BG Frederick Winthrop	5th New York Veterans; 15th New York Heavy Artillery; 140th New York; 146th New York
Second Division; Bvt MG Romeyn B. Ayres	2nd Brigade Col Richard N. Bowerman	1st Maryland; 4th Maryland; 7th Maryland; 8th Maryland
Second Division; Bvt MG Romeyn B. Ayres	3rd Brigade Bvt BG James Gwyn	3rd Delaware; 4th Delaware; 157th Pennsylvania (4 companies); 190th Pennsylvania; 191st Pennsylvania; 210th Pennsylvania
Third Division; Bvt MG Samuel W. Crawford	1st Brigade BG Edward S. Bragg	24th Michigan: Ltc Albert M. Edwards; 143rd Pennsylvania; 149th Pennsylvania; 150th Pennsylvania; 6th Wisconsin; 7th Wisconsin
Third Division; Bvt MG Samuel W. Crawford	2nd Brigade BG Henry Baxter	16th Maine; 39th Massachusetts; 97th New York; 11th Pennsylvania; 88th Pennsylvania
Third Division; Bvt MG Samuel W. Crawford	3rd Brigade Bvt BG Henry A. Morrow (w); Col Thomas F. McCoy	94th New York; 95th New York; 147th New York; 56th Pennsylvania; 107th Pennsylvania; 121st Pennsylvania; 142nd Pennsylvania

=== VI Corps ===
Division	Brigade	Regiments and Others
First Division; BG Frank Wheaton	1st Brigade [not engaged]	
First Division; BG Frank Wheaton	2nd Brigade Col James Hubbard	2nd Connecticut Heavy Artillery; 65th New York; 121st New York; 95th Pennsylvania (Zouaves)
First Division; BG Frank Wheaton	3rd Brigade BG Joseph E. Hamblin	37th Massachusetts; 5th Wisconsin
Second Division [not engaged]		
Third Division [not engaged]		

=== Cavalry ===
Division	Brigade	Regiments and Others
First Division [not engaged]		
Second Division; BG David McM. Gregg	1st Brigade BG Henry E. Davies, Jr.	1st Massachusetts; 1st New Jersey; 10th New York; 24th New York; 1st Pennsylvania (5 companies)
Second Division; BG David McM. Gregg	2nd Brigade BG John Irvin Gregg (w); Col Michael Kerwin	2nd Pennsylvania; 4th Pennsylvania; 8th Pennsylvania; 13th Pennsylvania; 16th Pennsylvania
Second Division; BG David McM. Gregg	3rd Brigade Col Oliver B. Knowles	1st Maine; 6th Ohio; 12th Ohio; 21st Pennsylvania
