= 5th Massachusetts Battery =

Artillery battery of the Union Army

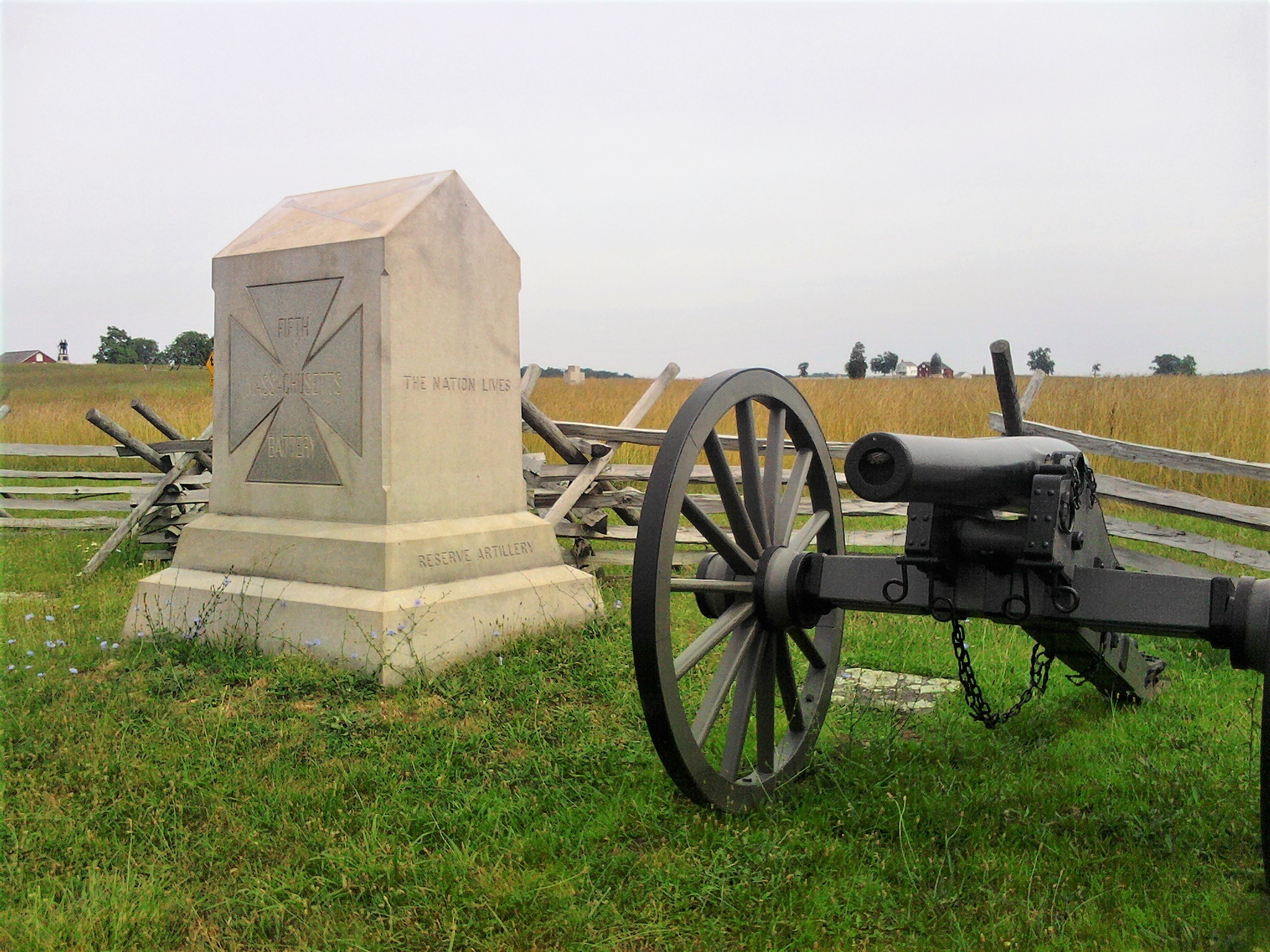
- 5th Massachusetts Battery Monument on the Gettysburg Battlefield near the Peach Orchard
- Active: December 10, 1861 – June 12, 1865
- Country: United States
- Branch: Union Army
- Type: Field artillery
- Size: Battery
- Part of: Artillery, 1st Division, III Corps; Artillery Brigade, V Corps; Reserve Artillery, AoP
- Engagements: American Civil War

Commanders
- 1st: Captain Max Eppendorf
- 2nd: Capt. George D. Allen
- 3rd: Capt. Charles A. Phillips

The 5th Massachusetts Battery (or 5th Battery, Massachusetts Light Artillery) was an artillery battery of the Union Army during the American Civil War. Raised in late 1861, it eventually was consolidated with the remnants of the 3rd Massachusetts Battery, and served until June 1865. Operating in the Eastern Theater, for most of the war it was part of the Army of the Potomac.

== Service history ==
The battery was organized in response to President Abraham Lincoln's call on May 2, 1861, for volunteer troops, to serve a term of three-years. The battery trained at Camp Shouler in Lynnfield, Massachusetts and Camp Massasoit in Readville, Massachusetts. It departed Boston by steamship on December 25, 1861.

For their first months of service, the members of the battery performed garrison duty at Capitol Hill in Washington and at Hall's Hill in Alexandria, Virginia, being assigned to Gen. Fitz-John Porters division of the III Corps. With the Army of the Potomac it preparated for the Peninsular Campaign in March 1862. They departed for Fortress Monroe on March 21. During the Peninsular campaign the battery was engaged in the Siege of Yorktown. In May the division, and with it the battery, became part of the new V Corps. They then fought in the Seven Days Battles. In particular, it was very heavily engaged during the Battle of Gaines's Mill, losing 4 men killed in action, 22 horses and four out of six guns. For several months, this heavy loss resulted the temporary reassignment of the members of the 5th Massachusetts Battery to the 3rd Massachusetts Battery and the 4th Rhode Island Battery. The 5th Massachusetts Battery returned to Washington in September 1862 and was resupplied with guns in October. It rejoined the Army of the Potomac in time to participate in the Union advance into Northern Virginia in November and the Battle of Fredericksburg.

In 1863, the battery took part in the Mud March and the Battle of Chancellorsville. Afterwards it served some time in the Artillery Reserve of the Army of the Potomac and with it was heavily engaged during the Battle of Gettysburg on July 2 and 3, firing 700 rounds and losing 7 men killed in action and 59 horses. During the latter part of 1863, they took part in the Mine Run Campaign and at the end of the year went into winter camp at Rappahannock Station (now Remington, Virginia). In 1864, they participated in Lieutenant General Ulysses S. Grant's Overland Campaign and the Siege of Petersburg.

In September 1864, the recruits and reenlisted men of the 3rd Massachusetts Battery were consolidated with the 5th Massachusetts Battery. On October 3, those of the 5th Massachusetts Battery who had served out their term and did not reenlist went home. A total of 39 of the original members did reenlist for a second term of three years so that, with the addition of some new recruits, the battery continued to serve. They operated at various points along the Petersburg siege lines but for the most part the battery was stationed at Fort Hays to the south of Petersburg. During the final assault on Petersburg on April 1 and 2, 1865, a detachment operating two guns of the battery took Confederate Battery 27 on the siege lines. This engagement was the last time the battery fired their guns in battle. When the Confederates abandoned Petersburg, the battery was withdrawn to City Point, Virginia and remained there until May 3. On that day the unit began its return to Massachusetts, marching to Washington to turn in their guns and equipment. They reached Boston on June 3 and were mustered out at Camp Meigs on June 12, 1865.

== Battery commanders ==
The following officers served as Captains of the battery throughout the war:

- Max Eppendorf - resigned on January 25, 1862
- George D. Allen - resigned on October 17, 1862
- Charles A. Phillips - mustered out with the battery on June 12, 1865

== See also ==
- Massachusetts in the Civil War
- List of Massachusetts Civil War units
