= 139th New York Infantry Regiment =

- Active: September 9, 1862 - June 19, 1865
- Disbanded: June 19, 1865
- Country: United States
- Allegiance: Union
- Branch: Union Army
- Type: Infantry
- Role: Infantry
- Size: Regiment
- Engagements: Several skirmishes, Battle of Swift Creek, Battle of Proctor's Creek, Battle of Cold Harbor, Siege of Petersburg, Second Battle of Petersburg, Battle of the Crater, Battle of Chaffin's Farm, Battle of Fair Oaks & Darbytown Road

Commanders
- Regimental Commander: Colonel Anthony Conk
- Regimental Commander: Colonel Samuel H. Roberts
- Regimental Commander: Lt. Colonel Thomas Mulcahy
- Notable commanders: Col. Samuel H. Roberts

The 139th New York Infantry Regiment was an infantry regiment of Union Army in the American Civil War. The regiment was organized in 1862 in Brooklyn, New York. Volunteers were mostly recruited from Brooklyn, with some men being recruited from the surrounding areas.

== Detailed service ==
Duty at Camp Hamilton, Va., September 20, 1862, to April, 1863. Action at Whittaker's Mills, Williamsburg and Fort Magruder April 11, 1863. Moved to Yorktown, Va., April, and duty there, at Williamsburg and in the District of the Currituck till April, 1864. Dix's Peninsula Campaign June 24-July 7, 1863. Expedition from White House to Bottom's Bridge July 1–7. Baltimore Cross Roads July 2. Crump's Cross Roads, Bottom's Bridge, July 2–8. Expedition from Williamsburg to Charles City Court House December 12–14. Near Chickahominy River December 11. Forge Bridge December 12. Charles City Court House December 18. Scouts from Williamsburg January 19 and 24, 1864. Wistar's Expedition against Richmond February 6–8. Butler's operations on south side of the James River and against Petersburg and Richmond May 4–28. Occupation of City Point and Bermuda Hundred May 5. Swift Creek or Arrowfield Church May 9–10. Operations against Fort Darling May 12–16. Battle of Drury's Bluff May 14–16. Bermuda Hundred May 16–27. Moved to White House, thence to Cold Harbor May 28–31. Battles about Cold Harbor June 1–12. Before Petersburg June 15–18. Siege operations against Petersburg and Richmond June 16, 1864, to April 2, 1865. In trenches before Petersburg and on the Bermuda Hundred front till September 27, 1864. Mine Explosion, Petersburg, July 30 (Reserve). Battle of Chaffin's Farm, New Market Heights, September 28–30. Assault and capture of Fort Harrison September 29. Battle of Fair Oaks October 27–28. Duty in lines before Richmond till April, 1865. Occupation of Richmond April 3. Provost duty at Richmond and Manchester, Va., till June. Mustered out June 19, 1865. Veterans and Recruits transferred to 98th New York Volunteer Infantry Regiment.

== Casualties ==
By the time the regiment was mustered out, 5 Officers and 66 Enlisted men were killed and mortally wounded and 1 Officer and 79 Enlisted men died by disease, a total of 151 dead.

== See also ==
- List of New York Civil War regiments
