= Independent Battery D, Pennsylvania Light Artillery =

- Active: 21 Sept. 1861 – 13 June 1865
- Country: United States
- Allegiance: (United States) Union; Pennsylvania
- Branch: Union Army
- Type: Field Artillery
- Size: Artillery Battery
- Equipment: Six 10-pounder Parrott rifles (1862)
- Engagements: American Civil War; Second Battle of Bull Run (1862); Battle of Chantilly (1862); Battle of South Mountain (1862); Battle of Antietam (1862); Battle of Fredericksburg (1862); Siege of Vicksburg (1863); Second Battle of Petersburg (1864); Battle of the Crater (1864); Battle of Ream's Station (1864); Battle of Peebles's Farm (1864); Battle of Fort Stedman (1865); Third Battle of Petersburg (1865)

Commanders
- Notable commanders: George W. Durell

Independent Battery D, Pennsylvania Light Artillery, was an artillery battery that served in the Union Army during the American Civil War. The unit organized on 21 September 1861 and served until 13 June 1865. The battery participated in the battles of Second Bull Run, Chantilly, South Mountain, Antietam, and Fredericksburg in 1862. The following year, Battery D transferred to the Western theater where it took part in the Siege of Vicksburg and other operations. The years 1864–65 saw the unit fight at the first Petersburg assault, the Crater, Ream's Station, Battle of Peebles's Farm, Fort Stedman, and the final Petersburg assault. Battery D took part in the Grand Review of the Armies before being mustered out.

== Service ==
Organized at Doylestown and mustered on September 24, 1861. Left State for Washington, D.C., November 5, 1861. Attached to McDowell's Division, Army of the Potomac, to March, 1862. King's 1st Division, 1st Army Corps, Army of the Potomac, to April, 1862. King's Division, Dept. of the Rappahannock, to June, 1862. Artillery, 1st Division, 3rd Army Corps, Army of Virginia, to August, 1862. Artillery, 2nd Division, 9th Army Corps, Army of the Potomac, to April, 1863. Army of the Ohio to June, 1863, and Army of the Tennessee to August, 1863. Covington, Ky., Dept. of the Ohio, to March, 1864. Artillery, 4th Division, 9th Army Corps, Army of the Potomac, to June, 1865.

Battery lost during service 1 Officer and 2 Enlisted men killed and mortally wounded and 21 Enlisted men by disease. Total 24.

== Detailed service ==
SERVICE.--Duty at Kalorama Heights, Defenses of Washington, D.C., until November 14, 1861. At East Capital Hill until December 18, and at Munson's Hill until March 10, 1862. Advance on Manassas, Va., March 10–15. McDowell's advance to Falmouth April 9–19. Capture of Fredericksburg April 18. Expedition to Thoroughfare Gap and operations against Jackson May 29-June 21. At Falmouth until August. Pope's Campaign in Northern Virginia August 16-September 2. Kelly's Ford August 21. Near Warrenton August 22–23 supporting Buford's Cavalry. Kettle Run or Bristoe Station August 27. Battle of Bull Run August 29–30. Chantilly September 1. Maryland Campaign September 6–24. Battles of South Mountain September 14, and Antietam September 16–17. At Pleasant Valley until October 25. Movement to Falmouth, Va., October 25-November 19. Warrenton or Sulphur Springs November 15. Berryville December 2. Battle of Fredericksburg, Va., December 12–15. "Mud March" January 20–24, 1863. Moved to Newport News February 7, thence to Cynthiana, Ky., March 23-April 1. At Paris, Mt. Sterling, Richmond, Lancaster, Crab Orchard and Stanford, Ky., until June. Movement to Vicksburg, Miss., June 3–14. Siege of Vicksburg June 15-July 4. Advance on Jackson, Miss., July 5–10. Siege of Jackson July 10–17. At Milldale until August 6. Moved to Covington, Ky., August 6–22, and duty there until March 21, 1864. Moved to Johnson's Island, Lake Erie, Ohio, November 12–16 to repel threatened raid to release prisoners. Moved to Annapolis, Md., March 21–26. Rapidan Campaign May–June. Guarding supply trains through the Wilderness and to James River May 4-June 16. Siege of Petersburg June 16–18 to April 2, 1865. Mine Explosion, Petersburg, July 30, 1864. Ream's Station, Weldon Railroad, August 25. Peeble's Farm, Poplar Grove Church, September 30-October 1. Old members mustered out September 23, 1864. Fort Stedman March 25, 1865. Assault on and fall of Petersburg April 2. Moved to City Point April 20; thence to Alexandria April 25–27. Grand Review May 23. Mustered out June 13, 1865.

== See also ==
- List of Pennsylvania Civil War units
