= 183rd Pennsylvania Infantry Regiment =

Union Army infantry regiment

183rd Pennsylvania Volunteer Infantry
- Active: December 24, 1863 – July 13, 1865
- Country: United States of America
- Allegiance: Union
- Branch: Infantry
- Engagements: Battle of the Wilderness; Battle of Spotsylvania Court House; Battle of Totopotomoy Creek; Battle of Cold Harbor; Siege of Petersburg; First Battle of Deep Bottom; Second Battle of Deep Bottom; Second Battle of Ream's Station; Battle of Boydton Plank Road; Battle of Hatcher's Run; Appomattox Campaign; Battle of White Oak Road; Battle of Sutherland's Station; Battle of Sailor's Creek; Battle of High Bridge; Battle of Appomattox Court House

The 183rd Pennsylvania Volunteer Infantry was an infantry regiment that served in the Union Army during the American Civil War. The regiment was nicknamed "The Fourth Union League Regiment".

== Service ==
The 183rd Pennsylvania Infantry was organized at Philadelphia, Pennsylvania, beginning December 24, 1863, and continuing through March 8, 1864, under the command of Colonel George P. McClean.

The regiment was attached to 1st Brigade, 1st Division, II Corps, Army of the Potomac, to March 1865. 4th Brigade, 1st Division, II Corps, to July 1865.

The 183rd Pennsylvania Infantry mustered out of service on July 13, 1865.

== Detailed service ==
Campaign from the Rapidan to the James River, Va., May 4 – June 12, 1864. Battle of the Wilderness May 5–7; Corbin's Bridge May 8; Spotsylvania May 8–12; Po River May 10; Spotsylvania Court House May 12–21. Assault on the Salient May 12. North Anna River May 23–26. On line of the Pamunkey May 26–28. Totopotomoy May 28–31. Cold Harbor June 1–12. Before Petersburg June 16–18. Siege of Petersburg June 16, 1864, to April 2, 1865. Jerusalem Plank Road, Weldon Railroad, June 22–23, 1864. Demonstration north of the James at Deep Bottom July 27–29. Deep Bottom July 27–28. Mine Explosion, Petersburg, July 30 (reserve). Demonstration north of the James at Deep Bottom August 13–20. Deep Bottom, August 14–18. Ream's Station August 25. Boydton Plank Road, October 27–28. Reconnaissance to Hatcher's Run December 9–10. Hatcher's Run, February 5–7, 1865. Watkins' House March 25. Appomattox Campaign March 28-April 9. Hatcher's Run or Boydton Road March 30–31. White Oak Road March 31. Sutherland's Station April 2. Sailor's Creek April 6. High Bridge, Farmville, April 7. Appomattox Court House April 9. Surrender of Lee and his army. March to Washington, D.C., May 2–12. Grand Review of the Armies May 23.

== Casualties ==
The regiment lost a total of 187 men during service; 4 officers and 92 enlisted men killed or mortally wounded, 2 officers and 89 enlisted men died of disease.

== Commanders ==
- Colonel George P. McLean
- Colonel James Canning Lynch
- Colonel George T. Egbert

== See also ==
- List of Pennsylvania Civil War Units
- Pennsylvania in the Civil War
