= 60th Ohio Infantry Regiment =

- Active: February 25, 1862, to November 10, 1862; February 1864 to July 28, 1865
- Country: United States
- Allegiance: Union
- Branch: Union Army
- Type: Infantry
- Engagements: Battle of Cross Keys; Battle of Harpers Ferry; Battle of the Wilderness; Battle of Spotsylvania Court House; Battle of Totopotomoy Creek; Battle of Cold Harbor; Siege of Petersburg; Battle of the Crater; Appomattox Campaign; Third Battle of Petersburg

The 60th Ohio Infantry Regiment was an infantry regiment in the Union Army during the American Civil War.

== First organization ==
The 60th Ohio Infantry Regiment was first organized in Gallipolis, Ohio and mustered in for one-years' service on February 25, 1862, under the command of Colonel William H. Trimble.

The regiment was unattached, Kanawha District, West Virginia, to April 1862. Cluserett's Advance Brigade, Department of the Mountains, to June 1862. Piatt's Brigade, 1st Division, I Corps, Army of Virginia, to September 1862. Miles' Command, Harpers Ferry, Virginia, September 1862.

The regiment served duty at Franklin May 25, 1862. Participated in the pursuit of Jackson up the Shenandoah Valley June. Mt. Carmel Road, near Strasburg, June 1. Strasburg and Staunton Road June 1–2. Harrisonburg June 6. Battle of Cross Keys June 9. Moved to Strasburg June 19–22, then to Middletown June 24, and duty there until July. At Winchester, Va., until September 2. Evacuation of Winchester September 2, and retreat to Harpers Ferry. Defense of Harpers Ferry September 11–15. Bolivar Heights September 14.

The regiment surrendered September 15, paroled as prisoners of war September 16, and sent to Annapolis, Maryland, then to Camp Douglas, Chicago, Illinois. COL Trimble successfully prevented rebels from enslaving free black servants of the wardroom upon surrender. The 60th Ohio Infantry mustered out of service November 10, 1862.

== Casualties ==
During its first service, the regiment lost at total of 42 men; 1 officer and 9 enlisted men killed or mortally wounded, 2 officers and 30 enlisted men due to disease.

== Second organization ==
The 60th Ohio Infantry was reorganized in Cleveland and Columbus, Ohio February through April 1864 under the command of Lieutenant Colonel James N. McElroy. Several of the companies were mustered into federal service by Medal of Honor recipient, Rufus King Jr. It did not reach a strength of ten companies until February 1865.

The regiment was attached to 2nd Brigade, 3rd Division, IX Corps, Army of the Potomac, to September 1864. 2nd Brigade, 1st Division, IX Corps, to July 1865.

Left Ohio for Alexandria, Va., April 21, 1864. Campaign from the Rapidan to the James River, Va., May 3-June 15, 1864. Battles of the Wilderness May 5–7. Spotsylvania May 8–12. Ny River May 10. Spotsylvania Court House May 12–21. Assault on the Salient May 12. North Anna River May 23–26. Ox Ford May 23–24. On line of the Pamunkey May 26–28. Totopotomoy May 28–31. Cold Harbor June 1–12. Bethesda Church June 1–3. Before Petersburg June 16–18. Siege of Petersburg June 16, 1864, to April 2, 1865. Mine Explosion July 30, 1864. Six-Mile House, Weldon Railroad, August 18–21. Poplar Springs Church September 29-October 2. Reconnaissance on Vaughan and Squirrel Level Road October 8. Boydton Plank Road, Ratcher's Run, October 27–28. (Company K organized November and December 1864); 9th and 10th Independent Companies Sharpshooters as Companies G and H, February 25, 1865. Fort Stedman March 25, 1865. Appomattox Campaign March 28-April 9. Assault on and fall of Petersburg April 2. Occupation of Petersburg April 3. Pursuit of Lee April 3–9. Surrender of Lee and his army at Appomattox Court House April 9. Moved to Alexandria, Va., April 21–28. Duty there and at Washington, D.C., until July. Grand Review of the Armies at Washington May 23.

== Casualties ==
The reorganized regiment lost a total of 243 men during service; 3 officers and 110 enlisted men killed or mortally wounded, 130 enlisted men died of disease.

== Notable members ==
- Private John H. Wageman, Company I - Medal of Honor recipient for action during the siege of Petersburg, Virginia, June 17, 1864

== See also ==
- List of Ohio Civil War units
- Ohio in the Civil War
- Battle of Harpers Ferry
- Battle of the Wilderness
- Battle of Spotsylvania Court House
- Siege of Petersburg
- Appomattox Campaign
