= 11th Independent Battery, New York Volunteer Light Artillery =

11th Independent Battery, New York Light Artillery, U.S. Volunteers
- Active: January 8, 1862 to June 13, 1865
- Country: United States
- Allegiance: Union
- Branch: Artillery
- Engagements: Battle of Fredericksburg; Battle of Chancellorsville; Battle of Gettysburg; Bristoe Campaign; Mine Run Campaign; Battle of Spotsylvania Court House; Battle of Cold Harbor; Siege of Petersburg; Battle of Jerusalem Plank Road; First Battle of Deep Bottom; Appomattox Campaign; Battle of Sailor's Creek; Battle of Appomattox Court House

The 11th Independent Battery, New York Volunteer Light Artillery or 11th New York Light Artillery was an artillery battery that served in the Union Army during the American Civil War.

== Service ==
The battery was organized at Albany, New York and mustered in for a three-year enlistment on January 8, 1862, under the command of Captain Albert A. Von Puttkammer.

The battery was attached to James S. Wadsworth's Command, Military District of Washington, to August 1862. Whipple's Brigade, Defenses of Washington, to November 1862. Artillery Brigade, 3rd Division, III Corps, Army of the Potomac, to May 1863. Artillery Brigade, III Corps, to May 12, 1863. 4th Volunteer Brigade, Artillery Reserve, Army of the Potomac, to June 1863. 3rd Volunteer Brigade, Artillery Reserve, to July 1863. Attached to Battery K, 1st New York Light Artillery, to December 1863. 2nd Brigade, Artillery Reserve, Army of the Potomac, to April 1864. 3rd Brigade, Artillery Reserve, to May 1864. Artillery Brigade, II Corps, May 16 to August 1864. 1st Division, II Corps, August 1864. Artillery Brigade, II Corps, to May 1865. Artillery Reserve to June 1865.

The 11th New York Light Artillery mustered out of service on June 13, 1865.

== Detailed service ==
Moved to Washington, D.C., January 17, 1862. Duty in the defenses of Washington, building Fort Ellsworth, and duty there until August 25, 1862. John Pope Campaign in northern Virginia August 25-September 2. Bull Run Bridge August 27. Plains of Manassas August 28–29. 2nd Battle of Bull Run August 30. Duty in the defenses of Washington until November. Movement to Falmouth, Va., November. Battle of Fredericksburg, Va., December 12–15. "Mud March" January 20–24, 1863. At Falmouth until April. Chancellorsville Campaign April 27-May 6. Battle of Chancellorsville May 1–5. Battle of Gettysburg July 1–3. On line of the Rappahannock until October. Bristoe Campaign October 9–22. Bristoe Station October 14. Advance to line of the Rappahannock November 7–8. Kelly's Ford November 7. Mine Run Campaign November 26-December 2. Campaign from the Rapidan to the James May 3-June 15. Battle of the Wilderness May 5–7. Spotsylvania May 8–12. Spotsylvania Court House May 12–21. North Anna River May 23–26. On line of the Pamunkey May 26–28. Totopotomoy May 28–31. Cold Harbor June 1–12. Before Petersburg June 16–18. Siege of Petersburg June 16, 1864 to April 2, 1865. Jerusalem Plank Road June 22–23, 1864. Demonstration on north side of the James River July 27–29. Deep Bottom July 27–28. Demonstration north of the James August 13–20. Strawberry Plains, New Market Heights, August 14–18. Appomattox Campaign March 28-April 9, 1865. Sailor's Creek April 6. High Bridge April 7. Appomattox Court House April 9. Surrender of Lee and his army. Moved to Washington, D.C., May. Grand Review of the Armies May 23.

== Casualties ==
The battery lost a total of 21 men during service; 8 enlisted men were killed or mortally wounded; 13 enlisted men died of disease.

== Commanders ==
- Captain Albert A. Von Puttkammer
- Captain Robert H. Fitzhugh
- Captain John E. Burton - commanded at the Battle of Chancellorsville while still at the rank of lieutenant
- Captain George W. Davey
- Lieutenant James A. Manning - commanded during the Appomattox Campaign

== See also ==
- List of New York Civil War regiments
- New York in the Civil War
