= 115th Pennsylvania Infantry Regiment =

Union Army infantry regiment

115th Pennsylvania Volunteer Infantry
- Active: November 6, 1861 – June 22, 1864
- Country: United States of America
- Allegiance: Union
- Branch: Infantry
- Engagements: Second Battle of Bull Run; Battle of Fredericksburg; Battle of Chancellorsville; Battle of Gettysburg; Bristoe Campaign; Mine Run Campaign; Battle of the Wilderness; Battle of Spotsylvania Court House; Battle of Totopotomoy Creek; Battle of Cold Harbor; Siege of Petersburg

The 115th Pennsylvania Volunteer Infantry was an infantry regiment that served in the Union Army during the American Civil War.

== Service ==
The 115th Pennsylvania Infantry was organized at Harrisburg and Philadelphia, Pennsylvania beginning November 6, 1861 and mustered in January 28, 1862 for a three-year enlistment under the command of Colonel Robert Emmet Patterson.

The regiment was attached to 3rd Brigade, 2nd Division, III Corps, Army of the Potomac, to March 1864. 1st Brigade, 4th Division, II Corps, to May 1864. 3rd Brigade, 3rd Division, II Corps, to June 1864.

The 115th Pennsylvania Infantry ceased to exist on June 22, 1864 when it was consolidated with the 110th Pennsylvania Infantry.

== Detailed service ==
Moved from Camden to Harrisburg, Pennsylvania, May 31, 1862, then to Camp Hamilton, Virginia, June 25–28, and to Harrison's Landing, Virginia, July 4. Duty at Harrison's Landing, Virginia, until August 16, 1862. Moved to Centreville August 16–26. Action at Bristoe Station or Kettle Run August 27. Battle of Groveton August 29. Second Battle of Bull Run August 30. Duty in the defenses of Washington until November. At Fairfax Station November 2–25. Operations on Orange & Alexandria Railroad November 10–12. Duty near Falmouth, Virginia, November 28 – December 11. Battle of Fredericksburg December 12–15. Burnside's 2nd Campaign, "Mud March," January 20–24, 1863. Operations at Rappahannock Bridge and Grove Church February 5–7. Chancellorsville Campaign April 27 – May 6. Battle of Chancellorsville May 1–5. Gettysburg Campaign June 11 – July 24. Battle of Gettysburg, July 1–3. Pursuit of Lee, July 5–24. Wapping Heights, Virginia, July 23. Duty near Warrenton, Virginia, until October. Bristoe Campaign October 9–22. McLean's Ford, Bull Run, October 15. Advance to line of the Rappahannock November 7–8. Kelly's Ford November 7. Mine Run Campaign November 26 – December 2. Payne's Farm November 27. Demonstration on the Rapidan February 6–7, 1864. Duty near Brandy Station until May. Rapidan Campaign, May 4 – June 12. Battle of the Wilderness, May 5–7. Spotsylvania, May 8–12. Spotsylvania Court House May 12–21. Assault on the Salient, May 12. North Anna River, May 23–26. On line of the Pamunkey, May 26–28. Totopotomoy, May 28–31. Cold Harbor, June 1–12. Before Petersburg June 16–18.

== Casualties ==
The regiment lost a total of 80 men during service; six officers and 32 enlisted men killed or mortally wounded, two officers and 40 enlisted men died of disease.

== Commanders ==
- Colonel Robert Emmet Patterson – discharged December 2, 1862
- Colonel Francis A. Lancaster – killed in action at the Battle of Chancellorsville
- Lieutenant Colonel Robert Thompson – commanded at the Second Battle of Bull Run
- Lieutenant Colonel William A. Olmsted – commanded at the Battle of Fredericksburg
- Lieutenant Colonel John P. Dunne – commanded the regiment after the death of Col Lancaster until consolidated with the 110th Pennsylvania Infantry
- Major William A. Reilly – commanded at the Battle of the Wilderness

== See also ==
- List of Pennsylvania Civil War Units
- Pennsylvania in the Civil War
