= Battery C, 1st New York Light Artillery =

- Active: August 1861 - June 17, 1865
- Country: United States
- Allegiance: Union
- Branch: Artillery
- Engagements: Battle of Antietam; Battle of Fredericksburg; Battle of Chancellorsville; Battle of Gettysburg; Bristoe Campaign; Mine Run Campaign; Battle of Spotsylvania Court House; Battle of North Anna; Battle of Totopotomoy Creek; Battle of Cold Harbor; Siege of Petersburg; Battle of Globe Tavern; Appomattox Campaign; Third Battle of Petersburg

Battery C, 1st New York Light Artillery was an artillery battery that served in the Union Army during the American Civil War.

== Service ==
The battery was recruited in Watertown, New York in August 1861 and organized at Elmira, New York. It mustered in for a three-year enlistment on September 6, 1861, under the command of Captain John W. Tamblin.

The battery was attached to Wadsworth's Command, Military District of Washington, November 1861 to September 1862. 3rd Division, V Corps, Army of the Potomac, to May 1863. Artillery Brigade, V Corps, to April 1864. 3rd Brigade, Artillery Reserve, Army of the Potomac, to May 16, 1864. Artillery Brigade, V Corps, to March 1865. Artillery Reserve, attached to IX Corps, to June 1865.

Battery C, 1st New York Light Artillery mustered out of service on June 17, 1865.

== Detailed service ==
Left New York for Washington, D.C., October 31, 1861. Duty in the defenses of Washington, D.C., to August 1862. Action at Manassas Junction August 26. Bull Run Bridge August 27. Marched to Antietam, Md., September 14–18. Duty near Sharpsburg until October 30. Marched to Falmouth, Va., October 30 – November 19. Battle of Fredericksburg December 12–15. "Mud March" January 20–24, 1863. Duty near Falmouth until April 27. Rappahannock Station March 6. Chancellorsville Campaign April 27 – May 6. Battle of Chancellorsville May 1–5. Battle of Gettysburg July 1–3. Bristoe Campaign October 9–22. Advanced to line of the Rappahannock November 7–8. Rappahannock Station November 7. Mine Run Campaign November 26 – December 2. Robertson's Tavern November 27. Mine Run November 28–30. Camp near Rappahannock Station until April 1864. Campaign from the Rapidan to the James May 3 – June 15. Battle of the Wilderness May 5–7. Laurel Hill May 8. Spotsylvania May 8–12. Spotsylvania Court House May 12–21. North Anna River May 23–26. Jericho Mills May 23. On line of the Pamunkey May 26–28. Totopotomoy May 28–31. Cold Harbor June 1–12. Bethesda Church June 1–3. Before Petersburg June 16–18. Siege of Petersburg June 16, 1864, to April 2, 1865. Weldon Railroad August 18–21, 1864. Appomattox Campaign March 28 – April 9. Assault and capture of Petersburg April 2. Moved to Washington, D.C., May. Grand Review of the Armies May 23.

== Casualties ==
The battery lost a total of 22 men during service; 4 enlisted men killed or mortally wounded, 18 enlisted men died of disease.

== Commanders ==
- Captain John W. Tamblin – resigned January 27, 1862
- Captain Almont Barnes
- Captain David F. Ritchie
- 1st Lieutenant William H. Phillips - commanded at the Battle of Fredericksburg

== See also ==
- List of New York Civil War regiments
- New York in the Civil War
