= Battery H, 1st Ohio Light Artillery =

- Active: November 7, 1861 to June 14, 1865
- Country: United States
- Allegiance: Union
- Branch: Artillery
- Engagements: Battle of Winchester; Battle of Port Republic; Battle of Fredericksburg; Battle of Chancellorsville; Battle of Gettysburg; Bristoe Campaign; Mine Run Campaign; Battle of the Wilderness; Battle of Spottsylvania Court House; Battle of North Anna; Battle of Totopotomoy Creek; Battle of Cold Harbor; Siege of Petersburg

Battery H, 1st Ohio Light Artillery was an artillery battery that served in the Union Army during the American Civil War. It was also known as Huntington's Battery.

== Service ==
The battery was organized at Camp Dennison near Cincinnati, Ohio, and mustered in for a three-year enlistment on November 7, 1861, under Captain James F. Huntington. The regiment was organized as early as 1860 under Ohio's militia laws, under Colonel James Barnett.

The battery was attached to Landers' Division, Army of the Potomac, to March 1862. Artillery, Shields' 2nd Division, Banks' V Corps, and Department of the Shenandoah to May 1862. Artillery, Shields' Division, Department of the Shenandoah, to June 1862. Alexandria, Virginia, Military District of Washington, D.C., to October 1862. Artillery, 3rd Division, III Corps, Army of the Potomac, to May 1863. 1st Volunteer Brigade, Artillery Reserve, Army of the Potomac, to June 1863. 3rd Volunteer Brigade, Artillery Reserve, Army of the Potomac, to August 1863. 4th Volunteer Brigade, Artillery Reserve, Army of the Potomac, to October 1863. Artillery Brigade, II Corps, Army of the Potomac, to December 1863. Artillery Reserve, Army of the Potomac, to February 1864. 2nd Volunteer Brigade, Artillery Reserve, Army of the Potomac, to April 1864. 3rd Volunteer Brigade, Artillery Reserve, Army of the Potomac, to May 1864. Artillery Brigade, VI Corps, Army of the Potomac, to July 1864. Artillery Reserve, Army of the Potomac, to December 1864. Artillery Brigade, VI Corps, Army of the Potomac, to March 1865. Artillery Reserve, Army of the Potomac, to June 1865.

Battery H, 1st Ohio Light Artillery mustered out of service at Camp Taylor in Cleveland, Ohio on June 14, 1865.

== Detailed service ==
Left Ohio for Parkersburg, Va., January 20, 1862. Moved from Parkersburg to Paw Paw Tunnel January 1862, and duty there until March. Advance on Winchester March 7–15. Action at Strasburg March 19. Battle of Winchester March 23. Occupation of Mt. Jackson April 17. March to Fredericksburg, Va., May 12–21, and return to Front Royal May 25–30. Battle of Port Republic June 9. Moved to Alexandria June 29 and duty in the defenses of Washington, D.C., until October 17. Moved to Harper's Ferry, W. Va., October 17. Advance up Loudoun Valley and movement to Falmouth, Va., October 30-November 17. Battle of Fredericksburg, Va., December 12–15. At Falmouth until April 1863. "Mud March" January 20–24. Chancellorsville Campaign April 27-May 6. Battle of Chancellorsville May 1–5. Gettysburg campaign June 11-July 24. Battle of Gettysburg July 1–3. Advance from the Rappahannock to the Rapidan September 13–17. Bristoe Campaign October 9–22. Bristoe Station October 14. Advance to line of the Rappahannock November 7–8. Mine Run Campaign November 26-December 2. Campaign from the Rapidan to the James May 3-June 15, 1864. Battles of the Wilderness May 5–7; Spottsylvania May 8–21; North Anna River May 23–27. Line of the Pamunkey May 26–28. Totopotomoy May 28–31. Cold Harbor June 1–12. Before Petersburg June 16–18. Siege of Petersburg June 16, 1864 to April 2, 1865. Jerusalem Plank Road, Weldon Railroad, June 22–23, 1864. Fall of Petersburg April 2, 1865. Ordered to Cleveland, Ohio, for muster out June 5.

== Casualties ==
The battery lost a total of 32 men during service; 10 enlisted men killed or mortally wounded, 22 enlisted men died of disease.

== Commanders ==
- Captain James F. Huntington
- Captain George W. Norton - commanded as lieutenant at the battles of Fredericksburg and Gettysburg
- Captain Stephen Wallace Dorsey
- Lieutenant William A. Ewing - commanded at the Battle of the Wilderness

== Notable members ==
- Captain Stephen W. Dorsey - U.S. Senator from Arkansas, 1873–1879

== See also ==
- List of Ohio Civil War units
- Ohio in the Civil War
