= 23rd United States Colored Infantry Regiment =

23rd United States Colored Infantry
- Active: November 23, 1863 - November 30, 1865
- Country: United States
- Allegiance: Union
- Branch: Union Army
- Role: Infantry
- Engagements: American Civil War: Battle of Cold Harbor; Bermuda Hundred Campaign; Petersburg Campaign; Battle of the Crater; Battle of Boydton Plank Road; Third Battle of Petersburg; Appomattox Campaign; Battle of Appomattox Court House

The 23rd United States Colored Infantry was an infantry regiment that served in the Union Army during the American Civil War. The regiment was composed of African American enlisted men commanded by white officers and was authorized by the Bureau of Colored Troops which was created by the United States War Department on May 22, 1863.

== Service ==
The 23rd U.S. Colored Infantry was recruited in Washington, D.C. and Baltimore, Maryland and organized at Camp Casey, Virginia beginning November 23, 1863 for three-year service under the command of Colonel Cleaveland John Campbell. The regiment has the distinction of being the first African-American regiment to fight in organized combat against the Army of Northern Virginia on May 15, 1864 in a skirmish at the intersection of the Catharpin and Old Plank Roads in Virginia.

The regiment was attached to 2nd Brigade, 4th Division, IX Corps, Army of the Potomac, April - September 1864. 2nd Brigade, 3rd Division, IX Corps, to December 1864. 3rd Brigade, 3rd Division, XXV Corps, December 1865. 3rd Brigade, 1st Division, XXV Corps, and Department of Texas, to November 1865.

The 23rd U.S. Colored Infantry mustered out of service November 30, 1865.

== Detailed service ==
Campaign from the Rapidan to the James River, Va., May and June 1864. Guarding wagon trains of the Army of the Potomac through the Wilderness. Before Petersburg June 15–18. Siege of Petersburg and Richmond June 16, 1864 to April 2, 1865. Mine Explosion, Petersburg, July 30, 1864. Weldon Railroad August 18–21. Fort Sedgwick September 28. Poplar Grove Church September 29–30. Boydton Plank Road, Hatcher's Run, October 27–28. Bermuda Hundred December 13. Duty on the Bermuda Hundred front until March 1865. Appomattox Campaign March 28-April 9. Hatcher's Run March 29–31. Fall of Petersburg April 2. Pursuit of Lee April 3–9. Appomattox Court House April 9. Surrender of Lee and his army. Duty in the Department of Virginia until May. Moved to Texas May - June. Duty at Brownsville and along the Rio Grande River, Texas, until November.

== Casualties ==
The regiment lost a total of 252 men during service; 4 officers and 82 enlisted men killed or mortally wounded, 1 officer and 165 enlisted men died of disease.

== Commanders ==
- Colonel Cleaveland John Campbell - wounded in action at the Battle of the Crater; died of pneumonia while recovering from his wound
- Colonel Marshall Lamborn Dempcy

== See also ==
- List of United States Colored Troops Civil War Units
- United States Colored Troops
