= 151st New York Infantry Regiment =

- Active: October 22, 1862, to June 26, 1865
- Country: United States
- Allegiance: Union
- Branch: Infantry
- Engagements: Gettysburg campaign Bristoe Campaign; Battle of Mine Run; Battle of the Wilderness; Battle of Spotsylvania Court House; Battle of Totopotomoy Creek; Battle of Cold Harbor; Battle of Monocacy; Shenandoah Valley Campaign; Third Battle of Winchester; Battle of Cedar Creek; Siege of Petersburg; Appomattox Campaign; Battle of Sayler's Creek

The 151st New York Infantry Regiment was an infantry regiment in the Union Army during the American Civil War.

== Service ==
The 151st New York Infantry was organized at Lockport, New York, and mustered in for three years service on October 22, 1862, under the command of Colonel William Emerson.

The regiment was attached to the Defenses of Baltimore, Maryland, VIII Corps, Middle Department, to January 1863. 3rd Separate Brigade, VIII Corps, to June 1863. 3rd Provisional Brigade, French's Division, VIII Corps, to July 1863. 1st Brigade, 3rd Division, III Corps, Army of the Potomac, to April 1864. 1st Brigade, 3rd Division, VI Corps, Army of the Potomac and Army of the Shenandoah, to June 1865.

The 151st New York Infantry mustered out of service at Washington, D.C., on June 26, 1865.

== Detailed service ==
Left New York for Baltimore, Maryland, October 23, 1862. Duty at Baltimore, until April 22, 1863, and in the Middle Department until June. At South Mountain, Maryland, until July. Gettysburg Campaign. Pursuit of Lee to Manassas Gap, Virginia, July 5–24. Wapping Heights July 23. Duty on line of the Rappahannock and Rapidan to October. Bristoe Campaign October 9–22. McLean's Ford October 15. Advance to line of the Rappahannock November 7–8. Kelly's Ford November 7. Mine Run Campaign November 26 – December 2. Payne's Farm November 27. Mine Run November 28–30. Demonstration on the Rapidan February 6–7, 1864. Campaign from the Rapidan to the James May 3 – June 15. Battles of the Wilderness May 5–7; Spottsylvania May 8–12; Spottsylvania Court House May 12–21. Assault on the Salient, "Bloody Angle," May 12. North Anna River May 23–26. On line of the Pamunkey May 26–28. Totopotomoy May 28–31. Hanover Court House May 31. Cold Harbor June 1–12. Before Petersburg June 17–18. Siege of Petersburg June 17 to July 6. Jerusalem Plank Road, Weldon Railroad, June 22–23. Moved to Baltimore, Maryland, thence to Frederick, Maryland, July 6–8. Battle of Monocacy July 9. Sheridan's Shenandoah Valley Campaign August 7 – November 28. Battle of Winchester September 19. Fisher's Hill September 22. Battle of Cedar Creek October 19. Duty at Kernstown and Winchester until December. Moved to Washington, D.C., thence to Petersburg, Virginia, December 3–6. Siege of Petersburg December 12, 1864, to April 2, 1865. Fort Fisher, Petersburg, March 25, 1865. Appomattox Campaign March 28 – April 9. Fall of Petersburg April 2. Pursuit of Lee April 3–9. Sayler's Creek April 6. Appomattox Court House April 9. Surrender of Lee and his army. March to Danville April 23–27. Moved to Richmond, Virginia, May 16; thence to Washington, D.C., May 24 – June 2. Corps Review June 8.

== Casualties ==
The regiment lost a total of 206 men during service; 5 officers and 101 enlisted men killed or mortally wounded, 1 officer and 99 enlisted men died of disease.

== Commanders ==
- Colonel William Emerson
- Lieutenant Colonel Thomas M. Fay – commanded at the battle of the Wilderness

== See also ==
- List of New York Civil War regiments
- New York in the Civil War
