= Battery L, 1st New York Light Artillery =

- Active: September 1861 - June 17, 1865
- Country: United States of America
- Allegiance: Union
- Branch: Artillery
- Engagements: Battle of Cedar Mountain; Second Battle of Bull Run; Battle of Chantilly; Battle of South Mountain; Battle of Antietam; Battle of Fredericksburg; Battle of Chancellorsville; Battle of Gettysburg; Bristoe Campaign; Mine Run Campaign; Battle of Spotsylvania Court House; Battle of North Anna; Battle of Totopotomoy Creek; Battle of Cold Harbor; Siege of Petersburg; Battle of Globe Tavern; Appomattox Campaign; Third Battle of Petersburg

Battery L, 1st New York Light Artillery ("Rochester Union Grays") was an artillery battery that served in the Union Army during the American Civil War.

== Service ==
The battery was organized at Rochester, New York and mustered in for a three-year enlistment on November 17, 1861 under the command of Captain John A. Reynolds.

The battery was attached to Defenses of Washington, D.C., to February 1862. Baltimore, Maryland, Dix's Command, to May 1862. 1st Brigade, Sigel's Division, Department of the Shenandoah, to June 1862. 1st Division, III Corps, Army of Virginia, to September 1862. 1st Division, I Corps, Army of the Potomac, to May 1863. Artillery Brigade, I Corps, to March 1864. Artillery Brigade, V Corps, to March 1865. Artillery Reserve, Army of the Potomac, attached to IX Corps, to April 1865. Artillery Brigade, V Corps, to June 1865.

Battery L, 1st New York Light Artillery mustered out of service on June 17, 1865.

== Detailed service ==
Moved to Elmira, N.Y., and mustered in. Left New York for Washington, D.C., November 21, 1861. Duty at Camp Barry, defenses of Washington, until February 1862, and at Baltimore, Md., until May 1862. Moved to Winchester, Va. Skirmish at Charlestown May 28. Defense of Harpers Ferry, Va., May 28–30. Battle of Cedar Mountain, Va., August 9. Pope's Campaign in northern Virginia August 16-September 2. Fords of the Rappahannock August 21–23. Sulphur Springs August 26. Battles of Gainesville August 28, Groveton August 29. Second Battle of Bull Run August 30. Battle of Chantilly September 1. Maryland Campaign September 6–22. Battle of South Mountain September 14. Battle of Antietam September 16–17. Movement to Falmouth, Va., October 29-November 19. Battle of Fredericksburg, Va., December 12–15. "Mud March" January 20–24, 1863. Duty at Falmouth and Belle Plains until April. Chancellorsville Campaign April 27-May 6. Operations at Pollock's Mill Creek April 29-May 2. Fitzhugh's Crossing April 29–30. Battle of Chancellorsville May 1–5. Gettysburg Campaign June 11-July 24. Battle of Gettysburg July 1–3. On line of the Rappahannock and Rapidan until October. Bristoe Campaign October 9–22. Advance to line of the Rappahannock November 7–8. Mine Run Campaign November 26-December 2. Demonstration on the Rapidan February 6–7, 1864. Campaign from the Rapidan to the James May 3-June 15. Battle of the Wilderness May 5–7. Laurel Hill May 8. Spotsylvania May 8–12. Battle of Spotsylvania Court House May 12–21. Assault on the Salient May 12. North Anna River May 23–26. Jericho Ford May 23. On line of the Pamunkey May 26–28. Totopotomoy May 28–31. Cold Harbor June 1–12. Bethesda Church June 1–3. Before Petersburg June 16–18. Siege of Petersburg June 16, 1864 to April 2, 1865. Weldon Railroad August 18–21, 1864. Dabney's Mills, Hatcher's Run, February 5–7, 1865. Appomattox Campaign March 28-April 9. Assault on and fall of Petersburg April 2. Pursuit of Lee April 3–9. Moved to Washington, D.C. Grand Review of the Armies May 23.

== Casualties ==
The battery lost a total of 23 men during service; 11 enlisted men killed or mortally wounded, 12 enlisted men died of disease.

== Commanders ==
- Captain John A. Reynolds
- Captain Gilbert H. Reynolds
- Captain George Breck - commanded at the Battle of Gettysburg while still at the rank of 1st lieutenant after Cpt Gilbert Reynolds was wounded in action on July 1

== See also ==
- List of New York Civil War regiments
- New York in the Civil War
