= 108th New York Infantry Regiment =

- Active: August 18, 1862 – May 28, 1865
- Country: United States
- Allegiance: Union
- Type: Infantry
- Engagements: Battle of Antietam; Battle of Fredericksburg; Battle of Chancellorsville; Battle of Gettysburg; Bristoe Campaign; Mine Run Campaign; Battle of the Wilderness; Battle of Spotsylvania Court House; Battle of Cold Harbor; Siege of Petersburg; Second Battle of Petersburg; First Battle of Deep Bottom; Second Battle of Deep Bottom; Second Battle of Ream's Station; Battle of Hatcher's Run; Appomattox Campaign; Battle of Sailor's Creek

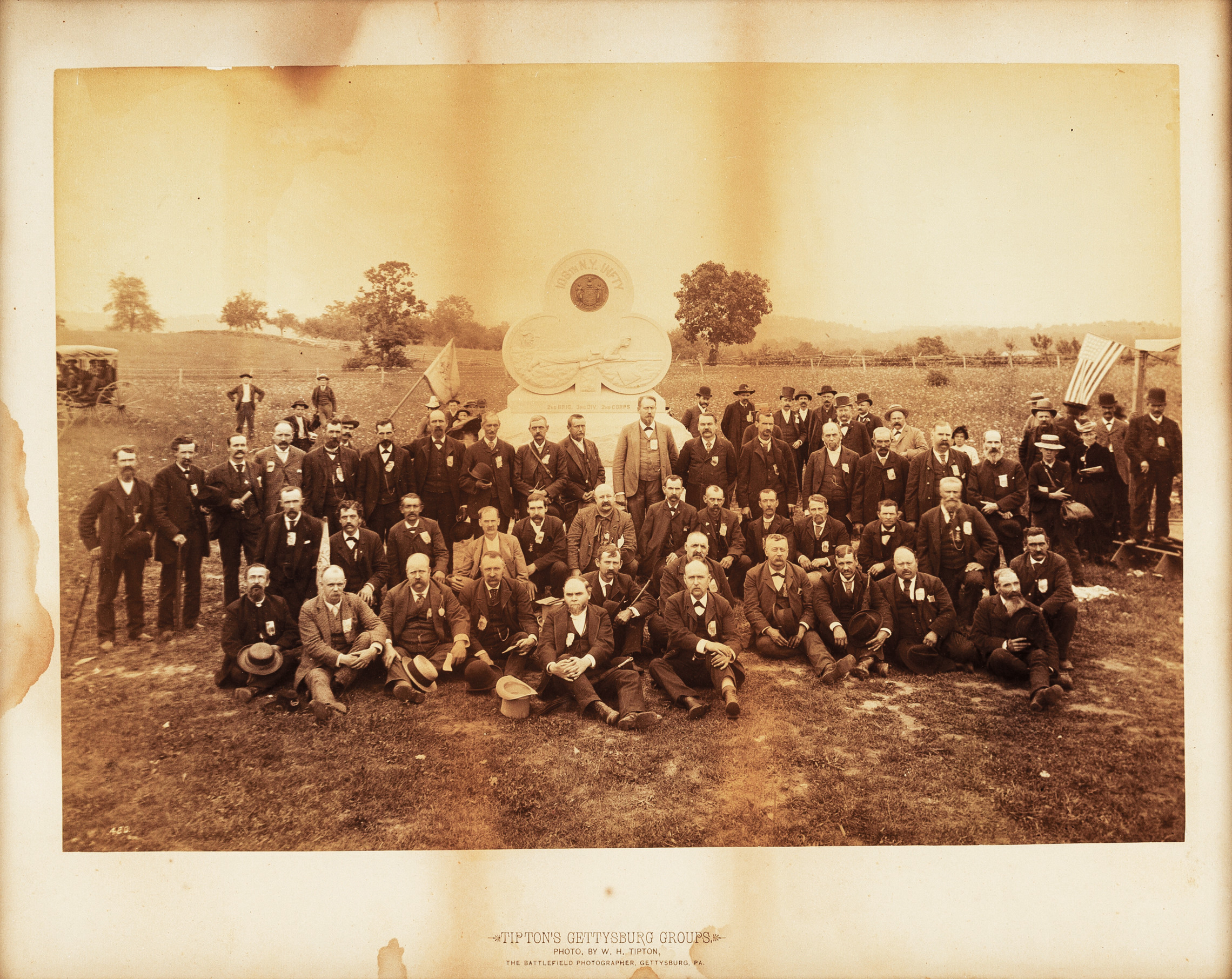
Regimental reunion in 1888.

The 108th New York Infantry Regiment was an infantry regiment in the Union Army during the American Civil War.

== Formation ==
The 108th New York Infantry was organized at Camp Fitz John Porter in Rochester, New York, and mustered in for three years service on August 18, 1862, under the command of Colonel Oliver Hazard Palmer.

The regiment was attached to Whipple's Command, Defenses of Washington, D.C., to September 1862. 2nd Brigade, 3rd Division, II Corps, Army of the Potomac, to March 1864. 3rd Brigade, 2nd Division, II Corps, to May 1865.

The 108th New York Infantry mustered out of service on May 28, 1865. Veterans and recruits were transferred to the 59th New York Infantry.

== Detailed service ==
Moved to New York City August 19, then to Washington, D.C., August 22, 1862. Maryland Campaign September 6–22, 1862. Battle of Antietam, Md., September 16–17. (Regiment lost 196 killed and wounded in its first battle.) Duty at Harpers Ferry, Va., September 22 to October 30. Reconnaissance to Charleston October 16–17. Advance up Loudoun Valley and movement to Falmouth, Va., October 30 – November 17. Battle of Fredericksburg, Va., December 12–15. At Falmouth until April 27, 1863. "Mud March" January 20–24. Chancellorsville Campaign April 27 – May 6. Battle of Chancellorsville May 1–5. Gettysburg Campaign June 11 – July 24. Battle of Gettysburg July 1–3. Pursuit of Lee to Manassas Gap, Va., July 5–24. Duty along Orange & Alexandria Railroad until September 12. Advance from the Rappahannock to the Rapidan September 13–17. Picket duty on the Rapidan until October 8. Bristoe Campaign October 8–22. Auburn and Bristoe October 14. Advance to line of the Rappahannock November 7–8. Mine Run Campaign November 26 – December 2. At Stevensburg until May, 1864. Demonstration on the Rapidan February 6–7. Morton's Ford February 6–7. Campaign from the Rapidan to the James May 1 – June 15. Battles of the Wilderness May 5–7. Laurel Hill May 8. Spotsylvania May 8–12. Po River May 10. Spotsylvania Court House May 12–21. Assault on the Salient or "Bloody Angle" May 12. North Anna River May 23–26. On line of the Pamunkey May 26–28. Totopotomoy May 28–31. Cold Harbor June 1–12. Before Petersburg June 16–18. Siege of Petersburg June 16, 1864, to April 2, 1865. Jerusalem Plank Road June 22–23, 1864. Demonstration north of the James July 27–29. Deep Bottom July 27–28. Demonstration north of the James August 13–20. Strawberry Plains, Deep Bottom, August 14–18. Ream's Station August 25. Boydton Plank Road, Hatcher's Run, October 27–28. Dabney's Mills, Hatcher's Run, February 5–7, 1865. Appomattox Campaign March 28 – April 9. Boydton and White Oak Roads March 29–31. Crow's House March 31. Fall of Petersburg April 2. Sailor's Creek April 6. High Bridge and Farmville April 7. Appomattox Court House April 9. Surrender of Lee and his army. At Burkesville until May 2. March to Washington, D.C., May 2–12. Grand Review of the Armies May 23.

== Casualties ==
The regiment lost a total of 191 men during service; 9 officers and 95 enlisted men killed or mortally wounded, 87 enlisted men died of disease.

== Commanders ==
- Colonel Oliver Hazard Palmer
- Colonel Charles James Powers - commanded at the Battle of Fredericksburg while still at the rank of lieutenant colonel
- Colonel Francis Edwin Pierce - commanded at the Battle of Gettysburg while still at the rank of lieutenant colonel

== Notable members ==
- Corporal William H. Raymond, Company A - Medal of Honor recipient for action at the Battle of Gettysburg, July 3, 1863
- Private Henry Niles, Company K - captured the colors of the 14th North Carolina Infantry at the Battle of Antietam

== See also ==
- List of New York Civil War regiments
- New York in the Civil War
