= 12th New York Light Artillery =

12th Independent Battery, New York Volunteer Light Artillery
- Active: January 14, 1862 to June 14, 1865
- Country: United States
- Allegiance: Union
- Branch: Artillery
- Engagements: Bristoe Campaign; Mine Run Campaign; Battle of Spotsylvania Court House; Battle of Cold Harbor; Siege of Petersburg; Battle of Jerusalem Plank Road; First Battle of Deep Bottom; Second Battle of Ream's Station; Appomattox Campaign

The 12th Independent Battery, New York Volunteer Light Artillery was an artillery battery that served in the Union Army during the American Civil War.

== Service ==
The battery was organized at Albany, New York and mustered in for a three-year enlistment on January 14, 1862 under the command of Captain William H. Ellis.

The battery was attached to Whipple's Brigade, Wadsworth's Command, Military District of Washington, to February 1863. XXII Corps, Department of Washington, to July 1863. Artillery Brigade, III Corps, Army of the Potomac, to March 1864. 2nd Brigade, Artillery Reserve, Army of the Potomac, to May 18, 1864. Artillery Brigade, II Corps, to September 1864. Artillery Reserve, Army of the Potomac, to June 1865.

The 12th New York Light Artillery mustered out of service on June 14, 1865 at Albany, New York.

== Detailed service ==
Moved to Washington, D.C., January 17, 1862. Duty at Artillery Camp, defenses of Washington, D. C., to February 1863, and in the defenses of Washington, until July. Pursuit of Lee July 6–24. Wapping Heights, Va., July 23. On line of the Rappahannock till October. Bristoe Campaign October 9–22. Auburn and Bristoe October 14. Advance to line of the Rappahannock November 7–8. Kelly's Ford November 7. Mine Run Campaign November 26-December 2. Payne's Farm November 27. Mine Run November 28–30. Rapidan Campaign May 3-June 15, 1864. Battle of the Wilderness May 5–7. Spotsylvania May 8–12. Spotsylvania Court House May 12–21. Harris Farm or Fredericksburg Road May 19. North Anna River May 23–26. On line of the Pamunkey May 26–28. Totopotomoy May 28–31. Cold Harbor June 1–12. Before Petersburg June 16–18. Siege of Petersburg June 16, 1864 to April 2, 1865. Jerusalem Plank Road, Weldon Railroad, June 22–23, 1864. Demonstration on north side of the James River July 27–29. Deep Bottom July 27–28. Ream's Station August 25. Appomattox Campaign March 28-April 9, 1865. Assault and capture of Petersburg April 2. Moved to Washington, May. Grand Review of the Armies May 23.

== Casualties ==
The battery lost a total of 19 men during service; 1 officer and 4 enlisted men killed or mortally wounded, 14 enlisted men died of disease.

== Commanders ==
- Captain William H. Ellis - dismissed February 23, 1863
- Captain George F. McKnight - discharged December 26, 1864
- Captain Charles A. Clark
- Lieutenant George K. Dauchy - commanded during the Bristoe and Mine Run campaigns

== See also ==
- List of New York Civil War regiments
- New York in the Civil War
