= 5th U.S. Artillery, Battery A =

- Active: 1861–1865
- Country: United States
- Allegiance: (United States) Union
- Branch: Union Army
- Type: Field Artillery
- Size: Battery
- Equipment: 4 10-pounder Parrott rifles and 2 12-pounder Napoleons (Apr. 1862); 6 12-pounder Napoleons (Sep. 1862)
- Engagements: American Civil War; Siege of Yorktown (1862); Seven Days Battles (1862); Battle of Antietam (1862); Battle of Fredericksburg (1862); Battle of Suffolk (1863); Siege of Suffolk (1863); Bermuda Hundred campaign (1864); Battle of Cold Harbor (1864); Second Battle of Petersburg (1864); Battle of Chaffin's Farm (1864); Siege of Petersburg (1864–65); Appomattox campaign (1865)

Commanders
- Notable commanders: George W. Getty; Adelbert Ames

The 5th U.S. Artillery, Battery A was an artillery battery that served in the Union Army during the American Civil War. The unit fought at Yorktown, the Seven Days, Antietam, and Fredericksburg in 1862. The battery fought at Norfleet House and Suffolk in 1863 and at Bermuda Hundred, Cold Harbor, the Petersburg assault, Chaffin's Farm, the Petersburg siege, and the Appomattox campaign in 1864–1865.

== Service ==
Organized and equipped July 1861. Attached to Artillery Reserve, Army Potomac, March to May 1862. 2nd Brigade, Horse Artillery, Artillery Reserve, 5th Army Corps, Army Potomac, to September 1862. Artillery, 3rd Division, 9th Army Corps, Army Potomac, to April 1863. Artillery, 2nd Division, 7th Army Corps, Dept. of Virginia, to July 1863. U.S. Forces, Portsmouth, Va., Dept. Virginia and North Carolina, to April 1864. Artillery, 1st Division, 18th Army Corps, Army of the James, to June 1864. Artillery Brigade, 18th Army Corps, to December 1864. Artillery Brigade, 24th Army Corps, to May 1864. Dept. of Virginia, to August 1865.

== History ==
Duty in the Defenses of Washington, D. C., until March 1862. Mouth of Mattawoman Creek, Md., November 14, 1861. Ordered to the Virginia Peninsula March 1862. Peninsula Campaign April to August. Siege of Yorktown April 5–May 4. Seven days before Richmond June 25–July 1. Gaines' Mill June 27. Golding's Farm June 28. Malvern Hill July 1. At Harrison's Landing until August 16. Moved to Alexandria, Va., August 16–23. Maryland Campaign September 6–22. Battle of Antietam, Md., September 16–17. Movement to Falmouth, Va., October 30–November 17. Battle of Fredericksburg, Va., December 12–15. "Mud March" January 20–24, 1863. Moved to Newport News, Va., February, thence to Suffolk, Va., March. Siege of Suffolk April 11–May 4. Norfleet House April 15. Dix's Peninsula Campaign June 24–July 8. Expedition from White House to South Anna River July 1–7. Duty at Portsmouth, Va., until April 1864. Butler's operations on south side of the James River and against Petersburg and Richmond May 4–28. Swift Creek or Arrowfield Church May 9–10. Operations against Fort Darling May 12–16. Battle of Drury's Bluff May 14–16. On Bermuda Hundred front May 16–28. Movement to Cold Harbor May 28–June 1. Battles about Cold Harbor June 1–12. Assaults on Petersburg June 15–18. Siege operations against Petersburg and Richmond June 16, 1864, to April 2, 1865. Battle of Chaffin's Farm, New Market Heights, September 28–30. Occupation of Richmond April 3, 1865. Duty at Richmond and Lynchburg, Va., until August 1865.

== Commanders ==
- George W. Getty: (1861)
- Adelbert Ames: (Seven Days)
- Charles P. Muhlenberg: (Antietam, Bermuda Hundred, Petersburg, Appomattox)
- James Gilliss: (Fredericksburg)
- James E. Wilson (Cold Harbor)

== See also ==
- List of United States Regular Army Civil War units
