= Battery G, 1st New York Light Artillery =

- Active: September 24, 1861 to June 19, 1865
- Country: United States
- Allegiance: Union
- Branch: Artillery
- Engagements: Siege of Yorktown; Battle of Seven Pines; Seven Days Battles; Battle of Malvern Hill; Battle of Antietam; Battle of Fredericksburg; Battle of Chancellorsville; Battle of Gettysburg; Bristoe Campaign; Mine Run Campaign; Battle of Spotsylvania Court House; Battle of Cold Harbor; Siege of Petersburg; First Battle of Deep Bottom; Second Battle of Deep Bottom; Battle of Fort Stedman; Appomattox Campaign

Battery G, 1st New York Light Artillery was an artillery battery that served in the Union Army during the American Civil War.

== Service ==
The battery was organized at Elmira, New York and mustered in for a three-year enlistment on September 24, 1861 under the command of Captain John D. Frank.

The battery was attached to Sumner's Division, Army of the Potomac, November 1861 to March 1862. Richardson's 1st Division, II Corps, Army of the Potomac, to May 1862. Unattached, Artillery Reserve, V Corps, to June 1862. Reserve Artillery, II Corps, to November 1862. Artillery, 3rd Division, II Corps, to May 1863. 1st Volunteer Brigade, Artillery Reserve, Army of the Potomac, to June 1863. 4th Volunteer Brigade, Artillery Reserve, Army of the Potomac, to August 1863. Artillery Brigade, II Corps, to September 1864. Artillery Reserve, attached to II Corps, to January 1865. Artillery Reserve, attached to IX Corps, to June 1865.

Battery G, 1st New York Light Artillery mustered out of service on June 19, 1865.

== Detailed service ==
Left New York for Washington, D.C., October 31, 1861. Duty at Camp Barry, defenses of Washington, D.C., November 1861 to March 1862. Advance on Manassas, Va., March 10–15, 1862. Operations on Orange & Alexandria Railroad March 28–31. Bealeton Station March 28. Warrenton Junction March 29. Rappahannock Station March 29. Moved to the Virginia Peninsula April 3. Siege of Yorktown April 5-May 4. Battle of Seven Pines or Fair Oaks May 31-June 1. Seven days before Richmond June 25-July 1. Fair Oaks June 27. Savage Station June 29. White Oak Swamp and Glendale June 30. Malvern Hill July 1. At Harrison's Landing until August 16. Movement to Fort Monroe, then to Centreville August 15–30. Maryland Campaign September 6–22. Battle of Antietam September 16–17. Duty at Harpers Ferry, Va., September 22-October 29. Reconnaissance to Leesburg October 1–2. Leesburg October 1. Reconnaissance to Charlestown October 16–17. Advance up Loudoun Valley and movement to Falmouth, Va., October 29-November 19. Snicker's Gap November 2. Falmouth November 17. Battle of Fredericksburg December 12–15. "Mud March" January 20–24, 1863. At Falmouth until April. Chancellorsville Campaign April 27-May 6. Battle of Chancellorsville May 1–5. Battle of Gettysburg, July 1–3. On line of the Rappahannock and Rapidan until October. Bristoe Campaign October 9–22. Auburn and Bristoe Station October 14. Advance to line of the Rappahannock November 7–8. Mine Run Campaign November 26-December 2. At Stevensburg until May 1864. Campaign from the Rapidan to the James May 3-June 15. Battle of the Wilderness May 5–7. Spotsylvania May 8–12. Po River May 10. Spotsylvania Court House May 12–21. "Bloody Angle," Assault on the Salient, May 12. North Anna River May 23–26. On line of the Pamunkey May 26–28. Totopotomoy May 28–31. Hanover Court House May 30. Cold Harbor June 1–12. Before Petersburg June 16–18. Siege of Petersburg June 16, 1864 to April 2, 1865. Jerusalem Plank Road, Weldon Railroad, June 22–23, 1864. Deep Bottom July 27–28. Mine Explosion, Petersburg, July 30 (reserve). Demonstration north of the James River August 13–20. Deep Bottom, Strawberry Plains, August 14–18. Fort Stedman March 25, 1865. Appomattox Campaign March 28- April 9. Assault on and fall of Petersburg April 2. Moved to Washington May. Grand Review of the Armies May 23.

== Casualties ==
The battery lost a total of 30 men during service; 1 officer and 11 enlisted men killed or mortally wounded, 2 officers and 16 enlisted men died of disease.

== Commanders ==
- Captain John D. Frank - discharged April 4, 1863 due to ill health
- Captain Nelson Ames - discharged October 15, 1864
- Captain Samuel A. McClellan

== See also ==
- List of New York Civil War regiments
- New York in the Civil War
