= 184th Pennsylvania Infantry Regiment =

Union Army infantry regiment

184th Pennsylvania Volunteer Infantry
- Active: May 1864 – July 14, 1865
- Country: United States of America
- Allegiance: Union
- Branch: Infantry
- Engagements: Battle of Totopotomoy Creek; Battle of Cold Harbor; Siege of Petersburg; Second Battle of Petersburg; First Battle of Deep Bottom; Second Battle of Deep Bottom; Second Battle of Ream's Station; Battle of Boydton Plank Road; Battle of Hatcher's Run; Appomattox Campaign; Battle of White Oak Road; Battle of Sutherland's Station; Battle of Sailor's Creek; Battle of High Bridge; Battle of Appomattox Court House

The 184th Pennsylvania Volunteer Infantry was an infantry regiment that served in the Union Army during the American Civil War.

== Service ==
The 184th Pennsylvania Infantry was organized at Harrisburg, Pennsylvania in May 1864 and mustered in under the command of Colonel John Hubler Stover.

The regiment was attached to 1st Brigade, 2nd Division, II Corps, Army of the Potomac.

On July 14, 1865, the 184th Pennsylvania Infantry was mustered out of service.

== Detailed service ==
Ordered to join Army of the Potomac in the field, and reported May 28, 1864. Rapidan Campaign May 28-June 12. Totopotomoy May 28–31. Cold Harbor June 1–12. Before Petersburg June 16–18. Siege of Petersburg June 16, 1864 to April 2, 1865. Jerusalem Plank Road, Weldon Railroad, June 22–23, 1864. Demonstration on north side of the James at Deep Bottom July 27–29. Deep Bottom July 27–28. Mine Explosion, Petersburg, July 30 (reserve). Demonstration north of the James at Deep Bottom August 13–20. Strawberry Plains, Deep Bottom, August 14–18. Ream's Station August 25. Boydton Plank Road, Hatcher's Run, October 27–28. Reconnaissance to Hatcher's Run December 9–10. Dabney's Mills, Hatcher's Run, February 5–7, 1865. Watkins' House March 25. Appomattox Campaign March 28-April 9. Boydton and White Oak Roads March 30–31. Crow's House March 31. Sailor's Creek April 6. High Bridge and Farmville April 7. Appomattox Court House April 9. Surrender of Lee and his army. March to Washington, D.C., May 2–12. Grand Review of the Armies May 23.

== Casualties ==
The regiment lost a total of 235 men during service; 3 officers and 110 enlisted men killed or mortally wounded, 122 enlisted men died of disease.

== Commanders ==
- Colonel John Hubler Stover

== See also ==
- List of Pennsylvania Civil War Units
- Pennsylvania in the Civil War
