= 190th Pennsylvania Infantry Regiment =

Union Army infantry regiment

190th Pennsylvania Volunteer Infantry
- Active: May 31, 1864 – June 28, 1865
- Country: United States of America
- Allegiance: Union
- Branch: Infantry
- Engagements: Battle of Cold Harbor; Siege of Petersburg; Battle of Peebles' Farm; Battle of Boydton Plank Road; Battle of Globe Tavern; Battle of Hatcher's Run; Appomattox Campaign; Battle of Lewis's Farm; Battle of White Oak Road; Battle of Five Forks; Battle of Appomattox Court House

The 190th Pennsylvania Volunteer Infantry was an infantry regiment that served in the Union Army during the American Civil War.

== Service ==
The 190th Pennsylvania Infantry was organized while on campaign in Virginia from veterans and recruits of the Pennsylvania Reserves and mustered in May 31, 1864 under the command of Colonel William Ross Hartshorne.

The regiment was attached to 3rd Brigade, 3rd Division, V Corps, Army of the Potomac, to August 1864. 1st Brigade, 3rd Division, V Corps, to September 1864. 3rd Brigade, 2nd Division, V Corps, to June 1865.

The 190th Pennsylvania Infantry mustered out of service on June 28, 1865.

== Detailed service ==
Battles about Cold Harbor, Va., June 1–12, 1864. Bethesda Church June 1–3. White Oak Swamp Bridge June 13. Before Petersburg June 16–18. Siege of Petersburg June 16, 1864 to April 2, 1865. Weldon Railroad June 21–23, 1864. Mine Explosion, Petersburg, July 30 (reserve). Weldon Railroad August 18–21. Poplar Springs Church September 29 – October 2. Boydton Plank Road, Hatcher's Run, October 27–28. Warren's Expedition to Weldon Railroad December 7–12. Dabney's Mills, Hatcher's Run, February 5–7, 1865. Appomattox Campaign March 28 – April 9. Lewis Farm, near Gravelly Run, March 29. White Oak Road March 31. Five Forks April 1. Appomattox Court House April 9. Surrender of Lee and his army. Marched to Washington, D.C., May 1–12. Grand Review of the Armies May 23.

== Casualties ==
The regiment lost a total of 214 men during service; 3 officers and 43 enlisted men killed or mortally wounded, 168 enlisted men died of disease.

== Commanders ==
- Colonel William Ross Hartshorne
- Lieutenant Colonel Joseph B. Pattee – commanded after most of the regiment was captured in action at the Battle of Hatcher's Run

== See also ==
- List of Pennsylvania Civil War Units
- Pennsylvania in the Civil War
