= 98th New York Infantry Regiment =

- Active: February 1, 1862, to August 31, 1865
- Country: United States
- Allegiance: Union
- Branch: Union Army
- Role: Infantry
- Size: Regiment
- Part of: IV Corps, Army of the Potomac
- Nickname(s): "Malone and Lyons Regiment"
- Campaigns: American Civil War: Peninsula Campaign; Siege of Yorktown; Battle of Williamsburg; Battle of Seven Pines; Battle of White Oak Swamp; Battle of Malvern Hill; Battle of Washington; Bermuda Hundred Campaign; Battle of Swift Creek; Battle of Proctor's Creek; Overland Campaign; Battle of Cold Harbor; Petersburg Campaign; Second Battle of Petersburg; Battle of Chaffin's Farm; Battle of Fair Oaks & Darbytown Road

Commanders
- Notable commanders: Colonel William Dutton; Colonel Charles Durkee; Colonel Frederick F. Wead; Lieutenant Colonel William Kreutzer

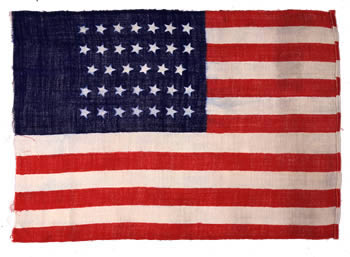
98th Regiment NY Infantry Camp Colors

The 98th New York Infantry Regiment was a unit of the Union Army during the American Civil War.

== History ==
=== Regimental Organization ===
Company A – recruited principally in Franklin County
Company B – recruited principally in Franklin County
Company C – recruited principally in Franklin County
Company D – recruited principally in Franklin County
Company E – recruited principally in Franklin County
Company F – recruited principally in Wayne County
Company G – recruited principally in Franklin County
Company H – recruited principally in Franklin County
Company I – recruited principally in Wayne County
Company K – recruited principally in Wayne County

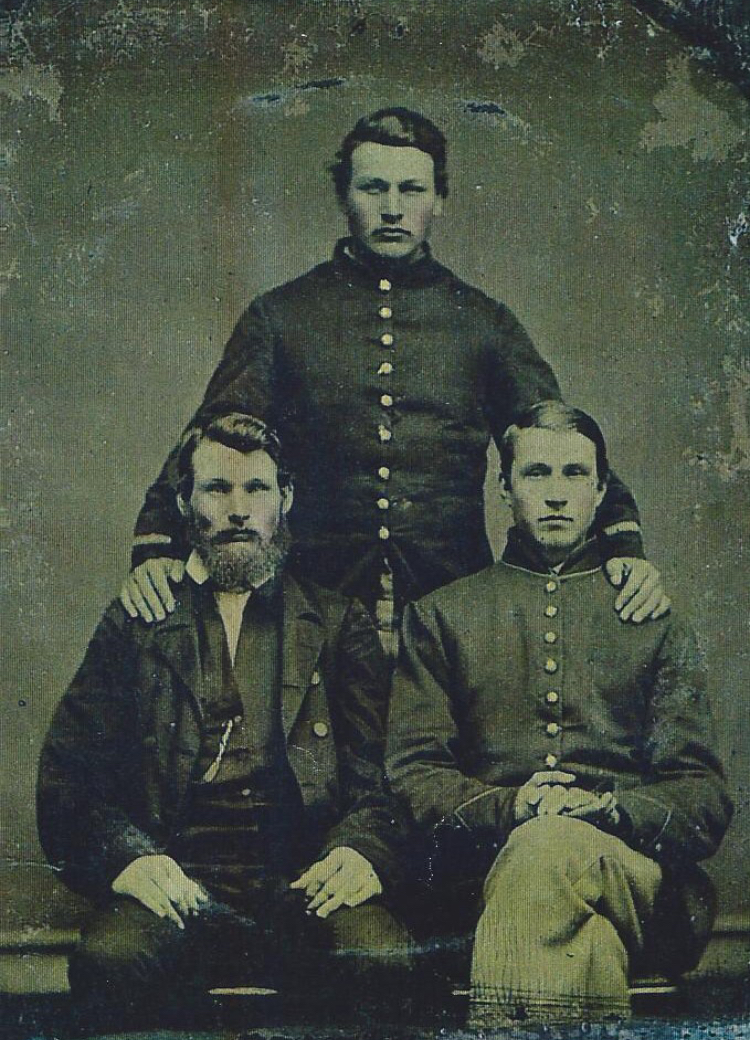
Private William Slack (standing) and Private John Slack (sitting, right), 98th New York Infantry. Both born in North Dundas, Ontario and both wounded at Cold Harbor in 1864. William Slack died of his wounds.

=== Time Line ===
Date	Event
January 25-February 8, 1862	Companies A, B, C, D, E, G and H organized at Malone, N.Y. and companies F, I and K organized at Lyons, N.Y. Organization completed at Albany, N.Y.
March 8, 1862	Left State for Washington, D.C. under Colonel William Dutton, Lieutenant Colonel Charles Durkee and Major Albon Mann
March 28, 1862	Moved to the Virginia Peninsula and attached to 3rd Brigade, 3rd Division, 4th Army Corps, Army of the Potomac
April 5-May 4, 1862	Siege of Yorktown, Va.
April 29, 1862	Reconnaissance toward Lee's Mills
May 5, 1862	Battle of Williamsburg
May 21–23, 1862	Operations about Bottom's Bridge
May 24–27, 1862	Reconnaissance to Seven Pines
May 24, 1862	Chickahominy, near Savage Station, and Seven Pines
May 31-June 1, 1862	Battle of Seven Pines or Fair Oaks
	The regiment lost 11 men killed, 3 officers and 31 men wounded, and 26 men missing.
June 1862	Assigned to 2nd Brigade, 2nd Division, 4th Army Corps
June 25-July 1, 1862	Seven days before Richmond
June 30, 1862	White Oak Swamp
July 1, 1862	Malvern Hill
July 1862	At Harrison's Landing. Assigned to 1st Brigade, 2nd Division, 4th Army Corps. Colonel Dutton died of typhus fever. Lieutenant Colonel Durkee was promoted to colonel and took over the regiment.
August 16–23, 1862	Moved to Fortress Monroe
September 18, 1862	Duty at Yorktown
December 25, 1862	Moved to Morehead City, N. C. and assigned to Naglee's Brigade, Dept. of North Carolina
January 1–21, 1863	At Carolina City and assigned to 1st Brigade, 2nd Division, 18th Army Corps, Dept. of North Carolina
January 28–31, 1863	Moved to Port Royal Harbor, S.C.
February 10-April 3, 1863	At St. Helena Island, S.C., assigned to 1st Brigade, 1st Division, 18th Army Corps, Dept. of the South. Colonel Durkee resigned, and Lieutenant Colonel Frederick M. Wead was promoted to colonel and took command of the regiment.
April 3–11, 1863	Expedition against Charleston, S.C. assigned to District of Beaufort, N. C., Dept. of North Carolina
April 12–15, 1863	Moved to New Berne, N. C.
April 17–21, 1863	Expedition to relief of Little Washington and duty in the District of Beaufort, N. C.
October 16–18, 1863	Moved to Newport News, Va. attached to Newport News, Va., Dept. of Virginia and North Carolina
December 1863	At Portsmouth, Va.
January 1864	District of the Currituck, Dept. of Virginia and North Carolina
March–April 1864	Veterans on furlough
March 1864	Assigned to 1st Brigade, Heckman's Division, 18th Army Corps
April 26, 1864	Moved to Yorktown, Va. and assigned to 1st Brigade, 1st Division, 18th Army Corps, Army of the James
May 3–28, 1864	Butler's operations on south side of the James River and against Petersburg and Richmond
	The regiment lost 1 officer and 21 men killed or mortally wounded, 3 officers and 57 men wounded, and 12 men missing.
May 5, 1864	Occupation of City Point and Bermuda Hundred
May 8–10, 1864	Swift Creek or Arrowfield Church
May 12–16, 1864	Operations against Fort Darling
May 14–16, 1864	Battle of Drewry's Bluff
May 16–28, 1864	Bermuda Hundred
May 27–31, 1864	Moved to White House, thence to Cold Harbor
June 1–12, 1864	Battles about Cold Harbor
	Colonel Wead, 1 other officer and 30 enlisted men were killed or mortally wounded, 2 officers and 77 men wounded, and 3 men missing. Lieutenant Colonel William Kreutzer was commissioned as colonel, but the regiment did not have sufficient manpower for him to muster in.
June 15–18, 1864	Before Petersburg
	The regiment lost 1 officer and 14 men killed or mortally wounded and 40 enlisted men wounded.
June 18, 1864	Siege operations against Petersburg and Richmond begin
July 30, 1864	Mine Explosion, Petersburg (Reserve)
August–September 1864	Duty in the trenches before Petersburg and on the Bermuda Hundred front
September 28–30, 1864	Battle of Chaffin's Farm, New Market Heights
	The regiment lost 19 enlisted men killed or mortally wounded, 4 officers and 42 men wounded, and 1 man missing.
October 27–28, 1864	Battle of Fair Oaks
	The regiment lost 3 men wounded.
November 2–17, 1864	Detached for duty in New York during Presidential election of 1864
November 1864	Duty in trenches north of James and before Richmond
December 1864	Assigned to 1st Brigade, 3rd Division, 24th Army Corps
April 1865	Assigned to 2nd Brigade, 3rd Division, 24th Army Corps
April 3, 1865	Occupation of Richmond and Provost duty in Richmond and in the Dept. of Virginia
July 1865	Assigned to 2nd Independent Brigade, 24th Army Corps
August 31, 1865	Mustered out at Richmond, Va. under Colonel Frederick F. Wead, Lieutenant Colonel William Kreutzer and Major William H. Rogers

=== Regiment losses ===
The 98th New York Infantry Regiment lost:

by death and killed in action: 2 officers and 61 enlisted men
of wounds received in action: 2 officers and 37 enlisted men
of disease and other causes: 4 officers and 132 enlisted men
total: 8 officers and 230 enlisted men
aggregate: 238 of whom 22 enlisted men died in the hands of the enemy

== See also ==
- New York in the American Civil War
- List of New York Civil War regiments
