= 8th Maryland Infantry Regiment =

Military unit on the Union side during the American Civil War

The 8th Maryland Infantry was a Union Army regiment that fought in the American Civil War.

== History ==
The regiment was organized at Baltimore, Maryland, in August, 1862, under command of Colonel Andrew W. Denison. It moved to the Antietam Creek near Sharpsburg, Maryland, on September 18, 1862, and was attached to Kenly's Maryland Brigade, VIII Corps, Middle Department. It was moved around to various commands and posts within the VIII Corps until July 1863, when it was attached to the 3rd Brigade, 3rd Division, I Corps, Army of the Potomac.

In March 1864, the 8th was transferred to the V Corps. The unit fought throughout the Overland Campaign and the Siege of Petersburg. It participated in the Appomattox Campaign. After marching in the Grand Review of the Armies in Washington, D.C., it was mustered out May 31, 1865.

== Casualties ==
- Killed and mortally wounded: 3 officers, 54 enlisted men
- Died of disease: 0 officers, 70 enlisted men
- Wounded: ? officers, ? enlisted men
- Captured or missing: ? officers, ? enlisted men

Source: The Civil War in Maryland - 8th Maryland Volunteer Infantry
