= 2nd Pennsylvania Cavalry Regiment =

Union Army cavalry regiment

2nd Pennsylvania Cavalry
- Active: September 1861 – June 17, 1865
- Country: United States of America
- Allegiance: Union
- Branch: Cavalry
- Engagements: Battle of Cedar Mountain; Second Battle of Bull Run; Battle of Chantilly; Battle of Antietam; Battle of Gettysburg; Bristoe Campaign; Mine Run Campaign; Battle of the Wilderness; Battle of Todd's Tavern; Battle of Yellow Tavern; Battle of Cold Harbor; Battle of Trevilian Station; Battle of Jerusalem Plank Road; First Battle of Deep Bottom; Battle of Hatcher's Run; Battle of Appomattox Court House

The 2nd Pennsylvania Cavalry (59th Volunteers) was a cavalry regiment that served in the Union Army during the American Civil War.

== Service ==
The 2nd Pennsylvania Cavalry was organized in Harrisburg and Philadelphia, Pennsylvania , beginning in September 1861 as the "59th Volunteers" and mustered in for three years' service under the command of Colonel Richard Butler Price.

The regiment was attached to Sturgis' Command, Military District of Washington, to August 1862. John Buford's Cavalry Brigade, II Corps, Army of Virginia, to September 1862. Price's Cavalry Brigade, Defenses of Washington, to March 1863. 2nd Brigade, Stahel's Cavalry Division, XXII Corps, to June 1863. Provost Guard, Army of the Potomac, to December 1863. 2nd Brigade, 2nd Division, Cavalry Corps, Army of the Potomac, to February 1865. Provost Guard, Army of the Potomac, to June 1865.

The 2nd Pennsylvania Cavalry ceased to exist on June 17, 1865, when it was consolidated with the 20th Pennsylvania Cavalry to form the 1st Regiment Pennsylvania Provisional Cavalry.

== Casualties ==
The regiment lost a total of 253 men during service; 6 officers and 52 enlisted men killed or mortally wounded, 2 officers and 193 enlisted men died of disease.

== Commanders ==
- Colonel Richard Butler Price - promoted to brevet brigadier general March 13, 1865
- Colonel William W. Sanders - Transferred to 1st Pro. Cavalry, June 17, 1865

== See also ==
- List of Pennsylvania Civil War regiments
- Pennsylvania in the American Civil War
