= 3rd Massachusetts Battery =

- Active: September 5, 1861 - September 16, 1864
- Country: United States
- Allegiance: Union
- Branch: Artillery
- Engagements: Siege of Yorktown; Seven Days Battles; Battle of Beaver Dam Creek; Battle of Gaines's Mill; Battle of White Oak Swamp; Battle of Malvern Hill; Battle of Antietam; Battle of Fredericksburg; Battle of Chancellorsville; Battle of Gettysburg; Bristoe Campaign; Mine Run Campaign; Battle of the Wilderness; Battle of Spotsylvania Court House; Battle of North Anna; Battle of Totopotomoy Creek; Battle of Cold Harbor; Siege of Petersburg

Commanders
- Notable commanders: Cpt. Augustus Pearl Martin

The 3rd Massachusetts Battery (or, 3rd Battery, Massachusetts Light Artillery), was an artillery battery that served in the Union Army during the American Civil War.

== Service ==
The battery was organized Boston, Massachusetts and mustered in September 5, 1861 for a three-year enlistment under the command of Captain Augustus Pearl Martin.

The battery was attached to Porter's Division, Army of the Potomac, to March 1862. Artillery, 1st Division, III Corps, Army of the Potomac, to May 1862. Artillery, 1st Division, V Corps, Army of the Potomac, to June 1863. Artillery Brigade, V Corps, to September 1864.

The 3rd Massachusetts Battery mustered out of service September 16, 1864.

== Detailed service ==
Moved to Washington, D. C., September 5–11. At Hall's Hill, Va., defenses of Washington, until March 1862. Advanced on Manassas, Va., March 10–15. Moved to Fort Monroe March 21–24. Reconnaissance to Big Bethel March 27. Warwick Road April 5. Siege of Yorktown April 5-May 4. Hanover Court House May 27. Operations about Hanover Court House May 27–29. Seven Days Battles before Richmond June 25-July 1. Battle of Beaver Dam Creek June 26. Battle of Gaines's Mill June 27. Battle of White Oak Swamp and Turkey Bridge June 30. Battle of Malvern Hill July 1. At Harrison's Landing until August 15. Moved to Fort Monroe, then to Manassas, Va., August 15–28. Pope's campaign in northern Virginia August 28-September 2. Groveton August 29. Second Battle of Bull Run August 30. Maryland Campaign September–October. Battle of Antietam September 16–17. Shepherdstown September 19. At Sharpsburg until October 30. Reconnaissance to Leetown October 16–17. Leetown October 17. Movement to White Plains and Falmouth, Va., October 30-November 19. Battle of Fredericksburg December 11–15, "Mud March" January 20–24, 1863. Duty at Falmouth until April. Chancellorsville Campaign April 27-May 6. Battle of Chancellorsville May 1–5. Gettysburg Campaign June 13-July 24. Battle of Gettysburg July 1–3. Bristoe Campaign October 9–22. Rappahannock Station November 7. Mine Run Campaign November 26-December 2. Camp near Rappahannock Station December 4, 1863 to May 1, 1864. Campaign from the Rapidan to the James May–June. Battle of the Wilderness May 5–7. Spotsylvania May 8–12. Spotsylvania Court House May 12–21. Bloody Angle May 12. North Anna River May 23–26. Line of the Pamunkey May 26–28. Totopotomoy May 28–31. Cold Harbor June 1–12. Bethesda Church June 1–3. Before Petersburg June 16–19. Siege of Petersburg June 16-September 5. Six Mile House, Weldon Railroad, August 18–21. Left the front September 4. Veterans and recruits transferred to the 5th Massachusetts Battery August 30. Moved to Boston September 5–9.

== Casualties ==
The battery lost a total of 19 men during service; 9 enlisted men killed or mortally wounded, 10 enlisted men died of disease.

== Commanders ==
- Captain Augustus Pearl Martin
- 1st Lieutenant Aaron Francis Walcott - commanded at the Battle of Gettysburg

== Bibliography ==
- Bowen, James L (1889). Massachusetts in the War 1861–1865. Springfield, MA: Clark W Bryer + Co. OCLC 1986476. This article incorporates text from this source, which is in the public domain.
- Dyer, Frederick H. (1908). A Compendium of the War of the Rebellion. Des Moines, IA: Dyer Pub. Co. ASIN B01BUFJ76Q. This article incorporates text from this source, which is in the public domain.
- Headley, Phineas Camp (1866). Massachusetts in the Rebellion : a Record of the Historical Position of the Commonwealth, and the Services of the Leading Statesmen, the Military, the Colleges, and the People, in the Civil War of 1861-65. Boston, MA: Walker, Fuller & Co. OCLC 8406829. This article incorporates text from this source, which is in the public domain.
- Higginson, Thomas Wentworth (State Historian) (1896). Massachusetts in the Army and Navy During the War of 1861-65, 8 Volumes. Boston, MA: Wright and Potter Printing Co, State Printers. OCLC 1049652105. This article incorporates text from this source, which is in the public domain.
- Schouler, William (1868). A History of Massachusetts in the Civil War. Boston: E.P. Dutton & Co. OCLC 2662693. This article incorporates text from this source, which is in the public domain.
- Stevens, Jesse F (1931). Massachusetts Soldiers, Sailors, and Marines in the Civil War, in 8 Volumes. Norwood, MA: Norwood Press. ASIN B000UH94DC. This article incorporates text from this source, which is in the public domain.
- U.S. War Department (1880). The War of the Rebellion: A Compilation of the Official Records of the Union and Confederate Armies. Washington, DC: U.S. Government Printing Office. This article incorporates text from this source, which is in the public domain.

== See also ==
- List of Massachusetts Civil War units
- Massachusetts in the Civil War
- 3rd Massachusetts Battery monument at Gettysburg Battlefield
