= 86th New York Infantry Regiment =

- Active: November 20, 1861, to June 27, 1865
- Country: United States
- Allegiance: Union
- Branch: Infantry
- Nickname(s): Steuben Rangers
- Engagements: Second Battle of Bull Run; Battle of Fredericksburg; Battle of Chancellorsville; Battle of Brandy Station; Battle of Gettysburg; Bristoe Campaign; Mine Run Campaign; Battle of the Wilderness; Battle of Spotsylvania Court House; Battle of North Anna; Battle of Cold Harbor; Siege of Petersburg; Second Battle of Petersburg; First Battle of Deep Bottom; Battle of Hatcher's Run; Appomattox Campaign; Battle of Sailor's Creek

The 86th New York Infantry Regiment ("Steuben Rangers") was an infantry regiment in the Union Army during the American Civil War.

== Service ==
The 86th New York Infantry was organized at Elmira, New York and mustered in for three years service on November 20, 1861, under the command of Colonel Benajah P. Baily.

The regiment was attached to 2nd Brigade, Casey's Division, Army of the Potomac, to March 1862. Wadsworth's Command, Military District of Washington, to August 1862. Piatt's Brigade, Whipple's Division, to September 1862. 1st Brigade, 3rd Division, III Corps, Army of the Potomac, to June 1863. 2nd Brigade, 1st Division, III Corps, to March 1864. 1st Brigade, 3rd Division, II Corps, to June 1865.

The 86th New York Infantry mustered out of service on June 27, 1865.

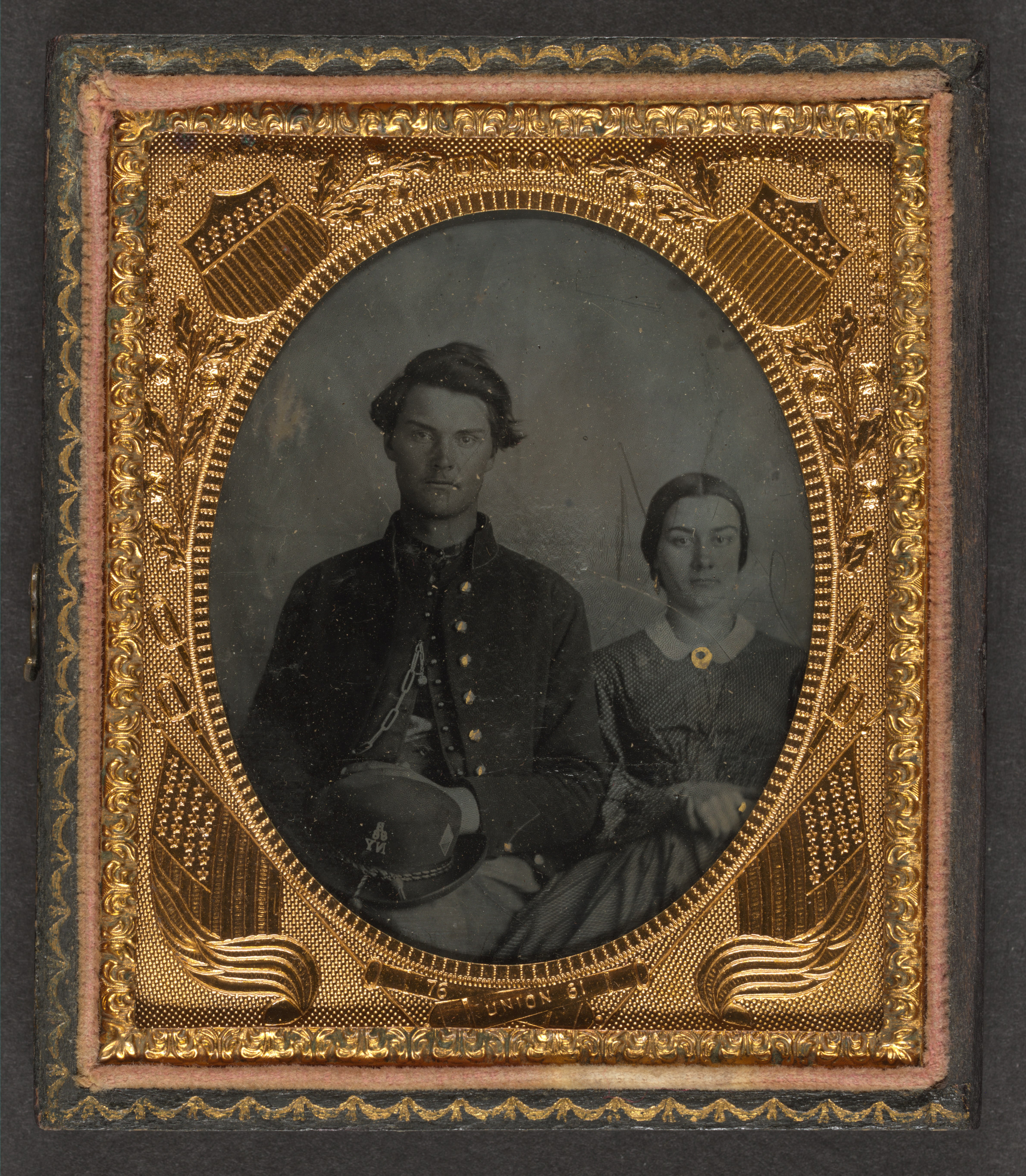
Soldier of Company B, 86th New York Infantry Regiment 3d Corps

== Detailed service ==
- Left New York for Washington, D.C., November 23, 1861.
- Duty in the defenses of Washington, D.C. until August 1862.
- Pope's Campaign in northern Virginia August 16-September 2.
- Duty in the defenses of Washington until October.
- Moved to Point of Rocks, then to Pleasant Valley, Md., October 18–19.
- Movement toward Warrenton, Va., October 24-November 16.
- Reconnaissance to Manassas Gap, Va., and skirmish November 5–6.
- Movement to Falmouth, Va., November 18–24.
- Battle of Fredericksburg, Va., December 12–15.
- Duty near Falmouth until April 27, 1863.
- "Mud March" January 20–24.
- Chancellorsville Campaign April 27-May 6.
- Battle of Chancellorsville May 1–5.
- Brandy Station and Beverly Ford June 9.
- Gettysburg Campaign June 11-July 24.
- Battle of Gettysburg July 1–3.
- Pursuit of Lee July 5–24.
- Wapping Heights, Va., July 23.
- Duty on line of the Rappahannock until October.
- Bristoe Campaign October 9–22.
- Advance to line of the Rappahannock November 7–8.
- Kelly's Ford November 7.
- Mine Run Campaign November 26-December 2.
- Duty near Brandy Station until May, 1864.
- Demonstration on the Rapidan February 6–7.
- Campaign from the Rapidan to the James May 3-June 15.
- Battle of the Wilderness May 5–7.
- Spotsylvania May 8–12.
- Po River May 10.
- Spotsylvania Court House May 12–21.
- Assault on the Salient, "Bloody Angle," May 12.
- North Anna River May 23–26.
- On line of the Pamunkey May 26–28.
- Totopotomoy May 28–31.
- Cold Harbor June 1–12.
- Before Petersburg June 16–18.
- Siege of Petersburg June 16, 1864, to April 2, 1865.
- Jerusalem Plank Road, Weldon Railroad, June 22–23, 1864.
- Demonstration north of the James July 27–29.
- Deep Bottom July 27–28.
- Demonstration north of the James August 13–20.
- Strawberry Plains, Deep Bottom, August 14–18.
- Poplar Springs Church September 29-October 2.
- Boydton Plank Road, Hatcher's Run, October 27–28.
- Reconnaissance to Weldon Railroad December 9–10.
- Dabney's Mills, Hatcher's Run, February 5–7, 1865.
- Watkins' House March 25.
- Appomattox Campaign March 28-April 9.
- Boydton and White Oak Roads March 29–31.
- Crow's House March 31.
- Fall of Petersburg April 2.
- Sailor's Creek April 6.
- High Bridge and Farmville April 7.
- Appomattox Court House April 9.
- Surrender of Lee and his army. At Burkesville until May 2.
- Moved to Washington, D.C., May 2–12.
- Grand Review of the Armies May 23.

== Casualties ==
The regiment lost a total of 303 men during service; 13 officers and 159 enlisted men killed or mortally wounded, 2 officers and 129 enlisted men died of disease.

== Commanders ==
- Colonel Benajah P. Baily
- Colonel Nathan H. Vincent
- Lieutenant Colonel Bena J. Chapin - commanded at the Battle of Fredericksburg; killed in action at the Battle of Chancellorsville while in command of the regiment
- Lieutenant Colonel Benjamin L. Higgins - commanded at the Battle of Gettysburg until wounded on July 2
- Major Jacob H. Lansing - commanded at the Battle of Chancellorsville while still at the rank of captain after Ltc Chapin was killed; commanded at the Battle of Gettysburg after Ltc Higgins was wounded
- Major Michael Stafford - commanded during the Mine Run Campaign; killed in action at Cold Harbor while serving as lieutenant colonel

== See also ==
- List of New York Civil War regiments
- New York in the Civil War
