= 95th Pennsylvania Volunteer Infantry =

Union Army volunteer infantry regiment

- Active: 1861-1865
- Country: Union
- Size: 1,962

The 95th Pennsylvania Infantry was a volunteer infantry regiment which served in the Union Army during the American Civil War. This regiment was also sometimes referred to as Gosline's Zouaves because its members wore Zouave-style uniforms during the early portion of their service tenure. As the war progressed, the regiment's uniforms were modified, keeping the Zouave-style jackets and vests, but eliminating the scarlet pants, scarlet-trimmed kepis, and tan gaiters.

Three of its members were ultimately awarded the Medal of Honor.

== History ==
The regiment was formed in Philadelphia, Pennsylvania from August to October 1861, with one company from New Jersey and the other nine from Pennsylvania. When the 95th Pennsylvania fought at The Seven Days Battle, the 95th held against the infamous Wheat's Battalion. One of the Gosline Zouaves killed Confederate Maj. Wheat.

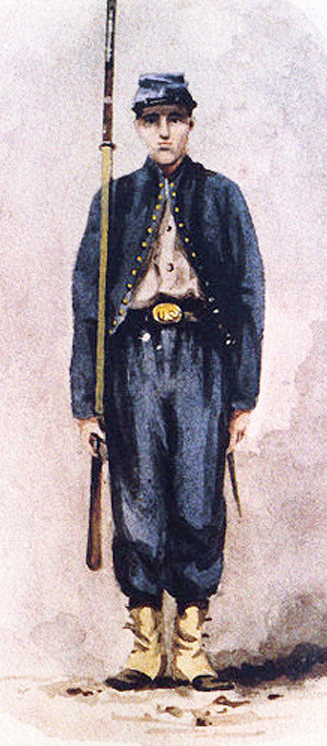
An example of a 95th PA uniform.

== Casualties ==
Among the casualties sustained by this regiment during the war were two colonels, two lieutenant-colonels, a major, and an adjutant killed in action.

- Killed and mortally wounded: 11 officers, 171 enlisted men
- Disease-related deaths: 1 officer, 72 enlisted men
- Total:12 officers, 243 enlisted men

== Honors and awards ==
Three of this regiment's members were awarded the Medal of Honor:

- Fox, William R. (private, Co. A:) Issued March 28, 1878 for valor displayed April 2, 1865 when capturing the Confederate flag at the Customs House in Petersburg, Virginia and when assisting in the capture of an enemy gun
- Galloway, George N. (private, Co. G): Issued October 24, 1895 for valor displayed while holding a critical position at Alsops Farm, Virginia while under heavy enemy fire on May 8, 1864
- Wilson, Francis A. (corporal, Co. B): Issued June 25, 1880 for valor displayed while capturing a gun as one of the first members of the regiment to penetrate the enemy's lines at Petersburg, Virginia on April 2, 1865

== External resources ==
- 95th Pennsylvania at Centreville, Virginia (photo), in "Pennsylvania in the Civil War." PA-Roots, retrieved online July 4, 2018.
- Letter from Lt. Col. Elisha Hall, in "Pennsylvania in the Civil War." PA-Roots: Retrieved online July 4, 2018.
