= 7th New Jersey Infantry Regiment =

The 7th New Jersey Infantry Regiment was an American Civil War infantry regiment from New Jersey that served a three-year enlistment in the Union Army. It was mustered into federal service on September 3, 1861. The regiment trained at Camp Olden in Trenton, before being sent out to join the Army of the Potomac. In the spring of 1862, Company B was disbanded, and the enlisted men were assigned by transfer to different Companies in the Regiment. On June 14, 1862, an independent company, commanded by Captain Edward G. Sloat, then at Alexandria, Va., was assigned to the Regiment, and designated Company B.

== Organizing ==
The 7th New Jersey Infantry Regiment was organized at Camp Olden, Trenton, New Jersey, and mustered in September 3, 1861. Seven companies left State for Washington, D.C., September 19, 1861, and three companies on October 3, 1861.

Attached to:

- Casey's Provisional Brigade, Division of the Potomac, to October 1861
- 3rd Brigade, Hooker's Division, Army of the Potomac, to March 1862
- 3rd Brigade, 2nd Division, 3rd Army Corps, Army of the Potomac, to March 1864
- 1st Brigade, 4th Division, 2nd Army Corps, to May 1864
- 3rd Brigade, 3rd Division, 2nd Army Corps, to July 1865

== Original regimental commanders ==
The following officers led the regiment at the outset. Staff officers, including the Colonel, were generally listed under Company S. Unassigned replacements were listed under Company U.

- Colonel Joseph W. Revere
- Lieutenant-Colonel Ezra A. Carman
- Major J. Dallas McIntosh
- Adjutant Francis Price, Jr
- Quartermaster Thomas P. Johnston
- Surgeon DeWitt D. Hough
- Assistant Surgeon Alvin Satterthwait
- Assistant Surgeon (originally vacant)
- Chaplain Julius D. Rose

== Original company commanders ==
- Company A – Captain Louis R. Francine
  - First Lieutenant Thomas C. Thompson
  - Second Lieutenant Michael G. Bauer
- Company B – Captain John Craven
  - First Lieutenant William N. Fitzgerald
  - Second Lieutenant Gardner E. Green
- Company C – Captain Henry C. Bartlett
  - First Lieutenant Warren McChesney
  - Second Lieutenant William J. Harrison
- Company D – Captain John J. Fritschy
  - First Lieutenant August Mueller
  - Second Lieutenant Henry Newhouse
- Company E – Captain Henry C. Cooper
  - First Lieutenant Joseph Abott, Jr
  - Second Lieutenant Daniel Hart
- Company F – Captain Frederick Cooper
  - First Lieutenant Alpheus Witherall
  - Second Lieutenant Adolphus T. Chazotte
- Company G – Captain James McKiernan
  - First Lieutenant Thomas R. Agnew
  - Second Lieutenant William J. Evans
- Company H – Captain John M. Clark
  - First Lieutenant Francis M. Dubois
  - Second Lieutenant Joseph H. Johnson
- Company I – Captain Lindsay D. Simmes
  - First Lieutenant
  - Second Lieutenant Henry A. Courson
- Company K – Captain James M. Brown
  - First Lieutenant William R. Hillyer
  - Second Lieutenant Michael Mullery
- Band – Leader William F. Hutchinson

== Service ==
=== 1861 ===
- At Meridian Hill till December 6, 1861.
- Expedition to Lower Maryland November 3–11.
- Duty at Budd's Ferry, Md., till April 1862.

=== 1862 ===
- Moved to the Virginia Peninsula April 5–8
- Siege of Yorktown, Va., April 10 – May 4
- Battle of Williamsburg May 5
- Battle of Fair Oaks (or Seven Pines) May 31 – June 1
- Duty near Seven Pines till June 25
- Seven days before Richmond June 25 – July 1
- Action at Oak Grove (near Seven Pines) June 25
- Battle of Savage Station June 29
- Battle of Glendale June 30
- Battle of Malvern Hill July 1
- At Harrison's Landing till August 15
- Movement to Centreville, Va., August 15–26
- Pope's Campaign in Northern Virginia August 26 – September 2
- Action at Bristoe Station (or Kettle Run) August 27
- Battle of Groveton August 29
- Second Battle of Bull Run August 30
- Battle of Chantilly September 1
- Duty in the Defences of Washington till November 1
- Movement to Falmouth, Va.. November 1–28
- Duty near Falmouth November 28 – December 11
- Battle of Fredericksburg, Va., December 12–15
- Duty near Falmouth till April 27, 1863.
- According to the April 4, 1863 issue of the magazine Harper's Weekly, a wedding was held in the 7th New Jersey Volunteers camp while they were camped near Fredericksburg where Union forces were expecting to expel an attack from Fredericksburg, Virginia. The groom, a Captain Daniel Hart, could not get leave to have a proper wedding so the bride, Nellie Lammond, and her bridal party came to camp to be married there. Allegedly, General Hooker was in attendance as well as Sickes, Carr, Mott, and many more officers.

=== 1863 ===
- "Mud March" January 20–24
- Operations at Rappahannock Bridge and Grove Church February 5–7
- Chancellorsville Campaign April 27 – May 6
- Battle of Chancellorsville May 1–6
- Gettysburg campaign June 11 – July 24
- Battle of Gettysburg July 1–3
- Pursuit of Lee to Manassas Gap, Va., July 5–24
- Wapping Heights July 23
- Duty near Warrenton till October
- Bristoe Campaign October 9–22
- McLean's Ford October 15
- Advance to line of the Rappahannock November 7–8
- Kelly's Ford November 7
- Mine Run Campaign November 26 – December 2
- Payne's Farm November 27
- Duty near Brandy Station till May 1864

=== 1864 ===
- Demonstration on the Rapidan February 6–7
- Campaign from the Rapidan to the James May 3 – June 15
- Battle of the Wilderness May 5–7
- Battle of Spotsylvania May 8–12
- Battle of Spotsylvania Court House May 12–21
- Assault on the Salient ("Bloody Angle") May 12
- Harris Farm, Fredericksburg Road, May 19
- North Anna River May 23–26
- Ox Ford May 23–24
- On line of the Pamunkey May 26–28
- Totopotomoy May 28–31
- Cold Harbor June 1–12
- Before Petersburg June 16–18
- Siege of Petersburg June 16, 1864, to April 2, 1865
- Jerusalem Plank Road June 22–23, 1864
- Demonstration north of the James July 27–29
- Deep Bottom July 27–28
- Demonstration north of the James August 13–20
- Strawberry Plains, Deep Bottom, August 14–18
- Ream's Station August 25
- Fort Sedgwick September 10
- Poplar Springs Church September 29 – October 2
- Yellow House October 2–5
- Boydton Plank Road. Hatcher's Run, October 27–28
- Warren's Raid on Weldon Railroad December 7–12

=== 1865 ===
- Dabney's Mills, Hatcher's Run, February 5–7
- Watkins' House March 25
- Appomattox Campaign March 28 – April 9
- Boydton and White Oak Road March 30–31
- Crow's House March 31
- Fall of Petersburg April 2
- Pursuit of Lee April 3–9
- Sailor's Creek April 6
- High Bridge, Farmville, April 7
- Appomattox Court House April 9
- Surrender of Lee and his army
- March to Washington, D.C., May 2–12
- Grand Review May 23
- Duty at Washington, D.C., till July

== Disbanding ==
Mustered out July 17, 1865. Non-Veterans mustered out at Trenton October 7, 1864. <dy_1360>Regiment lost during service 11 Officers and 126 Enlisted men killed and mortally wounded and 2 Officers and 121 Enlisted men by disease. Total 260.

== Sources ==
http://www.civilwararchive.com/Unreghst/unnjinf2.htm#7thinf
