= Battle of Seven Pines order of battle: Union =

The following Union Army units and commanders fought in the Battle of Seven Pines on May 31 and June 1, 1862. The Confederate order of battle is listed separately.

== Abbreviations used ==
=== Military rank ===
- MG = Major General
- BG = Brigadier General
- Col = Colonel
- Ltc = Lieutenant Colonel
- Maj = Major
- Cpt = Captain
- Lt = Lieutenant

=== Other ===
- w = wounded
- mw = mortally wounded
- k = killed

== Army of the Potomac ==
MG George B. McClellan

Chief of Staff: Col Randolph B. Marcy

Division	Brigade	Regiments and Others
General Headquarters; Maj Granville O. Haller	Headquarter & Body Guards	4th U.S. Cavalry (2 companies); Sturgis Rifles (Illinois); Oneida (New York) Cavalry
General Headquarters; Maj Granville O. Haller	Provost Guards	2nd U.S. Cavalry; 8th U.S. (2 companies)
General Headquarters; Maj Granville O. Haller		93rd New York (4 companies); McClellan Dragoons (Illinois)
Chief of Engineers; BG John G. Barnard	Volunteer Engineer Brigade BG Daniel P. Woodbury	15th New York Engineers; 50th New York Engineers
Chief of Engineers; BG John G. Barnard		U.S. Engineer Battalion (3 companies): Cpt James C. Duane

=== II Corps ===
BG Edwin V. Sumner

Division	Brigade	Regiments and Others
First Division; BG Israel B. Richardson	1st Brigade BG Oliver O. Howard (w); Col Thomas J. Parker	5th New Hampshire: Col Edward E. Cross (w), Ltc Samuel G. Langley; 61st New York: Col Francis C. Barlow, Ltc William Massett (k); 64th New York: Ltc Daniel C. Bingham (w); 81st Pennsylvania: Col James Miller (k), Ltc Charles F. Johnson
First Division; BG Israel B. Richardson	2nd Brigade BG Thomas F. Meagher	63rd New York: Col John Burke; 69th New York: Col Robert Nugent; 88th New York: Ltc Patrick Kelly
First Division; BG Israel B. Richardson	3rd Brigade BG William H. French	52nd New York: Col Paul Frank; 57th New York: Col Samuel K. Zook; 66th New York: Col Joseph C. Pinckney; 53rd Pennsylvania: Col John R. Brooke, Maj Thomas Yeager (k)
First Division; BG Israel B. Richardson	Artillery Cpt George W. Hazzard	Battery B, 1st New York Light Artillery: Cpt Rufus D. Pettit; Battery G, 1st New York Light Artillery: Cpt John D. Frank; Battery A & Battery C, 4th U.S. Artillery: Cpt George W. Hazzard
First Division; BG Israel B. Richardson	Cavalry	6th New York Cavalry (Co. D)
Second Division; BG John Sedgwick	1st Brigade BG Willis A. Gorman	15th Massachusetts: Col John W. Kimball; 1st Minnesota: Col Alfred Sully; 34th New York: Col James A. Suiter; 82nd New York: Ltc Henry W. Hudson; 1st Company, Massachusetts Sharpshooters: Cpt John Saunders; 2nd Company, Minnesota Sharpshooters: Cpt William F. Russell
Second Division; BG John Sedgwick	2nd Brigade BG William W. Burns	69th Pennsylvania: Col Joshua T. Owen; 71st Pennsylvania: Maj Charles W. Smith; 72nd Pennsylvania: Col De Witt C. Baxter; 106th Pennsylvania: Col Turner G. Morehead
Second Division; BG John Sedgwick	3rd Brigade BG Napoleon J.T. Dana	19th Massachusetts: Col Edward W. Hinks; 20th Massachusetts: Col W. Raymond Lee; 7th Michigan: Col Ira R. Grosvenor, Maj John H. Richardson; 42nd New York: Col Edmund C. Charles
Second Division; BG John Sedgwick	Artillery Col Charles H. Tompkins	Battery A, 1st Rhode Island Light Artillery: Cpt John A. Tompkins; Battery B, 1st Rhode Island Light Artillery: Cpt Walter O. Bartlett; Battery G, 1st Rhode Island Light Artillery: Cpt Charles D. Owen; Battery I, 1st U.S. Artillery: Lt Edmund Kirby
Second Division; BG John Sedgwick	Cavalry	6th New York Cavalry (Co. K): Cpt Riley Johnston

=== III Corps ===
BG Samuel P. Heintzelman

Division	Brigade	Regiments and Others
Second Division; BG Joseph Hooker	1st Brigade BG Cuvier Grover	1st Massachusetts: Maj Charles P. Chandler; 11th Massachusetts: Ltc Porter D. Tripp; 2nd New Hampshire: Col Gilman Marston; 26th Pennsylvania: Maj Casper M. Berry
Second Division; BG Joseph Hooker	2nd Brigade BG Daniel Sickles	70th New York: Maj Thomas Holt; 71st New York: Col George B. Hall; 72nd New York: Col Nelson Taylor; 73rd New York: Maj John D. Moriarty, Cpt Charles B. Elliot; 74th New York: Col Charles K. Graham
Second Division; BG Joseph Hooker	3rd Brigade BG Francis E. Patterson; Col Samuel H. Starr	5th New Jersey: Col Samuel H. Starr; 6th New Jersey: Col Gershom Mott; 7th New Jersey: Col Joseph W. Revere; 8th New Jersey: Col Adolphus J. Johnson
Second Division; BG Joseph Hooker	Artillery Maj Charles S. Wainwright	Battery D, 1st New York Light Artillery: Cpt Thomas W. Osborn; 4th New York Independent Battery: Cpt James E. Smith; 6th New York Independent Battery: Cpt Walter M. Bramhall; Battery H, 1st U.S. Artillery: Lt Charles R. Eakin
Third Division; BG Philip Kearny	1st Brigade BG Charles D. Jameson (w)	87th New York: Col Stephen A. Dodge (w), Ltc Richard A. Bachia; 57th Pennsylvania: Col Charles T. Campbell (w), Ltc E. W. Woods, Maj Jeremiah Culp (k); 63rd Pennsylvania: Col Alexander Hays, Ltc Algernon S. M. Morgan (w); 105th Pennsylvania: Col Amor A. McKnight (w)
Third Division; BG Philip Kearny	2nd Brigade BG David B. Birney; Col J. H. Hobart Ward	3rd Maine: Col Henry G. Staples; 4th Maine: Col Elijah Walker; 38th New York: Col J. H. Hobart Ward; 40th New York: Col Edward J. Riley (w), Ltc Thomas W. Egan
Third Division; BG Philip Kearny	3rd Brigade BG Hiram G. Berry	2nd Michigan: Col Orlando M. Poe, Ltc Adolphus Williams (w); 3rd Michigan: Col Stephen G. Champlin (w); 5th Michigan: Col Henry D. Terry; 37th New York: Col Samuel B. Hayman
Third Division; BG Philip Kearny	Artillery Cpt James Thompson	Battery B, New Jersey Light Artillery: Cpt Adoniram J. Clark; Battery E, 1st Rhode Island Light Artillery: Lt John K. Bucklyn; Battery G, 2nd U.S. Artillery: Lt John H. Butler
	Cavalry	3rd Pennsylvania Cavalry: Col William W. Averell

=== IV Corps ===
BG Erasmus D. Keyes

Division	Brigade	Regiments and Others
First Division; BG Darius N. Couch	1st Brigade BG John J. Peck	55th New York: Ltc Louis Thourot; 62nd New York: Col J. Lafayette Riker (k), Ltc David J. Nevin; 93rd Pennsylvania: Col J. M. McCarter (w), Cpt John E. Arthur; 102nd Pennsylvania: Col Thomas A. Rowley (w), Ltc J. M. Kinkead
First Division; BG Darius N. Couch	2nd Brigade BG John J. Abercrombie	65th New York: Col John Cochrane; 67th New York: Col Julius W. Adams (w), Ltc Nelson Cross; 23rd Pennsylvania: Col Thomas H. Neill, Ltc John Ely (w); 61st Pennsylvania: Col Oliver H. Rippey (k), Cpt Robert L. Orr; 82d Pennsylvania: Col David H. Williams
First Division; BG Darius N. Couch	3rd Brigade BG Charles Devens (w); Col Charles H. Innes	7th Massachusetts: Col David A. Russell; 10th Massachusetts: Col Henry S. Briggs (w), Cpt Orzo Miller; 36th New York: Ltc D. E. Hungerford
First Division; BG Darius N. Couch	Artillery Maj Robert M. West	Battery C, 1st Pennsylvania Light Artillery: Cpt Jeremiah McCarthy; Battery D, 1st Pennsylvania Light Artillery: Cpt Edward H. Flood; Battery E, 1st Pennsylvania Light Artillery: Cpt Theodore Miller; Battery H, 1st Pennsylvania Light Artillery: Cpt James Brady
First Division; BG Darius N. Couch	Cavalry	6th New York Cavalry (Co. F)
Third Division; BG Silas Casey	1st Brigade BG Henry M. Naglee	11th Maine: Col Harris M. Plaisted; 56th New York: Ltc James Jourdan; 100th New York: Col James M. Brown (k); 52nd Pennsylvania: Col John C. Dodge Jr.; 104th Pennsylvania: Col W. W. H. Davis (w), Ltc John W. Nields (w), Maj John M. Gries (mw)
Third Division; BG Silas Casey	2nd Brigade BG Henry W. Wessells	96th New York: Col James Fairman; 85th Pennsylvania: Col Joshua B. Howell; 101st Pennsylvania: Ltc David B. Morris (w); 103rd Pennsylvania: Maj A. W. Gazzam
Third Division; BG Silas Casey	3rd Brigade BG Innis N. Palmer	81st New York: Ltc Jacob J. DeForest (w), Cpt W. C. Raulston; 85th New York: Col Jonathan S. Belknap; 92nd New York: Col Lewis C. Hunt (w), Ltc Hiram Anderson Jr.; 98th New York: Ltc Charles Durkee
Third Division; BG Silas Casey	Artillery Col Guilford D. Bailey (k); Maj D. H. Van Valkenburgh (k); Cpt Peter C. Regan	Battery A, 1st New York Light Artillery: Lt George P. Hart; Battery H, 1st New York Light Artillery: Cpt Joseph Spratt (w), Lt Charles E. Mink; 7th New York Independent Battery: Cpt Peter C. Regan; 8th New York Independent Battery: Cpt Butler Fitch
Third Division; BG Silas Casey	Cavalry	6th New York Cavalry (Co. B):
	Cavalry	8th Pennsylvania Cavalry: Col David M. Gregg

=== V Corps ===
BG Fitz John Porter

Division	Brigade	Regiments and Others
First Division; BG George W. Morell	1st Brigade BG John H. Martindale	2nd Maine; 18th Massachusetts; 22nd Massachusetts; 13th New York; 25th New York; 2nd Company, Massachusetts Sharpshooters:
First Division; BG George W. Morell	2nd Brigade Col James McQuade	9th Massachusetts; 4th Michigan; 14th New York; 62nd Pennsylvania
First Division; BG George W. Morell	3rd Brigade BG Daniel Butterfield	16th Michigan; 12th New York; 17th New York; 44th New York; 83rd Pennsylvania; Brady's Company, Michigan Sharpshooters:
First Division; BG George W. Morell	Artillery Cpt Charles Griffin	Battery C, Massachusetts Light Artillery; Battery E, Massachusetts Light Artillery; Battery C, 1st Rhode Island Light Artillery; Battery D, 5th U.S. Artillery
First Division; BG George W. Morell	Sharpshooters	1st U.S. Sharpshooters: Col Hiram Berdan
Second Division; BG George Sykes	1st Brigade Col Robert C. Buchanan	3rd U.S.; 4th U.S.; 12th U.S.; 14th U.S.
Second Division; BG George Sykes	2nd Brigade Ltc William Chapman	2nd U.S.; 6th U.S.; 10th U.S.; 11th U.S.; 17th U.S.
Second Division; BG George Sykes	3rd Brigade Col Gouverneur K. Warren	5th New York; 1st Connecticut Heavy Artillery (serving as infantry)
Artillery Reserve; Col Henry J. Hunt	1st Brigade Ltc William Hays	Battery M, 2nd U.S. Artillery: Captain Henry Benson; Battery C–G, 3rd U.S. Artillery
Artillery Reserve; Col Henry J. Hunt	2nd Brigade Ltc George W. Getty	Battery E, 1st U.S. Artillery: Lt Alanson Merwin Randol; Battery G & K, 1st U.S. Artillery; Battery G, 4th U.S. Artillery; Battery A, 5th U.S. Artillery; Battery K, 5th U.S. Artillery
Artillery Reserve; Col Henry J. Hunt	3rd Brigade Maj Albert Arndt	Battery A, 1st New York Artillery Battalion; Battery B, 1st New York Artillery Battalion; Battery C, 1st New York Artillery Battalion; Battery D, 1st New York Artillery Battalion
Artillery Reserve; Col Henry J. Hunt	4th Brigade Cpt J. Howard Carlisle	Battery E, 2nd U.S. Artillery; Battery F–K, 3rd U.S. Artillery; Battery K, 4th U.S. Artillery

=== VI Corps ===
BG William B. Franklin

Division	Brigade	Regiments and Others
First Division; BG Henry W. Slocum	1st Brigade BG George W. Taylor	1st New Jersey; 2nd New Jersey; 3rd New Jersey; 4th New Jersey
First Division; BG Henry W. Slocum	2nd Brigade Col Joseph J. Bartlett	5th Maine; 16th New York; 27th New York; 96th Pennsylvania
First Division; BG Henry W. Slocum	3rd Brigade BG John Newton	18th New York; 31st New York; 32nd New York; 95th Pennsylvania
First Division; BG Henry W. Slocum	Artillery Cpt Edward R. Platt	Battery A, Massachusetts Light Artillery; Battery A, New Jersey Light Artillery; Battery D, 2nd U.S. Artillery
Second Division; BG William F. Smith	1st Brigade BG Winfield S. Hancock	6th Maine; 43rd New York; 49th Pennsylvania; 5th Wisconsin
Second Division; BG William F. Smith	2nd Brigade BG William T. H. Brooks	2nd Vermont; 3rd Vermont; 4th Vermont; 5th Vermont; 6th Vermont
Second Division; BG William F. Smith	3rd Brigade BG John W. Davidson	7th Maine; 33rd New York; 49th New York; 77th New York
Second Division; BG William F. Smith	Artillery Cpt Romeyn B. Ayres	Battery E, 1st New York Light Artillery; 1st New York Independent Battery; 3rd New York Independent Battery; Battery F, 5th U.S. Artillery
Second Division; BG William F. Smith	Cavalry	1st New York Cavalry

=== Reserves ===
Division	Brigade	Regiments and Others
Cavalry Reserve; BG Philip St. George Cooke	1st Brigade BG William H. Emory	5th U.S. Cavalry; 6th U.S. Cavalry; 6th Pennsylvania Cavalry
Cavalry Reserve; BG Philip St. George Cooke	2nd Brigade Col George A.H. Blake	1st U.S. Cavalry; 8th Pennsylvania Cavalry
	Advance Guard BG George Stoneman	8th Illinois Cavalry; 98th Pennsylvania; 2nd Rhode Island; Battery A, 2nd U.S. Artillery; Batteries B and L, 2nd U.S. Artillery
	White House Command Ltc Rufus Ingalls	93rd New York (6 companies); 11th Pennsylvania Cavalry (5 companies); Battery F, 1st New York Light Artillery

== Sources ==
- Sears, Stephen W. To the Gates of Richmond: The Peninsula Campaign. New York: Ticknor & Fields, 1992. ISBN 0-89919-790-6.
- Richard, J. (27 January 2007). "The Armies at the Battle of Fair Oaks or Seven Pines". History of War.
