= Battle of Hanover Court House order of battle =

The following Union Army and Confederate Army units and commanders fought in the Battle of Hanover Court House of the American Civil War.

== Abbreviations used ==
=== Military rank ===
- BG = Brigadier General
- Col = Colonel
- Ltc = Lieutenant Colonel
- Cpt = Captain

== Confederate ==
BG Lawrence O'Bryan Branch

Brigade	Regiments and Others
Branch's Brigade	7th North Carolina; 18th North Carolina; 28th North Carolina; 33rd North Carolina; 37th North Carolina
Attached Units	45th Georgia; 12th North Carolina; 4th Virginia Cavalry (detachment); Latham's North Carolina Battery

== Union ==
=== V Corps ===
BG Fitz John Porter

Division	Brigade	Regiments and Others
First Division; BG George W. Morell	1st Brigade BG John H. Martindale	2nd Maine; 18th Massachusetts; 22nd Massachusetts; 13th New York; 25th New York; 2nd Company Massachusetts Sharpshooters
First Division; BG George W. Morell	2nd Brigade Col James McQuade	9th Massachusetts; 4th Michigan; 14th New York; 62nd Pennsylvania
First Division; BG George W. Morell	3rd Brigade BG Daniel Butterfield	16th Michigan; 12th New York; 17th New York; 44th New York; 83rd Pennsylvania; Brady's Company Michigan Sharpshooters
First Division; BG George W. Morell	Artillery Cpt Charles Griffin	Battery C, Massachusetts Light; Battery E, Massachusetts Light; Battery C, 1st Rhode Island Light; Battery D, 5th United States
First Division; BG George W. Morell	Sharpshooters Col Hiram Berdan	1st United States Sharpshooters
Second Division; BG George Sykes	1st Brigade Ltc Robert C. Buchanan	3rd United States; 4th United States; 12th United States; 14th United States
Second Division; BG George Sykes	2nd Brigade Ltc William Chapman	2nd United States; 6th United States; 10th United States; 11th United States; 17th United States
Second Division; BG George Sykes	3rd Brigade Col Gouverneur K. Warren	1st Connecticut Heavy Artillery [as infantry]; 5th New York
Second Division; BG George Sykes	Artillery Cpt Stephen H. Weed	Battery L, 3rd United States; Battery M, 3rd United States; Battery I, 5th United States
Second Division; BG George Sykes	Cavalry BG William H. Emory	6th Pennsylvania Cavalry; 5th United States Cavalry; 6th United States Cavalry

== See also ==
- Virginia in the American Civil War
