= Battle of Seven Pines order of battle =

The order of battle for the Battle of Seven Pines, also known as the Battle of Fair Oaks or Fair Oaks Station, includes:

- Battle of Seven Pines order of battle: Confederate
- Battle of Seven Pines order of battle: Union
