= James George Mitchell =

American politician

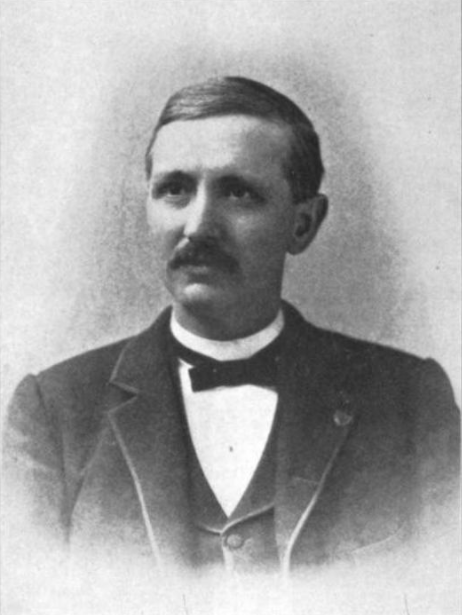
- Born: January 15, 1847; Perrysville, Pennsylvania
- Died: July 19, 1919 (aged 72); Hamilton, Pennsylvania
- Military career
- Allegiance: United States of America
- Branch: United States Army (Union Army)
- Rank: Drummer boy
- Unit: 105th Pennsylvania Infantry
- Conflicts: American Civil War: Peninsula campaign; Siege of Yorktown; Battle of Williamsburg; Battle of Fair Oaks/Seven Pines; Second Battle of Bull Run; Battle of Fredericksburg; Chancellorsville campaign; Battle of Chancellorsville; Gettysburg campaign; Battle of Gettysburg; Mine Run campaign; Overland Campaign; Battle of the Wilderness; Battle of Spotsylvania Court House; Siege of Petersburg; Appomattox campaign; Battle of Sailor's Creek; Battle of Appomattox Court House

James George Mitchell (January 15, 1847 – March 7, 1913) was a Pennsylvania state senator and United States soldier who fought with the Union Army during the American Civil War as a drummer boy and private with Company A of the 105th Pennsylvania Infantry. He served under his older brother, Alexander H. Mitchell (1840–1913), who was later awarded the U.S. Medal of Honor for valor.

== Formative years ==
Born in Perrysville, Pennsylvania, on January 15, 1847, James George Mitchell was a son of Thomas Sharp Mitchell Sr. (1813–1883), a Jefferson County merchant who was a native of Elderton, Pennsylvania, and Hunterdon County, New Jersey, native Sarah E. (Blose) Mitchell. He was raised and educated in the public schools of his community with his siblings: Nancy (1831–1884), Andrew (1833–1863), Sarah Ann (1834–1894), Thomas Sharp Jr. (1838–1898), Alexander H. (1840–1913), Rebecca A. (1842–1910), Martha J. (1844–1923), Malinda (1849–1910), Laura (1852–1909), and Alice R. (1855–1932).

== Civil War ==
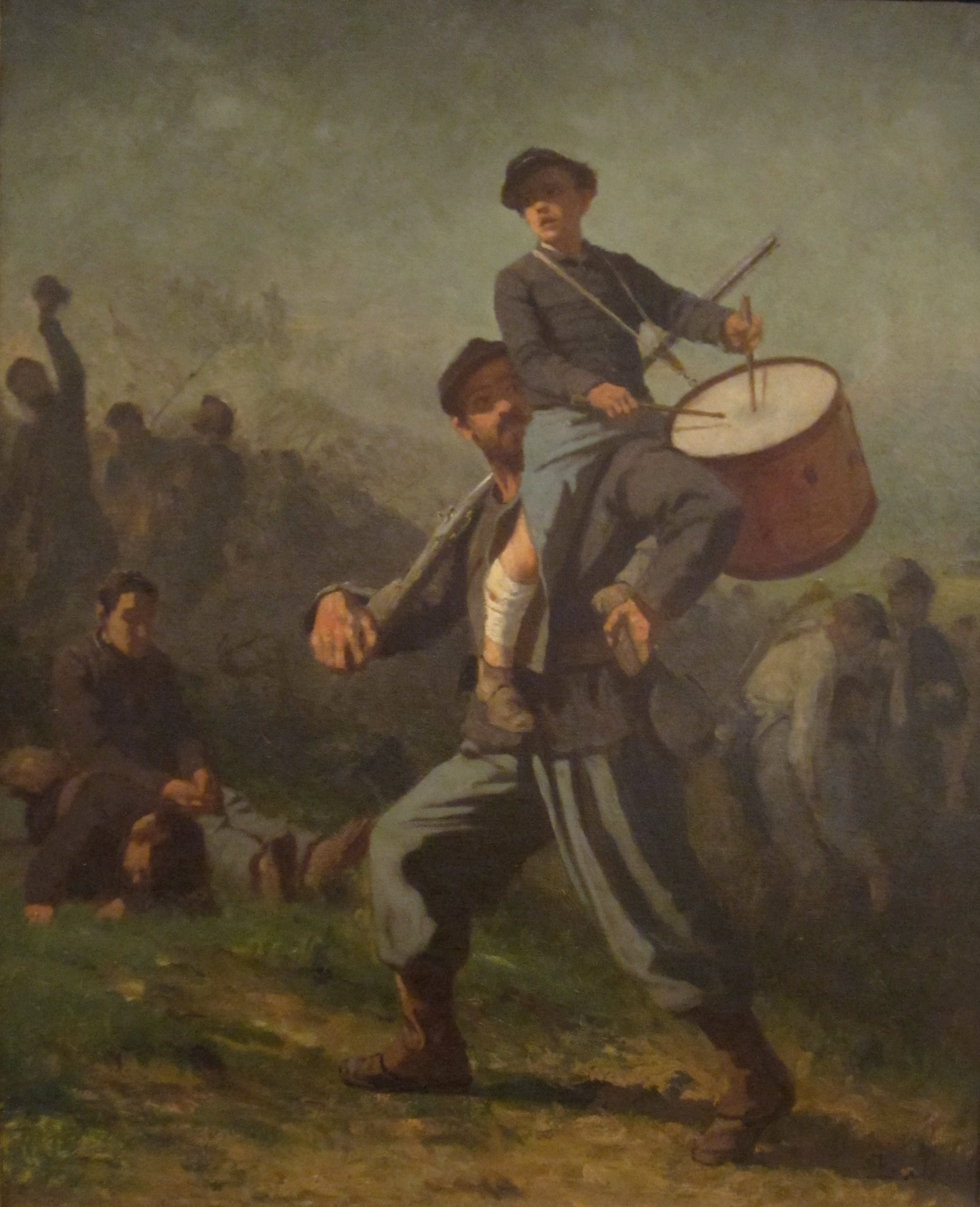
General image of wounded drummer boy, painted by Eastman Johnson, c. 1865–1869

On August 23, 1861, James G. Mitchell enrolled for Civil War military service. Just 15 years old at the time, he then officially mustered in for duty as a drummer boy with Company A of the 105th Pennsylvania Infantry in Pittsburgh on September 9. He went on to serve for the duration of the war under his older brother, Alex, who had mustered in with him that same day as a sergeant.

Ordered to defensive duties near Washington, D.C. in early October, the Mitchell brothers and their fellow 105th Pennsylvanians were transported south by railroad, and pitched their tents at Camp Kalorama on the Kalorama Heights outside of Georgetown, District of Columbia, before relocating again to Alexandria, Virginia, where they were assigned to the brigade led by Brigadier-General Charles Davis Jameson in the U.S. Army division commanded by Brigadier-General Samuel P. Heintzelman. On November 8, James Mitchell's brother, Alex, was promoted to the rank of first sergeant. Reassigned to duties at Fortress Monroe on March 17, 1862, they then engaged in their first significant combat during the Siege of Yorktown (April 5–May 4) and Peninsula campaign (March–July 1862), including the battles of Williamsburg (May 5) and Fair Oaks/Seven Pines (May 31), during which James Mitchell's older brother, Alex, was wounded in action. In his battle report, Jameson described how the day's events unfolded:

All our men had fled from the abattis [sic] in the vicinity of the Richmond Road. Our only alternative was to make the best stand possible with the handful of men under Colonel McKnight. We led them across the open field and up the Richmond Road into the abattis, at a double quick, and under a most terrific fire, deploying one-half on either side of the road. For more than an hour and a half this small force held every inch of ground. At last the enemy broke and ran, and McKnight pursued them through Casey's old camp…. Just as McKnight succeeded in routing the force in his front, our line gave way entirely … and the rebel force came pouring into the Richmond Road directly in his rear, and while the gallant McKnight was pursuing the South Carolina chivalry towards Richmond, the rebel forces directly in his rear were pursuing a portion of our forces toward the Chickahominy. I then received orders to withdraw my men if possible. With great difficulty they succeeded in filing off to the left in the woods toward White Oak Swamp, retreating along the edge of the swamp back to our second line of defences.

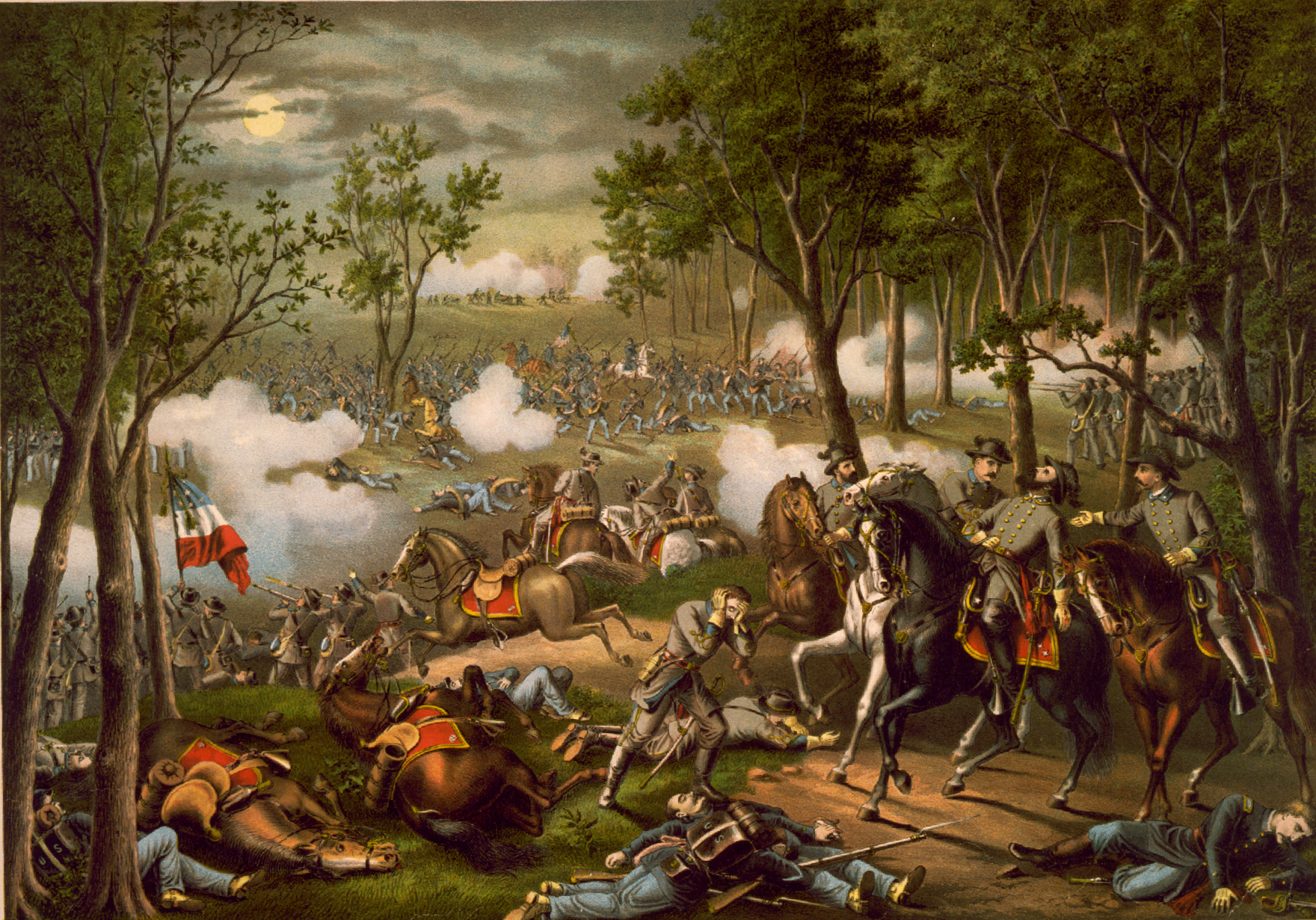
Battle of Chancellorsville, Virginia, May 5–7, 1863

Drummer boy James Mitchell then fought with his regiment in the Second Battle of Bull Run (August 28–30, 1862). Afterward, both brothers and their regiment fought in the final days of the Battle of Fredericksburg (December 1862). James Mitchell's older brother, Alex, was then promoted to the rank of second lieutenant on January 15, 1863. Now part of the 3rd Corps of the Army of the Potomac, they then fought together in the Chancellorsville campaign from April 30 to May 6. Once again, Alex was advanced in rank – this time commissioned as a first lieutenant, and then on May 27 was presented with the Kearny Cross by Brigadier-General Daniel Sickles.

Assigned with their regiment to the Gettysburg campaign, James Mitchell's older brother, Alex, was then wounded in action again – this time during the Battle of Gettysburg, where they and their fellow 105th Pennsylvanians were on the front lines of the intense fighting at Little Round Top from July 2–3. In a post-battle letter, Colonel Craig wrote:

The One Hundred and Fifth never fought so well as at Gettysburg. We rallied some eight or ten times after the rest of the brigade had left us, and the boys fought like demons. Their battle-cry was "Pennsylvania". I could handle them just as well on that field of battle as though they had simply been on drill. This is a state of perfection in discipline that is gained by but few regiments.

Afterward, James Mitchell continued to participate in operations against Confederate troops in Virginia from the late summer through early winter. Briefly under heavy fire near Locust Grove in November 1863, he and his brother then joined their regiment in the Mine Run campaign from November 27 to December 2 before moving to winter quarters later that month. Three days after Christmas, while encamped at Brandy Station, James Mitchell re-enlisted for service as a private with Company A, and was awarded a veterans' furlough. Departing winter quarters on May 4, 1864, the Mitchell brothers and their regiment were assigned to the Overland Campaign of Lieutenant-General Ulysses S. Grant, which immediately brought them under fire in the Battle of the Wilderness (May 5–7). Commissioned but not mustered as a captain on May 7, 1864, his older brother was placed in charge of their unit (Company A).

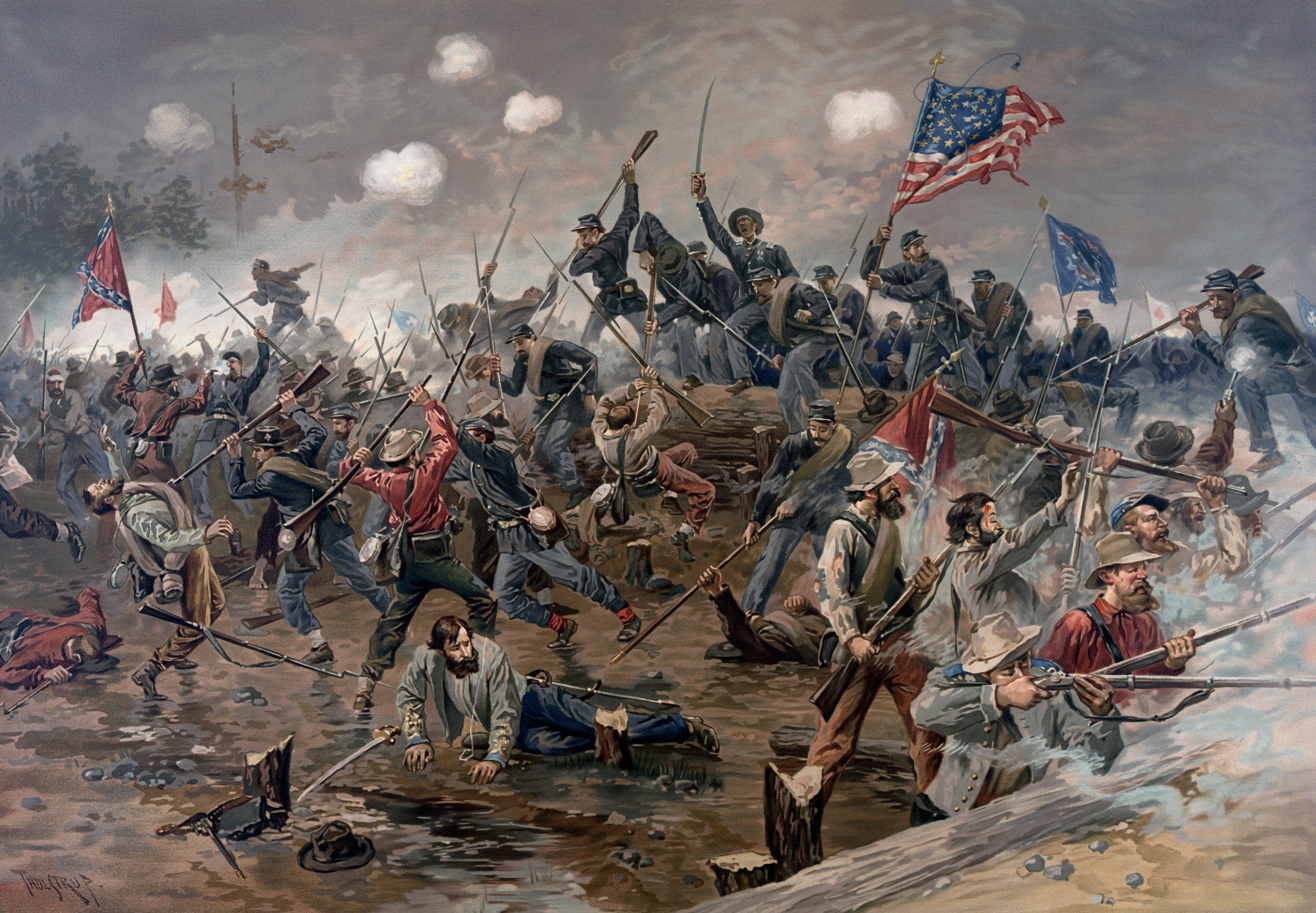
Battle of Spotsylvania Court House, Virginia, May 12, 1864 (Thure de Thulstrup)

Both brothers then fought with their regiment in the Battle of Spotsylvania Court House on May 12. Once again, James Mitchell's older brother performed an act of valor – capturing an enemy flag from the color bearer of the 18th North Carolina Infantry – and once again, his brother was wounded in action.

While his brother recuperated, James Mitchell and their regiment continued to engage with the enemy, including during the battles of North Anna (May 23–26) and Cold Harbor (May 31–June 12). Assigned with his brother and their regiment to duties related to the Siege of Petersburg beginning June 9, James Mitchell then permanently became the only one of the two Mitchell brothers still fighting with the 105th Pennsylvania when his brother was honorably discharged on a surgeon's certificate of disability after having been wounded in action again on June 16, 1864.

A participant with his regiment in the Richmond-Petersburg campaign through March 25, 1865 and then in the war-ending Appomattox campaign, which included the battles of Sailor's Creek and Appomattox Court House, James G. Mitchell honorably mustered out with his regiment on July 11, 1865.

== Post-war life ==
Following his honorable discharge from the military, James Mitchell returned home to Jefferson County, where he wed Caroline Neal (1850–1937). Their children were David Barkley (1869–1875); an unnamed male child, who was born in 1870 but did not survive infancy; and Mabel Clare (1874–1946). For a decade, James Mitchell pursued the trade of plastering before becoming a merchant. A resident and postmaster of Hamilton, he also served as the county auditor in 1874 and as a captain in the Pennsylvania National Guard for a decade. A Republican, he was unsuccessful in his run for the Pennsylvania House of Representatives in 1882, but was elected to the Pennsylvania Senate in 1893. Serving there until 1900, he introduced legislation in 1897 to ensure that city bakeries and small factories producing baked goods would be subject to state factory inspections, that schools statewide would have uniform textbooks which were pre-approved by a gubernatorial commission, and which transferred responsibility for the maintenance and rebuilding of township bridges of more than thirty feet in length to the commissioners of the counties where those bridges were located. In 1899, he was then named chair of the Senate's powerful appropriations committee.

== Death and interment ==
James G. Mitchell died in Hamilton, Pennsylvania, on July 19, 1919. Following funeral services on July 22, he was buried at his community's White Church Cemetery.

== See also ==
- Pennsylvania in the American Civil War
