= Alexander H. Mitchell =

US Army officer and Medal of Honor recipient (1840–1913)

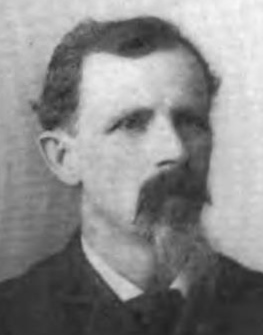
- Alex H. Miller, c. 1902
- Born: November 13, 1840; Perrysville, Pennsylvania, US
- Died: March 7, 1913 (aged 72); Harrisburg, Pennsylvania, US
- Military career
- Allegiance: United States
- Branch: United States Army: Union army
- Service years: 1861–1864
- Rank: Captain
- Nickname: Alex
- Units: Company K 8th Pennsylvania Regiment; Company A, 105th Pennsylvania Infantry
- Conflicts: American Civil War: Peninsula Campaign; Siege of Yorktown; Battle of Williamsburg; Battle of Fair Oaks/Seven Pines; Battle of Fredericksburg; Chancellorsville Campaign; Battle of Chancellorsville; Gettysburg campaign; Battle of Gettysburg; Mine Run Campaign; Overland Campaign; Battle of the Wilderness; Battle of Spotsylvania Court House; Siege of Petersburg
- Awards: Medal of Honor; Kearny Cross

Alexander H. Mitchell (November 13, 1840 – March 7, 1913) was a United States military officer who fought with the Union army during the American Civil War as captain of Company A of the 105th Pennsylvania Infantry. Wounded multiple times in combat during the war, he was awarded the Kearny Cross for his distinguished service in the Battle of Chancellorsville, Virginia in May 1863, and was then also awarded his nation’s highest award for valor, the U.S. Medal of Honor for his capture of a Confederate flag in hand-to-hand combat with the color-bearer of the 18th North Carolina Infantry during the Battle of Spotsylvania Court House on May 12, 1864.

The older brother of Pennsylvania State Senator James George Mitchell (1847–1919), Alexander H. Mitchell worked for the Commonwealth of Pennsylvania, serving as a messenger for the Pennsylvania Department of Internal Affairs from 1889 until his death in 1913.

== Formative years ==
Born in Perrysville, Pennsylvania on November 13, 1840, Alexander H. Mitchell was a son of Thomas Sharp Mitchell Sr. (1813–1883), a Jefferson County merchant who was a native of Elderton, Pennsylvania, and Hunterdon County native Sarah E. (Blose) Mitchell. He was raised in Allegheny County and educated in the public schools of his community with his siblings: Nancy (1831–1884), Andrew (1833–1863), Sarah Ann (1834–1894), Thomas Sharp Jr. (1838–1898), Rebecca A. (1842–1910), Martha J. (1844–1923), James George (1847–1919), Malinda (1849–1910), Laura (1852–1909), and Alice R. (1855–1932).

Known to family and friends as “Alex”, Mitchell resided in Jefferson County at the dawn of America’s Civil War.

== Civil War ==
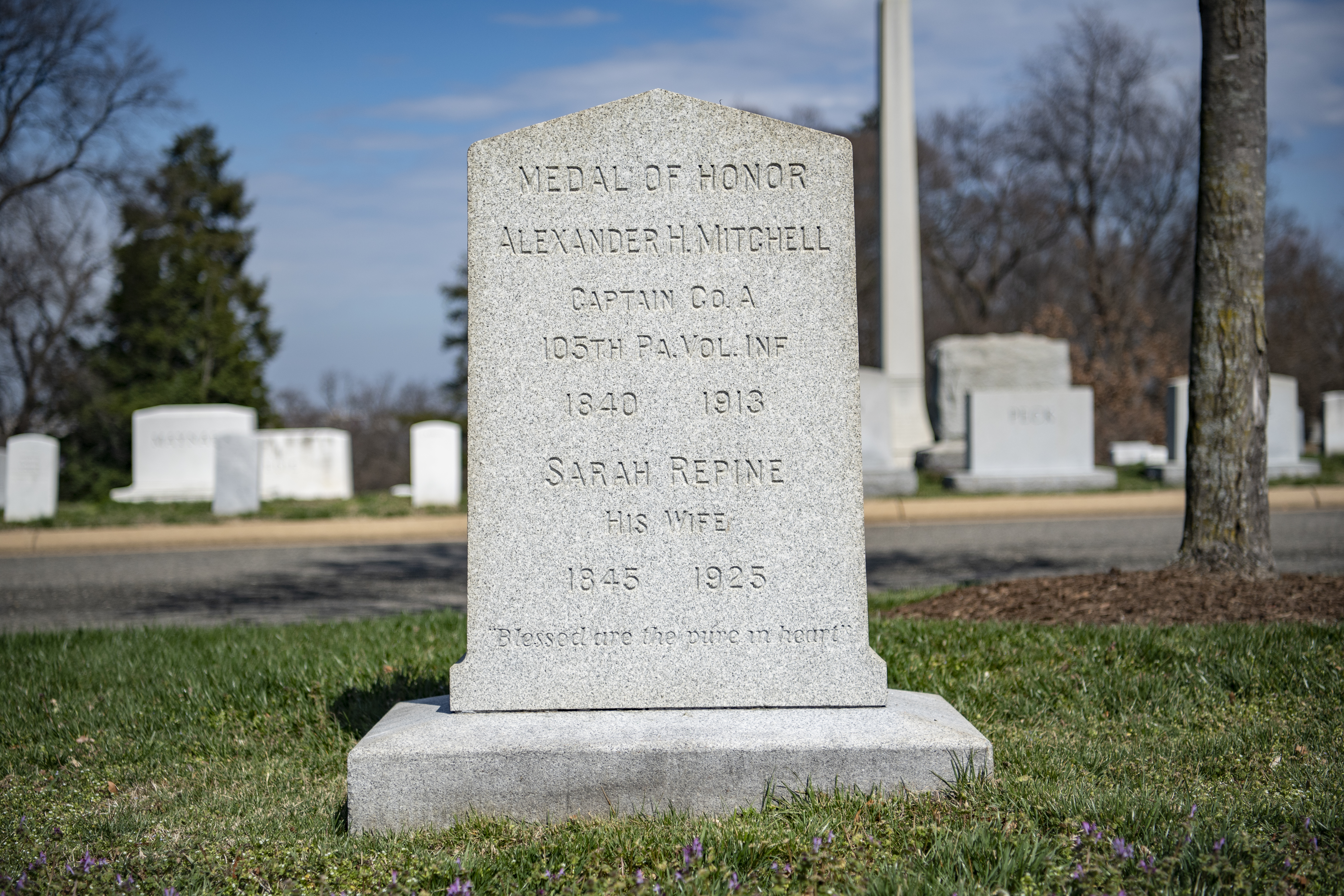
Grave at Arlington National Cemetery

On April 18, 1861, at the age of 20, Mitchell became one of Pennsylvania’s earliest responders to President Abraham Lincoln’s call for volunteers to help defend Washington, D.C. following the fall of Fort Sumter, on April 13 to Confederate States Army troops. After enrolling for Civil War military service that day (April 18) at Brookville, Pennsylvania, he then officially mustered in for duty at Harrisburg on April 24 as a private with Company K of the 8th Pennsylvania Infantry. Initially stationed at Camp Slifer, near Chambersburg, Mitchell and his regiment were attached to the 3rd Brigade, 1st Division before being moved, on June 7, to Greencastle and then south to the Washington, D.C., area, where they were assigned to guard duties along the Potomac River near Williamsport. Stationed near Martinsburg in July, the 8th Pennsylvania periodically engaged Confederate troops in small skirmishes, and then participated in the Union army’s advance on Bunker Hill and in operations near Charlestown later that month. Following the completion of his Three Months’ Service, Mitchell honorably mustered out with his regiment on July 29, 1861.

Mitchell then re-enlisted for another tour of duty — this time for a three-year term of service. After re-enrolling on September 9, 1861, in Brookville, he then re-mustered in Pittsburgh as a sergeant with Company A of the 105th Pennsylvania Infantry under his former commanding officer from the 8th Pennsylvania. Alex Mitchell's younger brother, James, also mustered in with him that same day, joining the same company of the 105th Pennsylvania as a drummer boy. Ordered again to defensive duties near Washington, D.C., in early October, Mitchell and his fellow 105th Pennsylvanians were transported south by railroad, and pitched their tents at Camp Kalorama on the Kalorama Heights outside of Georgetown, District of Columbia before relocating again — this time to Alexandria, Virginia, where they were assigned to the brigade led by Brigadier-General Charles Davis Jameson in the U.S. Army division commanded by Brigadier-General Samuel P. Heintzelman. On November 8, Mitchell was promoted to the rank of first sergeant. Reassigned to duties at Fortress Monroe on March 17, 1862, he and his regiment then engaged in their first significant combat during the Siege of Yorktown (April 5–May 4) and the Peninsula Campaign (March–July 1862), including the battles of Williamsburg (May 5) and Fair Oaks/Seven Pines (May 31), during which Mitchell was wounded in action. Reporting later on the battle, Jameson described how the day’s events unfolded:

All our men had fled from the abattis [sic] in the vicinity of the Richmond Road. Our only alternative was to make the best stand possible with the handful of men under Colonel McKnight. We led them across the open field and up the Richmond Road into the abattis, at a double quick, and under a most terrific fire, deploying one-half on either side of the road. For more than an hour and a half this small force held every inch of ground. At last the enemy broke and ran, and McKnight pursued them through Casey’s old camp…. Just as McKnight succeeded in routing the force in his front, our line gave way entirely … and the rebel force came pouring into the Richmond Road directly in his rear, and while the gallant McKnight was pursuing the South Carolina chivalry towards Richmond, the rebel forces directly in his rear were pursuing a portion of our forces toward the Chickahominy. I then received orders to withdraw my men if possible. With great difficulty they succeeded in filing off to the left in the woods toward White Oak Swamp, retreating along the edge of the swamp back to our second line of defences.

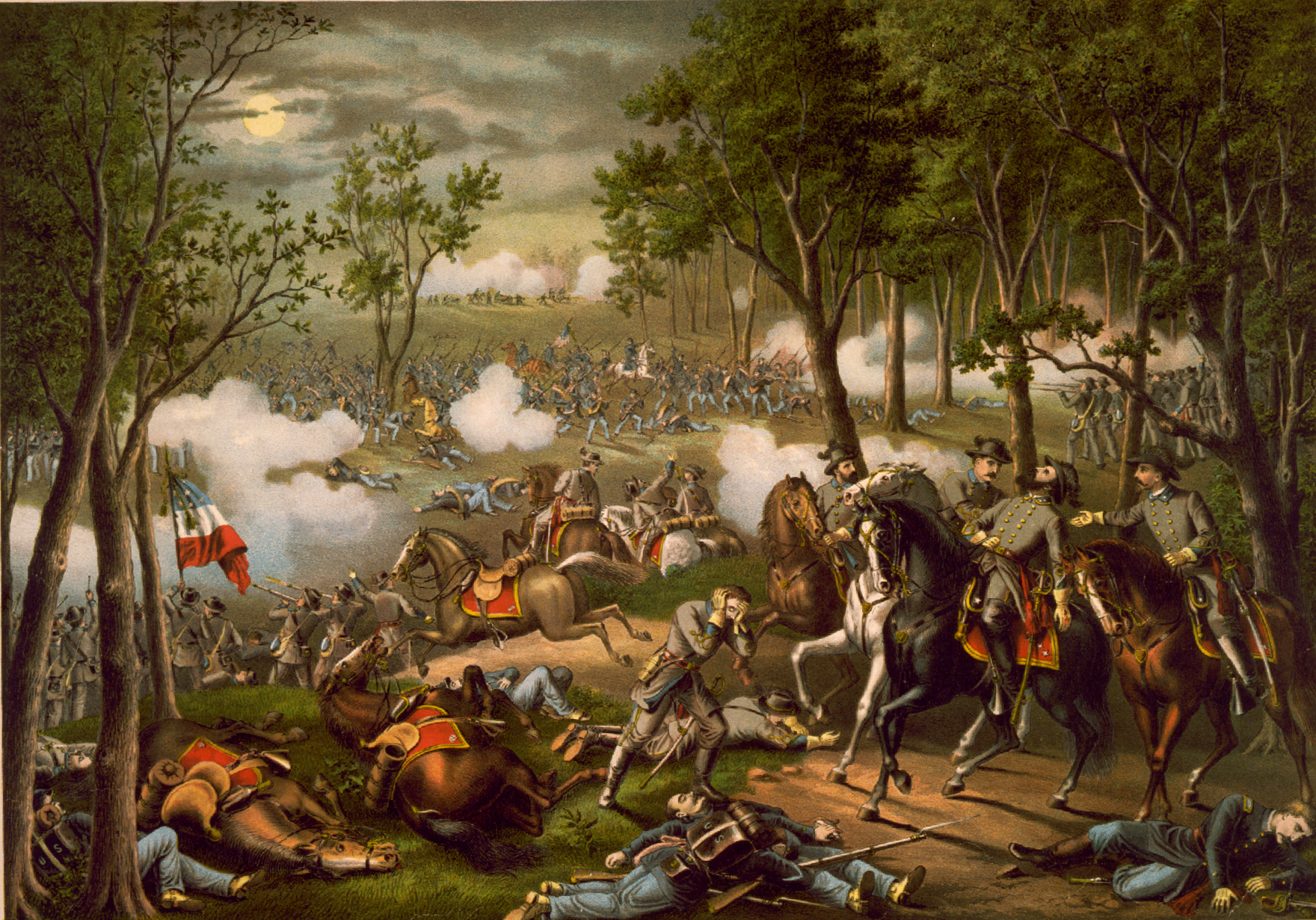
Battle of Chancellorsville, Virginia, May 5–7, 1863.

After fighting with his regiment in final days of the Battle of Fredericksburg in December 1862, Mitchell was commissioned as a second lieutenant on January 15, 1863. Now part of the 3rd Corps of the Army of the Potomac, he and his men were next engaged in the Chancellorsville Campaign from April 30 to May 6. After the Battle of Chancellorsville, Mitchell was advanced in rank again (on May 9, 1863; alternate date May 4) with a commission to first lieutenant. On May 27, Brigadier-General Daniel Sickles presented him with the Kearny Badge (the Kearny Cross), “a red diamond that was the very symbol of courage in the Army of the Potomac,” according to historian Charles LaRocca.

While assigned with his regiment to the Gettysburg campaign, Mitchell was then wounded in action again during the Battle of Gettysburg, where he and his fellow 105th Pennsylvanians were on the front lines of the intense fighting at Little Round Top from July 2–3. Following his second period of recuperation, he returned to service with the 105th Pennsylvania. In a post-battle letter, Colonel Calvin A. Craig of the 105th Pennsylvania wrote:

The One Hundred and Fifth never fought so well as at Gettysburg. We rallied some eight or ten times after the rest of the brigade had left us, and the boys fought like demons. Their battle-cry was “Pennsylvania”. I could handle them just as well on that field of battle as though they had simply been on drill. This is a state of perfection in discipline that is gained by but few regiments.

After recuperating from his wounds, Mitchell again returned to his regiment, which continued operations against Confederate troops in Virginia from the late summer through early winter. Briefly under heavy fire near Locust Grove in November 1863, they then participated in the Mine Run Campaign from November 27 to December 2. Moved to winter quarters at Brandy Station later that month, the majority of 105th Pennsylvanians were then awarded veterans’ furloughs after re-enlisting. Departing winter quarters on May 4, 1864, Mitchell and his regiment were assigned to the Overland Campaign of Lieutenant-General Ulysses S. Grant, which immediately brought them under fire in the Battle of the Wilderness (May 5–7). On May 7, Mitchell was commissioned, but not mustered as a captain, and placed in charge of Company A.

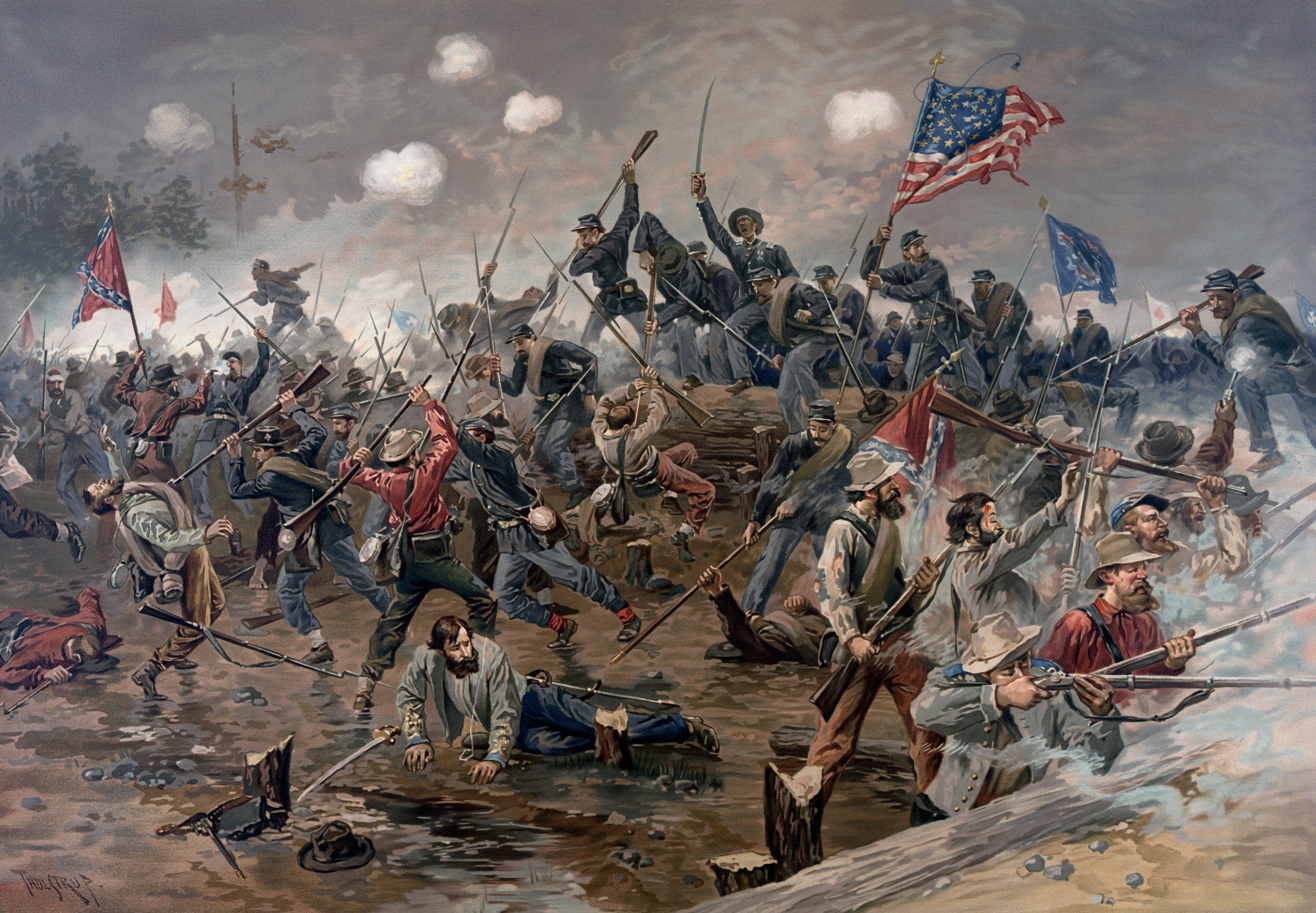
Battle of Spotsylvania Court House, Virginia, May 12, 1864 (Thure de Thulstrup).

It was then that Mitchell performed the act of valor which ultimately resulted in his being awarded the U.S. Medal of Honor. On May 12, 1864, while leading his men as first lieutenant of A Company with the 105th Pennsylvania Infantry, in the Battle of Spotsylvania Court House, Mitchell was wounded in action while capturing the enemy’s flag during a hand-to-hand encounter with the color-bearer of the 18th North Carolina Infantry (Confederate States Army).

Following his recuperation, Mitchell was then wounded in action again on June 16, 1864, during the Siege of Petersburg. Treated for his injuries but deemed not well enough to continue serving, he was discharged honorably on a surgeon’s certificate of disability on November 15.

== Post-war life ==
Following his honorable discharge from the military, Alexander H. Mitchell secured employment in the oil industry in Burning Springs, West Virginia, and then returned home to Pennsylvania where, in 1866, he married Sarah (Repine) Mitchell (1845–1925). Employed as a well engineer in 1870, he resided with his wife and children, Cecil (born circa 1867) and Jane/June (born 1870), in Oil City, Pennsylvania.

Their children Ross Tyson and Clara were born, respectively, in October 1880 and November 1885. During this decade, he and his family resided in Indiana, Pennsylvania In 1889, they relocated to Harrisburg in Dauphin County when Mitchell began work as a messenger for the Pennsylvania Department of Internal Affairs. After the turn of the century Mitchell continued to live in Harrisburg with his wife, their son Ross, who was employed as an artist, and daughter Clara. According to the federal census taker, he and his wife had had eight children together, only three of whom were still alive by 1900.

== Illness, death and interment ==
In later life, Mitchell developed heart disease and dropsy which ultimately led to his being confined to bed during the final year of his life. He died at the age of 72 on March 7, 1913, at his home in Harrisburg, Pennsylvania. Mitchell was buried at Arlington National Cemetery, in Arlington, Virginia.

== Medal of Honor citation ==
Rank and organization: First Lieutenant, Company A, 105th Pennsylvania Infantry. Place and date: At Spotsylvania, Virginia, May 12, 1864. Birth: Perryville, Pa. Date of issue: March 27, 1890. Citation:

The President of the United States of America, in the name of Congress, takes pleasure in presenting the Medal of Honor to First Lieutenant (Infantry) Alexander H. Mitchell, United States Army, for extraordinary heroism on May 12, 1864, while serving with Company I, 105th Pennsylvania Infantry, in action at Spotsylvania, Virginia, for capture of the flag of the 18th North Carolina Infantry (Confederate States of America), in a personal encounter with the Color Bearer.

== See also ==
- Army of the Potomac
- Battle of Gettysburg, Second Day
- List of American Civil War Medal of Honor recipients: M–P
- Pennsylvania in the American Civil War
