= Battle of Seven Pines order of battle: Confederate =

The following Confederate States Army units and commanders fought in the Battle of Seven Pines of the American Civil War. The Union order of battle is shown separately.

== Abbreviations used ==
=== Military rank ===
- Gen = General
- MG = Major General
- BG = Brigadier General
- Col = Colonel
- Ltc = Lieutenant Colonel
- Maj = Major
- Cpt = Captain

=== Other ===
- (w) = wounded
- (mw) = mortally wounded
- (k) = killed in action
- (c) = captured

== Army of Northern Virginia ==
Gen Joseph E. Johnston (w)
MG Gustavus W. Smith
Gen Robert E. Lee

=== Left Wing ===
MG Gustavus W. Smith

Division	Brigade	Regiments and Others
Smith's Division; BG William H.C. Whiting	Hood's Brigade BG John B. Hood	18th Georgia: 1st Texas: Col Alexis T. Rainey; 4th Texas: Col John Marshall; 5th Texas: Col James J. Archer
Smith's Division; BG William H.C. Whiting	Hampton's Brigade BG Wade Hampton (w)	14th Georgia; 19th Georgia; 16th North Carolina; Hampton's (South Carolina) Legion: Ltc Martin W. Gary; Madison Louisiana Light Artillery: Cpt George V. Moody
Smith's Division; BG William H.C. Whiting	Whiting's Brigade Col Evander M. Law	4th Alabama; 2nd Mississippi; 11th Mississippi; 6th North Carolina: Col William Dorsey Pender; Balthis' (Virginia) Battery
Smith's Division; BG William H.C. Whiting	Pettigrew's Brigade BG J. Johnston Pettigrew (w&c)	2nd Arkansas Battalion; 35th Georgia; 22nd North Carolina; 47th Virginia; Andrew's (Maryland) Battery
Smith's Division; BG William H.C. Whiting	Hatton's Brigade BG Robert H. Hatton (k)	1st Tennessee (Provisional Army); 7th Tennessee; 14th Tennessee; Braxton's (Virginia) Battery
A.P. Hill's Division; MG A.P. Hill	Field's Brigade BG Charles W. Field	40th Virginia; 55th Virginia; 22nd Virginia Battalion; Pegram's (Virginia) Battery
A.P. Hill's Division; MG A.P. Hill	J. R. Anderson's Brigade BG Joseph R. Anderson	45th Georgia; 49th Georgia; 34th North Carolina; 38th North Carolina; 3rd Louisiana Battalion; McIntosh's (South Carolina) Battery; Crenshaw's (Virginia) Battery
A.P. Hill's Division; MG A.P. Hill	Gregg's Brigade BG Maxcy Gregg	1st South Carolina (Provisional Army); 1st South Carolina Rifles; 12th South Carolina; 13th South Carolina; 14th South Carolina; Davidson's (Virginia) Battery
A.P. Hill's Division; MG A.P. Hill	Branch's Brigade BG Lawrence O'Bryan Branch	7th North Carolina; 12th North Carolina; 18th North Carolina; 28th North Carolina; 33rd North Carolina; 37th North Carolina; Branch's (North Carolina) Battery; Johnson's (Virginia) Battery

=== Right Wing ===
MG James Longstreet

Division	Brigade	Regiments and Others
Longstreet's Division; BG Richard H. Anderson	A. P. Hill's (old) Brigade Col James L. Kemper	1st Virginia; 7th Virginia; 11th Virginia; 17th Virginia: Col Montgomery D. Corse; Roger's (Virginia) Battery
Longstreet's Division; BG Richard H. Anderson	R. H. Anderson's Brigade Col Micah Jenkins (w)	5th South Carolina: Col John R.R. Giles (k), Ltc Andrew Jackson; 6th South Carolina: Col John Bratton (w&c), Ltc John M. Steedman; 4th South Carolina (Battalion); Palmetto (South Carolina) Sharpshooters: Maj William Anderson; 1st Louisiana Zouave Battalion: Ltc Georges A. G. De Coppens; St. Paul's (Louisiana) Foot Rifles; Stribling's (Virginia) Battery: Cpt Robert M. Stribling
Longstreet's Division; BG Richard H. Anderson	Pickett's Brigade BG George E. Pickett	8th Virginia: Ltc Norborne Berkeley; 18th Virginia: Col Robert E. Withers; 19th Virginia: Col John B. Strange; 28th Virginia: Col William Watts; Dearing's (Virginia) Battery: Cpt James Dearing
Longstreet's Division; BG Richard H. Anderson	Wilcox's Brigade BG Cadmus M. Wilcox	9th Alabama: Ltc Stephen F. Hale; 10th Alabama: Maj John J. Woodward; 11th Alabama: Col Sydenham Moore (mw); 19th Mississippi: Maj John Mullins; 3rd Company, Stanard's (Virginia) Howitzers
Longstreet's Division; BG Richard H. Anderson	Colston's Brigade BG Raleigh E. Colston	3rd Virginia; 13th North Carolina; 14th North Carolina
Longstreet's Division; BG Richard H. Anderson	Pryor's Brigade BG Roger A. Pryor	8th Alabama; 14th Alabama; 14th Louisiana; 32nd Virginia; Macon's (Virginia) Battery
Longstreet's Division; BG Richard H. Anderson	Artillery	Donaldsonville Louisiana Artillery: Cpt Victor Maurin; 2nd Company, Brown's (Virginia) Howitzers: Cpt David Watson
D. H. Hill's Division; MG D. H. Hill	Rodes' Brigade BG Robert E. Rodes (w); Col John B. Gordon	5th Alabama: Col Christopher C. Pegues; 6th Alabama: Col John B. Gordon; 12th Alabama: Col Robert T. Jones (k), Ltc Bristor B. Gayle; 12th Mississippi: Col William H. Taylor; 4th Virginia Heavy Artillery; Carter's (Virginia) Battery: Cpt Thomas H. Carter
D. H. Hill's Division; MG D. H. Hill	Featherston's Brigade Col George B. Anderson	27th Georgia: Col Levi B. Smith (w), Ltc Charles T. Zachary; 28th Georgia: Cpt John N. Wilcox; 4th North Carolina: Maj Bryan Grimes; 49th Virginia: Col William "Extra Billy" Smith (w)
D. H. Hill's Division; MG D. H. Hill	Garland's Brigade BG Samuel Garland, Jr.	5th North Carolina: Col Daniel H. Christie, Ltc Robert D. Johnson (w); 23rd North Carolina; 24th Virginia: Maj Richard L. Maury (w); 38th Virginia: Col Edward C. Edmonds; 2nd Florida: Col Edward A. Perry; 2nd Mississippi Battalion: Ltc John G. Taylor; Bondurant's Battery: Cpt James W. Bondurant
D. H. Hill's Division; MG D. H. Hill	Rains' Brigade BG Gabriel J. Rains (w)	13th Alabama: Col Birkett D. Fry (w); 26th Alabama Col Edward A. O'Neal (w); 6th Georgia; 23rd Georgia
D. H. Hill's Division; MG D. H. Hill	Wise's Brigade BG Henry A. Wise	26th Virginia; 47th Virginia; Armistead's (Virginia) Battery; French's (Virginia) Battery
D. H. Hill's Division; MG D. H. Hill	Artillery	Hardway's (Alabama) Battery; Rhett's (South Carolina) Battery
Huger's Division; MG Benjamin Huger	Mahone Brigade BG William Mahone	3rd Alabama: Col Tennent Lomax (k); 12th Virginia; 41st Virginia
Huger's Division; MG Benjamin Huger	Blanchard's Brigade BG Albert G. Blanchard	3rd Georgia; 4th Georgia; 22nd Georgia; 1st Louisiana; Huger's (Virginia) Battery
Huger's Division; MG Benjamin Huger	Armistead's Brigade BG Lewis A. Armistead	9th Virginia: Col David J. Godwin (w); 14th Virginia; 53rd Virginia: Col Harrison B. Tomlin; 5th Virginia Battalion; Turner's (Virginia) Battery

=== Reserve ===
MG John B. Magruder

Division	Brigade	Regiments and Others
McLaws' Division; MG Lafayette McLaws	Semmes' Brigade BG Paul J. Semmes	5th Louisiana; 10th Louisiana; 10th Georgia; 15th Virginia; Noland's (Virginia) Battalion
McLaws' Division; MG Lafayette McLaws	Griffith's Brigade BG Richard Griffith	13th Mississippi; 18th Mississippi; 21st Mississippi; McCarthy's (Virginia) Richmond Howitzers
Jones' Division; BG David R. Jones	Toombs' Brigade BG Robert Toombs	1st Georgia; 2nd Georgia; 15th Georgia; 17th Georgia; 20th Georgia; 38th Georgia
Jones' Division; BG David R. Jones	Anderson's Brigade Col George T. Anderson	7th Georgia; 8th Georgia; 9th Georgia; 11th Georgia; 1st Kentucky
