= Clinton Grove Cemetery =

- U.S. National Register of Historic Places
- Michigan State Historic Site
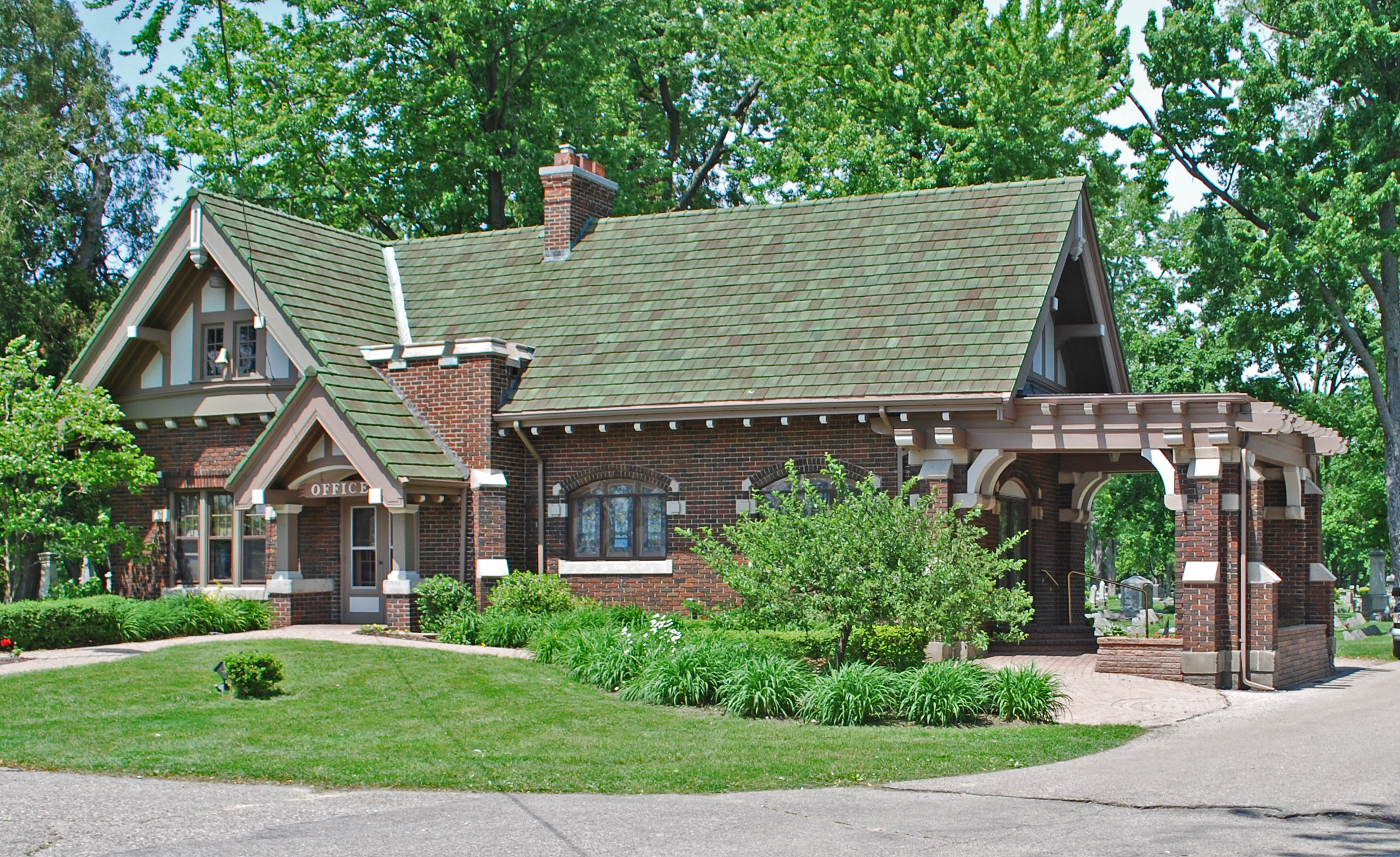
- Office building
- Interactive map
- Location: 21189 Cass Ave., Clinton Township, Macomb County, Michigan
- Coordinates: 42°36′10″N 82°54′13″W
- Built: 1855
- Architect: Theophilus Van Damme
- Architectural style: Tudor revival
- NRHP reference No.: 96000807

Significant dates
- Added to NRHP: July 25, 1996
- Designated MSHS: February 29, 1996

The Clinton Grove Cemetery is a cemetery located at 21189 Cass Avenue in Clinton Township, Macomb County, Michigan, United States. It was listed on the National Register of Historic Places and designated a Michigan State Historic Site in 1996.

== History ==
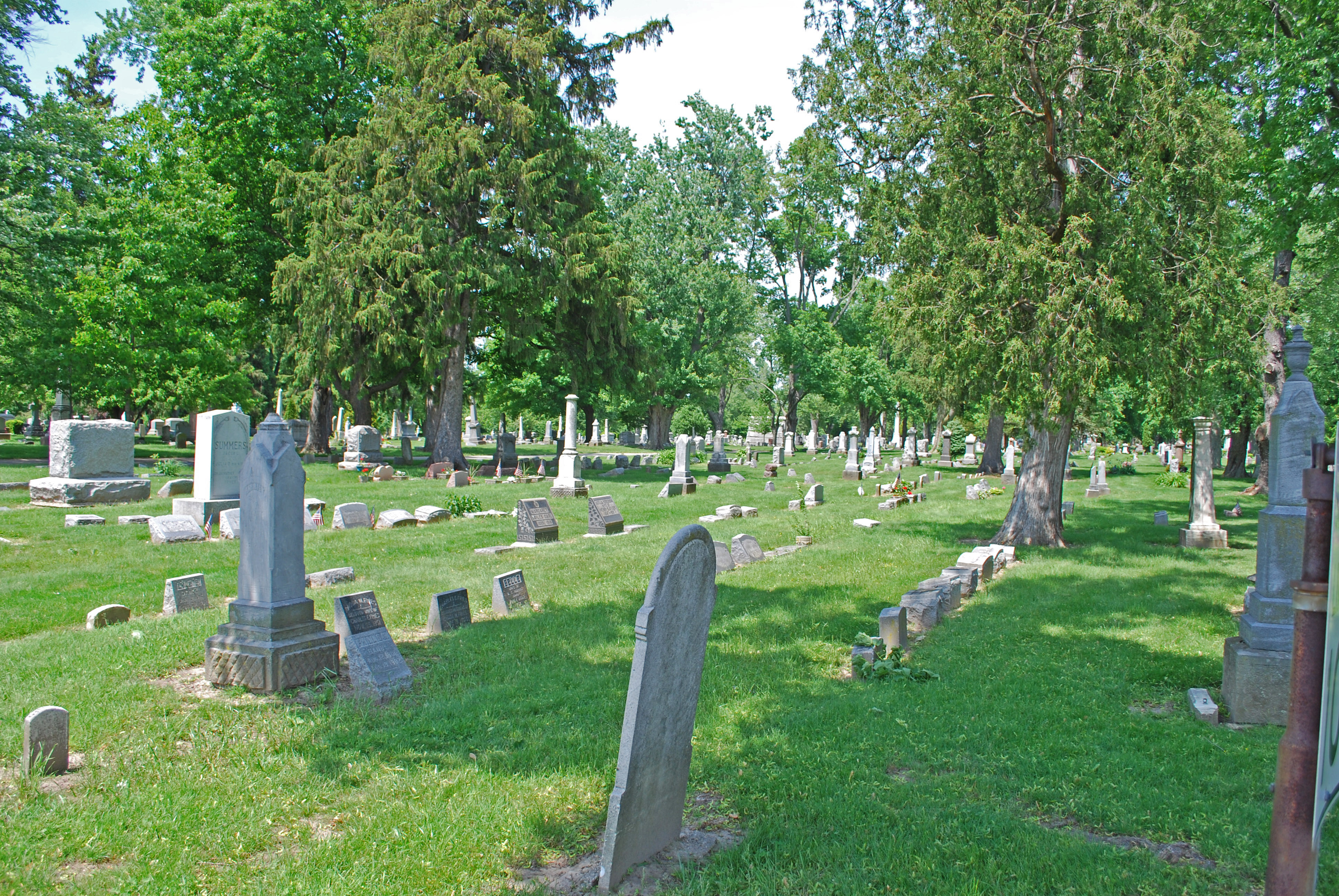
Cemetery landscape

The Clinton Grove Cemetery Association was established on March 30, 1855 as a non-sectarian, non-profit association. The cemetery started on a five-acre parcel, which has been increased to 50 acres through a series of purchases. In 1885, a caretaker's house was constructed on the property, and in 1914 a Tudor office and chapel building were added, both designed by Mount Clemens architect Theophilus Van Damme.

== Description ==
The Clinton Grove Cemetery is located on 50 acres west of Mt. Clemens. Over 19,000 graves are located on the property, as well as an office, chapel, mausoleum, and caretaker's house. Both the office and chapel were designed by architect Theopolis Van Damme. Family mausoleums and crypts are scattered among the in-ground burials, as well as a wide variety of 19th and early 20th century monuments. Over 570 trees grow in the cemetery, many over 100 years old. The cemetery is an outstanding example of an urban, park-like memorial burial ground, retaining the feel of a Victorian-era rural cemetery through both landscaping and the variety and quality of its gravemarkers.

== Notable interments ==
- Henry Dwight Terry (1812–1869), Union Army Brigadier General during the American Civil War
- Edgar Weeks (1839–1904), U.S. Congressman (1899–1903)
