= 93rd New York Infantry Regiment =

- Active: October 1861 - June 29, 1865
- Country: United States
- Allegiance: Union
- Branch: Infantry
- Nickname: Morgan Rifles
- Engagements: Siege of Yorktown; Battle of Williamsburg; Seven Days Battles; Battle of South Mountain; Battle of Antietam; Battle of Fredericksburg; Battle of Chancellorsville; Battle of Gettysburg; Bristoe Campaign; Mine Run Campaign; Battle of the Wilderness; Battle of Spotsylvania Court House; Battle of North Anna; Battle of Cold Harbor; Siege of Petersburg; Second Battle of Petersburg; First Battle of Deep Bottom; Second Battle of Deep Bottom; Battle of Peebles' Farm; Battle of Hatcher's Run; Appomattox Campaign; Battle of Sailor's Creek

The 93rd New York Infantry Regiment (a.k.a. "Morgan Rifles") was an infantry regiment in the Union Army during the American Civil War.

== Service ==
The 93rd New York Infantry was organized at Albany, New York between October 1861 and January 1862, and mustered in for three years service under the command of Colonel John S. Crocker.

The regiment was attached to 3rd Brigade, 3rd Division, IV Corps, Army of the Potomac, to May 18, 1862. Provost Guard, Army of the Potomac, to April 1864. 2nd Brigade, 3rd Division, II Corps, Army of the Potomac, to June 1865.

The 93rd New York Infantry mustered out of service on June 27, 1865.

== Timeline of Service ==
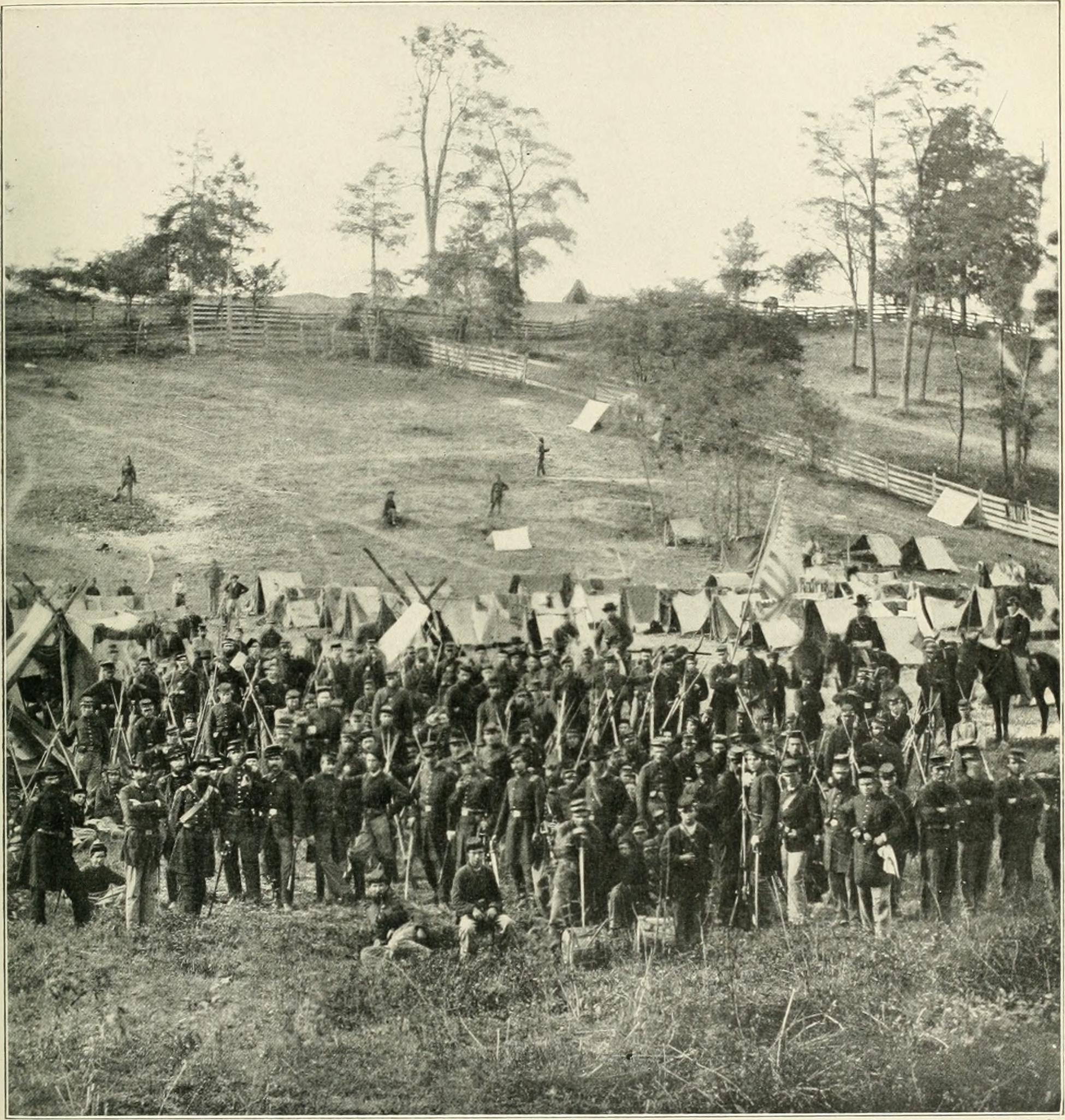
1862 in Maryland, shortly before the Battle of Antietam

February 17, 1862 - Moved to New York City.

March 7, 1862 - Departed New York City and arrived in Washington, D.C.

March 30, 1862 - Embarked at Alexandria, Virginia for the Virginia Peninsula.

April 5 to May 4, 1862 - The Siege of Yorktown.

April 29, 1862 - Sent on reconnaissance towards Lee's Mills, Virginia.

May 5, 1862 - The Battle of Williamsburg.

May 20–23, 1862 - Companies A, F, H, and K were sent on operations about Bottom's Bridge.

May 19 to June 25, 1862 - Companies B, C, D, E, G, and I held duty at White House Landing.

June 25 to July 1, 1862 - The Battle of Seven Days.

July 2, 1862 - Operations about White House Landing.

September 6–22, 1862 - The Maryland Campaign.

September 14, 1862 - The Battle of South Mountain.

September 17, 1862 - The Battle of Antietam.

December 12–15, 1862 - The Battle of Fredericksburg.

January 20-14, 1863 - "The Mud March".

April 27 to May 6, 1863 - The Chancellorsville Campaign.

May 1–5, 1863 - The Battle of Chancellorsville.

June 11 to July 24, 1863 - The Gettysburg Campaign.

July 1–3, 1863 - The Battle of Gettysburg.

July to October 1863 - Guard duty along the Rappahannock River.

October 9–22, 1863 - The Bristoe Campaign.

November 7–8, 1863 - Advance to line of the Rappahannock.

November 26 to December 2, 1863 - The Mine Run Campaign.

May 3 to June 15, 1864 - Campaign from the Rapidan River to the James River.

May 5–7, 1864 - The Battle of the Wilderness.

May 12–21, 1864 - The Battle of Spotsylvania Court House.

June 1–12, 1864 - The Battle of Cold Harbor.

June 16, 1864 to April 2, 1865 - The Siege of Petersburg.

April 9, 1865 - The Battle of Appomattox Court House.

April 11–13, 1865 - March to Burkesville.

May 2–15, 1865 - March to Washington, D.C.

May 23, 1865 - The Grand Review of the Armies.

== Casualties ==
The regiment lost a total of 258 men during service; 6 officers and 120 enlisted men killed or mortally wounded, 2 officers and 130 enlisted men died of disease.

== Commanders ==
- Colonel John S. Crocker - captured April 29, 1862; exchanged and resumed command of the regiment January 1, 1864
- Colonel Samuel McConihe
- Colonel Haviland Gifford

== See also ==
- List of New York Civil War regiments
- New York in the Civil War
