= 105th Pennsylvania Infantry Regiment =

Union Army volunteer infantry regiment

105th Regiment Pennsylvania Volunteer Infantry
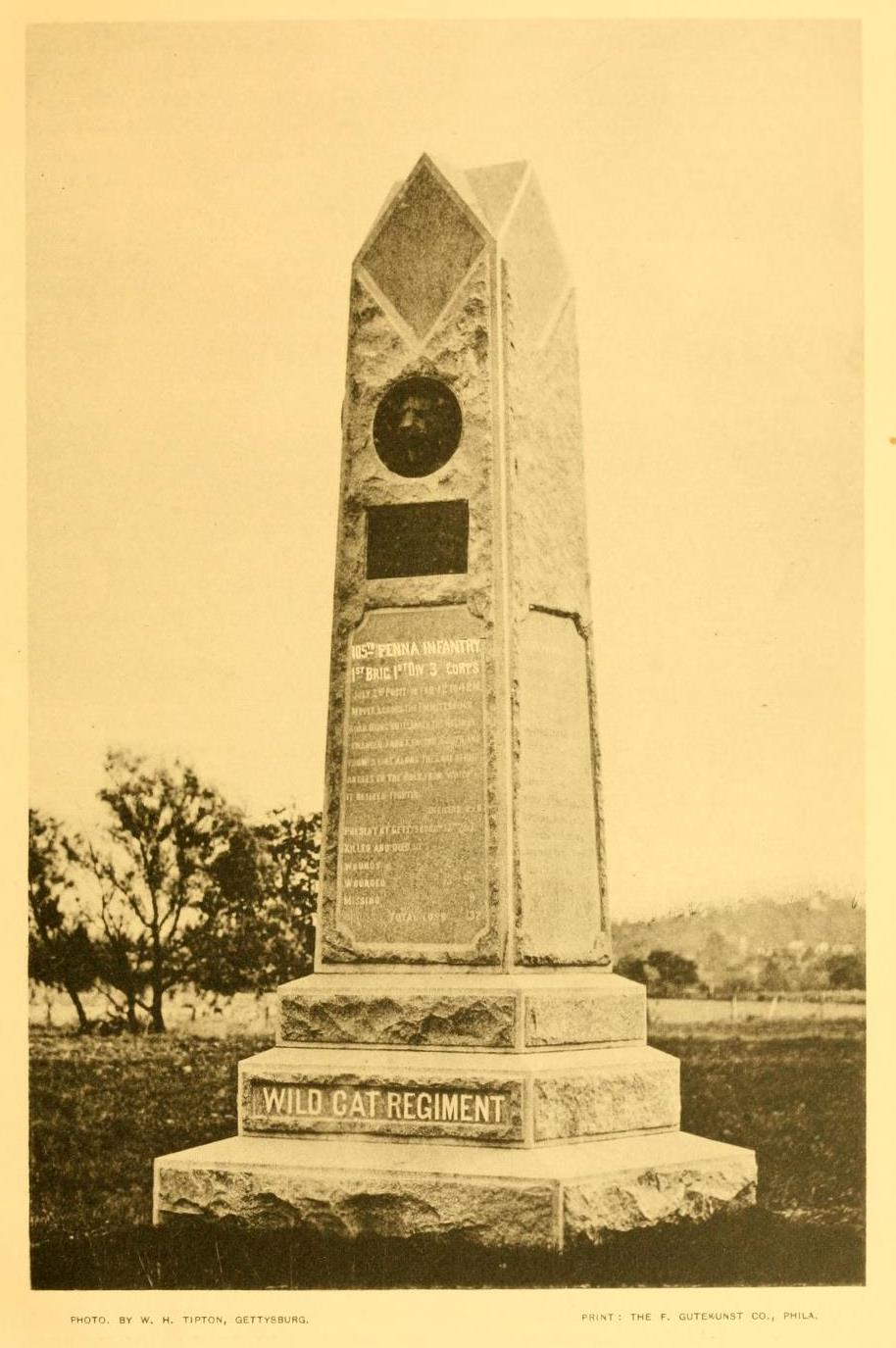
- 105th Pennsylvania Infantry Monument, Gettysburg, Pennsylvania, 1893
- Active: October 1861 to July 11, 1865
- Country: United States
- Allegiance: Union
- Branch: Infantry
- Size: 1,992
- Nickname: "Wildcat Regiment"
- Engagements: Battle of Williamsburg; Battle of Seven Pines; Battle of Glendale; Battle of Malvern Hill; Battle of Chancellorsville; Battle of Gettysburg; Battle of the Wilderness; Battle of Spotsylvania Court House; First Battle of Deep Bottom

The 105th Pennsylvania Volunteer Infantry (also known as the "Wildcat Regiment") was an infantry regiment which served in the Union Army during the American Civil War. Among the regiment's early recruits was future United States Congressman Albert C. Thompson.

== History ==
=== Organization and early battles ===
The 105th Pennsylvania Infantry was founded by Amor McKnight, a lawyer and resident of Brookville, Pennsylvania, who became one of the state's earliest responders to President Abraham Lincoln's call for volunteers to defend Washington, D.C. following the fall of Fort Sumter to Confederate States Army troops in mid-April 1861. After honorably completing his three months' service as captain of Company I with the 8th Pennsylvania Infantry and honorably mustering out on July 29, 1861, McKnight was then authorized by the state in early August to raise a new regiment. Recruiting for the 105th Pennsylvania then began and was completed that same month. Nicknamed the "Wildcat Regiment" in recognition of the unit's large membership from the Wildcat Congressional District in Jefferson, the 105th Pennsylvania was also staffed by a large contingent of men from Clarion County. Commissioned as a colonel, McKnight was placed in charge of the regiment after its men mustered in at Pittsburgh on September 9, 1861. Serving under him as field and staff officers were: W. W. Corbett, lieutenant colonel, and M. M. Dick, major.

The regimental band was a 24-piece brass ensemble whose members ranged in age from 19 to 43. It was conducted and commanded by Calvin B. Clark.

Ordered to support the defenses of Washington, the regiment was transported south that fall and initially pitched its tents at Camp Kalorama on the Kalorama Heights in Georgetown, District of Columbia before it was reassigned to the 1st Brigade, 1st Division, III Corps and moved to Camp Jameson, which was located roughly a mile south of Alexandria, Virginia on the farm of Revolutionary War patriot George Mason.

Leaving camp on March 17, 1862, the regiment took part in the siege of Yorktown and the battles of Williamsburg and Fair Oaks. In the latter engagement, the troops fought like veterans, holding their position unsupported until nearly surrounded. Three companies were on special duty at the opening of the action and, being unable to reach the regiment in its exposed position, fought with the 57th Pennsylvania Infantry. After a month spent on picket duty, the 105th was again in action at Glendale and Malvern Hill, and, by the time it reached Harrison's Landing, the ranks were so reduced by wounds and sickness that less than 100 men were fit for active duty.

While posted along the railroad between Manassas and Warrenton Junction, companies B, G, and H were captured by the Confederates. The 1st and Hooker's divisions were engaged at Bristoe Station on August 29. The following day, the entire army was in action at Second Bull Run, where once more, the gallant work of the 105th resulted in significant losses. The regiment was specially complimented by Maj. Gen. Philip Kearny for its gallantry. September and October were spent in Washington. The command left the nation's capital on October 28 and, after some scouting near Leesburg, arrived at Falmouth on November 24. The 105th's next battle was at Fredericksburg, after which it spent the winter in camp near Brandy Station.

=== 1863 and 1864 battles and campaigns ===
At the Battle of Chancellorsville in May 1863, the troops were warmly engaged, and many won the Kearny Medal of Honor (the Kearny Cross). The first two weeks of June were spent at Banks Ford, and then the troops started northward. At the Battle of Gettysburg, the regiment lost many men, and, after the return to Virginia, engagements followed at Auburn, Kelly's Ford, and Locust Grove in the Mine Run campaign late in November. At the end of that campaign, the regiment returned to the camp at Brandy Station for the winter, and, on December 28, 1863, nearly the entire regiment re-enlisted.

The regiment fought at the battles of the Wilderness and Spotsylvania in May 1864, during which Capt. Alexander H. Mitchell, who had previously been awarded the Kearny Badge for his distinguished service at Chancellorsville, was wounded in action while capturing the enemy's flag during a hand-to-hand encounter with the color-bearer of the 18th North Carolina Infantry, a second act of valor for which Mitchell would later be awarded the U.S. Medal of Honor.

The regiment then moved to Petersburg with the army, where it took part in the operations of the X Corps in August and the movements upon the Wilmington and Weldon Railroad in October and December. On September 5, the remainder of the 63rd was added to the regiment.

=== The end of the war ===
On February 20, 1865, the 105th absorbed Company C of the 2nd United States Volunteer Sharpshooter Regiment, which was disbanded on that date, and in March 1865, about 300 recruits were received. At Sailor's Creek, the 105th was actively engaged, after which it returned to Alexandria. It participated in the Grand Review of the Armies at Washington and was mustered out in that city on July 11, 1865.

Out of a total enrollment of 2,040, the regiment lost 309 men by death from wounds or disease, and 199 soldiers were reported as missing.

== Senior officers ==
- Colonels
  - Amor A. McKnight
  - William W. Corbett
  - Calvin A. Craig
  - James Miller
- Lieutenant Colonels
  - William W. Corbett
  - Calvin A. Craig
  - J. W. Greenawalt
  - L. B. Duff
  - Oliver C. Reddie
- Majors
  - Mungo M. Dick
  - J. W. Greenawalt
  - Levi B. Duff
  - John C. Conser
  - James Miller

== Other notable members ==
- Alexander H. Mitchell (captain, company A): Recipient of the Kearny Cross and U.S. Medal of Honor
- James George Mitchell (drummer boy and private, company A): Pennsylvania State Senator, 1893–1900

== See also ==
- Pennsylvania in the Civil War
- List of Pennsylvania Civil War regiments

== Monuments and other memorials ==
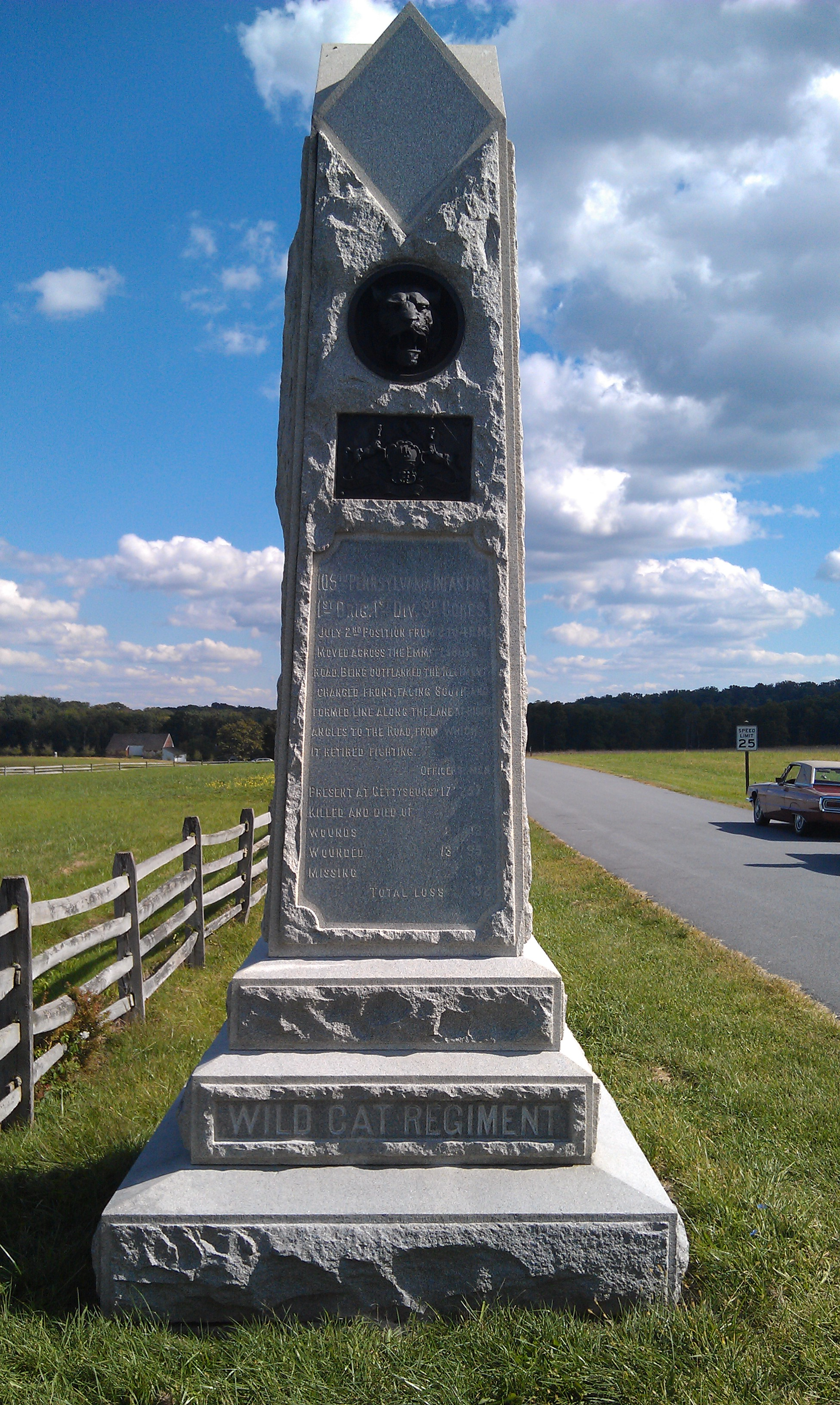
105th Pennsylvania Infantry Monument, Gettysburg National Battlefield

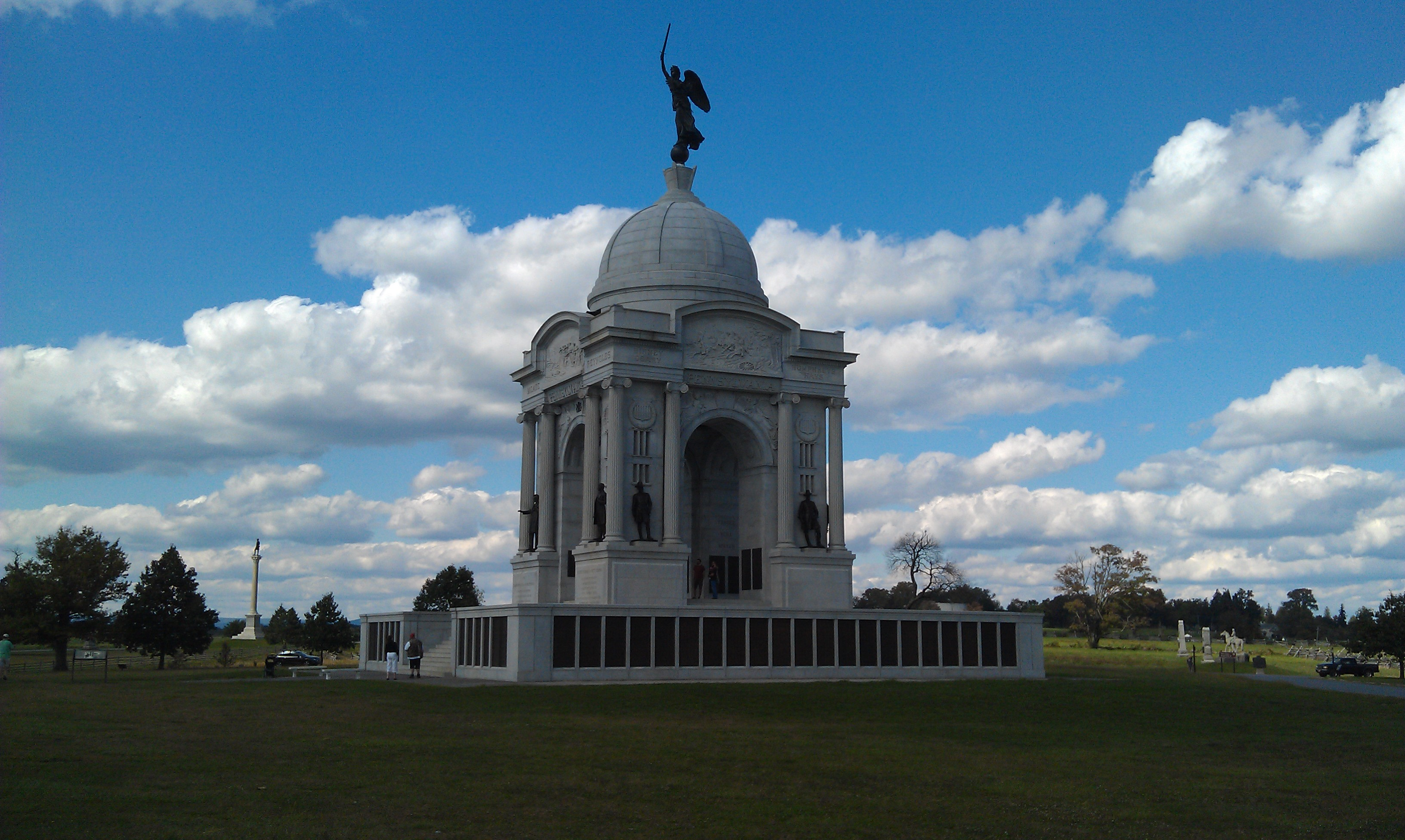
Pennsylvania State Memorial, Gettysburg National Battlefield

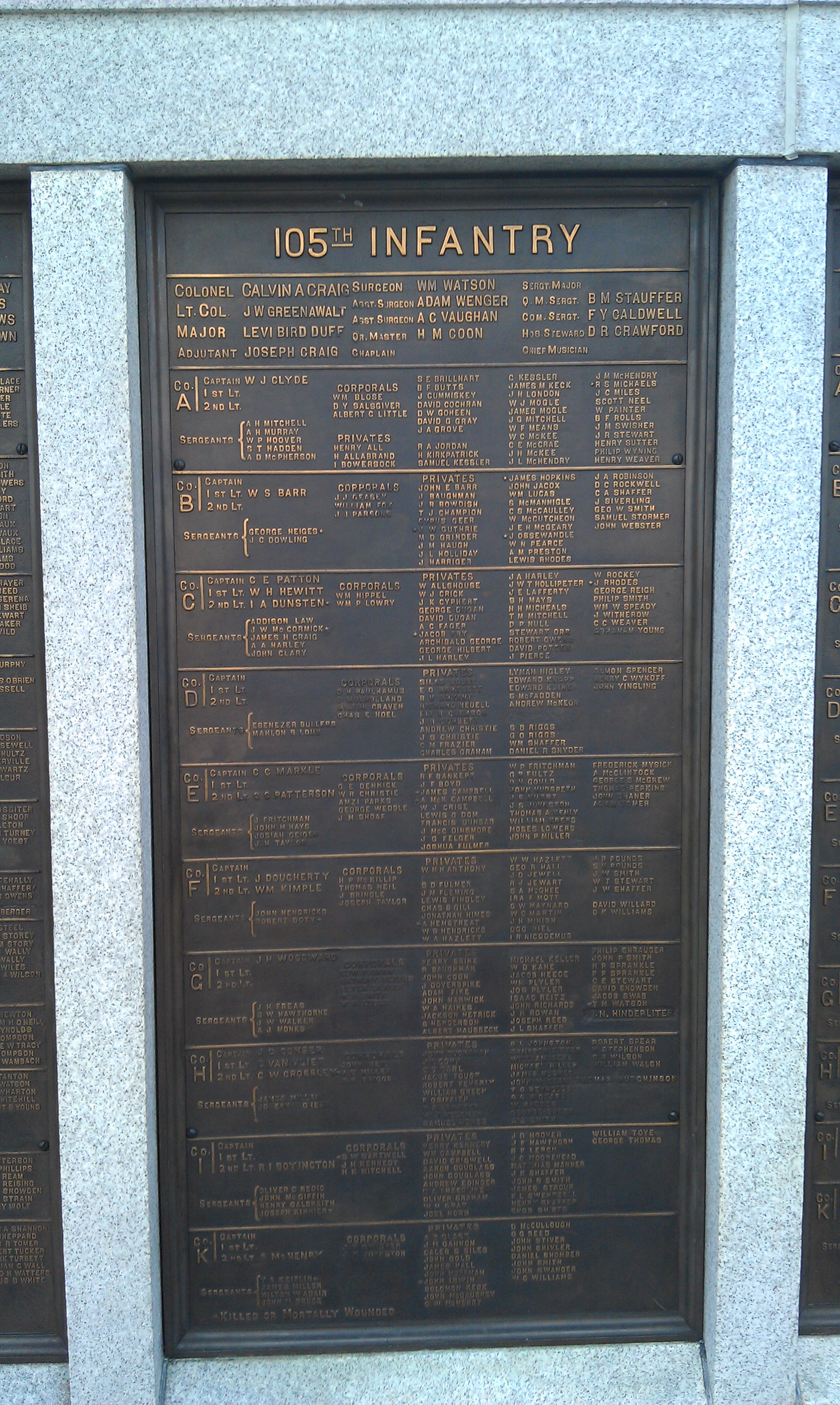
Wildcat Regiment Plaque, Pennsylvania State Memorial, Gettysburg National Battlefield
