= Guilford Dudley Bailey =

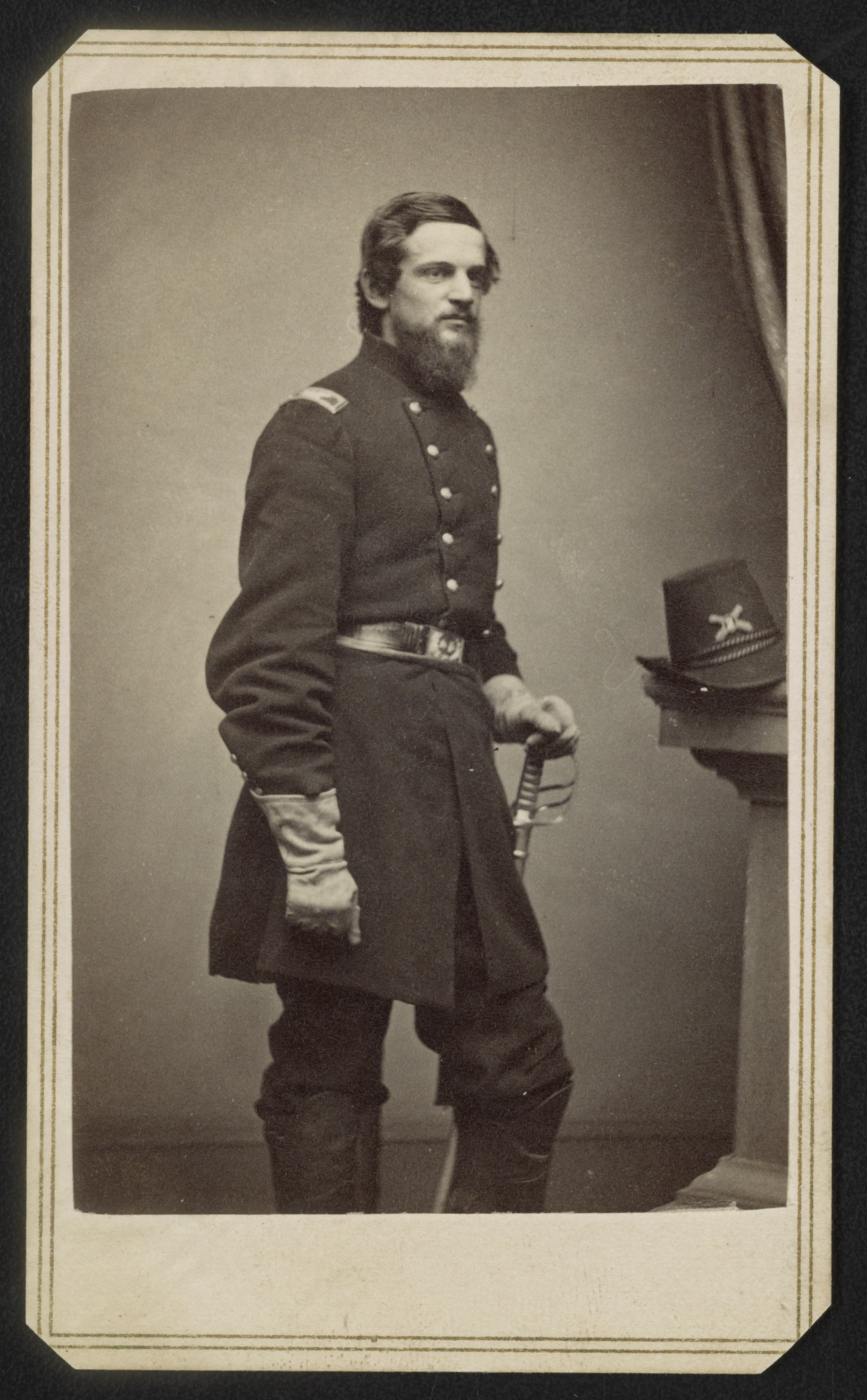
- Born: June 4 or September 24, 1834; Martinsburg, New York, US
- Died: May 31, 1862; Henrico County, Virginia
- Burial place: Poughkeepsie, New York
- Military career
- Allegiance: United States of America
- Branch: United States Army; Union Army
- Service years: 1856–1862
- Rank: Colonel
- Unit: 2nd U.S. Artillery Regiment
- Commands: 1st New York Light Artillery Regiment; Artillery, 3rd Division, IV Corps
- Conflicts: Kansas Border War; American Civil War: Siege of Yorktown; Battle of Seven Pines †

Guilford Dudley Bailey (June 4 or September 24, 1834 – May 31, 1862) was a Union Army officer during the American Civil War.

== Biography ==
Guilford Dudley Bailey was born in 1834 in Martinsburg, New York.

He graduated from the United States Military Academy at West Point in 1856, and was assigned to the 2nd U.S. Artillery Regiment. He served on frontier and garrison duty, was at Fort Leavenworth during the Kansas disturbances of 1857-59, and at West Point as instructor for a short time in 1859. When the Civil War began he was stationed at Fort Brown, Texas. There his immediate superior, Capt. George Stoneman, refused to surrender when Gen. David E. Twiggs attempted to give up his entire command to the Confederates, thus effecting Bailey's escape via Mexico. Reporting for duty as soon as he could reach Union territory, he was sent with Henry J. Hunt's battery to the relief of Fort Pickens in Florida. Returning on account of sickness, he organized and was appointed Colonel of the 1st New York Light Artillery Regiment on 25 September 1861. He joined the Army of the Potomac and became Chief of Artillery for Silas Casey's division in the IV Corps during the Peninsula campaign. Bailey was killed among his guns at the Battle of Seven Pines on May 31, 1862. A monument has been raised to his memory in the cemetery at Poughkeepsie.
