= Sturgis Rifles =

Sturges' Rifles
- Illinois flag
- Active: May 6, 1861 to November 25, 1862
- Country: United States
- Allegiance: Union
- Branch: Infantry
- Engagements: None

The Sturges' Rifles (also spelled Sturgis) was an infantry company that served in the Union Army during the American Civil War.

== Service ==
The Sturges' Rifles were a company of Illinois militia sharpshooters mustered into Federal service on May 6, 1861. The company served as part of Major General George B. McClellan's headquarters bodyguard throughout his command. McClellan had been a member of the company prior to the war and outfitted them with the Sharps rifle, an expensive rifle not issued to regular infantrymen.

The company was mustered out on November 25, 1862.

== Total strength and casualties ==
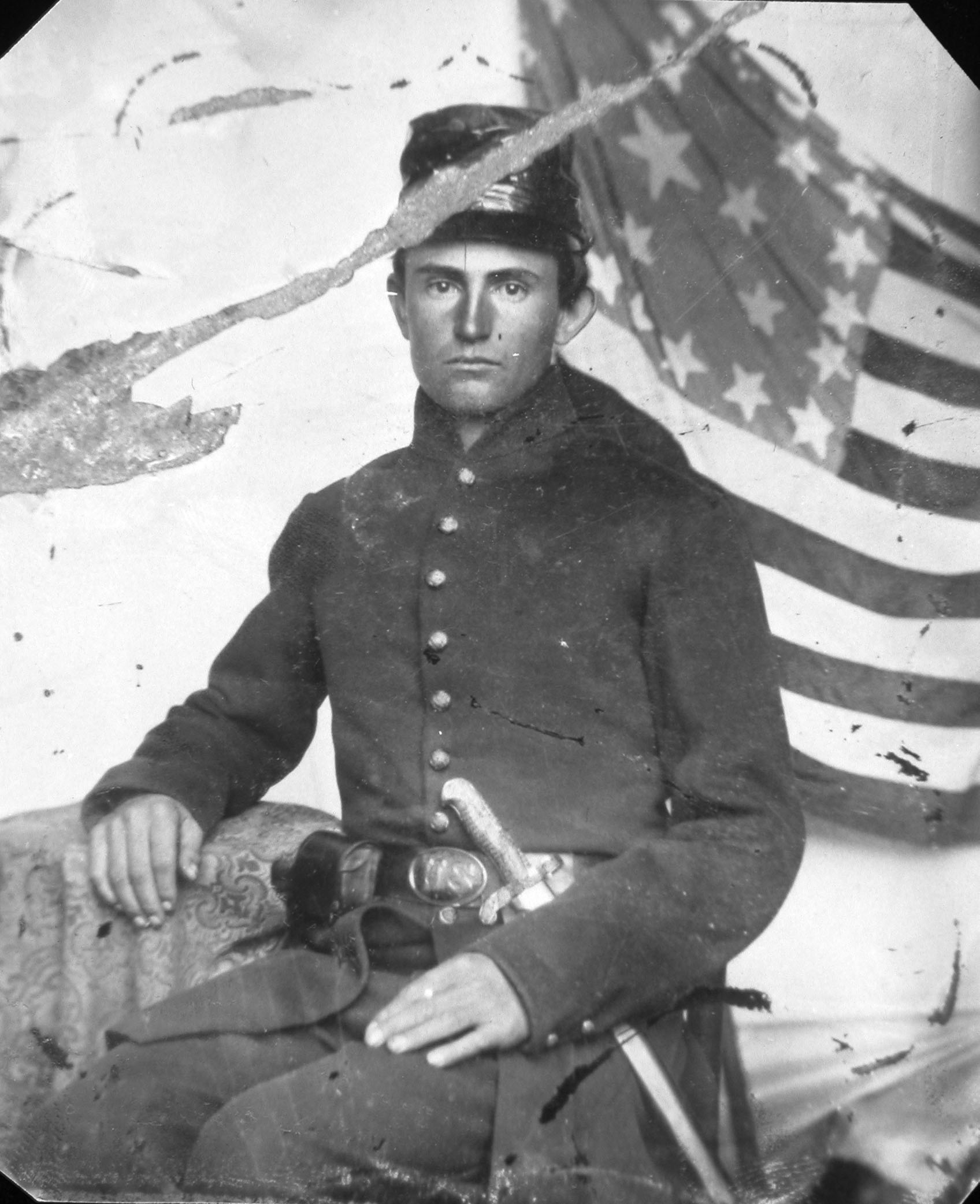
Private Samuel K. Wilson (1841-1865) of Sturges' Rifles, Illinois Volunteer Infantry (1862).

The unit had one enlisted man die of disease, for a total of one fatality.

== Commanders ==
- Captain James Steel

== See also ==
- List of Illinois Civil War Units
- Illinois in the American Civil War
