= Hamilton, Pennsylvania =

- Unincorporated community
- Location within Pennsylvania Location within the United States
- Coordinates: 40°55′26.18″N 79°4′53.94″W
- Country: United States
- State: Pennsylvania
- County: Jefferson
- Township: Perry

Population (2000)
  - Total: 132
- Time zone: UTC-5 (Eastern (EST))
  - Summer (DST): UTC-4 (EDT)
- Zip code: 15744
- Area code: 814

Hamilton is an unincorporated community in Perry Township in Jefferson County, Pennsylvania, United States.

== History ==
A post office has been in operation at Hamilton since 1852. Robert Hamilton was the first postmaster.
