= Henry Dwight Terry =

American general

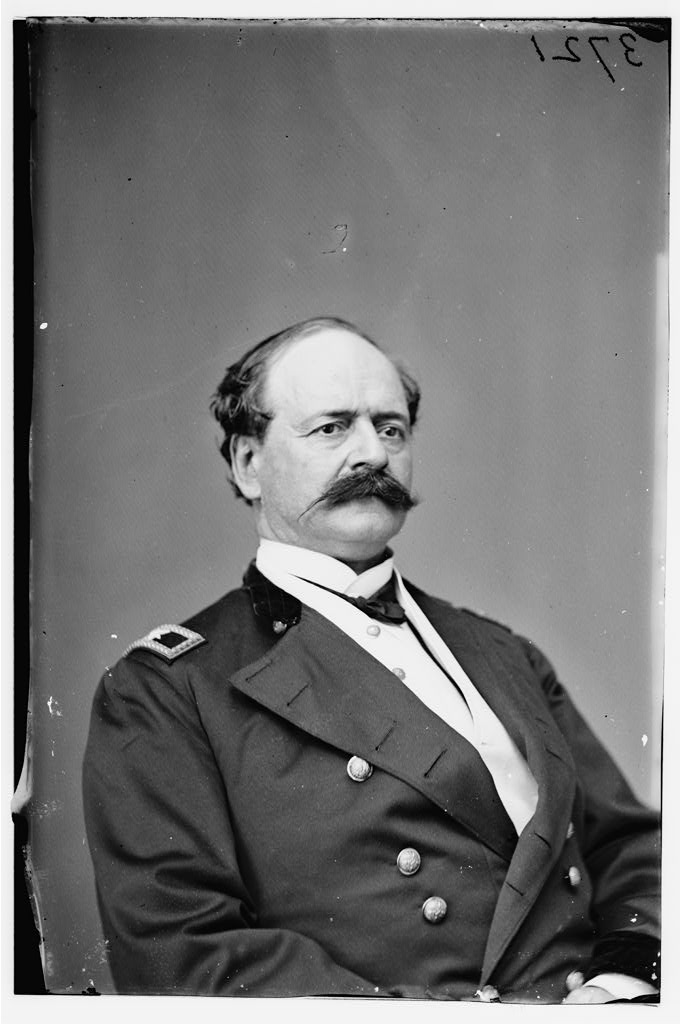
- Henry Dwight Terry
- Born: March 16, 1812; Hartford, Connecticut, US
- Died: June 22, 1869 (aged 57); Washington, D.C., US
- Burial place: Clinton Grove Cemetery, Macomb County, Michigan
- Military career
- Allegiance: United States; Union
- Branch: United States Army; Union Army
- Service years: 1861–1865
- Rank: Brigadier General
- Commands: 5th Michigan Infantry; 1st Brigade, 1st Division, VII Corps; 3rd Division, VI Corps; Johnson's Island
- Conflicts: Peninsula Campaign: Battle of Williamsburg; Battle of Seven Pines; Siege of Suffolk

Henry Dwight Terry (March 16, 1812 – June 22, 1869) was a United States Army Brigadier general who fought in the American Civil War.

== Early life and career ==
Terry was born in Hartford, Connecticut. Despite his roots in New England, he moved to the state of Michigan as a young man, where he studied law and later practiced in Detroit.

== Civil War and later life ==
Terry took an active interest in military matters. When the Civil War began, he recruited and organized the 5th Michigan Infantry, becoming its colonel on June 10, 1861. During the war's first winter, he and his regiment served in the defenses of Washington D.C.

Throughout the 1862 Peninsula Campaign, the 5th Michigan was attached to Brigadier General Samuel P. Heintzelman's III Corps, Army of the Potomac. It sustained heavy losses at both Williamsburg and Seven Pines, and in mid-July Terry was promoted to Brigadier General of Volunteers.

Early in 1863, as a part of the VII Corps, his brigade, composed of men from New York, Michigan, and Pennsylvania, was sent to Suffolk, Virginia. There, in April and May, it was besieged by Confederates under Lieutenant General James Longstreet. Once the siege was lifted, Terry reported to Major General John A. Dix, who in late June shipped his brigade up the York and Pamunkey rivers to White House, Virginia. For the next three weeks Terry participated in an operation threatening General Robert E. Lee's communications line to Richmond during the Confederate invasion of Pennsylvania.

On July 1, 1863, while attached to Major General Erasmus D. Keyes's IV Corps, Terry's command marched to Baltimore Cross Roads, within striking distance of the Confederate capital, where it encountered a scratch force of defenders. Terry, however, fed Keyes' fear that the enemy in great numbers were gathering in their rear, cutting their line of retreat. This helped persuade Keyes to retreat toward White House late on July 2. In the wake of the botched offensive, Dix and Keyes lost their field commands but Terry was returned to the Army of the Potomac, where that autumn he led a division in the VI Corps. His force supported Major General Gouverneur K. Warren's V Corps during the abortive Mine Run Campaign that November. Less than two months later, the division was sent to garrison the prison camp on Johnson's Island, Ohio.

In May 1864, when the division returned to Virginia for the spring campaign, Terry found himself superseded and left idle. At this point he disappears from official military records. He remained on inactive duty until his resignation on February 7, 1865.

After leaving the service, he resumed his law practice in Washington D.C. He died there on June 22, 1869, at the age of 57 and was buried in Clinton Grove Cemetery, near Detroit.
