= 5th Michigan Infantry Regiment =

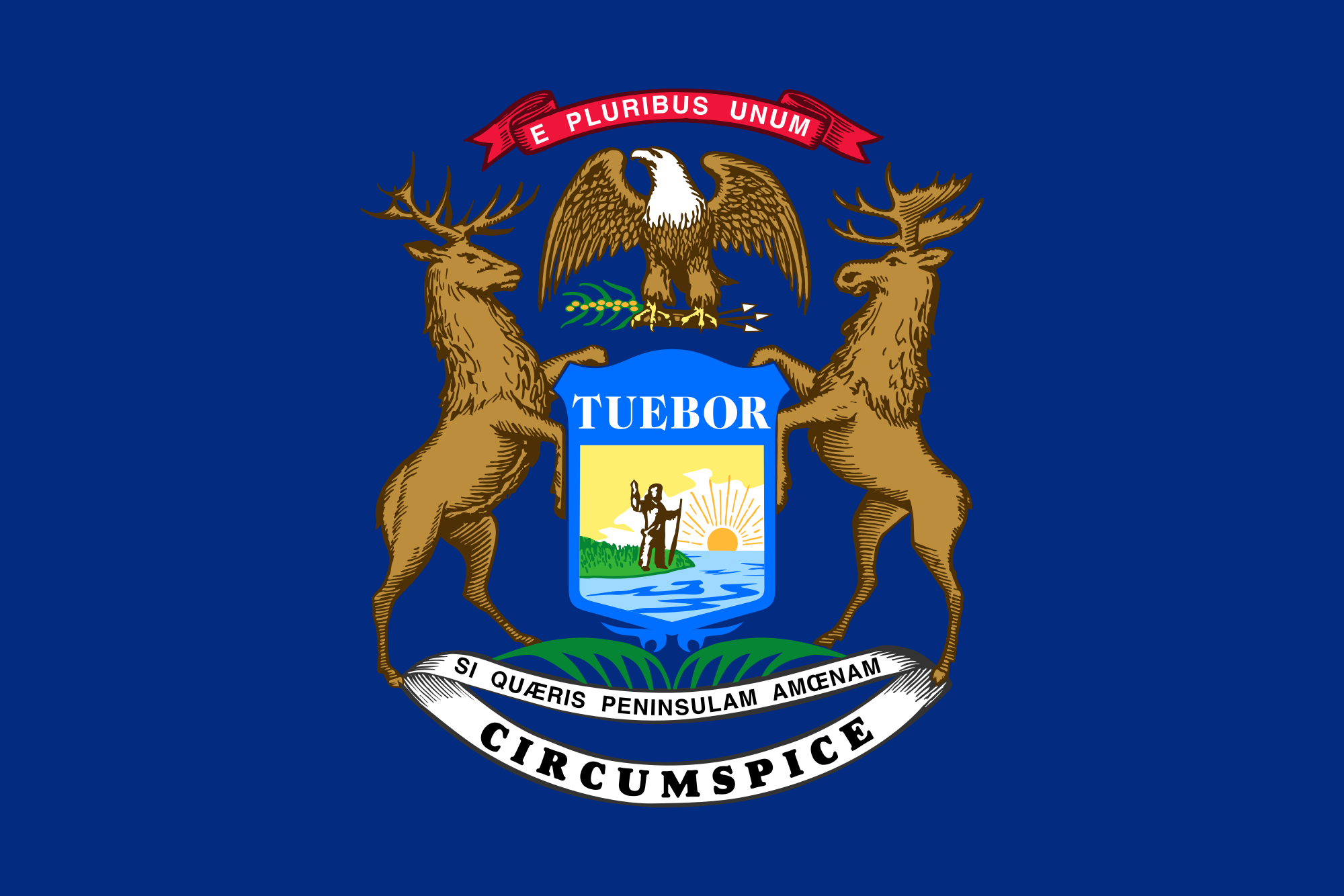
- Michigan state flag
- Active: August 28, 1861, to June 5, 1865
- Country: United States
- Allegiance: Union
- Branch: Infantry
- Engagements: Peninsular Campaign; Second Battle of Bull Run; Battle of Chantilly; Battle of Antietam; Battle of Fredericksburg; Battle of Chancellorsville; Battle of Gettysburg; Battle of the Wilderness; Battle of Spotsylvania Court House; Battle of Cold Harbor; Siege of Petersburg; Appomattox Campaign

The 5th Michigan Infantry Regiment was an infantry regiment from Michigan that served in the Union Army during the American Civil War. The regiment was mustered into federal service in August 1861 and served in the Eastern Theater. It fought in all the major battles of the Army of the Potomac, including Seven Pines, the Seven Days Battles, Second Bull Run, Chantilly, Antietam, Fredericksburg, Chancellorsville, Gettysburg, the Wilderness, Spotsylvania, Cold Harbor, Petersburg, and Appomattox. The regiment was mustered out in June 1865.

== Service ==
The 5th Michigan Infantry was organized at Detroit, Michigan and mustered into Federal service for a three-year enlistment on August 28, 1861.

In October 1862, the Army of the Potomac was reorganized. The 5th Michigan, along with the 17th Maine Volunteer Infantry Regiment, was placed in the 3rd Brigade, 1st Division, 3rd Corps. "Our regiment is assigned to the 3rd Brigade, 1st Division, III Corps (Union Army). This Brigade is commanded by General Berry of Maine (Hiram Gregory Berry), who is at this time sick at home. The division is commanded by General Birney of Pennsylvania (David B. Birney), the corps by Major General George Stoneman (George Stoneman). Colonel Poe of Michigan is in temporary command of our brigade."

The regiment was mustered out on July 5, 1865, at Jeffersonville, Indiana.

== Total Strength and Casualties ==
The regiment mustered a total of 1586 men during its existence. It suffered 454 fatalities: 16 officers and 247 enlisted men were killed in action or mortally wounded, and 3 officers and 188 enlisted men died of disease.

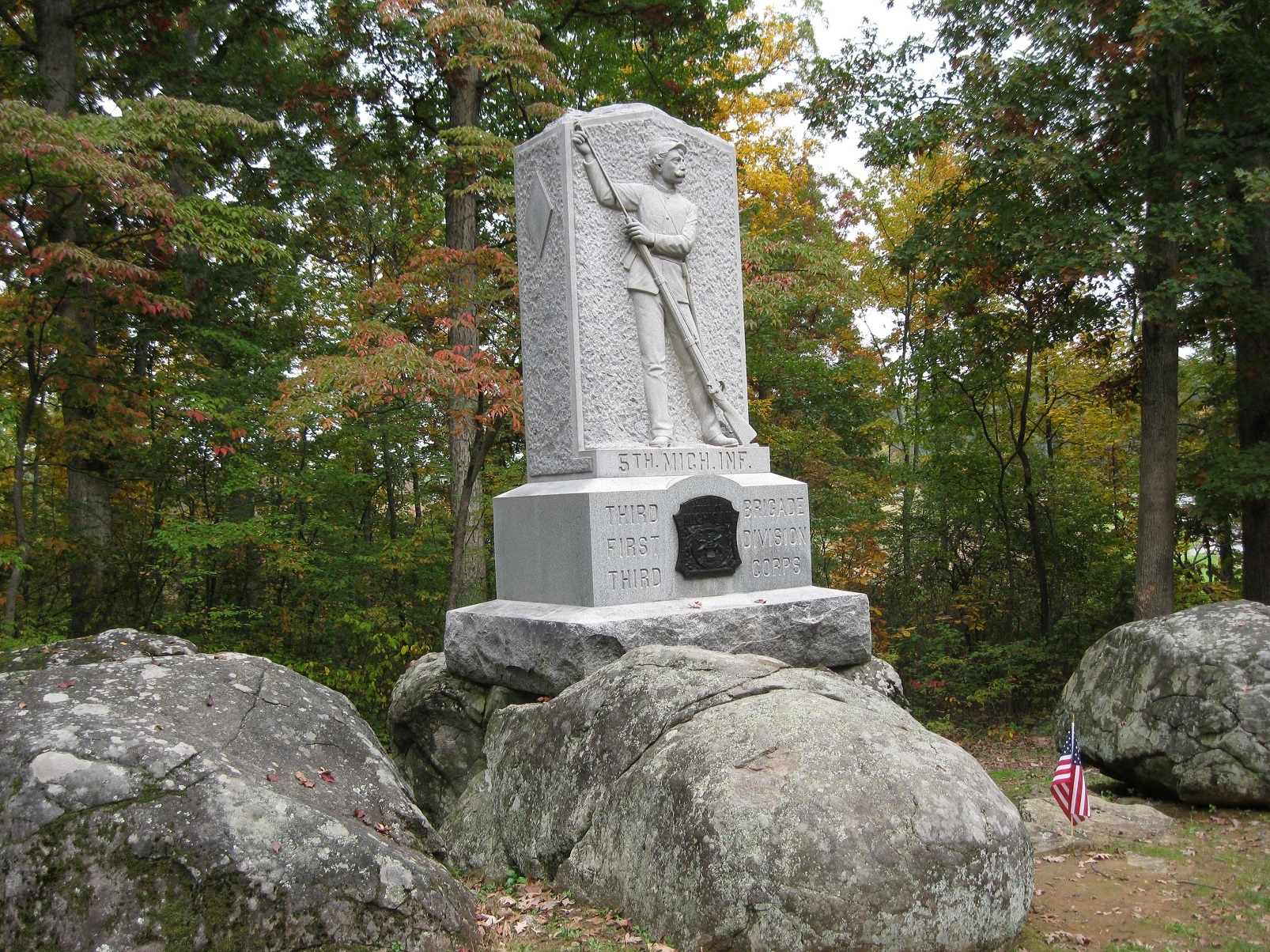
5th Michigan Infantry monument at Gettysburg National Military Park

"When compared to other Michigan regiments that fought in the Civil War, the Fifth Michigan stands out. It had the second highest number of casualties of all Michigan infantry regiments in the war. Of all Union infantry regiments in the war, the Fifth Michigan ranked fifth in total number of casualties endured. A logical explanation for so many combat deaths and wounds is the fact that the Fighting Fifth played a key role in numerous charges against Confederate positions: twice at Williamsburg (Battle of Williamsburg), and at Fair Oaks (Battle of Seven Pines) the Wilderness (Battle of the Wilderness), Spotsylvania, North Anna, and Petersburg."

== Commanders ==
- Colonel Henry D. Terry; 1861- Jun 1862
- Major John D. Fairbanks; 25 Jun 1862- 30 Jun 1862
- Captain Judson S. Farrar; Jul 1862
- Captain William Wakenshaw; Aug 1862
- Lieutenant Colonel Gilluly; - 13 Dec 1862 (KIA)
- Lieutenant Colonel Sherlock; 13 Dec 1862 - 3 May 1863 (KIA)
- Lieutenant Colonel John Pulford; 3 May 1863 – 5 May 1864
- Major Salmon S. Mathews; 5 May 1864
- Captain William Wakenshaw; 6 May 1864
- Captain Edgar H. Shook; 6 May 1864,
- Lieutenant (unnamed); May 1864
- Colonel John Pulford; Jun 1864
- Major Daniel S. Root; Aug 1864
- Lieutenant Colonel Salmon S. Mathews; Oct 1864
- Lieutenant Colonel Daniel S. Root; 31 Jan 1865
- Colonel John Pulford; 28 Feb 1865 – 17 Jul 1865

== Timeline ==
- August 28, 1861 Organized at Detroit, Mich., and mustered in.
- September 11 Left State for Washington, D.C.
- September 13 Attached to Richardson's Brigade, Heintzelman's Division, Army of the Potomac and duty in the Defenses of Washington, D.C.
- October 21–24 Reconnaissance to Occoquan.
- January 9, 1862 Pohick Run, Va.
- March, 1862 Attached to Berry's 3rd Brigade, Kearny's 3rd Division, 3rd Army Corps, Army of the Potomac. (See III Corps (Union Army).
- March 10–15 Advance to Manassas, Va.
- March 17 Moved to the Virginia Peninsula .
- March to August. Peninsula Campaign.
- April 5-May 4 Siege of Yorktown, Va. (see Siege of Yorktown (1862).
- May 31-June 1 Battle of Fair Oaks, or Battle of Seven Pines.
- June 25-July 1 Seven Days Battles.
- June 25 Battle of Oak Grove.
- June 29 Battle of Savage's Station and at Peach Orchard.
- June 30 Charles City Cross Roads and Glendale.
- July 1 Battle of Malvern Hill.
- July 2 - August 16 Duty at Harrison's Landing.
- August 16–26 Movement to Fortress Monroe, then to Centreville; 3rd Brigade, 1st Division, 3rd Army Corps.
- August 29 Battle of Groveton during the Second Battle of Bull Run.
- August 30 Bull Run.
- September 1 Battle of Chantilly.
- September 2 - October 11 Duty in the Defenses of Washington, D, C.
- October 11-November 23 March up the Potomac to Leesburg, and then to Falmouth.
- December 12–15 Battle of Fredericksburg.
- January 20–24, 1863 "Mud March" (See Mud March (American Civil War).
- January 25 - April 27 At Falmouth.
- April 27-May 6 Chancellorsville Campaign.
- May 1–5 Battle of Chancellorsville.
- June 11-July 24 Gettysburg Campaign.
- July 1–3 Battle of Gettysburg.

The Regiment was commanded at Gettysburg by Lieutenant Colonel John Pulford, who was wounded on July 2 - the third of five times during the war.

From the Gettysburg monument: "Effective strength July 2nd 1863; present and detached service 21 officers and 262 men, total 283. Casualties: Killed 2 officers, 17 men; Wounded 8 officers 78 men; Missing 4 men; Total 109."

"The regiment fought here about 4:30 o'clock p.m., July 2, 1863, after it had been assembled from the skirmish line far in advance of this position. It moved to the support of the 2nd Corps in resisting Pickett's Charge, July 3."

- July 5–24 Pursuit of Lee to Manassas Gap, Va. Battle of Manassas Gap.
- July 23 Action at Wapping Heights, Va.
- August 16-September 17 On detached duty at New York City and at Troy, N.Y. New York City draft riots.
- October 9–22 Bristoe Campaign.
- October 13 Auburn.
- November 7–8 Advance to line of the Rappahannock during the Second Battle of Rappahannock Station.
- November 7 Kelly's Ford
- November 26-December 2 Battle of Mine Run
- November 27 Payne's Farm
- January 4 to
- February 14, 1864 Veterans on furlough
- February 6–7 Demonstration on the Rapidan during the Battle of Morton's Ford.
- March Attached to 2nd Brigade. 3rd Division, 2nd Army Corps. (See II Corps (Union Army).
- May 4-June 15 Campaign from the Rapidan to the James River.
- May 5–7 Battle of the Wilderness.
- May 8 Laurel Hill
- May 8–12 Battle of Spotsylvania Court House
- May 10 Po River.
- May 12–21 Spotsylvania Court House.
- May 12 Assault on the Salient ("Bloody Angle").
- May 19 Harris Farm, Fredericksburg Road
- May 23–26 Battle of North Anna
- May 26–28 On line of the Pamunkey
- May 8–31 Totopotomoy
- June 1–12 Battle of Cold Harbor.
- June 16–18 Before Petersburg.
- June 16 Siege of Petersburg.
- June 22–23 Jerusalem Plank Road, Weldon Railroad.
- July 27–29 Demonstration on north side of the James.
- July 27–28 First Battle of Deep Bottom.
- August 13–20 Demonstration on north side of the James at Deep Bottom.
- August 14–18 Strawberry Plains.
- September 29-October 2 Poplar Springs Church
- October 27–28 Boydton Plank Road, Hatcher's Run
- December 7–12 Warren's Raid on Weldon Railroad
- February 5–7, 1865 Dabney's Mills, Hatcher's Run
- March 25 Watkins' House
- March 28-April 9 Appomattox Campaign.
- March 30–31 White Oak Road
- March 31 Crow's House
- April 2 Fall of Petersburg
- April 3–9 Pursuit of Lee
- April 6 Sailor's Creek
- April 7 High Bridge
- April 9 Battle of Appomattox Court House, surrender of Lee and his army.
- May 2–12 March to Washington, D.C.
- May 23 Grand Review of the Armies
- June 10–14 Moved to Louisville, Ky.
- June 15 - July 5 At Jeffersonville, Ind.
- July 5, 1865 Mustered out
- 17 July 1865 Disbanded at Detroit, Mi.

== See also ==
- List of Michigan Civil War Units
- Michigan in the American Civil War
