= Michigan sharpshooter units in the American Civil War =

Michigan Sharpshooters
- Michigan Flag.
- Active: 1861 - 1865
- Country: United States
- Allegiance: Union
- Branch: Army
- Type: Infantry
- Size: Battalion or Company
- Engagements: American Civil War

The State of Michigan raised a number of Battalion and Company-sized specialist sharpshooter units in addition to the 1st Regiment Michigan Volunteer Sharpshooters.

== Brady's Independent Company ==
Brady's Company was organized at Detroit, Michigan on February 3, 1862. The company was attached to the 16th Michigan Volunteer Infantry Regiment.

== Dygert's Independent Company ==
Brady's Company was organized in February 1862. The company was attached to the 16th Michigan Volunteer Infantry Regiment.

== Hall's Independent Battalion ==
Hall's Battalion was organized at Marshall, Michigan between August 27 and November 2, 1864. The battalion was initially a part of the defenses of City Point, Virginia, until they were ordered to the line then were absorbed into the 1st Michigan Sharpshooters Regiment.

== Jardine's Independent Company ==
Jardine's Company was organized at Saginaw, Michigan on May 3, 1864. The company was attached to the 27th Michigan Volunteer Infantry Regiment.

== United States Sharpshooters ==
Companies "C", "I", and "K" of the 1st United States Volunteer Sharpshooter Regiment as well as Company "B" of the 2nd United States Volunteer Sharpshooter Regiment were raised in Michigan.

== Western Sharpshooters Regiment ==
Company "D" of the Western Sharpshooters Regiment was raised in Michigan. The Western Sharpshooters were the Western Theater counterpart to "Berdan's" 1st and 2nd U.S.V.S.S. which operated in the Army of the Potomac. The regiment, which was repeatedly renamed, was in continual service from Nov 23, 1861 to July 7, 1865. Major John Piper, of the 1st Regiment Michigan Volunteer Sharpshooters, was originally a member of Company "D" (WSS), but resigned in 1863 to take a position in the new Michigan sharpshooter regiment. A veteran of Company D ("The Michigan Boys"), Sergeant Lorenzo A. Barker, wrote the only history of the regiment, "With the Western Sharpshooters", published in 1905. Barker's manuscript diary is located in the Historical Manuscript collection of the Michigan Historical Museum where his engraved Henry Repeating Rifle is also preserved.

== See also ==
- List of Michigan Civil War Units
- Michigan in the American Civil War
