= 18th North Carolina Infantry Regiment =

Infantry regiment of the Confederate States Army

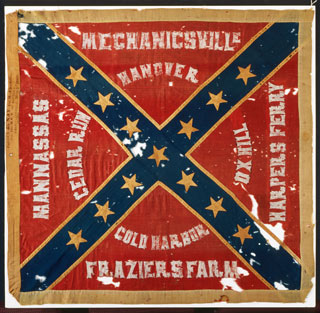
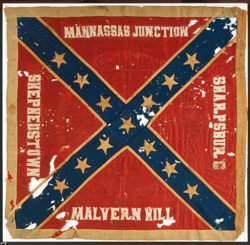
- 18th North Carolina Infantry flag obverse and reverse
- Active: July 1861 – April 1865
- Country: Confederate States of America
- Allegiance: North Carolina
- Branch: Confederate States Army
- Role: Infantry
- Engagements: American Civil War: Battle of Hanover Court House; Seven Days' Battles; Battle of Cedar Mountain; Northern Virginia Campaign; Battle of Antietam; Battle of Fredericksburg; Battle of Chancellorsville; Battle of Gettysburg; Bristoe Campaign; Battle of the Wilderness; Battle of Spotsylvania Court House; Battle of North Anna; Battle of Cold Harbor; Siege of Petersburg; Appomattox Campaign

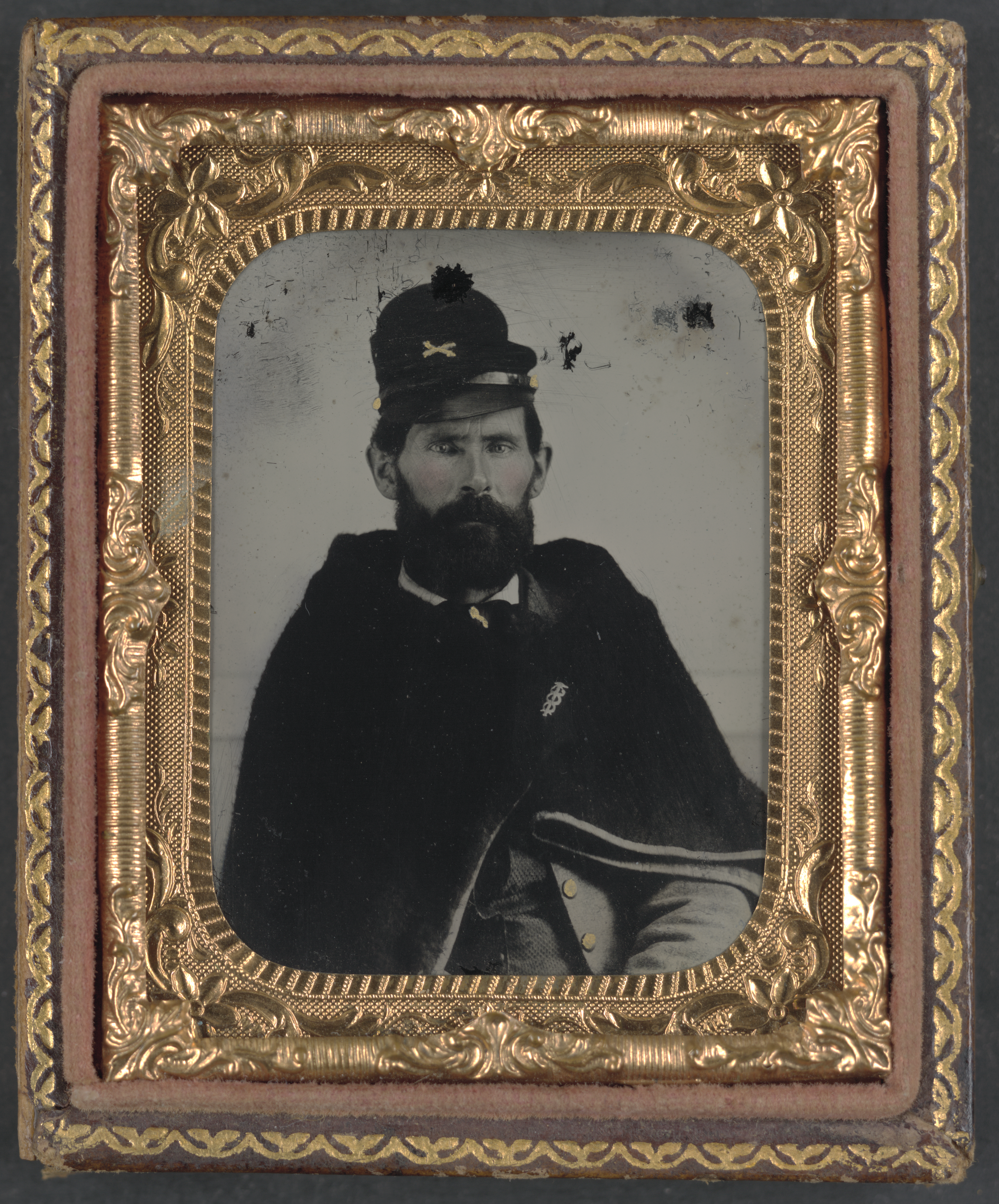
Private Archibald D. Council of Co. K, 18th North Carolina Infantry Regiment, in uniform and wrapped with hospital blanket

The 18th North Carolina Infantry Regiment was an infantry regiment raised in North Carolina for service in the Confederate States Army during the American Civil War. It fought mostly with the Army of Northern Virginia.

The 18th Infantry Regiment, formerly the 8th Volunteers, was organized at Camp Wyatt, near Carolina Beach, North Carolina, in July, 1861. Its members were from Wilmington and the counties of Robeson, New Hanover, Bladen, Columbus, and Richmond. It was commanded by Colonel James D. Radcliffe, Lieutenant Colonel Oliver P. Meares, and Major George Tate. It moved to South Carolina, returned to North Carolina, then in the spring of 1862 proceeded to Virginia. The 18th served in General Branch's and Lane's Brigade, Army of Northern Virginia. After fighting at Hanover Court House, it participated in various conflicts of the army from the Seven Days' Battles to Cold Harbor. It continued the fight in the trenches of Petersburg south of the James River and ended the war at Appomattox. This unit was organized with 1,100 men, lost fifty-seven percent of the 396 engaged during the Seven Days' Battles, and reported 14 casualties at Cedar Mountain and 12 at Second Manassas. There were 13 killed and 77 wounded at Fredericksburg and 30 killed and 96 wounded at Chancellorsville. Of the 346 in action at Gettysburg, about twenty-five percent were disabled. It surrendered 11 officers and 73 men at Appomattox Court House on April 9, 1865, including Major Thomas J. Wooten and captains Benjamin F. Rinaldi and John J. Poisson.

The field officers were Colonels John D. Barry, Robert H. Cowan, Thomas J. Purdie, and James D. Radcliffe; Lieutenant Colonels Forney George, John W. McGill, and Oliver P. Meares; and Majors George Tait and Thomas J. Wooten.

The 18th North Carolina was also responsible for the accidental shooting of Stonewall Jackson during the battle of Chancellorsville. The next day, May 3, 1863, their battle flag would be captured. Just over a year later, on May 12, 1864, they lost another battle flag to Alexander H. Mitchell of the 105th Pennsylvania Infantry. Mitchell would later be awarded the Medal of Honor for his actions.

== See also ==
- List of North Carolina Confederate Civil War units
