= List of Medal of Honor recipients for the Battle of the Wilderness =

The Battle of the Wilderness, was fought around Locust Grove, Virginia, on May 5 through May 7, 1864, during the Overland Campaign in the American Civil War. Nearly 30,000 soldiers, when combining counts for both sides, were killed, wounded, or captured. The battle marked Lieutenant General Ulysses S. Grant's first appearance in a battle in the war's Eastern Theater.

Twenty Union Army enlisted men and three officers were awarded the Medal of Honor for acts of valor during the battle, which ended inconclusively when the Union army moved further south. All of the recipients were from the infantry, although cavalry were present. With one exception, all of the awards were for actions on the first two days of the battle. In two cases, extra action places were listed in addition to the Battle of the Wilderness.

== Background ==
The Battle of the Wilderness was the first battle in Union Army Lieutenant General Ulysses S. Grant's Overland Campaign. The objective in this campaign was to eliminate Confederate Army General Robert E. Lee's Army of Northern Virginia. It was fought in a dense woods known as "The Wilderness", located in Virginia's Orange and Spotsylvania counties—including the small community of Locust Grove. Over 160,000 soldiers were engaged in the battle, and most of the fighting occurred on May 5 and May 6. Combined casualties were nearly 30,000. Although Grant withdrew from the battlefield (normally, defeated armies withdraw), he moved south where his infantry engaged Lee again at the Battle of Spotsylvania and his cavalry fought Confederate cavalry in the Battle of Todd's Tavern.

The Medal of Honor was created during the American Civil War and is the highest military decoration presented by the United States government to a member of its armed forces. The recipient must have distinguished themselves at the risk of their own life above and beyond the call of duty in action against an enemy of the United States. A search for "Wilderness" under the National Park Service's Medal of Honor database returns 23 recipients, including two captains and a colonel. Two soldiers have multiple places listed. In the case of Sergeant Abraham Cohn, actions at the Battle of the Wilderness and at the Siege of Petersburg are mentioned in his citation. The citation for James Madison Cutts is for triple service. It says "Gallantry in actions", and his Medal of Honor Action Place is Wilderness, Spotsylvania and Petersburg, Virginia.

== Recipients ==
Image	Name	Rank	Unit	Date of action	Date of award	Notes and Citations
	Henry H. Bingham	Captain	140th Pennsylvania Infantry Regiment	May 6, 1864	August 31, 1893	Rallied and led into action a portion of the troops who had given way under the fierce assaults of the enemy.
	Henri Le Fevre Brown	Sergeant	72nd New York Infantry Regiment	May 6, 1864	June 23, 1896	Voluntarily and under a heavy fire from the enemy, Brown three times crossed the field of battle with a load of ammunition in a blanket on his back, thus supplying the Federal forces, whose ammunition had nearly all been expended, and enabling them to hold their position until reinforcement arrived, when the enemy were driven from their position.
	Abram J. Buckles	Sergeant	19th Indiana Infantry Regiment	May 5, 1864	December 4, 1893	Wounded while leading a charge. Though suffering from an open wound, Buckles carried the regimental colors until again wounded.
—	Thomas Burk	Sergeant	97th New York Infantry Regiment	May 6, 1864	August 24, 1896	At the risk of his own life, Burk went back while the rebels were still firing and, finding Col. Wheelock unable to move, alone and unaided, carried him off the field of battle.
—	Abraham Cohn	Sergeant Major	6th New Hampshire Infantry Regiment	July 30, 1864	August 24, 1865	During Battle of the Wilderness rallied and formed, under heavy fire, disorganized and fleeing troops of different regiments. At Petersburg, Virginia, 30 July 1864, bravely and coolly carried orders to the advanced line under severe fire. Action date for Battle of the Wilderness is listed in the Official Record as May 6, 1864.
	James M. Cutts (Note: James Madison Cutts Jr., who eventually became a lieutenant colonel, is the grand-nephew of President James Madison, and brother-in-law of Senator Stephen A. Douglas.)	Captain	11th Infantry Regiment (United States)	1864	May 2, 1891	Gallantry in actions. (Wilderness campaign, Spotsylvania and Petersburg)
	Patrick De Lacey	First Sergeant	143rd Pennsylvania Infantry Regiment	May 6, 1864	April 24, 1894	Running ahead of the line, under a concentrated fire, he shot the color bearer of a Confederate regiment on the works, thus contributing to the success of the attack.
	Edmund English	Sergeant	2nd New Jersey Infantry Regiment	May 6, 1864	February 13, 1891	Stopped his men from retreating. During a rout and while under orders to retreat, seized the colors, rallied the men, and drove the enemy back.
—	James R. Evans	Private	62nd New York Infantry Regiment	May 5, 1864	February 25, 1895	Went out in front of the line under a fierce fire and, in the face of the rapidly advancing enemy, rescued the regimental flag with which the color bearer had fallen.
	Peter Grace	Sergeant	83rd Pennsylvania Infantry Regiment	May 5, 1864	December 27, 1894	Singlehandedly rescued a comrade from two Confederate guards, knocking down one and compelling the surrender of the other.
—	Henry Hill	Corporal	50th Pennsylvania Infantry Regiment	May 6, 1864	September 23, 1897	This soldier, with one companion, would not retire when his regiment fell back in confusion after an unsuccessful charge, but instead advanced and continued firing upon the enemy until the regiment re-formed and regained its position.
	Leopold Karpeles	Sergeant	57th Massachusetts Infantry Regiment	May 6, 1864	April 30, 1870	Stopped his men from retreating. While color bearer, rallied the retreating troops and induced them to check the enemy's advance. Official Record says "Gallantry in action...."
—	Joseph B. Kemp	First Sergeant	5th Michigan Infantry Regiment	May 6, 1864	December 1, 1864	Fought three Confederate soldiers while alone to capture their battle flag. Capture of flag of 31st North Carolina (C.S.A.) in a personal encounter. Listed for Medal of Honor in Official Record.
	Cyrus B. Lower	Private	13th Pennsylvania Reserve Regiment	May 7, 1864	July 20, 1887	Gallant services and soldierly qualities in voluntarily rejoining his command after having been wounded. Listed in Official Record for Medal of Honor and wound described as received at the Wilderness, Virginia.
	Charles E. Morse	Sergeant	62nd New York Infantry Regiment	May 5, 1864	January 14, 1890	Commanded company in absence of commissioned officer and shot in knee. Voluntarily rushed back into the enemy's lines, took the colors from the color sergeant, who was mortally wounded, and, although himself wounded, carried them through the fight. Official Record cites "Bravery in action".
—	John N. Opel	Private	7th Indiana Infantry Regiment	May 5, 1864	December 1, 1864	Capture of flag of 50th Virginia Infantry (C.S.A.). Official Record confirms capture of flag.
—	John H. Patterson	First Lieutenant	11th Infantry Regiment (United States)	May 5, 1864	July 23, 1897	Under the heavy fire of the advancing enemy, picked up and carried several hundred yards to a place of safety a wounded officer of his regiment who was helpless and would otherwise have been burned in the forest. The rescue was made near Saunders Field where fire, ignited by muzzle blasts, swept through the brush of the dry woods.
—	Carlos H. Rich	First Sergeant	4th Vermont Infantry Regiment	May 5, 1864	January 4, 1895	Saved the life of an officer.
—	Stephen Rought	Sergeant	141st Pennsylvania Infantry Regiment	May 6, 1864	December 1, 1864	Capture of flag of the 13th North Carolina Infantry (C.S.A.). Official Record confirms capture of flag.
	Jacob E. Swap	Private	83rd Pennsylvania Infantry	May 5, 1864	November 19, 1897	Joined in charge after being ordered to hospital. Wounded five times at Spotsylvania. Although assigned to other duty, he voluntarily joined his regiment in a charge and fought with it until severely wounded.
—	William P. Thompson	Sergeant	20th Indiana Infantry Regiment	May 6, 1864	December 1, 1864	Capture of flag of 55th Virginia Infantry (C.S.A.). Official Record confirms capture of flag.
	Benjamin F. Tracy	Colonel	109th New York Infantry Regiment	May 6, 1864	June 21, 1895	Seized the colors and led the regiment when other regiments had retired and then reformed his line and held it.
—	James M. Young	Private	72nd New York Infantry Regiment	May 6, 1864	April 2, 1898	With two companions, voluntarily went forward in the forest to reconnoiter the enemy's position; was fired upon and one of his companions disabled. Pvt. Young took the wounded man upon his back and, under fire, carried him to within the Union lines.

== Notes ==
Footnotes

Citations

References

- Beyer, Walter F.; Keydel, Oscar F. (1907). Deeds of Valor : from Records in the Archives of the United States Government; How American Heroes Won the Medal of Honor; History of our Recent Wars and Explorations, from Personal Reminiscences and Records of Officers and Enlisted Men who were Rewarded by Congress for Most Conspicuous Acts of Bravery on the Battle-field, on the High Seas and in Arctic Explorations Volume I. Detroit: Perrien-Keydel Co. OCLC 3898179.
- Scott, Robert, ed. (1891). The War of the Rebellion: a Compilation of the Official Records of the Union and Confederate Armies Series I Volume XXXVI Part I. Washington, D.C.: Government Printing Office. OCLC 3888071.
- Wallace, Lew (1897). The Story of American heroism : Thrilling Narratives of Personal Adventures During the Great Civil War, as Told by the Medal Winners and Roll of Honor Men. Springfield, Ohio: J. W. Jones. OCLC 11816985.
