= Battle of Boydton Plank Road order of battle: Union =

The following Union Army units and commanders fought in the Battle of Boydton Plank Road (October 27–28, 1864) of the American Civil War. Order of battle compiled from the casualty returns.

== Abbreviations used ==
=== Military rank ===
- MG = Major General
- BG = Brigadier General
- Col = Colonel
- Ltc = Lieutenant Colonel
- Maj = Major
- Cpt = Captain
- Lt = Lieutenant
- Bvt = Brevet

=== Other ===
- w = wounded
- mw = mortally wounded
- k = killed in action
- c = captured

== Army of the Potomac ==
=== II Corps ===
MG Winfield S. Hancock

Division	Brigade	Regiments and Others
Second Division; BG Thomas W. Egan	1st Brigade Ltc Horace P. Rugg	19th Maine; 19th Massachusetts; 20th Massachusetts; 1st Company Massachusetts Sharpshooters; 7th Michigan; 1st Minnesota Battalion (2 companies); 59th New York; 152nd New York; 184th Pennsylvania; 36th Wisconsin
Second Division; BG Thomas W. Egan	2nd Brigade Col James M. Willett	8th New York Heavy Artillery; 155th New York; 164th New York; 170th New York; 182nd New York
Second Division; BG Thomas W. Egan	3rd Brigade BG Thomas A. Smyth	14th Connecticut; 1st Delaware; 12th New Jersey; 10th New York (6 companies); 108th New York; 4th Ohio (4 companies); 69th Pennsylvania; 106th Pennsylvania (3 companies); 7th West Virginia (5 companies)
Second Division; BG Thomas W. Egan	Artillery	5th United States, Battery C and Battery I
Second Division; BG Thomas W. Egan	Provost Guard Cpt Mahlon Black	2nd Company Minnesota Sharpshooters
Third Division; Bvt MG Gershom Mott	1st Brigade BG P. Regis De Trobriand	20th Indiana; 1st Maine Heavy Artillery; 17th Maine; 40th New York; 73rd New York; 86th New York; 124th New York; 99th Pennsylvania; 110th Pennsylvania; 2nd United States Sharpshooters
Third Division; Bvt MG Gershom Mott	2nd Brigade BG Byron R. Pierce	1st Massachusetts Heavy Artillery; 5th Michigan; 93rd New York; 57th Pennsylvania; 84th Pennsylvania; 105th Pennsylvania; 141st Pennsylvania; 1st United States Sharpshooters (3 companies)
Third Division; Bvt MG Gershom Mott	3rd Brigade Col Robert McAllister	11th Massachusetts (7 companies); 5th New Jersey (5 companies); 7th New Jersey (4 companies); 8th New Jersey; 11th New Jersey; 72nd New York (1 company); 120th New York
Third Division; Bvt MG Gershom Mott	Artillery	Massachusetts Light, 10th Battery: Lt Henry H. Granger (mw); 4th United States, Battery K

=== V Corps ===
MG Gouverneur K. Warren

Escort: Cpt Napoleon J. Horrell

- 4th Pennsylvania Cavalry (detachment)

Provost Guard: Cpt Paul A. Oliver

- 5th New York Battalion

Ambulance Train: Cpt William F. Drum

Division	Brigade	Regiments and Others
First Division; BG Charles Griffin	1st Brigade Col Horatio G. Sickel	185th New York; 198th Pennsylvania
First Division; BG Charles Griffin	2nd Brigade Col Edgar M. Gregory	187th New York (6 companies); 188th New York; 91st Pennsylvania; 155th Pennsylvania
First Division; BG Charles Griffin	3rd Brigade BG Joseph J. Bartlett	20th Maine; 32nd Massachusetts; 1st Michigan; 16th Michigan; 83rd Pennsylvania (6 companies); 118th Pennsylvania
Second Division; BG Romeyn B. Ayres	1st Brigade Col Frederick Winthrop	5th New York; 15th New York Heavy Artillery; 140th New York; 146th New York: Maj James G. Grindlay; 8th United States; 11th United States; 12th United States; 14th United States
Second Division; BG Romeyn B. Ayres	2nd Brigade Col Andrew W. Denison	1st Maryland; 4th Maryland; 7th Maryland; 8th Maryland
Second Division; BG Romeyn B. Ayres	3rd Brigade Col Arthur H. Grimshaw	3rd Delaware; 4th Delaware; 157th Pennsylvania (4 companies); 190th Pennsylvania; 191st Pennsylvania; 210th Pennsylvania
Second Division; BG Romeyn B. Ayres	Provost Guard Cpt Joshua S. Fletcher, Jr.	2nd United States, Company C
Third Division; BG Samuel W. Crawford	1st Brigade BG Edward S. Bragg	24th Michigan: Ltc Albert M. Edwards; 1st Battalion New York Sharpshooters; 143rd Pennsylvania; 149th Pennsylvania; 150th Pennsylvania; 6th Wisconsin; 7th Wisconsin; Independent (Wisconsin) Battalion
Third Division; BG Samuel W. Crawford	3rd Brigade Col William Hofmann	76th New York (6 companies); 95th New York; 147th New York: Ltc George Harney (c), Maj John McKinlock; 56th Pennsylvania; 121st Pennsylvania; 142nd Pennsylvania
	Artillery Brigade Col Charles S. Wainwright	Massachusetts Light, 5th Battery (E); Massachusetts Light, 9th Battery; 1st New York Light, Battery B; 1st New York Light, Battery H; 4th United States, Battery B

=== IX Corps ===
MG John G. Parke

Escort: Lt William W. Neiterfield

- 2nd Pennsylvania Cavalry, Companies C and H

Provost Guard: Cpt Andrew D. Baird

- 79th New York

Division	Brigade	Regiments and Others
First Division; BG Orlando B. Willcox	1st Brigade BG John F. Hartranft	8th Michigan; 27th Michigan; 109th New York; 13th Ohio Cavalry (dismounted); 51st Pennsylvania; 37th Wisconsin; 38th Wisconsin
First Division; BG Orlando B. Willcox	2nd Brigade Col Byron M. Cutcheon	1st Michigan Sharpshooters; 2nd Michigan; 20th Michigan; 46th New York; 60th Ohio; 50th Pennsylvania
First Division; BG Orlando B. Willcox	3rd Brigade Col Napoleon B. McLaughlen	3rd Maryland (4 companies); 29th Massachusetts; 57th Massachusetts; 59th Massachusetts; 14th New York Heavy Artillery; 100th Pennsylvania
First Division; BG Orlando B. Willcox	Acting Engineers Col Constant Luce	17th Michigan
Second Division; BG Robert B. Potter	1st Brigade Col John I. Curtin	21st Massachusetts (3 companies); 35th Massachusetts; 36th Massachusetts; 58th Massachusetts; 39th New Jersey; 51st New York; 45th Pennsylvania; 48th Pennsylvania; 4th Rhode Island; 7th Rhode Island
Second Division; BG Robert B. Potter	2nd Brigade BG Simon G. Griffin	31st Maine; 32nd Maine; 56th Massachusetts; 6th New Hampshire; 9th New Hampshire; 11th New Hampshire; 2nd New York Mounted Rifles (dismounted); 179th New York; 186th New York; 17th Vermont
Third Division; BG Edward Ferrero	1st Brigade Ltc Ozora P. Stearns	27th United States Colored Troops; 30th United States Colored Troops; 39th United States Colored Troops; 43rd United States Colored Troops
Third Division; BG Edward Ferrero	3rd Brigade Col Henry G. Thomas	19th United States Colored Troops; 23rd United States Colored Troops; 28th United States Colored Troops; 29th United States Colored Troops; 31st United States Colored Troops
	Artillery Brigade Col John C. Tidball	New York Light, 19th Battery; New York Light, 34th Battery

=== Cavalry Corps ===
Division	Brigade	Regiments and Others
Second Division; BG David M. Gregg	1st Brigade BG Henry E. Davies	1st Massachusetts Cavalry; 1st New Jersey Cavalry; 10th New York Cavalry; 24th New York Cavalry; 1st Pennsylvania Cavalry (4 companies); 2nd United States Artillery, Battery A
Second Division; BG David M. Gregg	2nd Brigade Col Michael Kerwin	2nd Pennsylvania Cavalry; 4th Pennsylvania Cavalry; 8th Pennsylvania Cavalry; 13th Pennsylvania Cavalry; 16th Pennsylvania Cavalry; 1st United States Artillery, Batteries H and I
Second Division; BG David M. Gregg	3rd Brigade Col Charles H. Smith	1st Maine Cavalry; 6th Ohio Cavalry; 21st Pennsylvania Cavalry
