= Battle of Boydton Plank Road order of battle =

The order of battle for the Battle of Boydton Plank Road, also known as the Battle of Burgess Mill or the First Battle of Hatcher's Run, includes:

- Battle of Boydton Plank Road order of battle: Confederate
- Battle of Boydton Plank Road order of battle: Union
