= Battle of Boydton Plank Road order of battle: Confederate =

The following Confederate States Army regiments and commanders fought in the Battle of Boydton Plank Road on October 27 to 28, 1864. The Union order of battle is listed separately.

== Abbreviations used ==
=== Military rank ===
- Gen = General
- LTG = Lieutenant General
- MG = Major General
- BG = Brigadier General
- Col = Colonel
- Ltc = Lieutenant Colonel
- Maj = Major

=== Other ===
- (w) = wounded
- (mw) = mortally wounded
- (k) = killed in action
- (c) = captured

== Third Corps ==
MG Henry Heth

Division	Brigade	Regiments and Others
Heth's Division; MG Henry Heth	Davis' Brigade BG Joseph R. Davis	1st Confederate Battalion; 2nd Mississippi Infantry; 11th Mississippi; 26th Mississippi Infantry; 42nd Mississippi Infantry
Heth's Division; MG Henry Heth	Cooke's Brigade BG John R. Cooke	15th North Carolina Infantry; 27th North Carolina Infantry; 46th North Carolina Infantry; 48th North Carolina Infantry; 55th North Carolina Infantry
Heth's Division; MG Henry Heth	MacRae's Brigade BG William MacRae	11th North Carolina Infantry; 26th North Carolina Infantry; 44th North Carolina Infantry; 47th North Carolina Infantry; 52nd North Carolina Infantry
Heth's Division; MG Henry Heth	Archer's Brigade Col R.M. Mayo	13th Alabama Infantry; 1st Tennessee Infantry (Provisional Army); 7th Tennessee Infantry; 14th Tennessee Infantry
Heth's Division; MG Henry Heth	Lane's Brigade, Wilcox's Division BG James H. Lane	18th North Carolina Infantry; 28th North Carolina Infantry; 33rd North Carolina Infantry; 37th North Carolina Infantry
Heth's Division; MG Henry Heth	McGowan's Brigade, Wilcox's Division BG Samuel McGowan	1st South Carolina Infantry (Provisional Army); 12th South Carolina Infantry; 13th South Carolina Infantry; 14th South Carolina Infantry; Orr's Rifles
Mahone's Division; MG William Mahone	Sanders' Brigade Col J. Horace King	8th Alabama Infantry; 9th Alabama Infantry; 10th Alabama Infantry; 11th Alabama Infantry; 13th Alabama Infantry; 14th Alabama Infantry
Mahone's Division; MG William Mahone	Weisiger's Brigade BG David A. Weisiger	6th Virginia Infantry; 12th Virginia Infantry; 16th Virginia Infantry; 41st Virginia Infantry; 61st Virginia Infantry
Mahone's Division; MG William Mahone	Harris' Brigade BG Nathaniel H. Harris	12th Mississippi Infantry; 16th Mississippi Infantry; 19th Mississippi Infantry; 48th Mississippi Infantry

== Cavalry Corps ==
LTG Wade Hampton

Division	Brigade	Regiments and Others
W.H.F. Lee's Division; MG W.H.F. Lee	Barringer's Brigade BG Rufus Barringer	1st North Carolina Cavalry; 2nd North Carolina Cavalry; 3rd North Carolina Cavalry; 5th North Carolina Cavalry
W.H.F. Lee's Division; MG W.H.F. Lee	Beale's Brigade BG Richard L. T. Beale	9th Virginia Cavalry; 10th Virginia Cavalry; 13th Virginia Cavalry
W.H.F. Lee's Division; MG W.H.F. Lee	Dearing's Brigade BG James Dearing	8th Georgia Cavalry; 4th North Carolina Cavalry; 16th North Carolina Cavalry

== Sources ==
- Katcher, Philip. The Army of Robert E. Lee. London, United Kingdom: Arms and Armour Press, 1994. ISBN 1-85409-174-3.
- Trudeau, Noah Andre. The Last Citadel: Petersburg, Virginia June 1864–April 1865. Boston, Massachusetts: Little, Brown and Company, 1991. ISBN 0-316-85327-5.
