= Peter Grace =

Peter Grace may refer to:

- Peter Grace (Medal of Honor) (1845–1914), American soldier and Medal of Honor recipient
- Peter Grace (sound engineer), Australian production sound mixer
- J. Peter Grace (1913–1995), American industrialist
