= Virginia State Route 142 =

State highway in southeastern Virginia, US

State Route 142

Route information
- Maintained by VDOT
- Length: 2.73 mi (4.39 km)
- Existed: 1933–present

Major junctions
- West end: US 1 / US 460 Bus. / SR 1320 near Petersburg
- East end: Halifax Street at CSX railroad crossing in Petersburg

Location
- Country: United States
- State: Virginia
- Counties: Dinwiddie, City of Petersburg

Highway system
- Virginia Routes; Interstate; US; Primary; Secondary; Byways; History; HOT lanes
← SR 141	→ SR 143

State Route 142 (SR 142) is a primary state highway in the U.S. state of Virginia. The state highway runs 2.73 miles (4.39 km) from U.S. Route 1 (US 1) and US 460 Business near Petersburg to the highway's crossing of a CSX rail line in the independent city of Petersburg.

== Route description ==
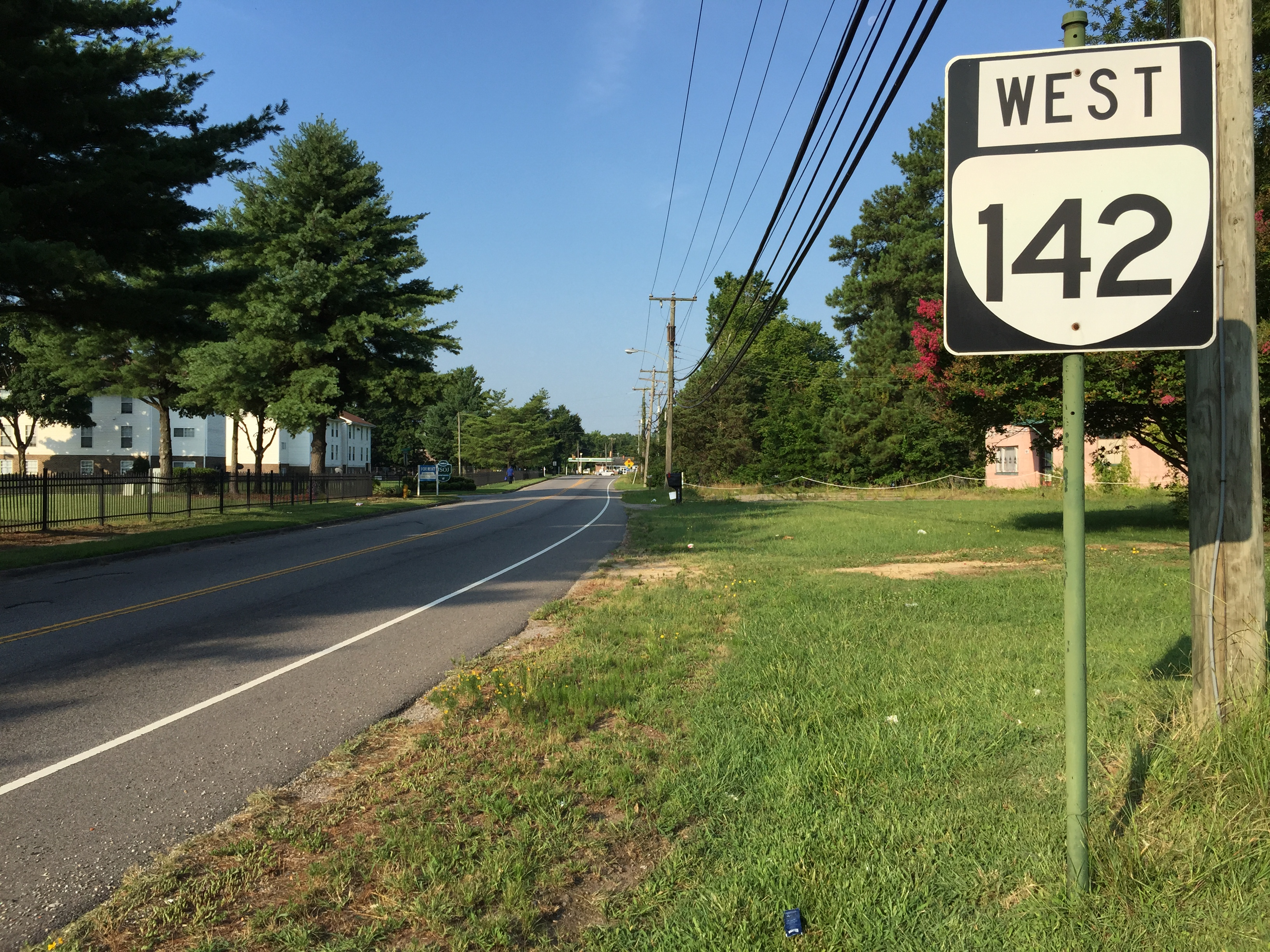
View west along SR 142 in Petersburg

SR 142 begins at an intersection with US 1 and US 460 Business (Boydton Plank Road) just south of the U.S. Highways' interchange with Interstate 85 (I-85, Richmond–Petersburg Turnpike) in eastern Dinwiddie County. The state highway heads east as two-lane undivided Simpson Road, which heads east parallel to I-85 through a sparsely populated area and passes the remains of Fort Gregg. East of the old Confederate fort, SR 142 enters the city of Petersburg and becomes named Boydton Plank Road. The state highway enters a residential area shortly before crossing over I-85 and intersecting Squirrel Level Road, which has a diamond interchange with I-85 to the south. SR 142 intersects Halifax Road and the highway's name changes to Halifax Street shortly before the highway reaches its eastern terminus at its bridge over CSX's North End Subdivision. Halifax Street continues northeast as an unnumbered street toward Old Towne Petersburg.

== Major intersections ==
County	Location	mi	km	Destinations	Notes
Dinwiddie		0.00	0.00	US 1 / US 460 Bus. (Boydton Plank Road) / SR 1320 (Ritchie Avenue) to I-85	Western terminus
Dinwiddie				SR 603 east (Weakley Road)	
Dinwiddie				SR 319 (Seventh Avenue) – Central State Hospital, Southside Virginia Training Center, Hiram W. Davis Medical Center	
City of Petersburg				Squirrel Level Road to I-85	
City of Petersburg		2.73	4.39	Halifax Street	Eastern terminus
1.000 mi = 1.609 km; 1.000 km = 0.621 mi

< SR 438	District 4 State Routes; 1928–1933	SR 440 >
