= James M. Rutter =

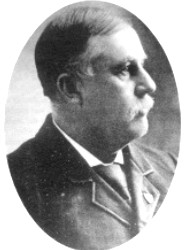
- Born: May 13, 1841; Wilkes-Barre, Pennsylvania
- Died: November 23, 1907 (aged 66); Wilkes-Barre, Pennsylvania
- Burial place: Hollenback Cemetery, Wilkes-Barre, Pennsylvania
- Military career
- Allegiance: United States of America
- Branch: United States Army; Union Army
- Rank: Sergeant
- Unit: 143rd Pennsylvania Infantry Regiment
- Conflicts: Battle of Gettysburg
- Awards: Medal of Honor

James May Rutter (May 13, 1841 – November 23, 1907) was an American soldier who fought for the Union Army during the American Civil War. He received the Medal of Honor for valor.

== Biography ==
Rutter served in the 143rd Pennsylvania Infantry Regiment. He received the Medal of Honor on October 30, 1896, for his actions at the Battle of Gettysburg on July 1, 1863, when he assisted Colonel George N. Reichard, who was wounded, to safety.

== Medal of Honor citation ==
Citation:

At great risk of his life went to the assistance of a wounded comrade, and while under fire removed him to a place of safety.

== See also ==
- List of American Civil War Medal of Honor recipients: Q-S
