= Orpheus S. Woodward =

Orpheus Saeger Woodward
- Born: May 1, 1835; Harborcreek, Pennsylvania
- Died: June 26, 1919 (aged 84); Neosho Falls, Kansas
- Military career
- Allegiance: United States of America; Union
- Branch: United States Army; Union Army
- Rank: Colonel; Brevet Brigadier General
- Commands: 83rd Pennsylvania Infantry
- Conflicts: American Civil War: Battle of Chancellorsville; Battle of Gettysburg

Orpheus Saeger Woodward (May 1, 1835 – June 26, 1919) was a Union Army officer during American Civil War.

== Early life ==
Woodward was born in Harborcreek, Pennsylvania, May 1, 1835. He was a farmer and hardware merchant before the Civil War.

== American Civil war service ==
He started his Civil War service as a private in the Erie, Pennsylvania, Infantry. On September 13, 1861, he was appointed captain of the 83rd Pennsylvania Infantry Regiment.

Woodward was wounded at the Battle of Malvern Hill. He served in the Antietam campaign and fought at the Battle of Chancellorsville and at Little Round Top during the Battle of Gettysburg. He was promoted to colonel of the 83rd Pennsylvania Infantry Regiment on March 28, 1864. Woodward was severely wounded at the Battle of the Wilderness on May 5, 1864, which resulted in his right leg being amputated. He was mustered out of the volunteers on September 20, 1864.

== Legacy ==
On February 24, 1866, President Andrew Johnson nominated Woodward for appointment to the grade of brevet brigadier general of volunteers, to rank from March 13, 1865, and the United States Senate confirmed the appointment on April 10, 1866.

Orpheus Saeger Woodward died at Leavenworth, Kansas, June 26, 1919. He was buried at Cedar Vale Cemetery, Neosho Falls, Kansas.

== See also ==
- List of American Civil War brevet generals (Union)
