= Stephen Rought =

Medal of Honor recipient

Sergeant Stephen Rought
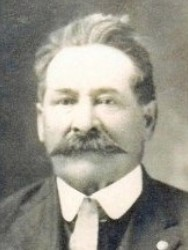
- Born: 3 April 1840; Bradford County, Pennsylvania
- Died: 16 March 1919 (aged 78); Wyalusing, Pennsylvania
- Burial place: Spring Hill Cemetery, Spring Hill, Pennsylvania
- Military career
- Allegiance: United States (Union)
- Branch: Army
- Service years: 1862-1865
- Rank: Sergeant
- Units: Company A, 141st Pennsylvania Infantry
- Conflicts: Wilderness, Virginia
- Awards: Medal of Honor

Stephen Rought (3 April 1840 - 16 March 1919) was a sergeant in the United States Army who was awarded the Medal of Honor for gallantry during the American Civil War. He was awarded the medal on 1 December 1864 for actions performed in May 1864 in the Battle of the Wilderness in Virginia.

== Personal life ==
Rought was born on 3 April 1840 in Bradford County, Pennsylvania to parents George and Catharine Rought. He had an older brother, Jacob Rought. He married Margaret Helen McAllester and fathered 5 children. He died in Wyalusing, Pennsylvania on 16 March 1919 and was buried in Spring Hill Cemetery in Spring Hill, Pennsylvania.

== Military service ==
Rought enlisted in the Army as a corporal on 18 August 1862 at Crampton, Pennsylvania. He was mustered into Company A of the 141st Pennsylvania Infantry. He was promoted to sergeant on 18 November 1862. He was wounded and captured by the Confederates on 3 May 1863 at the Battle of Chancellorsville, but was released soon after. On 6 May 1864, before a charge on the 13th North Carolina Infantry, a veteran unit, Rought found that he had lost his bayonet the night before. During the charge, he killed the Confederate color sergeant with the stock of his musket and captured the unit's flag. For this action, he was awarded the Medal of Honor. He was later seriously wounded on 12 May 1864 at the Battle of Spotsylvania Court House in Virginia and was in a Washington D.C. hospital at the time of his muster out of service on 28 May 1865.

Rought's Medal of Honor citation reads:

The President of the United States of America, in the name of Congress, takes pleasure in presenting the Medal of Honor to Sergeant Stephen Rought, United States Army, for extraordinary heroism on 6 May 1864, while serving with Company A, 141st Pennsylvania Infantry, in action during the Wilderness Campaign, Virginia, for capture of flag of 13th North Carolina Infantry (Confederate States of America).

— E. M. Stanton, Secretary of War
