= Jacob E. Swap =

Private Jacob E. Swap
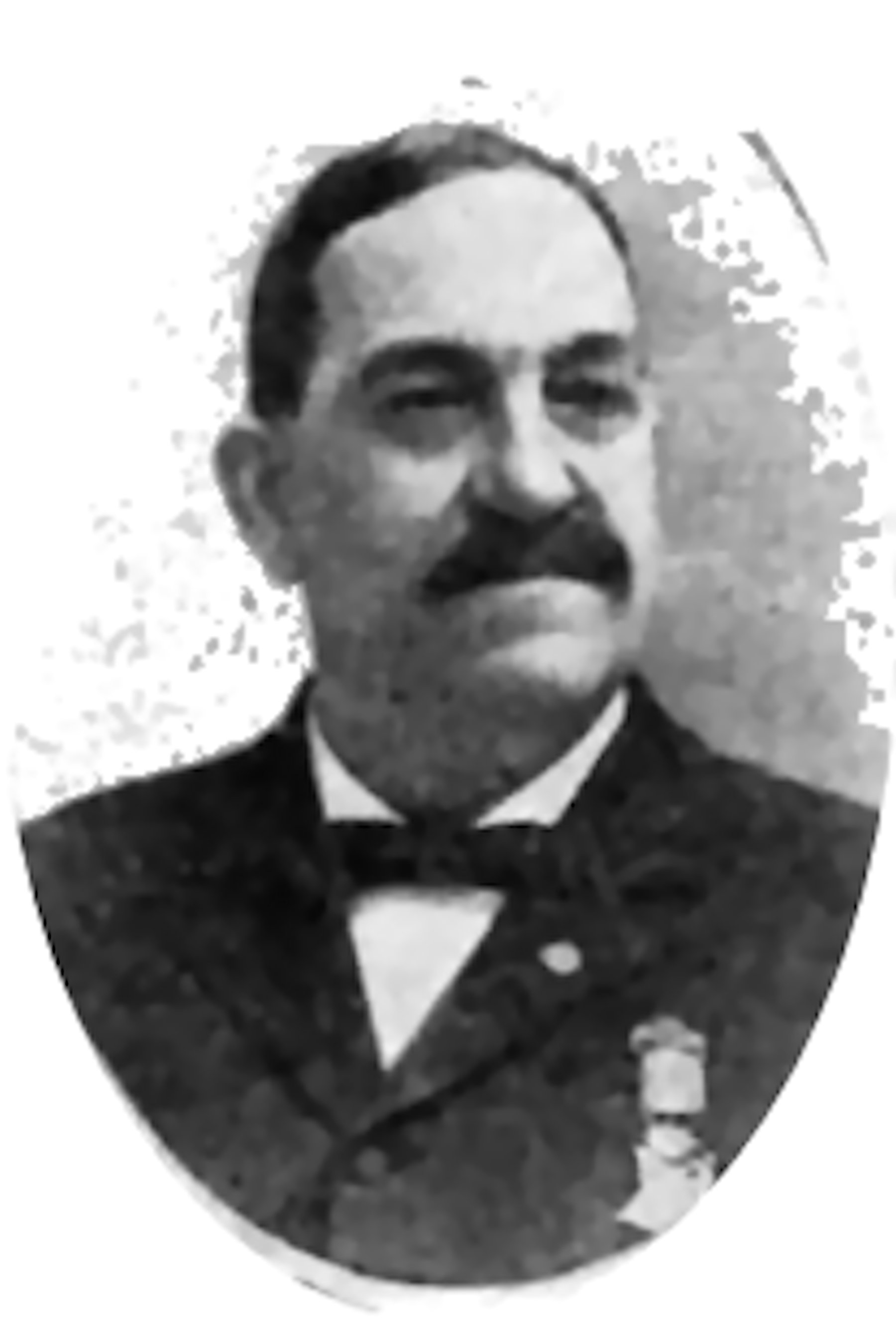
- Born: 12 August 1846; Coeymans, Albany County, New York, US
- Died: 22 January 1925 (aged 78); Lakeport, Lake County, California, US
- Burial place: Evergreen Cemetery, Oakland, California
- Military career
- Allegiance: United States
- Branch: Army
- Service years: 1861–1865
- Rank: Private
- Units: Company H, 83rd Pennsylvania Infantry
- Conflicts: Battle of the Wilderness
- Awards: Medal of Honor

Jacob E. Swap (12 August 1846 – 22 January 1925) was a private in the United States Army who was awarded the Medal of Honor for actions performed on 5 May 1864 at the Battle of the Wilderness during the American Civil War.

== Personal life ==
Swap was born on 12 August 1846 in Coeymans, New York to parents William and Amanda Swap. He was married to Angeline L. Swap. After being discharged from the Army, he served as a district judge in western Pennsylvania and also worked in railroading. After the death of Angeline in 1923, he relocated to Lakeport, California until his death on 22 January 1925. He was buried in Evergreen Cemetery in Oakland, California.

== Military service ==
Swap enlisted in the Army at age 15 on 29 August 1861 at Springs, Pennsylvania. He was mustered into H Company of the 83rd Pennsylvania Infantry. On 1 May 1864, Swap was ill as his regiment prepared to depart from Rappahannock Station, Virginia. However, Swap refused to be admitted to the hospital, instead making multiple attempts over the next few days to join the ranks. On 5 May, he succeeded in trading his station guarding the regiment's supplies to a battle-weary comrade and fought in the Battle of the Wilderness on the 6th, 7th, and 8th. On 8 May, he was wounded 5 times during an attack and was captured by Confederate forces, remaining a POW until the end of the war.

Swap's Medal of Honor citation reads:

The President of the United States of America, in the name of Congress, takes pleasure in presenting the Medal of Honor to Private Jacob E. Swap, United States Army, for extraordinary heroism on 5 May 1864, while serving with Company H, 83d Pennsylvania Infantry, in action during the Wilderness Campaign, Virginia. Although assigned to other duty, Private Swap voluntarily joined his regiment in a charge and fought with it until severely wounded.

— D. S. Lamont, Secretary of War

Swap was discharged from the Army for disability on 14 May 1865.
