= Guy H. Watkins =

American lawyer

- Born: Guy Hulett Watkins; March 19, 1831; Towanda, Pennsylvania
- Died: June 18, 1864 (aged 33); Petersburg, Virginia
- Occupations: Lawyer, Soldier

Guy Hulett Watkins (1831–1864) was a lawyer and United States Army Lieutenant Colonel during the American Civil War.

== Formative years ==
Watkins was born in Towanda, Pennsylvania, and completed his education at a seminary in Lima, New York.

== Legal and political career ==
After completing his education, he joined the law practice of his father, William Watkins, where he was trained to become an attorney. He was subsequently admitted to the bar on September 9, 1853.

In 1859, he was elected district attorney.

=== American Civil War ===
Watkins had not yet finished his term as district attorney when southern states began to secede from the Union in 1860 and was still a sitting district attorney when the American Civil War began in April 1861. As the war continued into its second year, he decided to enroll for military service and was commissioned as an officer with the 141st Pennsylvania Infantry Regiment, a newly-formed, infantry regiment of the Pennsylvania Volunteers that was established at Camp Curtin in Harrisburg, Pennsylvania on August 29, 1862.

=== 1862 ===
One of the officers who commanded the members of the 141st Pennsylvania Volunteer Infantry as it marched up the Potomac River to Leesburg, Virginia and on to Falmouth from October 11 to November 19, 1862, as part of the Union Army forces assembled in the region, Watkins also commanded men in the intense combat of the Battle of Fredericksburg, Virginia from December 12 to 15 that year.

=== 1863 ===
From January 20 to 24, 1863, Watkins and his men took part in the ill-fated "Mud March" spearheaded by Union Army Major General Ambrose Burnside. They were then assigned to occupation duties at Falmouth until April, when they were ordered to move toward Charlottesville. Participants in the Union's Chancellorsville Campaign from April 27 to May 6, they endured their second major combat experience during the Battle of Chancellorsville from May 1 to 5.

Ordered to proceed to the Commonwealth of Pennsylvania to defend the state and its residents from Confederate States Army troops commanded by Robert E. Lee, Watkins and his men were subsequently engaged in halting the CSA's Gettysburg Campaign from June 11 to July 24, during which time they fought in their third major battle, the Battle of Gettysburg, which took place from July 1 to 3, 1863.

Given little time to rest, Watkins and his men were ordered to pursue Lee and his troops, which they did, marching rapidly through Pennsylvania, Maryland, and on into Virginia from July 5 to 23, where they re-engaged with the enemy at Wapping Heights on July 23.

Assigned to line duties along the Rappahannock and Rapidan rivers through early October, they were then reassigned to the Union's Bristoe Campaign from October 9 to 22, during which time they fought in the First Battle of Auburn on October 13.

Ordered to advance to the Union Army's line on the Rappahannock from November 7 to 8, they next fought in the Battle of Kelly's Ford on November 7. Assigned next to the Union's Mine Run Campaign from November 26 to December 2, 1863, they fought Confederate troops again, this time in the Battle of Payne's Farm on November 27.

=== 1864 ===
From February 6 to 7, 1864, Watkins and his fellow 141st Pennsylvania Volunteers participated in the Union's Demonstration on the Rapidan and then in the Rapidan Campaign from May 4 to June 12, during which time they fought in the Battle of the Wilderness from May 5 to 7 and the Battle of Laurel Hill on May 8, gained control of areas in and around Spotsylvania from May 8 to 12 and the Po River on May 10, fought in the Battle of Spotsylvania Court House from May 12 to 21, assaulted the salient near there on May 12, engaged the enemy near the Harris Farm on May 19, and fought in the Battle of North Anna from May 23 to 26. Assigned to line duties on the Pamunkey River from May 26 to 28, they next fought in the Battle of Totopotomoy Creek from May 28 to 31 and in the long and brutal Battle of Cold Harbor from June 1 to 12.

Moved into position in preparation for military actions against the CSA troops that had dug in to protect the city of Petersburg, Virginia, Watkins and his men subsequently took part in the Siege of Petersburg, beginning on June 16, 1864.

== Death ==
Watkins was killed during the Siege of Petersburg in Virginia on June 18, 1864.
