= Osgood T. Hadley =

American Civil War recipient of the Medal of Honor

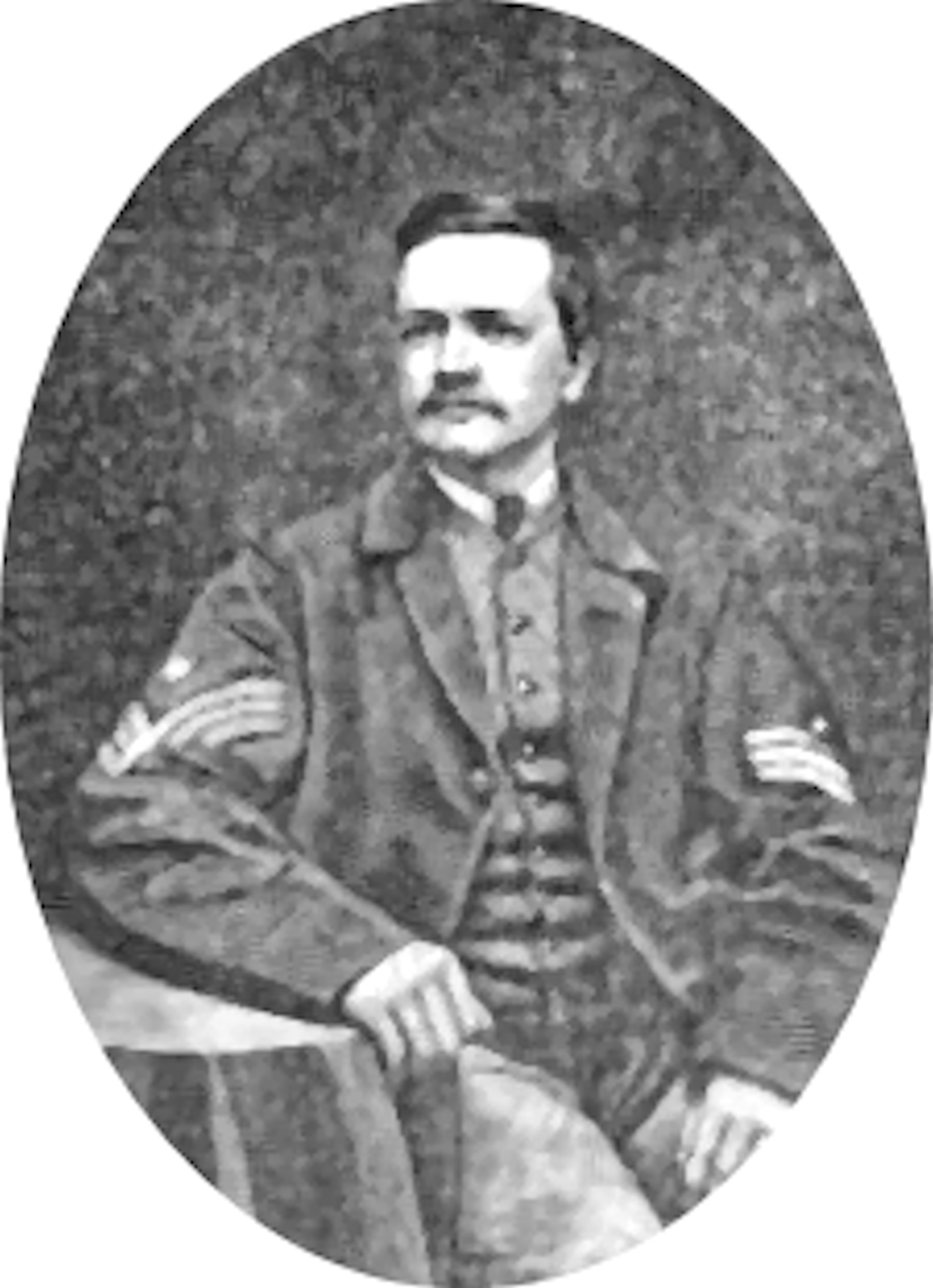
- Born: January 19, 1838; Nashua, New Hampshire, US
- Died: October 5, 1914 (aged 76)
- Burial place: Worcester County, Massachusetts, US
- Military career
- Allegiance: United States
- Branch: US Army
- Rank: Sergeant
- Units: Company E, 6th New Hampshire Volunteer Infantry
- Conflicts: American Civil War
- Awards: Medal of Honor

Osgood Towns Hadley (January 19, 1838 – October 5, 1914) was a Union Army soldier in the American Civil War who received the U.S. military's highest decoration, the Medal of Honor.

Hadley was born in Nashua, New Hampshire, on January 19, 1838. He married Susan F Carter of Peterborough, New Hampshire, on November 14, 1860. She died September 17, 1861, and Hadley enlisted and was mustered into Federal service November 27, 1861, at Peterborough, New Hampshire.

He was awarded the Medal of Honor for extraordinary heroism on September 30, 1864, while serving as a corporal with Company E, 6th New Hampshire Volunteer Infantry, at Pegram House, Virginia. Despite heavy enemy fire, Corporal Hadley retrieved and defended his colors and brought it back to his regiment. His Medal of Honor was issued, on July 27, 1896.

After returning to New Hampshire, he married Sarah Naomi Ball on September 22, 1865. She died July 4, 1867. The twice-widowed Hadley married a third time on November 25, 1868, to Lucy H. Brown Hadley. They had a son Willis Osgood Hadley (1870–1916) before she also died on January 15, 1871.

He died at the age of 76, on October 5, 1914, having outlived three wives, and was buried at the Southborough Rural Cemetery in Worcester County, Massachusetts. His son only survived him by two years, dying at the Glencliffe Sanitorium from tuberculosis at age 45.

The Osgood T. Hadley Memorial Bridge in Southborough, Massachusetts, is named in his honor.

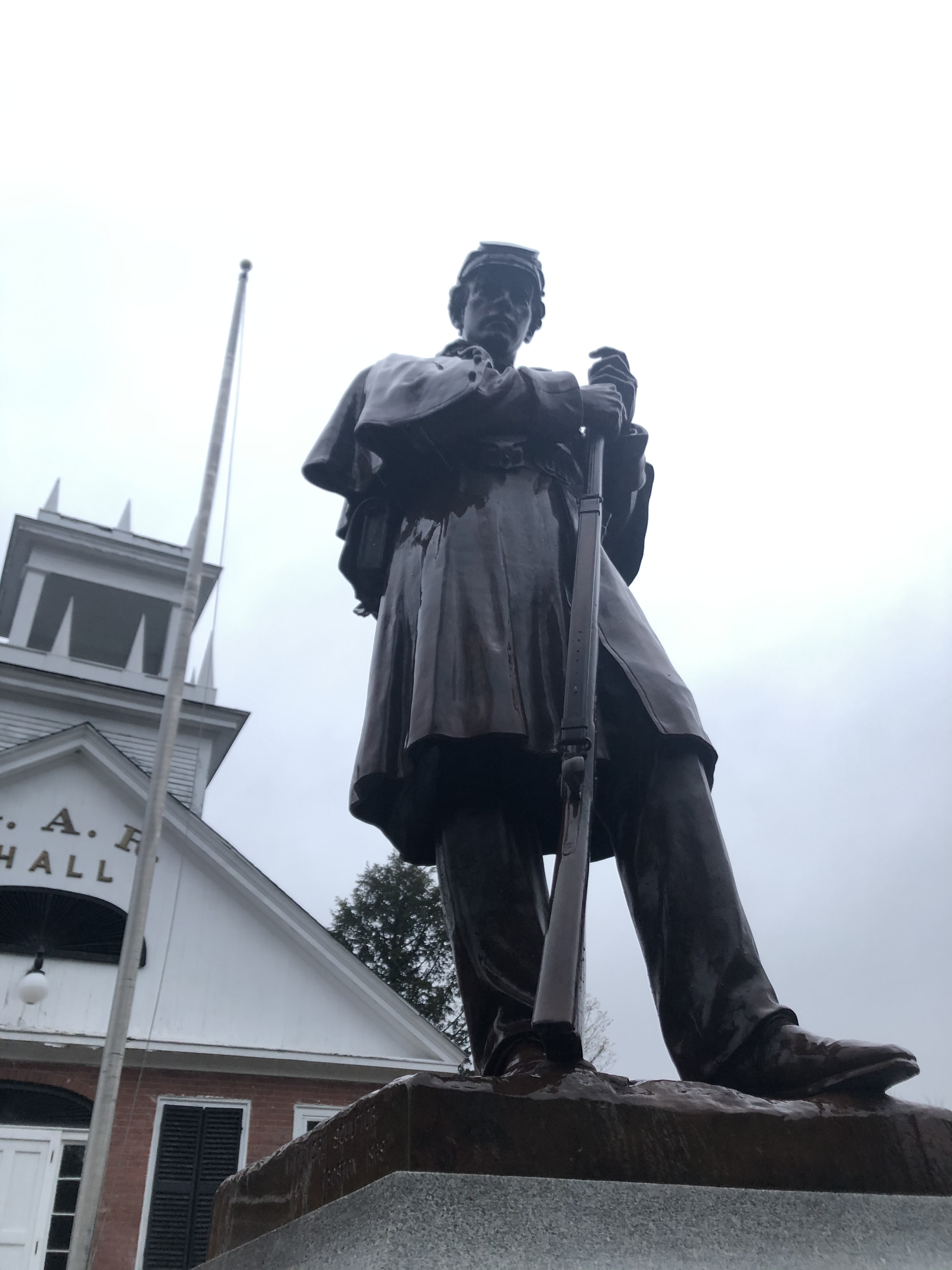
Osgood Hadley Statue Photo by: Sgt. Cullen Tiernan, USMC (Ret)

== Medal of Honor citation ==
The President of the United States of America, in the name of Congress, takes pleasure in presenting the Medal of Honor to Corporal Osgood Towns Hadley, United States Army, for extraordinary heroism on 30 September 1864, while serving with Company E, 6th New Hampshire Veteran Infantry, in action at Pegram House, Virginia. As Color Bearer of his regiment Corporal Hadley defended his colors with great personal gallantry and brought them safely out of the action.
