= Henry J. Madill =

American general (1829–1899)

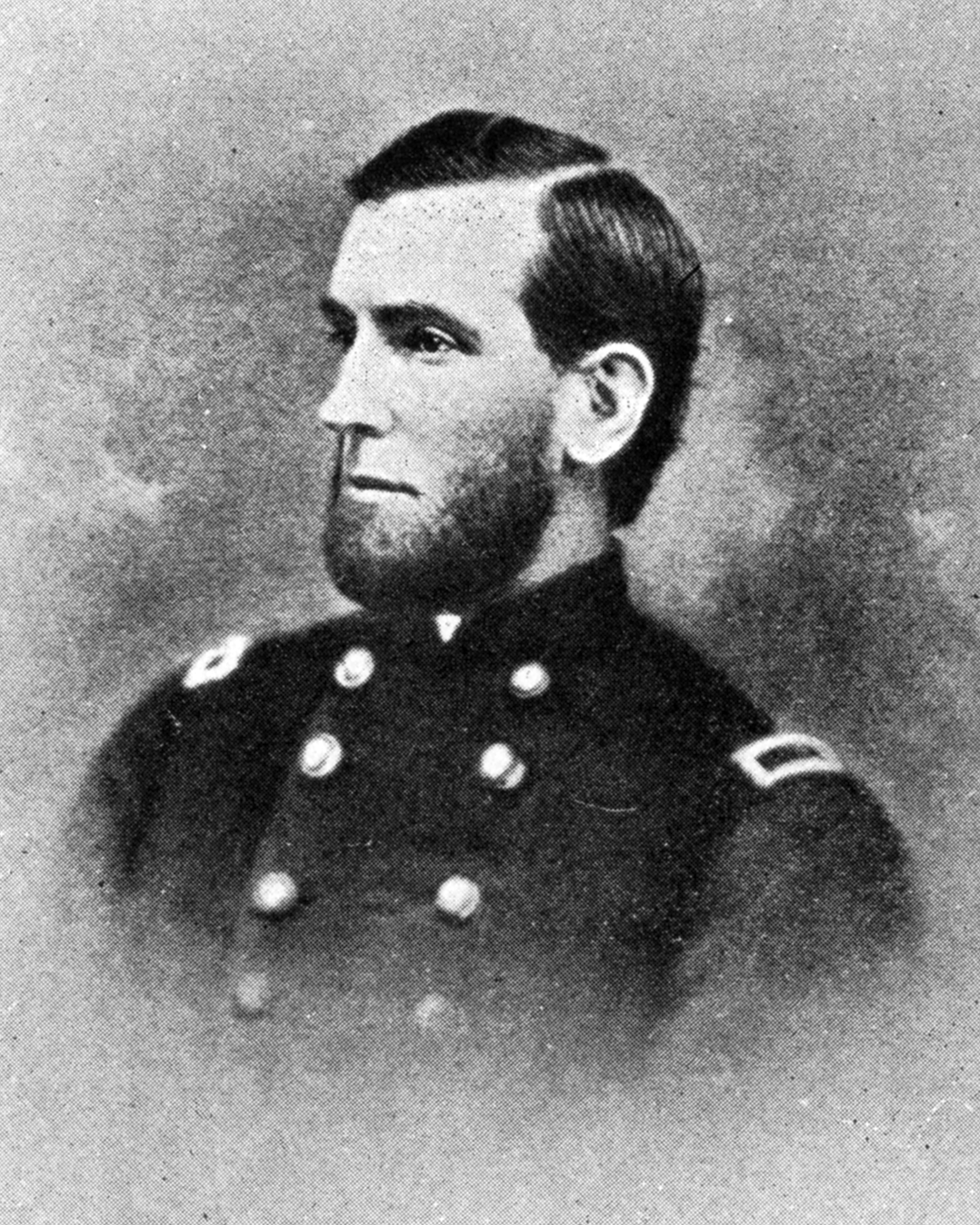
- Birth name: Henry John Madill
- Born: March 30, 1829; Hunterstown, Pennsylvania, U.S.
- Died: June 29, 1899 (aged 70); Wysox, Pennsylvania, U.S.
- Allegiance: United States
- Branch: Union Army
- Rank: Major General
- Commands: 6th Pennsylvania Reserves; 141st Pennsylvania Infantry
- Battles / wars: American Civil War: Battle of Manassas Gap

Henry John Madill (30 March 1829, Hunterstown, Pennsylvania – 29 June 1899, Wysox, Pennsylvania) The son of Scotch-Irish emigrant Dr. Alexander Madill, was a lawyer and U.S. Army Colonel during the American Civil War. Madill was privately educated, and was admitted to the bar of Bradford County in 1851. He was elected major of the 6th Pennsylvania Reserves on June 22, 1861. On August 30, 1862, he was appointed colonel of the 141st Pennsylvania Infantry. On July 23, 1863, he commanded a brigade at The Battle of Manassas Gap. Madill was brevetted brigadier general December 2, 1864 by presidential order. He was brevetted major general of volunteers on March 15, 1865. Madill was wounded three times and had six horses shot from under him.
