= Boydton and Petersburg Plank Road =

The Boydton and Petersburg Plank Road, also called the Boydton Plank Road, was a hard surfaced road constructed between Boydton and Petersburg, Virginia, built between 1850 and 1853. It not only increased revenues for farm products and local industries by 100%, but was also the scene of a major Civil War conflicts, such as the Battle of Boydton Plank Road and the Battle of Peebles's Farm.

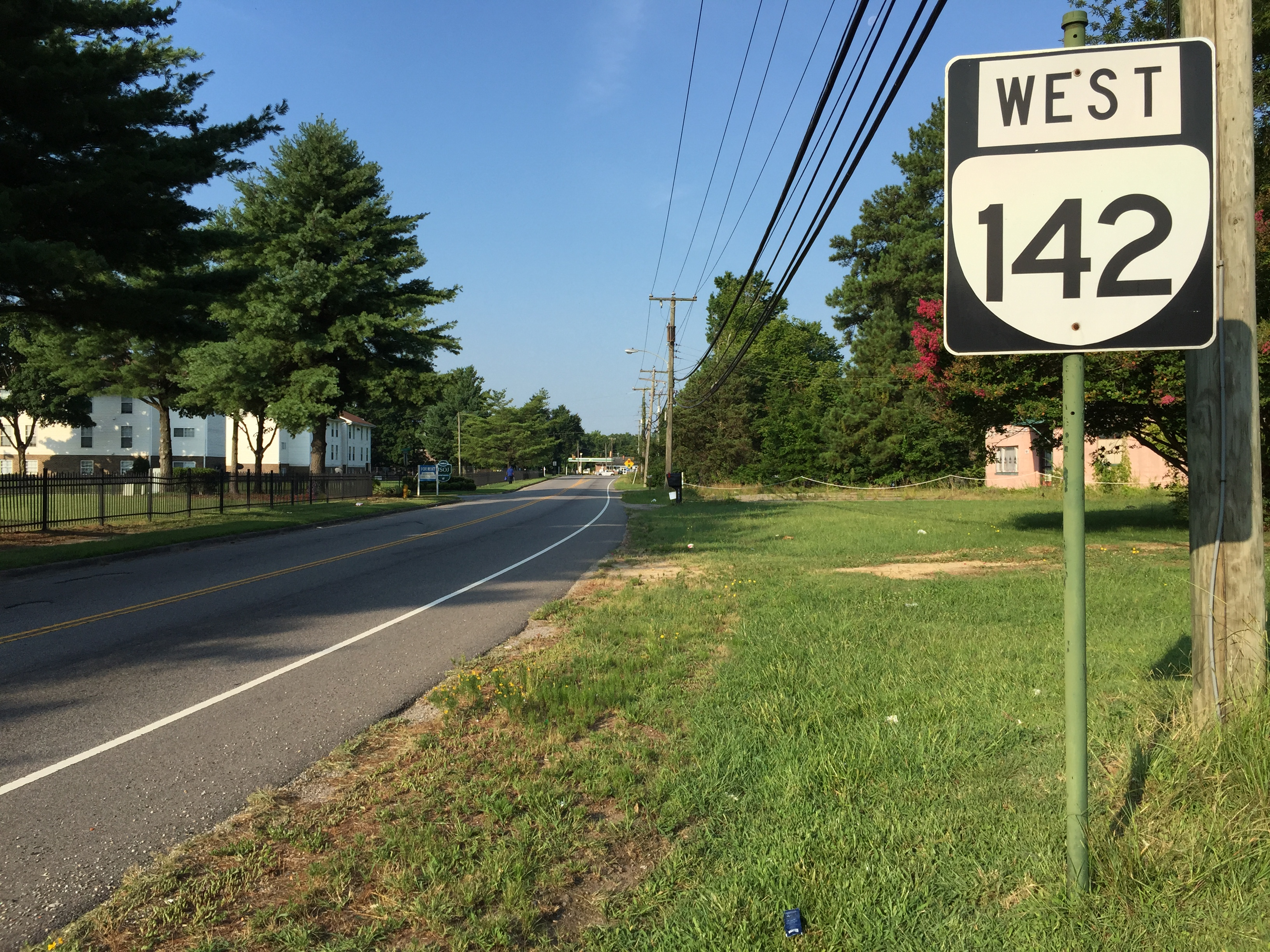
View west along Virginia State Route 142 (Boydton Plank Road) at Westfall Drive in Petersburg, Virginia.

The road was about 80 miles (130 km) long between the two cities. The mud and sorry conditions of the roads in the area reduced farm products by one fourth of their value due to delays and damage to the wagon cargoes. It had originally been planned to make the road surface macadamized, but the lack of nearby stone made the plan uneconomical. The road would begin in Petersburg, then pass through Dinwiddie County and across the Nottoway River in the neighborhood of Birch's Bridge, then through Brunswick County near the Ebeneezer Academy, then across the Meherrin River at Gee's bridge, through South Hill, and on to Boydton in Mecklenburg County, Virginia.

According to a public sign and historic display in Boydton,

The Boydton and Petersburg Plank Road, built between 1851 and 1853, was the first all-weather route connecting Southside Virginia's tobacco and wheat farms with the market. Pine and oak planks, 8 feet [2.4 m] long, 1 foot [0.30 m] wide and 3 to 4 inches [7.6 to 10.2 cm] thick were laid across paralleled beams slanted toward a ditch. The road boosted crop revenues 30 to 100 percent. Along the approximately 73 miles [117 km], there were 7 toll houses and keepers. Stagecoaches drove the 73 miles Monday through Saturday, stopping every 11 miles [18 km] for food and fresh teams. Condemned by 1860, it nonetheless provided an important route for troop movements during the Civil War. Another continuous hard-surface link would not exist until 1930s. Parts of some highways, including U.S. 1, follow the old roadbed, and Petersburg still has a thoroughfare called Boydton Plank Road. A ten-mile [16 km] extension to the Roanoke River at Clarksville was completed in 1856. Boydton Plank Road was mentioned numerous times in Robert E. Lee's dispatches to President Jefferson Davis and Secretary of War John C. Breckenridge during the last days the Confederate Army was in Petersburg during the final days of the Civil War.

In good weather, a Stagecoach going between Petersburg and Boydton would make the trip in about 13 hours. The coaches would leave Boydton and Petersburg respectively at 5:00 a.m., pass each other midway, and arrive at their destinations at about 6:00 p.m. on Tuesdays, Thursdays and Saturdays.

There was an extension of the roadbed to Clarksville, Virginia, that was constructed in 1856.

The Boydton and Petersburg Plank Road was built between 1851 and 1853 and was funded by stock bought by the state as well as the public. The all-weather toll road increased the transportation of crops to market and also carried stagecoach traffic between Boydton and Petersburg. The road was constructed of pine and oak planks eight feet [2.4 m] long, one foot [0.30 m] wide, and three to four inches [7.6 to 10.2 cm] thick laid across parallel beams, slanted slightly to improve drainage. A ten-foot-wide [3.0 m] shoulder let vehicles pass each other. By 1860 the road, except for an 1856 extension to Clarksville, was declared unsafe, due to heavy wear, poorly suited untreated lumber, and the collapse of the Meherrin River Bridge.

The road was condemned in sections in 1860, and finally the roadbed was sold to pay off their debts. Afterwards, parts of the roadbed were sold off by auction in sections. The section between Boydton and Clarksville was still good, so that section was continued as a toll road through the Civil War. The section between Lombardy Grove and Boydton was sold to Mecklenburg County for $1,500.00.
