= Paul Ambrose Oliver =

American Civil War Medal of Honor recipient

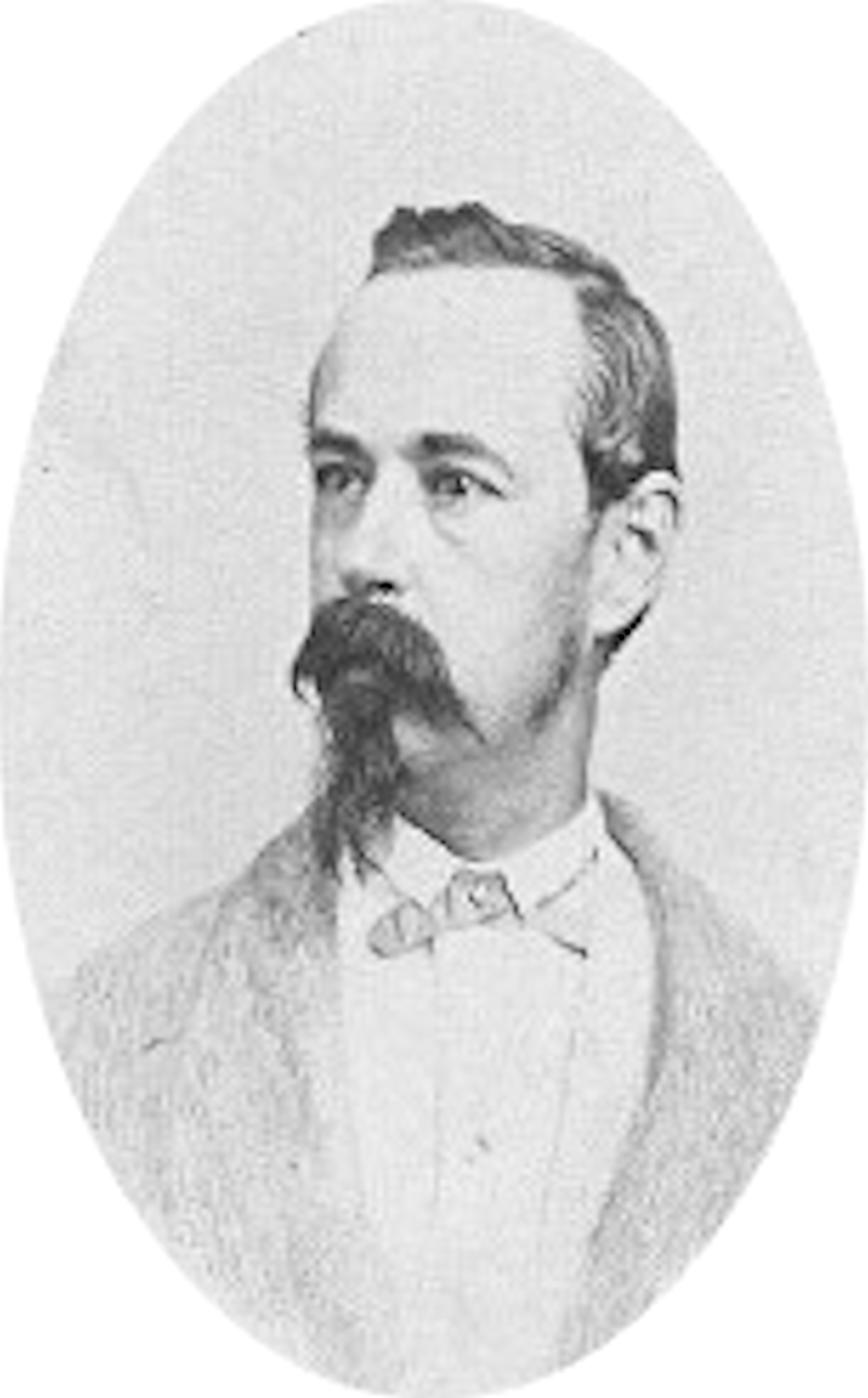
- Oliver in 1875
- Born: July 18, 1831; English Channel
- Died: May 17, 1912 (aged 80); Laurel Run, Pennsylvania
- Military career
- Allegiance: United States of America: Union
- Branch: Union Army
- Rank: Captain; Bvt. Brigadier General
- Units: (New York (state)) Company D, 12th New York Volunteer Infantry
- Conflicts: American Civil War
- Awards: Medal of Honor

Paul Ambrose Oliver (July 18, 1831 – May 17, 1912) was an American explosives inventor, American Civil War Union Army captain and staff officer who was appointed to the brevet grade of brigadier general and Medal of Honor recipient. He was born on the ship Louisiana, his father's merchant ship, during one of its voyages in the English Channel. Before the Civil War, he worked as a shipping merchant.

In January 1862, Oliver joined the 12th New York Volunteer Infantry as a second lieutenant. During the war, he served as an aide to no fewer than four generals, including Daniel Butterfield, George Meade, Joseph Hooker and Gouverneur K. Warren. While he accepted a promotion to captain in April 1864, he declined further promotions. On March 8, 1865, President Abraham Lincoln nominated Oliver for appointment as a brevet brigadier general to rank from March 8, 1865, and the U.S. Senate confirmed the appointment on March 10, 1865. Oliver resigned his commission on May 6, 1865.

Oliver was an inventor and powder manufacturer after the Civil War. He was also a companion of the Pennsylvania Commandery of the Military Order of the Loyal Legion of the United States.

Paul Ambrose Oliver died May 17, 1912, at Laurel Run, Pennsylvania. He was buried at Green-Wood Cemetery, Brooklyn, New York.

== Medal of Honor citation ==
Rank and organization: Captain, Company D, 12th New York Infantry. Place and date: Resaca, Ga., 15 May 1864. Entered service at: New York, N.Y. Born: 18 July 1831, at sea in the English Channel. Date of issue: 12 October 1892.

While acting as aide assisted in preventing a disaster caused by Union troops firing into each other.

== See also ==
- List of American Civil War brevet generals (Union)
