= Peter Grace (Medal of Honor) =

US Army officer and Civil War Medal of Honor recipient (1845–1914)

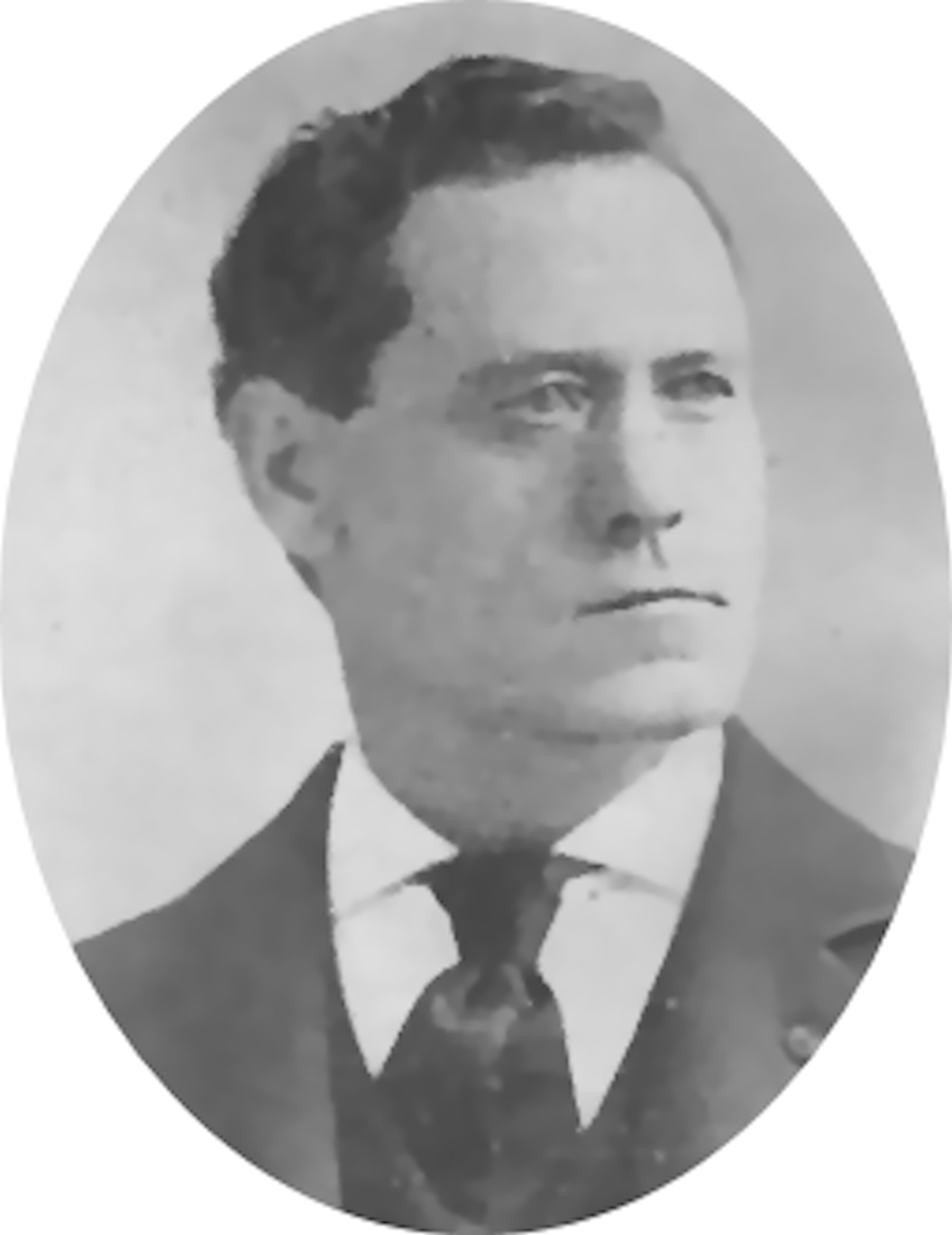
- Medal of Honor recipient Peter Grace
- Born: March 18, 1845; Berkshire, Massachusetts, US
- Died: March 27, 1914 (aged 69)
- Burial place: Arlington National Cemetery
- Military career
- Allegiance: United States of America
- Branch: United States Army
- Service years: 1861–1865
- Rank: Captain
- Units: Company G, 83rd Pennsylvania Volunteer Infantry Regiment
- Conflicts: Battle of the Wilderness; American Civil War
- Awards: Medal of Honor

Peter Grace (March 18, 1845 – March 27, 1914) was an American soldier who fought in the American Civil War. Grace received his country's highest award for bravery during combat, the Medal of Honor. Grace's medal was won for his heroism during the Battle of the Wilderness in Virginia on May 5, 1864. He was honored with the award on December 27, 1894.

Grace was born in Berkshire, Massachusetts, where he entered service. He is buried at Arlington National Cemetery in Virginia.

== Medal of Honor citation ==
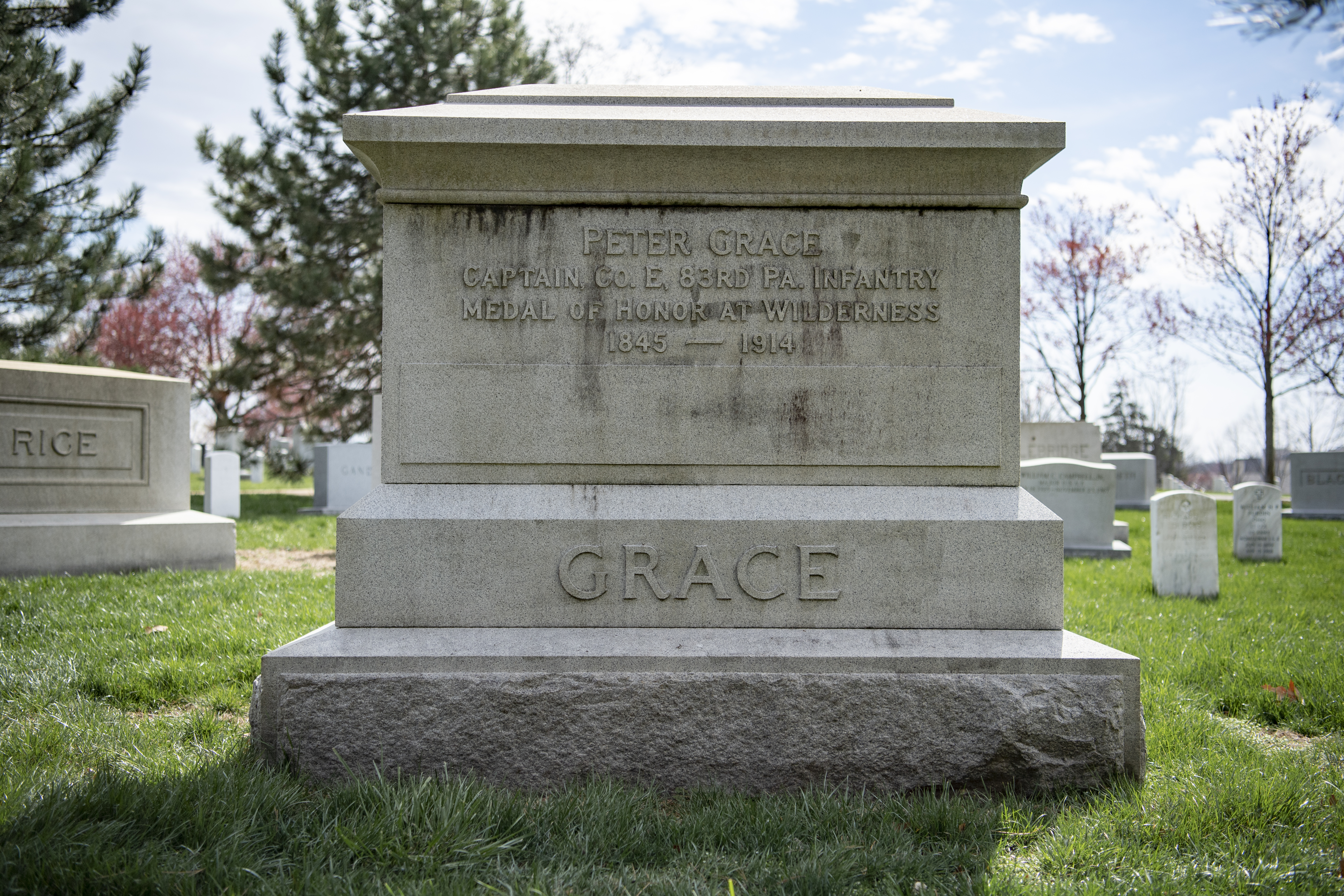
Grave at Arlington National Cemetery

The President of the United States of America, in the name of Congress, takes pleasure in presenting the Medal of Honor to Sergeant Peter Grace, United States Army, for extraordinary heroism on 5 May 1864, while serving with Company G, 83d Pennsylvania Infantry, in action during the Wilderness Campaign, Virginia. Single-handed, Sergeant Grace rescued a comrade from two Confederate guards, knocking down one and compelling surrender of the other.

== See also ==
- List of American Civil War Medal of Honor recipients: G–L
