= 143rd Pennsylvania Infantry Regiment =

Union Army infantry regiment

143rd Pennsylvania Volunteer Infantry
- Active: October 18, 1862 – June 12, 1865
- Country: United States of America
- Allegiance: Union
- Branch: Infantry
- Engagements: Battle of Chancellorsville; Battle of Gettysburg; Bristoe Campaign; Battle of the Wilderness; Battle of Spotsylvania Court House; Battle of Totopotomoy Creek; Battle of Cold Harbor; Siege of Petersburg; Battle of Globe Tavern; Battle of Boydton Plank Road; Battle of Hatcher's Run

The 143rd Pennsylvania Volunteer Infantry was an infantry regiment that served in the Union Army during the American Civil War.

== Service ==
The 143rd Pennsylvania Infantry was organized at Wilkes-Barre, Pennsylvania, and mustered in for a three year enlistment on October 18, 1862 under the command of Colonel Edmund Lovell Dana.

The regiment was attached to 1st Brigade, Defenses of Washington, north of the Potomac River, to January 1863. 2nd Brigade, 3rd Division, I Corps, Army of the Potomac, to December 1863. 1st Brigade, 3rd Division, I Corps, to March 1864. 3rd Brigade, 4th Division, V Corps, to June 1864. 1st Brigade, 1st Division, V Corps, to September 1864. 1st Brigade, 3rd Division, V Corps, to February 1865. Hart's Island, New York Harbor, Department of the East, to June 1865.

The 143rd Pennsylvania Infantry mustered out June 12, 1865.

== Detailed service ==
Left Pennsylvania for Washington, D.C., November 7, and served duty in the defenses of that city until January 17, 1863. Ordered to join the Army of the Potomac in the field January 1863. Duty at Belle Plains, Va., until April 27. Chancellorsville Campaign April 27-May 6. Operations at Pollock's Mill Creek April 29-May 2. Battle of Chancellorsville May 2–5. Gettysburg Campaign June 11-July 24. Battle of Gettysburg July 1–3. Pursuit of Lee July 5–24. Duty at Bealeton Station until October. Bristoe Campaign October 9–22. Haymarket October 19. Advance to line of the Rappahannock November 7–8. Warrenton November 7. Guard at Manassas Junction November 22-December 5. Demonstration on the Rapidan February 6–7, 1864. Duty near Culpeper until May. Rapidan Campaign May 4-June 12. Battle of the Wilderness May 5–7. Laurel Hill May 8. Spotsylvania May 8–12. Spotsylvania Court House May 12–21. Assault on the Salient May 12. North Anna River May 23–26. Jericho Ford May 25. On line of the Pamunkey May 26–28. Totopotomoy May 28–31. Cold Harbor June 1–12. Bethesda Church June 1–3. Before Petersburg June 16–18. Siege of Petersburg June 16, 1864 to February 10, 1865. Mine Explosion July 30, 1864 (reserve). Weldon Railroad August 18–21. Boydton Plank Road, Hatcher's Run, October 27–28. Warren's Raid to Weldon Railroad December 7–12. Dabney's Mills, Hatcher's Run, February 5–7, 1865. Ordered to New York February 10. Assigned to duty at Hart's Island, New York Harbor, guarding prison camp, and escorting recruits and convalescents to the front until June.

== Casualties ==
The regiment lost a total of 303 men during service; 8 officers and 143 enlisted men killed or mortally wounded, 2 officers and 150 enlisted men died of disease.

== Commanders ==
- Colonel Edmund L. Dana
- Lieutenant Colonel John D. Musser - killed in action at the Battle of the Wilderness, May 6, 1864
- Lieutenant Colonel George Nicholas Reichard
- Captain Chester K. Hughes - commanded at the Battle of Globe Tavern

== Notable members ==
- Sergeant Patrick DeLacy, Company A - Medal of Honor recipient for action at the Battle of the Wilderness
- James M. Rutter, Company C - Medal of Honor recipient for action at the Battle of Gettysburg

== Reenactment and Living History ==
Currently there is a group based in Northeast Pennsylvania which portrays the 143rd Pennsylvania, participating in local and regional living history and battle reenactments. Facebook: 143rd Pennsylvania Instagram: 143rdpa

== See also ==
- List of Pennsylvania Civil War Units
- Pennsylvania in the Civil War
