= Patrick DeLacy =

American soldier who fought in the American Civil War

- Born: November 25, 1835; Carbondale, Pennsylvania, US
- Died: April 27, 1915 (aged 79); Pennsylvania, US
- Burial place: Saint Catherine's Cemetery, Moscow, Pennsylvania
- Military career
- Allegiance: United States
- Branch: United States Army; Union Army
- Rank: Captain (Mustered out of the army as a lieutenant)
- Unit: 143rd Pennsylvania Volunteer Infantry Regiment - Company A
- Awards: Medal of Honor; Civil War Campaign Medal

Patrick DeLacy (November 25, 1835 – April 27, 1915) was an American soldier who fought in the American Civil War. DeLacy received the country's highest award for bravery during combat, the Medal of Honor, for his action during the Battle of the Wilderness in Virginia on 6 May 1864. He was honored with the award on 24 April 1894.

== Biography ==
DeLacy was born in Carbondale, Pennsylvania on 25 November 1835. He enlisted in the 143rd Pennsylvania Infantry. He was promoted from private to sergeant major to lieutenant before he was mustered out of the army in June 1865. He was posthumously promoted to the rank of captain on June 8, 1987, due to the efforts of Elizabeth Hicks Jaquinot. He died on 27 April 1915. He earned his Medal of Honor on 6 May 1864 when he shot a Confederate color bearer and captured the flag of the 1st South Carolina Infantry regiment. He went back to Pennsylvania with his regiment in June 1865. He fathered two more children after the war, settled down, eventually becoming an older man in Scranton. Active in Veteran's organizations, DeLacy served as President of the Medal of Honor Legion of the United States and Commander of the Pennsylvania department of the Grand Army of the Republic. He died of pneumonia on April 27, 1915 in Scranton. [Bates, History of the Pennsylvania Volunteers]

== Medal of Honor citation ==
Running ahead of the line, under a concentrated fire, he shot the color bearer of a Confederate regiment on the works, thus contributing to the success of the attack.

== See also ==
- List of American Civil War Medal of Honor recipients: A–F
