= 97th New York Infantry Regiment =

- Active: February 18, 1862 - July 18, 1865
- Country: United States
- Allegiance: Union
- Branch: Infantry
- Nickname: Conkling Rifles
- Engagements: Battle of Cedar Mountain; Second Battle of Bull Run; Battle of South Mountain; Battle of Antietam; Battle of Fredericksburg; Battle of Chancellorsville; Battle of Gettysburg; Bristoe Campaign; Mine Run Campaign; Battle of the Wilderness; Battle of Spotsylvania Court House; Battle of Totopotomoy Creek; Battle of Cold Harbor; Siege of Petersburg; Battle of Globe Tavern; Battle of Hatcher's Run; Appomattox Campaign; Battle of Five Forks; Third Battle of Petersburg; Battle of Appomattox Court House

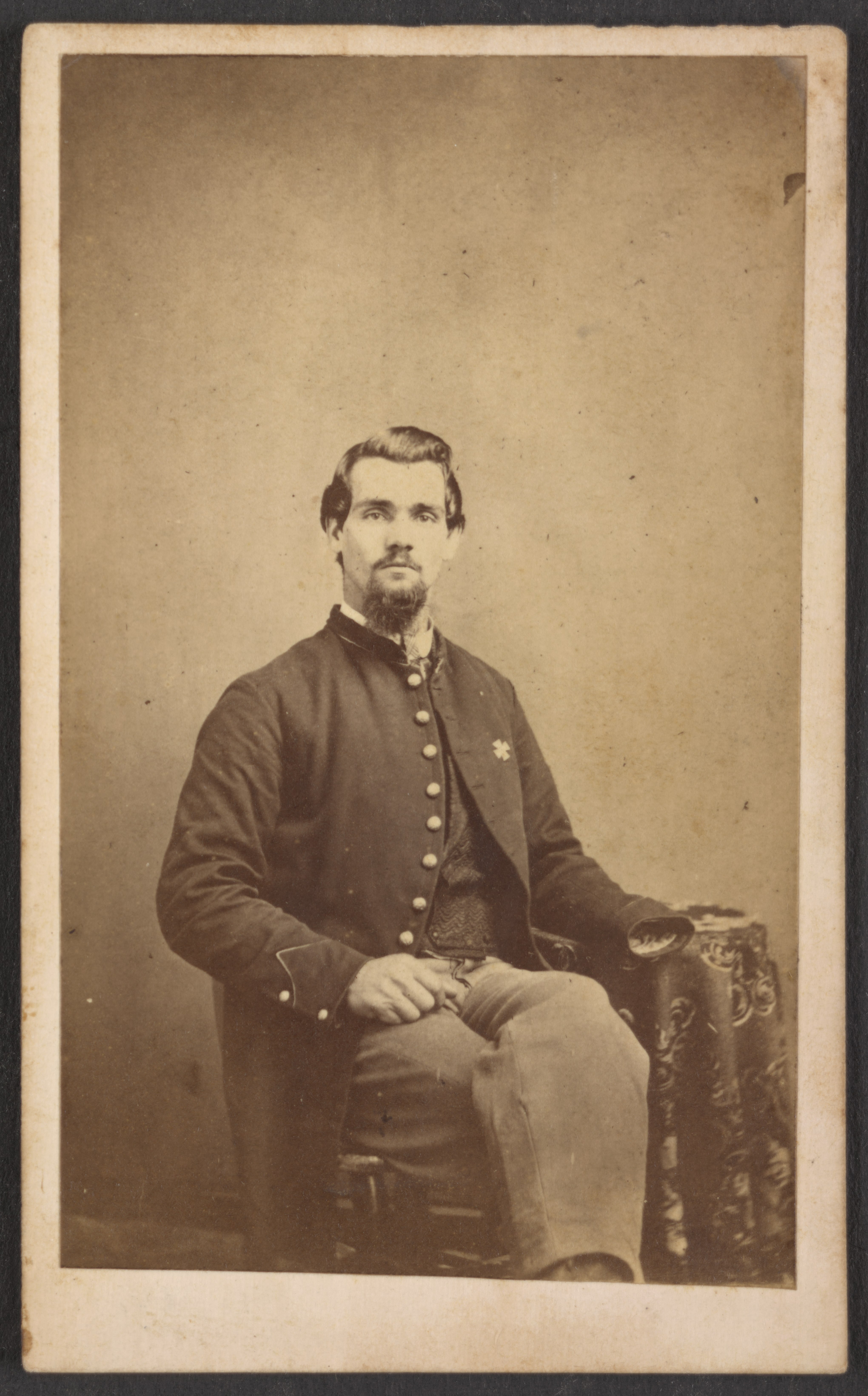
Private Vernon Mosher of Co. F, 97th New York Infantry Regiment, in uniform, amputated hand visible

The 97th New York Infantry Regiment ("Conkling Rifles") was an infantry regiment in the Union Army during the American Civil War.

== Service ==
The 97th New York Infantry was organized at Boonville, New York and mustered in for three years service on February 18, 1862, under the command of Colonel Charles Wheelock.

The regiment was attached to Wadsworth's Command, Military District of Washington, to May 1862. 2nd Brigade, 2nd Division, Department of the Rappahannock, to June 1862. 1st Brigade, 2nd Division, III Corps, Army of Virginia, to September 1862. 1st Brigade, 2nd Division, I Corps, Army of the Potomac, to December 1862. 3rd Brigade, 2nd Division, I Corps, to May 1863. 2nd Brigade, 2nd Division, I Corps, to March 1864. 2nd Brigade, 2nd Division, V Corps, to May 1864. 2nd Brigade, 3rd Division, V Corps, May 9–30, 1864. 2nd Brigade, 2nd Division, V Corps, to June 6, 1864. 2nd Brigade, 3rd Division, V Corps, to July, 1865.

The 97th New York Infantry mustered out of service on July 18, 1865.

== Detailed service ==
Left State for Washington, D.C., March 12, 1862. Duty in the defenses of Washington, D.C., until May 1862. Expedition to Front Royal, Va., to intercept Jackson, May 28-June 1. Picket duty on the Shenandoah River and at Front Royal to June 10. Duty at Catlett's Station, Warrenton and Waterloo, Va., until August. Battle of Cedar Mountain August 9. Pope's Campaign in northern Virginia August 16-September 2. Fords of the Rappahannock August 21–23. Thoroughfare Gap August 28. Battles of Groveton August 29; Bull Run August 30. Maryland Campaign September 6–22. Battles of South Mountain September 14; Antietam September 16–17. Duty near Sharpsburg, Md., until October 30. Movement to Falmouth, Va., October 30-November 19. At Brooks' Station until December 10. Battle of Fredericksburg, December 12–15. At Falmouth and Belle Plains until April 27, 1863. "Mud March" January 20–24. Chancellorsville Campaign April 27-May 6. Operations about Fitzhugh's Crossing April 29-May 2. Battle of Chancellorsville May 2–5. Gettysburg Campaign June 11-July 24. Battle of Gettysburg July 1–3. Pursuit of Lee to Manassas Gap, Va., July 5–24. Duty on line of the Rappahannock and Rapidan until October. Bristoe Campaign October 9–22. Advance to line of the Rappahannock November 7–8. Mine Run Campaign November 26-December 2. Demonstration on the Rapidan February 6–7, 1864. Campaign from the Rapidan to the James May 3-June 15. Battles of the Wilderness May 5–7; Laurel Hill May 8; Spotsylvania May 8–12; Spotsylvania Court House May 12–21. Assault on the Salient May 12. North Anna River May 23–26. Jericho Ford May 23. On line of the Pamunkey May 26–28. Totopotomoy May 28–31. Cold Harbor June 1–12. Bethesda Church June 1–3. White Oak Swamp June 13. Before Petersburg June 16–18. Siege of Petersburg June 16, 1864 to April 2, 1865. Mine Explosion, Petersburg, July 30, 1864 (reserve). Weldon Railroad August 18–21. Reconnaissance toward Dinwiddie Court House September 15. Warren's Raid on Weldon Railroad December 7–12. Sussex Court House December 10, Dabney's Mills, Hatcher's Run, February 5–7, 1865. Appomattox Campaign March 28-April 9. Lewis Farm, near Gravelly Run, March 29. White Oak Road March 31. Five Forks April 1. Fall of Petersburg April 2. Pursuit of Lee April 3–9. Appomattox Court House April 9. Surrender of Lee and his army. Moved to Washington, D.C., May 1–12. Grand Review of the Armies May 23. Duty at Washington until July.

== Casualties ==
The regiment lost a total of 338 men during service; 12 officers and 169 enlisted men killed or mortally wounded, 1 officer and 156 enlisted men died of disease.

== Commanders ==
- Colonel Charles Wheelock
- Colonel John Pembroke Spofford
- Lieutenant Colonel Rouse S. Egelston - commanded at the Third Battle of Petersburg where he was wounded in action
- Major Charles B. Northrup - commanded at the Battle of Gettysburg after Col. Wheelock was wounded and captured on July 1
- Captain Delos E. Hall - commanded at the Battle of Globe Tavern after Col. Wheelock was promoted to brigade command

== Notable members ==
- Sergeant Thomas Burk, Company H - Medal of Honor recipient for action at the Battle of the Wilderness

== See also ==
- List of New York Civil War regiments
- New York in the Civil War
