= Thomas Burk =

Medal of Honor recipient (1840–1926)

- Born: August 7, 1840; Lewis County, New York
- Died: March 15, 1926 (aged 85); Lewis County, New York
- Burial place: Lowville Rural Cemetery, Lowville, New York
- Military career
- Allegiance: United States of America
- Branch: United States Army; Union Army
- Rank: Sergeant
- Unit: (New York (state)) 97th Regiment New York Volunteer Infantry - Company H
- Conflicts: Battle of the Wilderness
- Awards: Medal of Honor

Sergeant Thomas Burk (August 7, 1840 – February 15, 1926) was an American soldier who fought in the American Civil War. Burk received the country's highest award for bravery during combat, the Medal of Honor, for his action during the Battle of the Wilderness on 6 May 1864. He was honored with the award on 24 August 1896.

== Biography ==
Burk was born in Lewis County, New York, on August 7, 1840. He enlisted in the 97th New York Volunteer Infantry. He died on February 15, 1926, and his remains are interred at the Lowville Rural Cemetery in New York.

== Medal of Honor citation ==
At the risk of his own life went back while the rebels were still firing and, finding Col. Wheelock unable to move, alone and unaided, carried him off the field of battle.

== See also ==
- List of American Civil War Medal of Honor recipients: A–F
