= Simon Goodell Griffin =

United States Army general

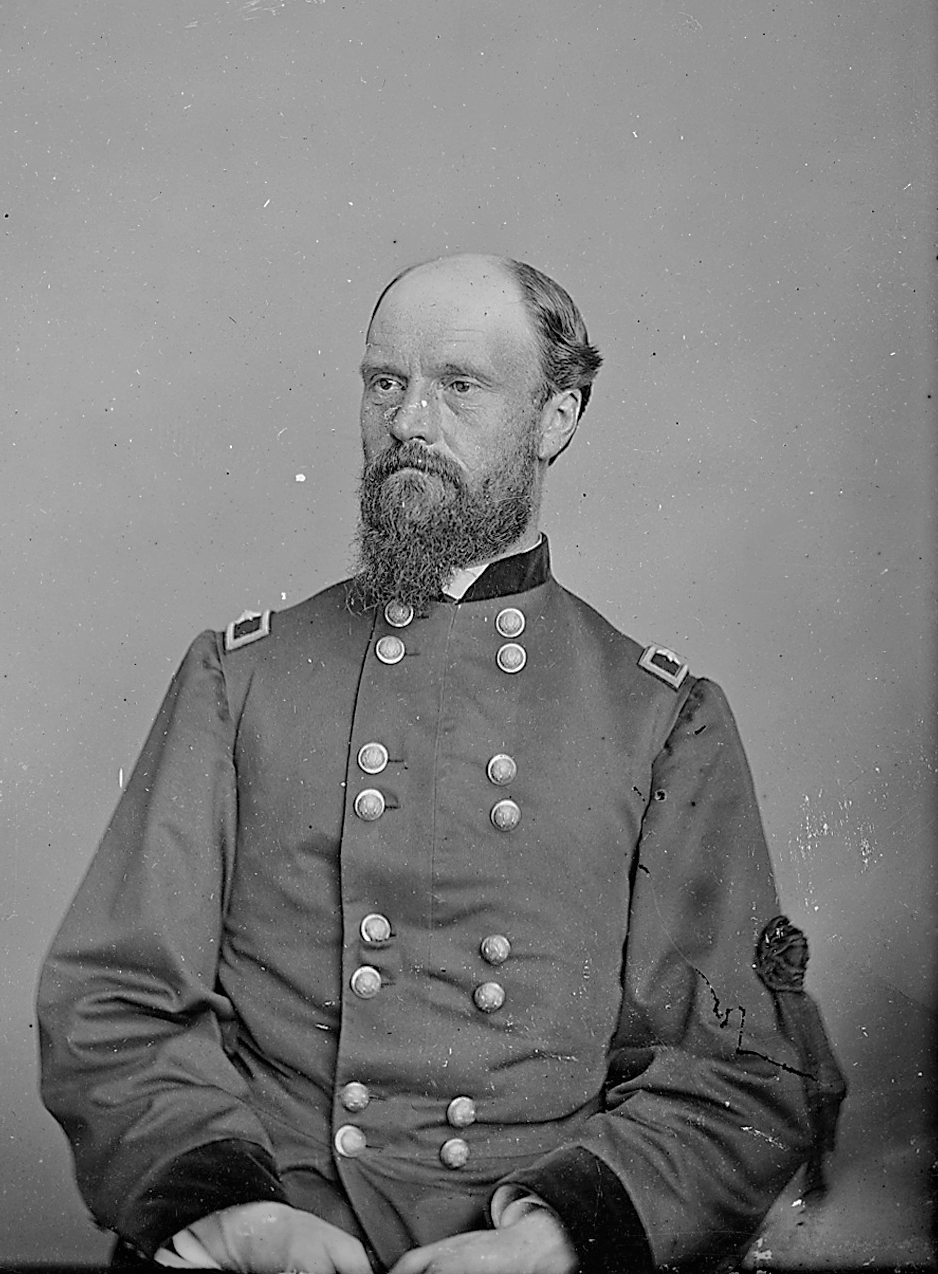
- Brig. Gen. Simon Goodell Griffin
- Born: August 9, 1824; Nelson, New Hampshire
- Died: January 14, 1902 (aged 77); Keene, New Hampshire
- Burial place: Woodland Cemetery, Keene, New Hampshire
- Military career
- Allegiance: United States of America; Union
- Branch: United States Army; Union Army
- Service years: 1861–1865
- Rank: Brigadier General
- Conflicts: American Civil War: Second Battle of Bull Run; Battle of Antietam; Battle of Fredericksburg; Siege of Vicksburg; Battle of the Wilderness; Battle of Spotsylvania Court House; Battle of Cold Harbor; Appomattox Campaign

Simon Goodell Griffin (August 9, 1824 – January 14, 1902) was a Union Army brigadier general during the American Civil War, farmer, teacher, lawyer and New Hampshire state legislator.

== Pre-War ==
Simon G. Griffin was born at Nelson, New Hampshire on August 9, 1824. Both of his grandfathers were American Revolutionary War veterans. Griffin was a farmer and a teacher. He represented his town in the State legislature and was admitted to the bar in 1860.

== Civil War Service ==
During the American Civil War, Griffin served first as a captain in the 2nd New Hampshire Infantry from June 1, 1861, to October 31 of that year. He served as lieutenant colonel of the 6th New Hampshire Infantry from November 28, 1861, until he became colonel on April 22, 1862. Griffin led his regiment in First Brigade, Second Division, Ninth Army Corps. He led the regiment in the Second Battle of Bull Run, the Battle of Antietam and the Battle of Fredericksburg. Griffin led first brigade second division briefly during the winter of 1862–1863.

Griffin's regiment was sent west with Major General Ambrose Burnside, where Griffin alternately served as regimental and brigade commander. He served under Major General Ulysses S. Grant during the Siege of Vicksburg when Major General John G. Parke took IX Corps to Mississippi. IX Corps served for the most time during the Vicksburg campaign with Major General William T. Sherman, preventing Confederate reinforcements from reaching Vicksburg. Next Colonel Griffin participated in Sherman's Meridian and Yazoo River Expeditions in Mississippi in February 1864, which culminated in the Battle of Meridian.

Returning east, Griffin commanded the Second Brigade, Second Division, in the Battle of the Wilderness, Battle of Spotsylvania Court House and the Battle of Cold Harbor. He was appointed brigadier general of volunteers on May 30, 1864, to rank from May 12, 1864.

When Major General Robert B. Potter, the division commander, was wounded in an attack on Fort Mahone during the Third Battle of Petersburg on April 2, 1865, Griffin became acting division commander during the Appomattox Campaign. He also commanded the division in the Department of Washington after the Confederate surrender.

== Post war ==
General Griffin was mustered out of the volunteer service on August 24, 1865. For gallantry at the Siege of Petersburg, on January 13, 1866, President Andrew Johnson nominated Griffin for the grade of brevet major general of volunteers, to rank from April 2, 1865, and the United States Senate confirmed the appointment on March 12, 1866.

After the war, Griffin returned to New Hampshire and was a manufacturer at Harrisville, New Hampshire. He was elected five times to a seat in the New Hampshire Legislature, serving in the last two terms as Speaker. He spent several years in Texas where he speculated in land and railroads. He returned to Keene, New Hampshire where he wrote and participated in the Military Order of the Loyal Legion of the United States. Griffin died in Keene, New Hampshire on January 14, 1902. He was buried in Keene at the Woodland Cemetery.

General Griffin also was a local historian, co-author of:

Simon Goodell Griffin, Frank H Whitcomb and Octavius Applegate Jr., A history of the town of Keene from 1732, when the township was granted by Massachusetts, to 1874, when it became a city, Keene, N.H., Sentinel Print. Co., 1904. Reprint: Bowie, MD: Heritage Books, 1980. ISBN 0-917890-21-3, ISBN 978-0-917890-21-5

Simon Goodell Griffin and Ebenezer Tolman, Celebration by the town of Nelson, New Hampshire (originally called "Monadnick no. 6" and incorporated as "Packersfield") of the one hundred and fiftieth anniversary of its first settlement, 1767-1917, New York: Evening post job Print. Office, Inc., 1917. Reprint: Salem, Mass.: Higginson Book Company, 1998.
