= Abraham Cohn =

American Civil War soldier

- Born: June 17, 1832; Guttentag, Prussia (now Poland)
- Died: June 2, 1897 (aged 64); New York City, US
- Military career
- Allegiance: United States
- Branch: United States Army; Union Army
- Service years: 1861 - 1862, 1864 - 1865
- Rank: Captain
- Unit: 6th Regiment, New Hampshire Volunteer Infantry
- Conflicts: American Civil War
- Awards: Medal of Honor

Abraham Cohn (June 17, 1832, in Guttentag, Prussia; died June 2, 1897, in New York City) was an American Civil War Union Army soldier and recipient to the highest military decoration for valor in combat — the Medal of Honor — for having distinguished himself at the Battle of the Wilderness on May 6, 1864, and the Battle of the Crater on July 30, 1864.

Cohn originally enlisted with the 68th New York Infantry Regiment in October 1861, and rose to the rank of Captain before being discharged in December 1862. He re-enlisted with the 6th New Hampshire Infantry Regiment in January 1864, and was mustered out in July 1865.

== Medal of Honor citation ==
- Rank and organization: Sergeant Major, 6th New Hampshire Infantry
- Place and date: At Wilderness, Virginia, May 6, 1864; At the mine, Petersburg, Virginia, July 30, 1864
- Entered service at: Campton, New Hampshire
- Birth: Guttentag, Prussia
- Date of issue: August 24, 1865

Citation:

During Battle of the Wilderness rallied and formed, under heavy fire, disorganized and fleeing troops of different regiments. At Petersburg, Va., July 30, 1864, bravely and coolly carried orders to the advanced line under severe fire.

== See also ==
- List of Jewish Medal of Honor recipients
- List of American Civil War Medal of Honor recipients: A–F
