= 6th New Hampshire Infantry Regiment =

- Active: November 27, 1861, to July 17, 1865
- Country: United States
- Allegiance: Union
- Branch: Infantry
- Size: 1,030 (Original Enlistment) 2,574 (Including Recruits)
- Engagements: Battle of Groveton; Second Battle of Bull Run; Battle of Chantilly; Maryland Campaign; Battle of South Mountain; Battle of Antietam; Battle of Fredericksburg; Siege of Vicksburg; Battle of the Wilderness; Battle of Spotsylvania Court House; Battle of Totopotomoy Creek; Battle of Cold Harbor; Siege of Petersburg; Second Battle of Petersburg; Battle of the Crater; Battle of Hatcher's Run; Appomattox Campaign; Third Battle of Petersburg

Commanders
- Notable commanders: Colonel Simon Goodell Griffin

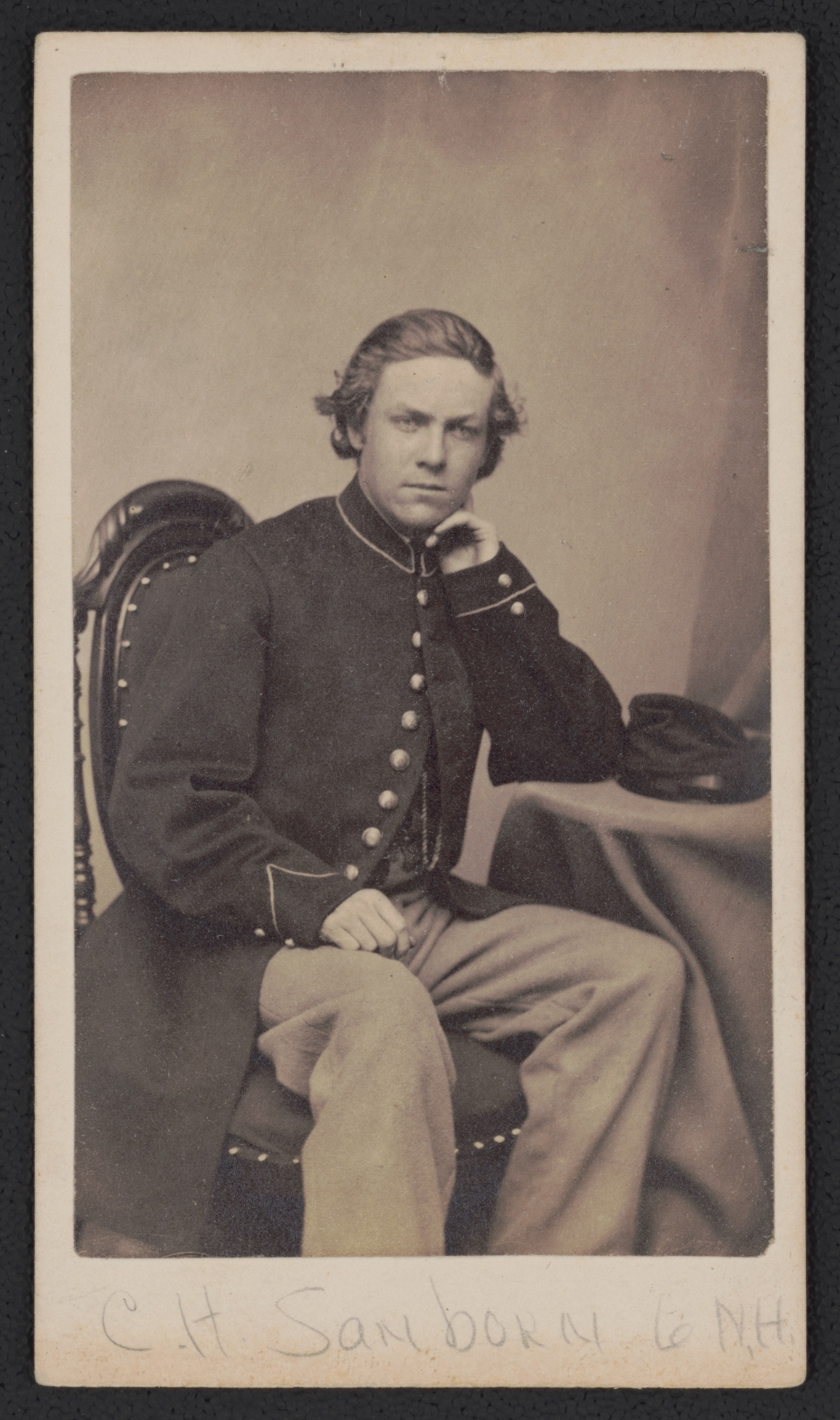
Private Charles H. Sanborn of Co. A, 6th New Hampshire Infantry Regiment. From the Liljenquist Family Collection of Civil War Photographs, Prints and Photographs Division, Library of Congress

The 6th New Hampshire Infantry Regiment was an infantry regiment that served in the Union Army during the American Civil War.

== Service ==
The 6th New Hampshire Infantry was organized in Keene, New Hampshire, and mustered in for a three-year enlistment on November 27, 1861.

The regiment was attached to Williams' 4th Brigade, North Carolina Expedition, to April 1862. Hawkins' Brigade, Department of North Carolina, to July 1862. 1st Brigade, 2nd Division, IX Corps, Army of the Potomac, to March 1863. 1st Brigade, 2nd Division, IX Corps, Department of the Ohio, to June 1863. 1st Brigade, 2nd Division, IX Corps, Army of the Tennessee, to September 1863. Bixby's Brigade, District of North Central Kentucky, 1st Division, XXIII Corps, Department of the Ohio, to February 1864. 1st Brigade, 2nd Division, IX Corps, Army of the Potomac, to April 1864. 2nd Brigade, 2nd Division, IX Corps, Army of the Potomac, to July 1865.

The 6th New Hampshire Infantry mustered out of service July 27, 1865.

== Detailed service ==
Left New Hampshire for Washington, D.C., December 25, 1861. Expedition to Hatteras Inlet, N.C., January 6–13, 1862, and duty there until March 2. Moved to Roanoke Island March 2 and duty there until June 18. Expedition to Elizabeth City April 7–8. Battle of Camden, South Mills, April 19. Expedition to New Berne June 18-July 2. Moved to Newport News, Va., July 2–10, and duty there until August 2. Moved to Aquia Creek and Fredericksburg, Va., August 2–7. Pope's Campaign in northern Virginia August 16-September 2. Battles of Groveton August 29; Second Bull Run August 30; Chantilly September 1. Maryland Campaign September–October. Battle of South Mountain, Md., September 14. Battle of Antietam, September 16–17. Duty in Pleasant Valley, Md., until October 27. Movement to Falmouth, Va., October 27-November 19. Corbin's Cross Roads, near Amissville, November 10. Sulphur Springs November 14. Battle of Fredericksburg, Va., December 12–15. Burnside's Second Campaign, "Mud March", January 20–24, 1863. Moved to Newport News, Va., February 11; then to Lexington, Ky., March 26-April 1. To Winchester, then to Richmond, Ky., April 18. To Paint Lick Creek May 3, and to Lancaster May 10. Movement to Vicksburg, Miss., June 3–14, Siege of Vicksburg June 14-July 4. Advance on Jackson, Miss., July 4–10. Siege of Jackson July 10–17. At Milldale until August 5. Moved to Cincinnati, Ohio, August 5–20; then to Nicholasville, Ky. Provost duty at Nicholasville, Frankfort, and Russellville until October 25. Moved to Camp Nelson, Ky., and provost duty there until January 16, 1864. Regiment veterans January 1864, and on furlough January 16 to March 10, when ordered to Annapolis, Md. Non-veterans at Camp Nelson, Ky., until March. Campaign from the Rapidan to the James May 3-June 15. Battles of the Wilderness, Va., May 5–7; Spotsylvania May 8–12; Spotsylvania Court House May 12–21. Assault on the Salient at Spotsylvania Court House May 12. North Anna River May 23–26. On line of the Pamunkey May 26–28. Totopotomoy May 28–31. Cold Harbor June 1–12. Bethesda Church June 1–3. Before Petersburg June 16–19. Siege of Petersburg June 16, 1864, to April 2, 1865. Mine Explosion, Petersburg, July 30, 1864. Weldon Railroad August 18–21. Poplar Springs Church September 29-October 2. Hatcher's Run October 27–28. Garrison of Fort Alexander Hays until April 1865. Appomattox Campaign March 28-April 9. Assaults on and fall of Petersburg April 2. Occupation of Petersburg April 3. Pursuit of Lee to Burkesville April 3–9. Moved to Washington, D.C., April 20–27. Duty at Alexandria until July. Grand Review of the Armies May 23.

== Casualties ==
The regiment lost a total of 418 men during service; 10 officers and 177 enlisted men killed or mortally wounded, 3 officers and 228 enlisted men died of disease.

== Commanders ==
- Colonel Simon Goodell Griffin
- Lieutenant Colonel Henry H. Pearson

== Notable members ==
- Sergeant Major Abraham Cohn - Medal of Honor recipient for action at the battle of the Wilderness, May 6, 1864, and at the battle of the Crater, July 30, 1864
- Corporal Osgood T. Hadley - Medal of Honor recipient for action saving the colors at Pegram House 30 September 1864.
- Alonzo Nute served as Quarter-Master in the 6th Regiment, New Hampshire Volunteer Infantry. After the war he was a member of the New Hampshire House of Representatives in 1866; became a member in the New Hampshire Senate (1867–68); and served as a delegate to the 1876 Republican National Convention. In 1889, he was elected to the Fifty-first Congress, serving until 1891. Not a candidate for re-nomination, he died a year later at age 66 in Farmington, New Hampshire.

== See also ==
- List of New Hampshire Civil War units
- New Hampshire in the American Civil War
