= 141st Pennsylvania Infantry Regiment =

Union Army volunteer infantry regiment

141st Regiment Pennsylvania Volunteer Infantry
- Active: August 20, 1862 to May 28, 1865
- Country: United States of America
- Allegiance: Union
- Branch: Infantry
- Engagements: Battle of Fredericksburg; Battle of Chancellorsville; Battle of Gettysburg; Battle of Auburn Mill; Battle of the Wilderness; Battle of Spotsylvania; Second Battle of Petersburg; First Battle of Deep Bottom; Battle of Sailor's Creek

Commanders
- Colonel of the Regiment: Henry John Madill

The 141st Regiment Pennsylvania Volunteer Infantry was a volunteer infantry regiment that fought in the Union Army during the American Civil War. The regiment served in the Army of the Potomac in the Eastern Theater and was heavily engaged in the second day of fighting at the Peach Orchard outside of Gettysburg.

== History ==
The regiment was organized in August 1862, with Henry J. Madill as colonel, Guy H. Watkins as lieutenant colonel, and Israel P. Spalding as major. It was known as the "Bradford Regiment" because most of the men were recruited from that county. It was sent to Harrisburg, Pennsylvania, where it was organized at Camp Curtin. After a couple of weeks, it was sent to picket the Potomac River in the area of Poolesville, Maryland.

The regiment became part of the 1st Brigade of the 1st Division of the III Corps. At the Battle of Fredericksburg, the regiment formed part of the force which engaged the Confederate right flank but lost few men. After the battle, the regiment went into winter quarters, but in the spring of 1863 was heavily engaged at the Battle of Chancellorsville, May 1–3, 1863, suffering over 50% casualties.

At the Battle of Gettysburg on July 2, 1863, the unit was detached from the rest of the brigade and sent to the southern part of the Peach Orchard. There, the 141st helped repel the attack of Brigadier General Joseph B. Kershaw's South Carolina Brigade. However, shortly after this the Peach Orchard salient began to collapse. Separated from the rest of its brigade, the regiment never received orders to withdraw and stayed in line of battle near the Peach Orchard. Possibly because of the thick battle smoke, the regiment did not fire on the approaching brigade of Brigadier General William Barksdale. The 141st suffered a devastating volley at close range from one of Barksdale's Mississippi regiments, and after a brief resistance withdrew towards Cemetery Ridge with a loss of almost 70% of its members. Of 209 men present for roll-call earlier in the day, 149 were killed, wounded, or missing in action.

Following the Gettysburg Campaign, the regiment fought in the Bristoe Station Campaign, seeing action at the Battle of Auburn Bridge, one of the final actions fought by the III Corps before its incorporation into the II Corps. The regiment received many replacements over the winter.

In 1864, the regiment fought in the Battle of the Wilderness (May 6–7, 1864), the Battle of Spotsylvania (May 11–12, 1864), and at the Second Battle of Petersburg (June 18, 1864). The regiment then took part in the Siege of Petersburg.

The 141st participated in the final campaign of the Army of the Potomac and fought at the Battle of Sayler's Creek on March 25, 1865, and again at the Battle of Farmville (April 6–7, 1865). The 141st was present at the surrender of the Army of Northern Virginia at Appomattox Court House. The regiment participated in the Grand Review of the Armies in Washington and was mustered out on May 29, 1865.

== Casualties ==
- Total enrollment: 1036
- Killed and died of wounds: 156 men
- Wounded: 404 men
- Captured and missing: 75 men
- Total loss: 635.

The casualty information presented above is derived from the History of the One Hundred Forty-First Regiment Pennsylvania Volunteers compiled by David Craft, the regimental Chaplain, after the war.
