= Battle of Boydton Plank Road =

1865 Battle of the American Civil War

Coordinates: 37.1431°N 77.5116°W

- Part of the American Civil War
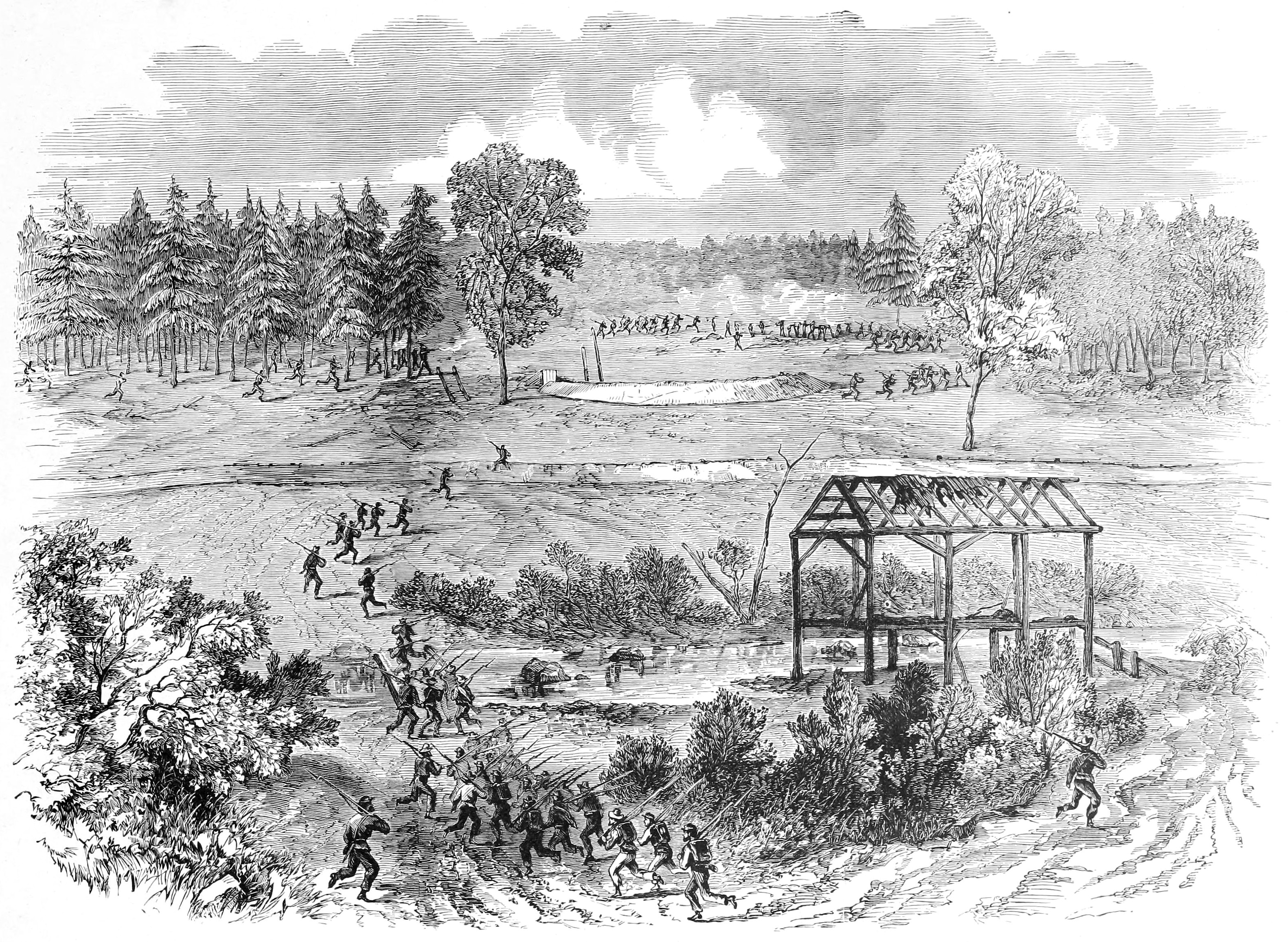
- Second Corps US Army under Hancock outflanking Confederate works at Armstrong's Mill, October 27
Date	October 27–28, 1864
Location	Dinwiddie County, near Petersburg, Virginia
Result	Union Victory

Belligerents
United States (Union)	CSA (Confederacy)

Commanders and leaders
Ulysses S. Grant; George Meade; Winfield S. Hancock	Henry Heth

Units involved
II Corps; V Corps; IX Corps	Third Corps

Strength
30,000	11,691

Casualties and losses
1,758	1,300

The Battle of Boydton Plank Road (also known as Burgess Mill or First Hatcher's Run), fought on October 27–28, 1864, followed the Union Army's successful Battle of Peebles's Farm in the siege of Petersburg during the American Civil War. This follow up was a further success, with the Union Army able to seize the Boydton and Petersburg Plank Road and temporarily cut the South Side Railroad, a critical supply line to Petersburg, Virginia.

== Background ==
At the Battle of Peebles's Farm earlier in October, the Union V Corps had seized a portion of the Confederate works around Hatcher's Run. The entire II Corps, under Maj. Gen. Winfield S. Hancock, was pulled out of the trenches and moved to operate against the Confederates' Boydton Line in conjunction with a simultaneous operation against the Richmond defenses along the Darbytown Road. The II Corps was reinforced by divisions from the V Corps, IX Corps, and Brig. Gen. David McM. Gregg's cavalry division already operating in the area.

== Battle ==
On October 27, Hancock marched across Hatcher's Run, brushed aside Confederate pickets and moved around the Confederate flank towards Burgess Mill. The division under Brig. Gen. Gershom Mott crossed the Boydton Plank Road and attacked Maj. Gen. Wade Hampton's Confederate cavalry threatening to cut it off from the main Confederate lines. Lt. Gen. A. P. Hill, who commanded the Confederate defenses in the area, reacted quickly to Hancock's threat. However, once his units moved to confront the Federals, Hill, in poor health, proved too sick to continue field command and turned over direction of his corps to Maj. Gen. Henry Heth. Heth put two divisions in Hancock's path, but the Federal commander drove up the Boydton Plank Road and pushed aside the opposing Confederates. At this time both Maj. Gen. George G. Meade and Lt. Gen. Ulysses S. Grant rode out to the battlefield, where Meade immediately noticed a gap between Hancock and the V Corps. With the South Side Railroad still 6 miles (9.7 km) away, Meade realized that continuing the advance would only further isolate the II Corps, and so ordered Hancock to halt. Brig. Gen. Samuel W. Crawford's V Corps division was ordered to link with the II Corps but became caught up in the dense woods. General Grant, meanwhile, made a personal reconnaissance of the Confederate works and, after coming under fire, determined that the Confederates were too strong and called off the offensive.

Having never linked up with Crawford's division, Hancock's corps returned to Hatcher's Run crossing but found it blocked by Confederate cavalry. This left the entire II Corps isolated on the north side of Hatcher's Run without support. With the memory of Reams's Station infusing them, Heth and Hampton saw a golden opportunity to destroy the whole II Corps. Hancock's only line of retreat was the Dabney Mill Road, for which Heth was now aiming. Late in the afternoon, Brig. Gen. William Mahone's division attacked through the same woods that had stopped Crawford and seized the Dabney Mill Road, while a Confederate cavalry division under Maj. Gen. W.H.F. "Rooney" Lee moved up behind the Federals. Mahone moved so far around the Federal flank that Brig. Gen. Thomas W. Egan's II Corps division was forced to completely change fronts. Hancock was now surrounded on 3 sides with no line of retreat. But unlike at Reams's Station, the II Corps did not panic, and Hancock seized the initiative. Mahone had almost been too successful and found his division isolated in turn. Hancock ordered an attack on both Confederate flanks. Hampton failed to hold off the Union cavalry and Gregg was able to move up and aid in routing Mahone. The tables had thus turned and the Confederates, now threatened with encirclement, retreated up the Boydton Plank Road. Hancock retained his hold on the Boydton Plank Road and Grant left to him the decision whether to remain or withdraw to the initial Union lines. Although Hancock had repulsed the Confederate attack, his position was still very unstable. That night Hancock marched his men back to their original position.

== Aftermath ==
With October nearly over, both armies settled into winter quarters. The Confederates maintained their hold on the Boydton Plank Road throughout the winter. Hancock had won a tactical victory over Heth's Confederates, partially erasing the stain of the rout at Reams's Station. No further significant action occurred on any front around Petersburg for the rest of the year.

The Battle of Boydton Plank Road marked the last battle of two distinguished Union generals in the Army of the Potomac. The following month, Winfield Hancock resigned from field command due to complications with the wound he received at Gettysburg. Then in January 1865, David McM. Gregg unexpectedly resigned his command. His letter of resignation alluded to an anxiety of being away from his home. Meade's chief-of-staff, Maj. Gen. Andrew A. Humphreys, assumed command of the II Corps and would resume the offensive against the Boydton Plank Road in February of the following year.
