= 83rd Pennsylvania Infantry Regiment =

Union Army volunteer infantry regiment

83rd Pennsylvania Volunteer Infantry Regiment
- Pennsylvania flag
- Active: September 8, 1861–June 1865
- Country: United States
- Allegiance: Union
- Branch: Infantry
- Size: 1,808
- Part of: 3rd Brigade, 1st Division V Corps, Army of the Potomac
- Nickname: Pennsylvania Mud turtles
- Engagements: Yorktown; Seven Days Battles; Second Battle of Bull Run; Battle of Antietam; Battle of Fredericksburg; Chancellorsville; Gettysburg; Mine Run Campaign; Wilderness; Spotsylvania; Cold Harbor; Siege of Petersburg; Appomattox Campaign; Battle of Five Forks

Commanders
- Notable commanders: Col. John W. McLane; Col. Strong Vincent; Col. Orpheus S. Woodward

The 83rd Pennsylvania Infantry Regiment also nicknamed the "Pennsylvania Mud Turtles" was a volunteer infantry regiment in the Union Army during the American Civil War, first organized at Erie in September, 1861. The 83rd participated in almost every major battle in the East, including Seven Days Battles, Antietam, Fredericksburg, Gettysburg, Petersburg and Appomattox Court House.

== Organization ==
The Erie Regiment, commanded by Col. John W. McLane, serving for three months' service, was just disbanded when the news of the defeat of the First Battle of Bull Run, had spread across the nation. triggering a sense of shock, due to the unexpected defeat when they widely anticipated a quick and easy victory.

On July 24, 1861, McLane was given authority to raise a three years' service from the Secretary of War, Simon Cameron, when recruitment began, over 1,000 joined the regiment in less than a week, including 300 who previously served in the Erie Regiment. The regiment was organized in Erie and subsequently mustered into service on September 8, 1861.

The companies of this regiment was mainly recruited from the counties of Erie, Crawford, Warren, Venago and Mercer. The men rendezvoused at Camp McLane, near the city of Erie, where it was mustered into service on September 8, 1861.

== Service ==
=== Early service ===
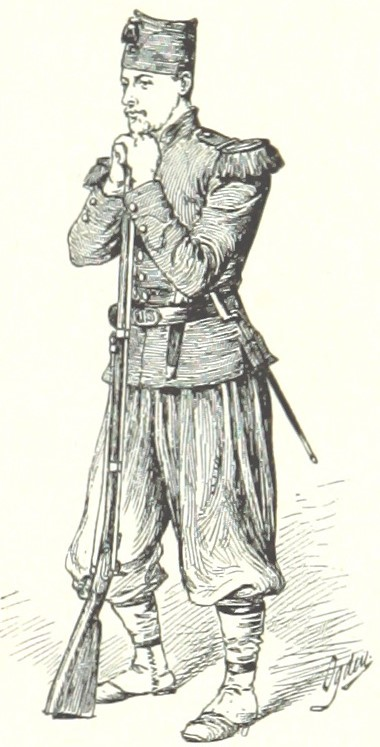
The uniform of the 83rd Pennsylvania

After they were mustered, the 1,000 strong regiment left the state and moved to Washington D.C, receiving their uniforms and armaments, which were Harper's Ferry muskets. During this period, it was attached to the 3rd Brigade (Commanded by Brig. Gen. Daniel Butterfield), Porter's Division of the Army of the Potomac, which was holding a line from the Chain Bridge, to Alexandria, where the regiment was at. Once it was assigned to the Army of the Potomac, they were drilled and trained in Alexandria. Where it became noted for its excellency in training and appearance, to the point, when McClellan said to Colonel McLane: "Colonel, I congratulate you on having one of the very best regiments in the army!" and in a subsequent order by Butterfield, said " The General commanding feels called upon to congratulate and commend the Eighty-third, for the very general spirit of attention to duty that seems to pervade the regiment. Its attention to drill is especially recommended as a worthy example to the rest of the brigade." For their proficiency in drill, they were given French Chasseur de Vincennes uniforms.

Once given these uniforms, the regiment was encamped on the right of the 44th New York, and the members of these two regiments grew a strong friendship between one another, and on New Year's Eve in 1862, both regiments celebrated the New Year together.

=== McClellan's Peninsula Campaign ===
On the morning of March 9, the regiment was ordered to move, alongside the Army of the Potomac, which was stationed in Washington for six months. During this period, their baggage, which included their French uniforms, was sent away and subsequently stored in the warehouses at Georgetown. The regiment marched to Fairfax Court House at evening, and was subsequently transferred to the Peninsula, arriving at Hampton, where its first assignment was to scout Big Bethel, once at Big Bethel, the regiment reported that the Confederate works were found to be abandoned, but their outposts still remaining to be occupied.

==== Siege of Yorktown ====
April 4, the regiment took part in the Siege of Yorktown, where the regiment participated in siege operations, building rifle pits, and later widening and deepening it, allowing artillery batteries to position themselves there, on May 3, just when the earthworks were finished, and the batteries ready to assist in the assault upon Yorktown, the Confederates retreated under the cover of heavy artillery fire.

During the Siege, the regiment lost 8 men wounded.

==== Battle of Hanover Court House ====
After the siege, the regiment moved to Hanover Court House, via transports on the York River, in the subsequent Battle of Hanover Court House, the regiment advanced under heavy artillery fire, along the way throwing their blankets and knapsacks aside, and drove the Confederates, leading to the Confederates abandoning an artillery piece, which was later captured by the 17th New York. The confederates attempted to make a stand on Ashland road, but the 83rd rapidly advanced against them, engaging with the Confederates for half an hour until they retreated.

During this engagement, the regiment lost 8 men wounded.

=== Seven Days Battles ===
By the end of May, McClellan's army was outside of Richmond, with the positions of the army stretching from White Oak Swamp to Porter's Corps, 27,000 strong, at White House Plantation. During this period, Robert E. Lee took command of the Army of Northern Virginia once Joseph E. Johnston, was wounded at the Battle of Seven Pines. Once reinforced by Stonewall Jackson's army, attacked Porter's Corps, which had already set up defensive positions, with 60,000 men on June 27.

=== Battle of Gaines' Mill ===
During the battle, the regiment took position on the extreme left of the Union line, and while waiting for the Confederate attack, logs were hastily thrown up to act as breastworks, which likely rendered the position as impregnable. During the early day of June 27, Company A, under the command of Captain Sigler, who was deployed as skirmishers, was replaced by Company B, under Captain Morris, who was later severely wounded and taken to the rear. In the subsequent engagement, the Confederates drove the 83rd's skirmishers back when the 83rd opened a volley, with Union artillery batteries positioned in higher ground, subsequently firing, which stopped the Confederate advance for some time, before rallying to continue their attack. During the Confederate advance, the Confederate color bearers were repeatedly shot, leading other Confederate soldiers to continue carrying the colors, as the Confederates struggled to advance. The Confederates attacked the Union line twice but were driven out.

But on the right flank, the Confederates were more successful and began advancing in full force, using the forest to discreetly advance. Before the Union troops realized what had happened, the Confederates managed to move into the 3rd Brigade's side and rear of the 83rd Pennsylvania. The regiment quickly pivoted its line to a right angle, to confront the Confederate flanking maneuver, taking minimal casualties due to the breastworks thrown earlier in the battle, while the Confederates continued to take heavy losses.

During the engagement, Colonel McLane was killed by a Confederate bullet. Moments later, Major Nagel was mortally wounded by a fragment of a shell. With Lieutenant Colonel Vincent absent, who was sick at the time, Captain Campbell took command of the regiment, the regiment did not waver despite the heavy fire they were receiving, and drove the Confederates from their front.

=== Battle of Gettysburg ===
As one of four regiments in the 3rd Brigade, 1st Division, V Corps, Army of the Potomac, it fought alongside the 20th Maine, 44th New York, and the 16th Michigan in the defense of Little Round Top. Colonel Strong Vincent, the brigade's commanding officer (former regimental commanding officer), was mortally wounded during this engagement.

The 83rd Pennsylvania suffered the second-highest number of battle deaths among Union Army infantry regiments during the war, second only to the 5th New Hampshire.

Future Medal of Honor recipient Leander Herron served in the 83rd Pennsylvania from December 1863 to June 1865.

== Casualties ==
During its time of service, the 83rd Pennsylvania lost 11 officers and 271 men killed in combat and 2 officers and 151 men died from disease or accidents. 435 men in total died during the regiment's time of service, amounting to 24% of its enlistments.

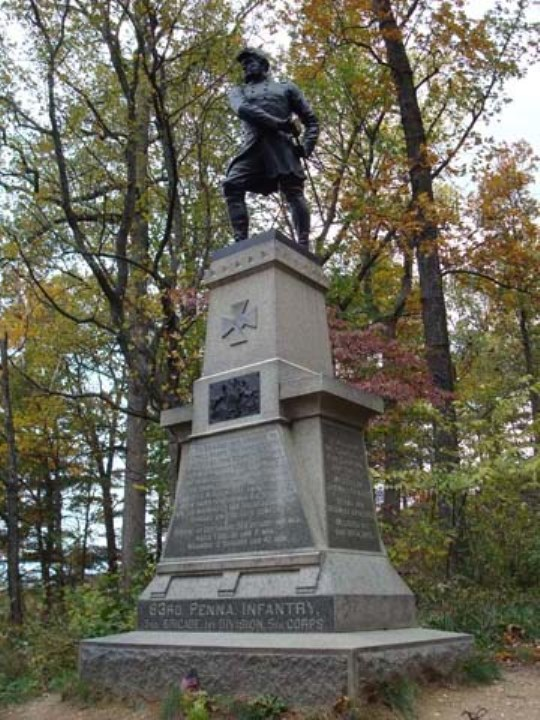
The 83rd Pennsylvania's monument on the slopes of Little Round Top at Gettysburg.

== Commanders ==
- Col. John W. Mclane

== See also ==
- List of Pennsylvania Civil War regiments
