= Brest =

Brest most commonly refers to:

- Brest, France
- Brest, Belarus

Brest may also refer to:

== Places ==
=== Historical places ===
- Beresteishchyna
- Brest Litovsk Voivodeship
- Brest ghetto

=== Belarus ===
- Brest Region
- Brest Airport
- Brest-Tsentralny railway station
- Brest Fortress
- Brest FEZ

=== North Macedonia ===
- Brest, Čučer-Sandevo, North Macedonia
- Brest, Makedonski Brod, North Macedonia
- Brest, Štip Municipality, North Macedonia

=== France ===
- Arrondissement of Brest
- Brest Bretagne Airport
- Château de Brest
- Brest Arena

=== Other countries ===
- Brest, Kyustendil Province, Bulgaria
- Brest, Croatia
- Břest, Czech Republic
- Brest, Germany
- Brześć Kujawski (Kuyavian Brest), Poland
  - Duchy of Brześć Kujawski (Duchy of Kuyavian Brest)
- Brest (Merošina), Serbia
- Brest, Ig, Slovenia
- Brest, Michigan, United States, a former community

== History ==
- Yaroslav the Wise's attack on Brest, 1022
- Union of Brest, 1595
- Treaty of Brest-Litovsk (Ukraine–Central Powers), 9 February 1918
- Treaty of Brest-Litovsk, 3 March 1918
- Brest elections, 1930
- Brest trials, 1931-1922
- Battle of Brest-Litovsk, September 1939
- Defense of Brest Fortress, 22–29 June 1941
- Lublin–Brest offensive, 1944

== Other uses ==
- Brest (surname), including a list of people with the name
- 3232 Brest, an asteroid
- Brest Bible, first complete Protestant Bible translation into Polish
- BREST (reactor), a Russian nuclear reactor
- Stade Brestois 29, a French football club, located in Brest.

== See also ==
- Breast (disambiguation)
- Brześć (disambiguation)
