= Battle of Peebles' Farm order of battle: Union =

The following Union Army units and commanders fought in the Battle of Peebles's Farm (Sept 30, 1864) during the Petersburg campaign of the American Civil War. The order of battle is compiled from the official tabulation of casualties and includes only units which sustained casualties. The Confederate Order of Battle is listed separately.

== Abbreviations used ==
=== Military rank ===
- MG = Major General
- BG = Brigadier General
- Col = Colonel
- Ltc = Lieutenant Colonel
- Maj = Major
- Cpt = Captain
- Lt = Lieutenant

=== Other ===
- w = wounded
- mw = mortally wounded
- k = killed
- c = captured

== Army of the Potomac ==
=== II Corps ===
Division	Brigade	Regiments and Others
First Division [not engaged]		
Second Division [not engaged]		
Third Division; MG Gershom Mott	First Brigade; K-4, W-15, M-1 = 20 BG Régis de Trobriand	20th Indiana; 1st Maine Heavy Artillery; 17th Maine; 40th New York; 73rd New York; 86th New York; 124th New York; 99th Pennsylvania; 110th Pennsylvania; 2nd U.S. Sharpshooters
Third Division; MG Gershom Mott	Second Brigade; K-4, W-39, M-11 = 54 BG Byron R. Pierce	1st Massachusetts Heavy Artillery; 5th Michigan; 93rd New York; 57th Pennsylvania; 84th Pennsylvania: Ltc George Zinn (w); 105th Pennsylvania; 141st Pennsylvania; 1st U.S. Sharpshooters (3 companies)
Third Division; MG Gershom Mott	Third Brigade; K-4, W-11, M-0 = 15 Col Robert McAllister	11th Massachusetts (7 companies): Maj Charles C. Rivers; 5th New Jersey (5 companies); 7th New Jersey (4 companies); 8th New Jersey (5 companies); 11th New Jersey; 72nd New York (1 company); 120th New York

=== V Corps ===
MG Gouverneur K. Warren

Division	Brigade	Regiments and Others
First Division; BG Charles Griffin	First Brigade Col Horatio G. Sickel	21st Pennsylvania Cavalry (dismounted); 198th Pennsylvania: Ltc John B. Murray
First Division; BG Charles Griffin	Second Brigade Col Edgar M. Gregory	32nd Massachusetts; 91st Pennsylvania; 155th Pennsylvania
First Division; BG Charles Griffin	Third Brigade Col James Gwyn (w)	20th Maine: Ltc Ellis Spear; 18th Massachusetts (2 companies): Cpt Luther S. Bent; 1st Michigan: Cpt James Wheaton (k), Cpt Cornelius B. van Valer; 16th Michigan: Col Norval E. Welch (k); 44th New York; 83rd Pennsylvania; 118th Pennsylvania: Cpt James B. Wilson
Second Division; BG Romeyn B. Ayres	First Brigade Ltc Elwell S. Otis (w); Maj James G. Grindlay	5th New York Veteran; 15th New York Heavy Artillery; 140th New York; 146th New York: Maj James G. Grindlay; 10th U.S.: Lt Theodore Schwan; 11th U.S.; 12th U.S.; 14th U.S. (8 companies): Cpt John McClintock; 17th U.S.
Second Division; BG Romeyn B. Ayres	Second Brigade Col Samuel A. Graham	1st Maryland; 4th Maryland; 7th Maryland; 8th Maryland; Purnell (Maryland) Legion
Second Division; BG Romeyn B. Ayres	Third Brigade Col Arthur H. Grimshaw	3rd Delaware; 4th Delaware; 157th Pennsylvania; 190th Pennsylvania; 191st Pennsylvania
Third Division	First Brigade [not engaged]	
Third Division	Second Brigade [not engaged]	
Third Division	Third Brigade Col J. William Hofmann	76th New York; 95th New York; 147th New York; 56th Pennsylvania; 121st Pennsylvania: Ltc James S. Warner (c); 142nd Pennsylvania
Artillery Division		1st New York Light Artillery, Battery B; 1st New York Light Artillery, Battery D; 1st New York Light Artillery, Battery H: Cpt Charles E. Mink

=== IX Corps ===
MG John G. Parke

Division	Brigade	Regiments and Others
First Division; BG Orlando B. Willcox	First Brigade Col Samuel Harriman	8th Michigan: Ltc Ralph Ely; 27th Michigan; 109th New York; 13th Ohio Cavalry (dismounted); 51st Pennsylvania; 37th Wisconsin; 38th Wisconsin
First Division; BG Orlando B. Willcox	Second Brigade BG John F. Hartranft	1st Michigan Sharpshooters: Col Charles V. DeLand (w&c), Cpt George H. Murdoch; 2nd Michigan; 20th Michigan: Ltc Byron M. Cutcheon; 24th New York Cavalry (dismounted); 46th New York; 60th Ohio; 50th Pennsylvania
First Division; BG Orlando B. Willcox	Third Brigade Col Napoleon B. McLaughlen	3rd Maryland (4 companies); 29th Massachusetts; 57th Massachusetts; 59th Massachusetts: Ltc Joseph Colburn; 14th New York Heavy Artillery; 100th Pennsylvania
Second Division; BG Robert B. Potter	First Brigade Col John I. Curtin	21st Massachusetts (3 companies): Cpt Orange S. Sampson; 35th Massachusetts: Maj John W. Hudson; 36th Massachusetts: Ltc William F. Draper; 58th Massachusetts; 51st New York: Maj John G. Wright (c); 45th Pennsylvania; 48th Pennsylvania: Ltc Henry Pleasants; 4th Rhode Island; 7th Rhode Island: Ltc Percy Daniels
Second Division; BG Robert B. Potter	Second Brigade BG Simon G. Griffin	31st Maine; 32nd Maine; 2nd Maryland; 56th Massachusetts; 6th New Hampshire; 9th New Hampshire; 11th New Hampshire; 2nd New York Mounted Rifles (dismounted); 179th New York; 17th Vermont
Second Division; BG Robert B. Potter	Artillery Brigade Ltc J. Albert Monroe	Maine Light Artillery, 7th Battery (G); Massachusetts Light Artillery, 11th Battery; New York Light Artillery, 19th Battery; New York Light Artillery, 34th Battery; Pennsylvania Light Artillery, Battery D

== Cavalry Corps ==
Division	Brigade	Regiments and Others
First Division [not engaged]		
Second Division; BG David McMurtrie Gregg	First Brigade BG Henry E. Davies, Jr.	1st Massachusetts Cavalry; 1st New Jersey Cavalry: Maj Myron H. Beaumont; 10th New York Cavalry; 6th Ohio Cavalry: Col William Stedman; 1st Pennsylvania Cavalry; 2nd U.S. Artillery, Battery A
Second Division; BG David McMurtrie Gregg	Second Brigade Col Charles H. Smith	1st Maine Cavalry; 2nd Pennsylvania Cavalry; 4th Pennsylvania Cavalry; 8th Pennsylvania Cavalry; 13th Pennsylvania Cavalry; 16th Pennsylvania Cavalry; 1st U.S. Artillery, Batteries H & I
