= Battle of Peebles' Farm order of battle =

The order of battle for the Battle of Peebles' Farm includes:

- Battle of Peebles' Farm order of battle: Confederate
- Battle of Peebles' Farm order of battle: Union
