= Norval E. Welch =

Union Army colonel

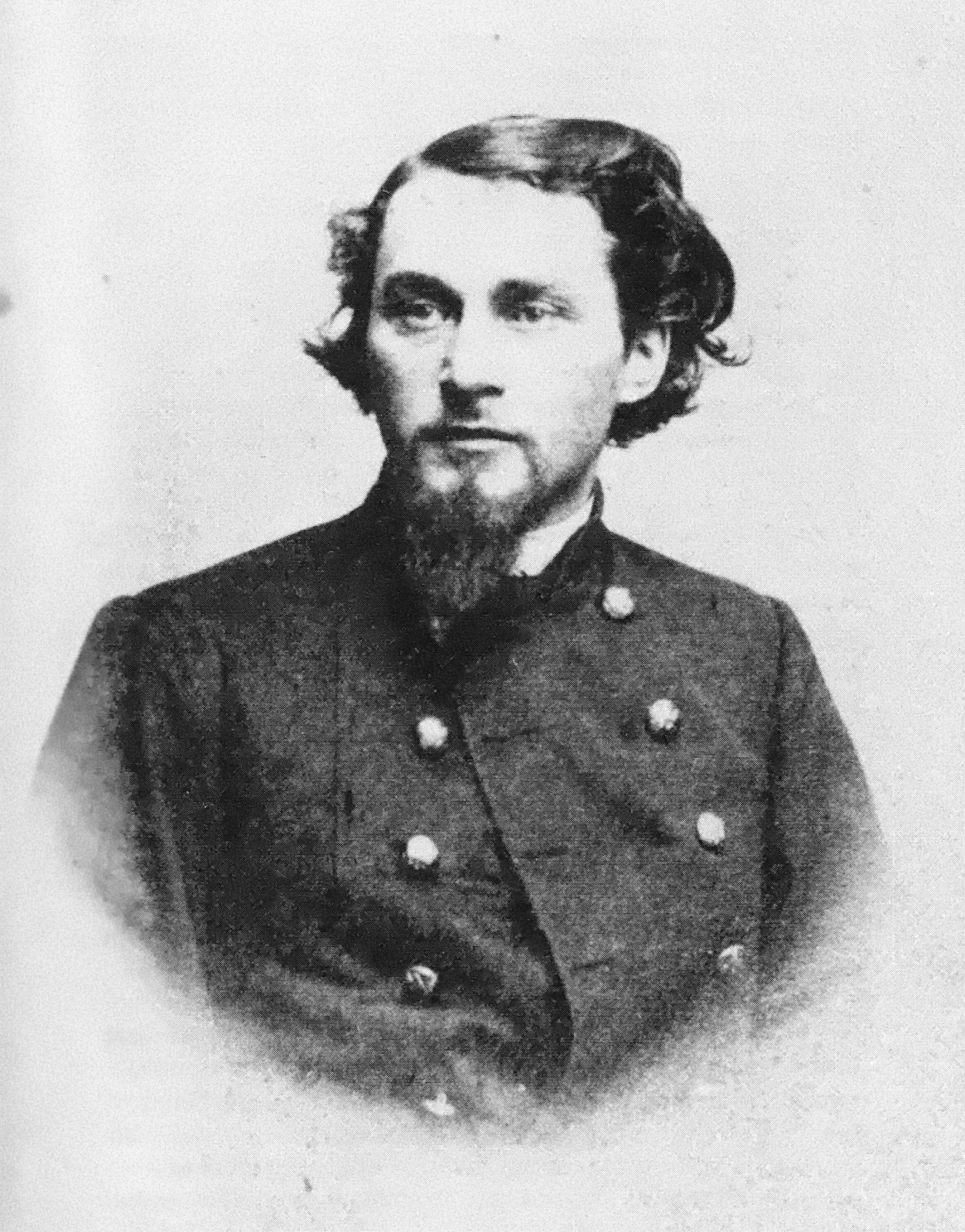
- Born: c. 1835; Pittsfield Township, Michigan, U.S.
- Died: September 30, 1864 (aged 28–29); Dinwiddie County, Virginia, U.S.
- Burial place: Forest Hill Cemetery
- Education: University of Michigan (LLB)
- Military career
- Allegiance: United States of America
- Branch: United States Army
- Service years: 1861–1864
- Rank: Colonel
- Commands: 16th Michigan Infantry Regiment
- Conflicts: American Civil War; Seven Days Battles; Battle of Gaines' Mill; Battle of Malvern Hill; Battle of Antietam; Battle of Fredericksburg; Battle of Chancellorsville; Battle of Gettysburg; Battle of Little Round Top; Siege of Petersburg; Battle of Peebles' Farm †

Norval E. Welch (c. 1835 – September 30, 1864) was an American soldier who served as the commander of the 16th Michigan Infantry Regiment of the United States Army during the American Civil War. He took considerable criticism after ordering a partial withdrawal of his regiment while fighting at Little Round Top at the Battle of Gettysburg, though his gallantry the Battle of Peebles' Farm in 1864, where he was killed, served to rehabilitate his reputation.

== Early life ==
Welch was born about 1835 in Pittsfield Township, Michigan, one of three children of Owen and Celia Welch. Owen was a farmer, originally from New York State, who had settled in Pittsfield Township in 1829. After Owen died in 1855, Norval became the provider for his mother and two sisters.

Welch began his career in Detroit as an aide to Senator Lewis Cass. While attending law school at the University of Michigan in Ann Arbor, Welch served as the first lieutenant of the Ann Arbor City Guard, a company of the state militia. He also worked in municipal government as the city recorder. After graduating with an LLB degree in Michigan's inaugural law class of 1860, Welch practiced law in Detroit.

== Civil War service ==
=== Early career ===
Welch was commissioned as a major in 16th Michigan Infantry Regiment on September 8, 1861, assisting in mustering the regiment in Detroit under the command of Colonel T.B.W. Stockton. The regiment's first major engagement was the Battle of Gaines' Mill on June 27, 1862, part of the Seven Days Battles, which resulted in Stockton's capture. Welch's conduct drew praise from Brigadier General Daniel Butterfield, commander of 16th's parent unit—the 3rd Brigade, First Division, V Corps, Army of the Potomac—saying Welch "rendered me invaluable assistance throughout the entire fight, exposing [himself] to danger by carrying orders and bringing information with unsurpassed coolness and bravery." Welch also fought with the 16th at the Battle of Malvern Hill four days later. The regiment's second-in-command, Lieutenant Colonel John Ruehle, resigned shortly after Malvern Hill, leaving Welch, quickly promoted to lieutenant colonel, temporarily in command of the regiment. Stockton returned in August after being freed in a prisoner exchange, but a personal rift between he and Welch opened: Stockton felt that Welch took undue credit for leadership at Gaines' Mill, that his promotion was distasteful opportunism, and that Welch was responsible for the loss of the regimental colors during the battle.

Welch returned to Michigan in August 1862 to recruit replacements for the regiment's losses, missing the 16th's engagement at the Second Battle of Bull Run. He had returned by the Battle of Antietam on September 17, 1862, where he once again commanded the 16th, while Stockton temporarily commanded the 3rd Brigade, substituting for Butterfield, who had taken ill. The regiment was held in reserve at the battle and saw no action, but suffered 42 casualties (including three dead) at the Battle of Fredericksburg in December.

The tension between Welch and Stockton culminated with Welch's court-martial on April 16, 1863 for seventeen varied infractions. Among them, Stockton alleged that Welch had withheld the pay of an insubordinate private when he had no authority to do so, and had ignored Stockton's order to reinstate that pay. Stockton also alleged that Welch had improperly altered an army receipt for a tent, fraternized with enlisted personnel, and most personal to Stockton, had libeled him by omission in not seeking to correct New York Herald and Detroit Free Press articles that credited Welch with leading the regiment at Gaines' Mill. Welch was defended by Colonel Strong Vincent of the 83rd Pennsylvania Infantry Regiment who, like Welch, was an attorney in civilian life. Vincent called no witnesses and made no closing statement, and Welch was acquitted of all charges. On May 22, Stockton resigned from both the 16th and his temporary command of the 3rd Brigade, officially to accept an offer from Vice President Andrew Johnson to raise three federal infantry regiments. Welch, now in permanent command of the 16th, led the regiment at the Battle of Chancellorsville in early May 1863, though it saw only a light engagement with very few casualties.

=== Gettysburg ===
At the Battle of Gettysburg on July 2, 1863, the 16th Michigan was one of four regiments of the 3rd Brigade (now under the command of Strong Vincent, who would be mortally wounded in the battle), which anchored the Union's left flank on Little Round Top, a rocky, wooded hill south of the town. Vincent placed the 20th Maine Infantry Regiment—the brigade's largest—on the extreme left, with the 83rd Pennsylvania, 44th New York, and 16th Michigan to its right. Welch's regiment was the brigade's smallest with about 200 men, and was left with only 150 after sending its two largest companies to reinforce the 20th Maine's left flank. Furthermore, the 16th's right flank was "open and exposed" as the steep hill in front of them leveled off on their right, making it an ideal point of attack for Confederate infantry. Facing intense fire from the 44th and 48th Alabama and the 4th and 5th Texas regiments, Welch, apparently believing the 16th would be imminently overrun, withdrew with 40 men and the regimental colors, weakening the regiment's right flank, though the left and center held fast. The arrival of the 140th New York helped to stabilize the 3rd Brigade's right flank and drive back the Confederates.

Although the 3rd Brigade held Little Round Top and the Union prevailed at Gettysburg, questions about Welch's withdrawal were raised, some witnesses calling it a reasonable action—citing the regiment's tenuous position and bullet-riddled colors—while others were critical. After giving an initial sympathetic report, then-Captain Benjamin Partridge of G Company wrote of his commanding officer two years later: "During the hottest part of the battle in the p.m. towards night, the colonel left with the colors for some reason." In his report, Welch attributed the retreat to Lieutenant William Kydd of C Company, whom Welch said ordered a withdrawal after hearing a shouted hilltop order to do so from either the corps or brigade commander. Whatever the truth, Welch's reputation suffered thereafter, even as he was promoted to colonel in October, retroactive to May.

=== Petersburg and death ===
After Gettysburg, Welch took an extended leave from the 16th, spending most of the next year recruiting in Detroit. His absence from the 16th's campaigns of the spring of 1864 fostered resentment in many of the regiment's ranks. He rejoined the 16th on June 20, 1864, at the beginning of the Petersburg Campaign south of Richmond, Virginia.

On September 30, the 3rd Brigade was engaged at the Battle of Peebles' Farm, the Union objective being a railroad line protected by a brigade of dismounted Confederate cavalry, entrenched in a fort surrounded by earthworks. As the Michiganders charged over the earthworks, Welch stood atop them, sword raised, yelling "Come on!" Captain Charles H. Salter wrote: "Our colonel stood on top of the works, urging his men to get over...he was shot through the head and fell dead." With Welch's death and the decimation of the 16th's officer corps, command fell to Captain Salter, and the Union troops successfully captured the fort after brutal hand-to-hand fighting. The Union fortification built on the site of the battle was named Fort Welch.

== Legacy ==
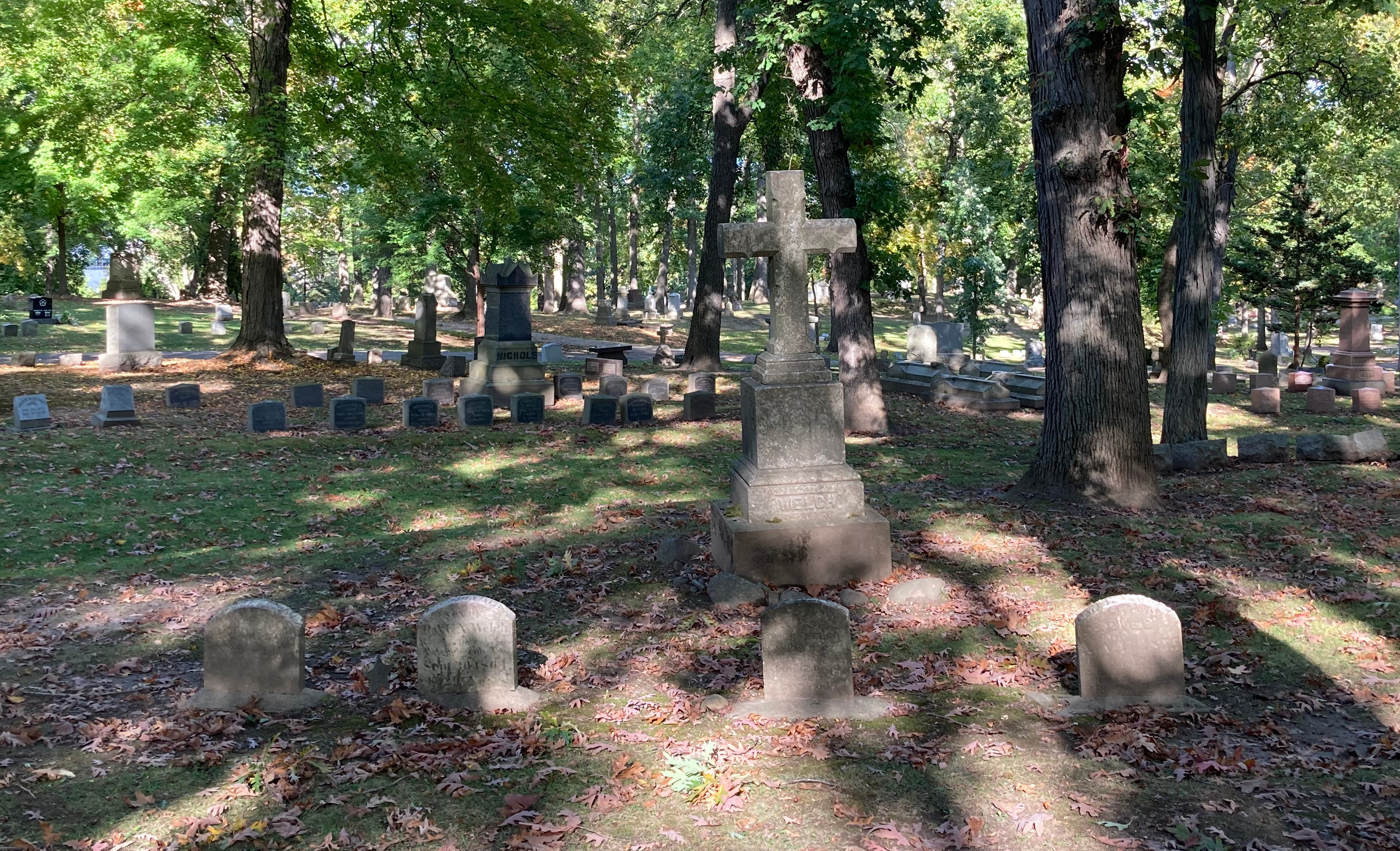
Welch's grave at Forest Hill Cemetery

In the aftermath of Peebles' Farm, Welch's body was embalmed and returned to Ann Arbor, where he was buried in Forest Hill Cemetery with full Masonic rites. The city's Grand Army of the Republic post was subsequently named for him.

According to 16th Michigan historian Kim Crawford, the regiment's break under Welch's command at Gettysburg was significant but not particularly rare for a Civil War battle, its gravity elevated by the "mythic importance" that would be attached to Little Round Top in subsequent years. Crawford underscored that the 16th was the smallest and most exposed regiment of the 3rd Brigade, and was being attacked by four full Confederate regiments. Oliver Willcox Norton's 1913 book The Attack and Defense of Little Round Top, Gettysburg, July 2, 1863 was particularly critical of Welch, though Crawford noted that Norton's analysis was marred by numerous factual errors and a vendetta against Welch, whom Norton blamed for the death of Colonel Vincent.

In They Saved the Union at Little Round Top, Ken Discorfano offered a measured opinion:

Some think Welch was confused, and others think he actually reacted to some perceived orders shouted from a general on the hilltop...Probably, Welch was wishing for the latter, but found himself caught in the mix of the former and allowed more than a tinge of fear to control his actions for a moment. That is when mistakes are often made on the battlefield or on any other field in life. The immediate after-battle tension even among his own men is evidence that something went wrong with Lt. Col. Welch that day.

Like most sources, however, Norton admitted that after Gettysburg, Welch had "redeemed his reputation" in subsequent engagements, echoed by Colonel Benjamin Partridge of the 16th, who described Welch at Peebles' Farm: "He fell with sword uplifted in the air, his foot upon the enemy's works, and the shout of victory on his lips."
