= Francis Bishop =

Francis Bishop may refer to:

- Francis A. Bishop, American soldier who fought in the American Civil War
- Francis Gladden Bishop (1809–1864), minor leader in the Latter Day Saint movement
