= Breast (disambiguation) =

The breast is the upper ventral region of the torso of a primate.

Breast may also refer to:

- Thorax, or breast, a part of the anatomy of humans and various other animals
  - Breast meat, a part of poultry
- Chimney breast, a portion of a wall which projects forward over a fireplace
- The Breast (journal), a medical scientific journal
- The Breast, a 1972 novella
- Breasts (film), a 2020 Montenegrin film

== See also ==
- Brest (disambiguation)
