= Brest (surname) =

Brest is a surname. Notable people with the surname include:

- Harold Brest, 20th-century American prisoner
- Jorge Romero Brest (1905–1989), Argentine art critic and curator
- Lewis F. Brest (1842–1915), Union Army soldier
- Martin Brest (born 1951), American filmmaker, producer, screenwriter, film editor, and actor
- Paul Brest (born c. 1940), American academic
- Vida Brest (1925–1985), Slovenian poet and writer

Benjamin Issac Brest - Kansas
