= 84th Pennsylvania Infantry Regiment =

Union Army infantry regiment

84th Pennsylvania Volunteer Infantry
- Active: October 1861 to January 13, 1865
- Country: United States
- Allegiance: Union
- Branch: Infantry
- Size: 1,285
- Engagements: First Battle of Kernstown; Battle of Front Royal; Battle of Port Republic; Battle of Cedar Mountain; Battle of Groveton; Second Battle of Bull Run; Battle of Chantilly; Battle of Fredericksburg; Battle of Chancellorsville; Bristoe Campaign; Mine Run Campaign; Battle of the Wilderness; Battle of Spotsylvania Court House; Battle of Harris Farm; Battle of Cold Harbor; Siege of Petersburg; First Battle of Deep Bottom; Second Battle of Deep Bottom; Battle of Peebles' Farm; Battle of Boydton Plank Road

The 84th Pennsylvania Volunteer Infantry was an infantry regiment that served in the Union Army during the American Civil War.

== Service ==
The 84th Pennsylvania Infantry was organized at Huntingdon, Pennsylvania and Camp Curtin (in Harrisburg) beginning October 1861 and mustered in on December 23, 1861, for a three-year enlistment under the command of Colonel William Gray Murray.

The regiment was attached to 1st Brigade, Lander's Division, Army of the Potomac, to March 1862. 1st Brigade, Shield's 2nd Division, V Corps, to April 1862. 1st Brigade, Shield's Division, Department of the Shenandoah, to May 1862. 4th Brigade, Shield's Division, Department of the Rappahannock, to June 1862. 4th Brigade, 2nd Division, III Corps, Army of Virginia, to September 1863. 2nd Brigade, 3rd Division, III Corps, Army of the Potomac, to June 1863. 1st Brigade, 2nd Division, III Corps, to March 1864. 2nd Brigade, 4th Division, II Corps, to May 1864. 4th Brigade, 3rd Division, II Corps, to July 1864. 2nd Brigade, 3rd Division, II Corps, to January 1865.

The 84th Pennsylvania Infantry ceased to exist on January 13, 1865, when it was consolidated with the 57th Pennsylvania Infantry.

== Detailed service ==
At Camp Curtin until December 31, 1861. Moved to Hancock, Md., December 31 – January 2, 1862, then to Bath. Action at Bath January 4, and at Hancock January 5. Retreat to Cumberland, Md., January 10–12, 1862. Duty guarding North and South Branch Bridges and at Paw Paw Tunnel until March 1862. Advance on Winchester, Va., March 5–15. First Battle of Kernstown March 23. Occupation of Mt. Jackson April 17. Provost at Berryville until May 2. March to Fredericksburg May 12–22, and return to Front Royal May 25–29. Action near Front Royal May 31. Port Republic June 8–9. Moved to Alexandria June 29. Duty there until July. Battle of Cedar Mountain August 9. Pope's Campaign in northern Virginia August 16 – September 2. Fords of the Rappahannock August 20–24. Thoroughfare Gap August 28. Battles of Groveton August 29, Bull Run August 30, Chantilly September 1. Duty at Arlington Heights, defenses of Washington, Whipple's Command, until October. Moved to Pleasant Valley, Md., October 18, then to Warrenton and Falmouth October 24 – November 19. Battle of Fredericksburg, December 12–15. Burnside's 2nd Campaign, "Mud March," January 20–24, 1863. At Falmouth, Va., until April. Chancellorsville Campaign April 27 – May 6. Battle of Chancellorsville May 1–5. Gettysburg Campaign June 11 – July 24. Guarding Corps' trains during battle of Gettysburg July 1–3. Pursuit of Lee July 5–24. Wapping Heights, Va., July 23. Duty on line of the Rappahannock until October. Bristoe Campaign October 9–22. Advance to line of the Rappahannock November 7–8. Kelly's Ford November 7. Mine Run Campaign November 26 – December 2. Payne's Farm November 27. Regiment reenlisted January 1864. Demonstration on the Rapidan February 6–7. Duty near Brandy Station until May. Rapidan Campaign May 4–June 12. Battles of the Wilderness May 5–7, Spotsylvania May 8–12, Spotsylvania Court House May 12–21. Assault on the Salient May 12. Harris Farm May 19. North Anna River May 23–26. Line of the Pamunkey May 26–28. Totopotomoy May 28–31. Haw's Shop May 31. Cold Harbor June 1–12. Before Petersburg June 16–18. Siege of Petersburg June 16, 1864, to January 6, 1865. Weldon Railroad June 22–23, 1864. Demonstration north of James River at Deep Bottom July 27–29. Deep Bottom July 27–28. Mine Explosion, Petersburg, July 30 (reserve). Demonstration north of the James at Deep Bottom August 13–20. Strawberry Plains, Deep Bottom, August 14–18. Peebles' Farm, Poplar Grove Church, September 29 – October 2. Boydton Plank Road, October 27–28.

== Casualties ==
The regiment lost a total of 224 men during service; 6 officers and 119 enlisted men killed or mortally wounded, 1 officer and 98 enlisted men died from disease-related causes.

== Commanders ==
- Colonel William Gray Murray – killed in action at the Battle of Kernstown
- Colonel Samuel M. Bowman
- Colonel George Zinn - wounded at Petersburg
- Lieutenant Colonel Walter Barrett
- Lieutenant Colonel Thomas Harrold Craig – wounded at the Battle of Port Republic
- Lieutenant Colonel Thomas MacDowell
- Lieutenant Colonel Milton Opp – killed in action at the Battle of the Wilderness

== See also ==
- 57th Pennsylvania Infantry
- List of Pennsylvania Civil War Units
- Pennsylvania in the Civil War
