= Charles Thomas Campbell =

American politician

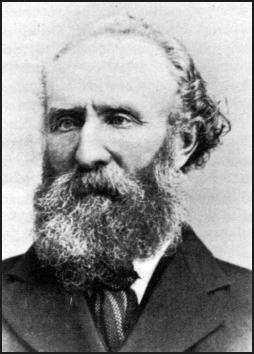
- Born: August 10, 1823; St. Thomas Township, Pennsylvania, US
- Died: April 15, 1895 (aged 71); Scotland, South Dakota, US
- Burial place: Yankton City Cemetery, Yankton, South Dakota, US
- Military career
- Allegiance: United States; Union
- Branch: United States Army; Union Army
- Service years: 1846–1848, 1861–1866
- Rank: Brigadier General
- Commands: 57th Pennsylvania Infantry
- Conflicts: Mexican–American War; American Civil War

Charles Thomas Campbell (August 10, 1823 – April 15, 1895) was a United States Army soldier, and a legislator, businessman, and town mayor. He also served as a Union Army general during the American Civil War, and was seriously wounded several times in the conflict.

== Early life and career ==
Campbell was born on August 10, 1823, in St. Thomas Township, Franklin County, Pennsylvania, and he studied at Marshall College (known now as Franklin & Marshall College) located in Lancaster. In 1846 Campbell served in the U.S. Army during the Mexican–American War, assigned as a second lieutenant in the 8th U.S. Infantry. On February 11, 1847, Campbell was promoted to first lieutenant, and on April 9 he joined the 11th U.S. Infantry. In August 1847 he was promoted to the rank of captain in the 11th U.S. Infantry, and was honorably discharged on August 14, 1848. In 1852 Campbell was elected to the lower house of the Pennsylvania General Assembly.

== Civil War service ==
At the beginning of the American Civil War in 1861, Campbell chose to follow his home state and the Union cause. He volunteered for service in the state forces on May 29, and was assigned as a captain of Battery A in the Pennsylvania Light Artillery. On August 5 Campbell was promoted to lieutenant colonel in the Pennsylvania Artillery, and to colonel on September 13. On December 20 Campbell participated in the Battle of Dranesville in Fairfax County, Virginia, and he resigned from the state forces on February 1, 1862.

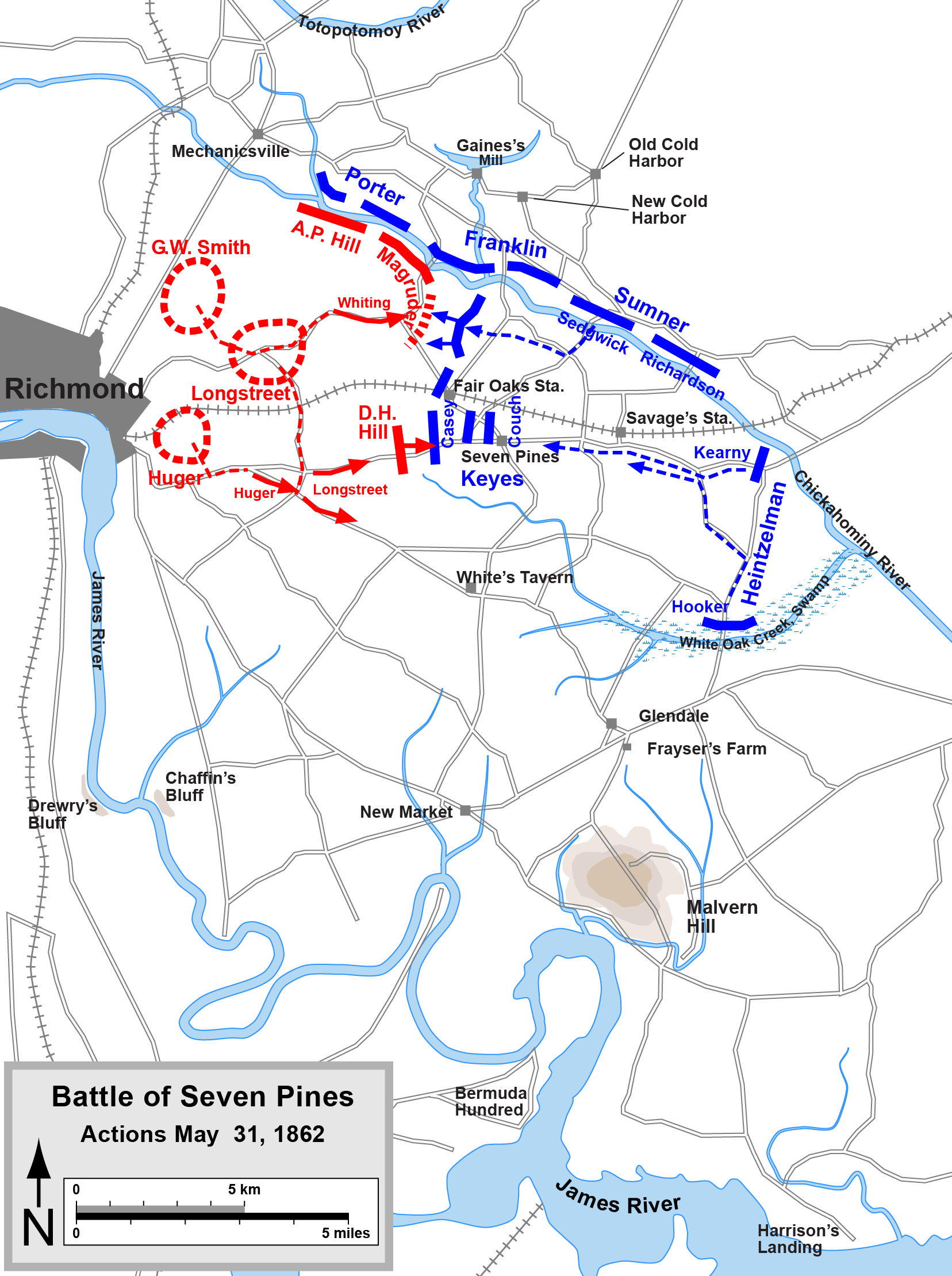
Battle of Seven Pines

Joining the Union Army in 1862, Campbell was appointed to command the 57th Pennsylvania Infantry as its colonel. He led the 57th Infantry, part of Brig. Gen. Philip Kearny's division, in the Peninsula Campaign of 1862, fighting at the Battle of Seven Pines on May 31. In the battle Campbell's horse was shot from under him, and he was severely wounded three times. Campbell was hit in the right arm, pelvis, and left leg, and was captured by Confederate soldiers. Despite these injuries Campbell managed to escape later that day.

With his right arm still in a sling, Campbell led the 57th during the Fredericksburg Campaign in the winter of 1862. At the Battle of Fredericksburg on December 13, he was again seriously wounded, hit in his abdomen and the same right arm. The wound in his belly went through his liver, and Campbell was considered beyond hope and left for dead. He had been appointed a brigadier general in the Union Army on November 29, 1862, but it was never confirmed and this appointment would expire on March 4, 1863.

Partially recovered, Campbell was promoted to brigadier general on March 13, 1863, and given command of the Union District of Wisconsin in the Department of the Northwest on November 7, 1864. He led this district until the end of the war, and was mustered out of the volunteer service on January 15, 1866.

== Postbellum ==
After the American Civil War, Campbell relocated to the Dakota Territory. He worked as an Inspector of Indian agencies, then a Stage Line operator, and a hotel operator. In 1870 Campbell established a stagecoach stop along the Firesteel Trail, which included his residence, an inn, a general store, and a large horse barn. It grew into the town of Scotland, and he became active in Democratic politics, serving as mayor of the town he helped found.

Campbell died in Scotland, South Dakota at the age of 71, six days after being injured when he fell from the steps of his hotel on April 9, 1895. He was buried in Yankton City Cemetery, located in Yankton, South Dakota.

== See also ==
- List of American Civil War generals (Union)
