= George Zinn =

American Union Army officer (1842–1899)

- Born: 1842; Harrisburg, Pennsylvania, U.S.
- Died: April 25, 1899 (aged 56–57); Harrisburg, Pennsylvania, U.S.
- Military career
- Allegiance: United States; Union
- Branch: Union Army
- Rank: Brigadier general
- Commands: 84th Pennsylvania Infantry; 57th Pennsylvania Infantry
- Conflicts: American Civil War

George Zinn (1842 – April 25, 1899) was a Union Army officer during the American Civil War. President Andrew Johnson nominated him on January 13, 1866 for appointment to the grade of brevet brigadier general of volunteers, to rank from April 6, 1865, and the United States Senate confirmed the appointment on March 12, 1866.

== Early life ==
George Zinn was born in 1842 in Harrisburg, Pennsylvania. He was a hardware merchant before the American Civil War.

== Civil War ==
George Zinn began his service in the Union Army on October 1, 1861 as a second lieutenant in the 84th Pennsylvania Infantry Regiment. He was promoted to captain on October 2, 1862 and to lieutenant colonel on August 1, 1864. On January 13, 1865, he was transferred to the 57th Pennsylvania Infantry Regiment when the 84th Pennsylvania Infantry Regiment was consolidated with that regiment. He was appointed colonel of the 57th Pennsylvania Infantry Regiment on March 19, 1865. He was mustered out of the volunteers on June 29, 1865.

On January 13, 1866, President Andrew Johnson nominated Zinn for appointment to the grade of brevet brigadier general of volunteers, to rank from April 6, 1865, and the United States Senate confirmed the appointment on March 12, 1866.

== Family ==
Zinn's son, Captain George Zinn, demonstrated the Browning machine gun to the American Expeditionary Force during World War I. His grandson George Zinn was a pilot who was killed during a mid-air collision over Trenton, New Jersey.

== Death ==
George Zinn died in Harrisburg, Pennsylvania on April 25, 1899. He was interred in Harrisburg Cemetery in Harrisburg, Pennsylvania.

== See also ==
- List of American Civil War brevet generals (Union)
