= Brest, Ig =

Brest
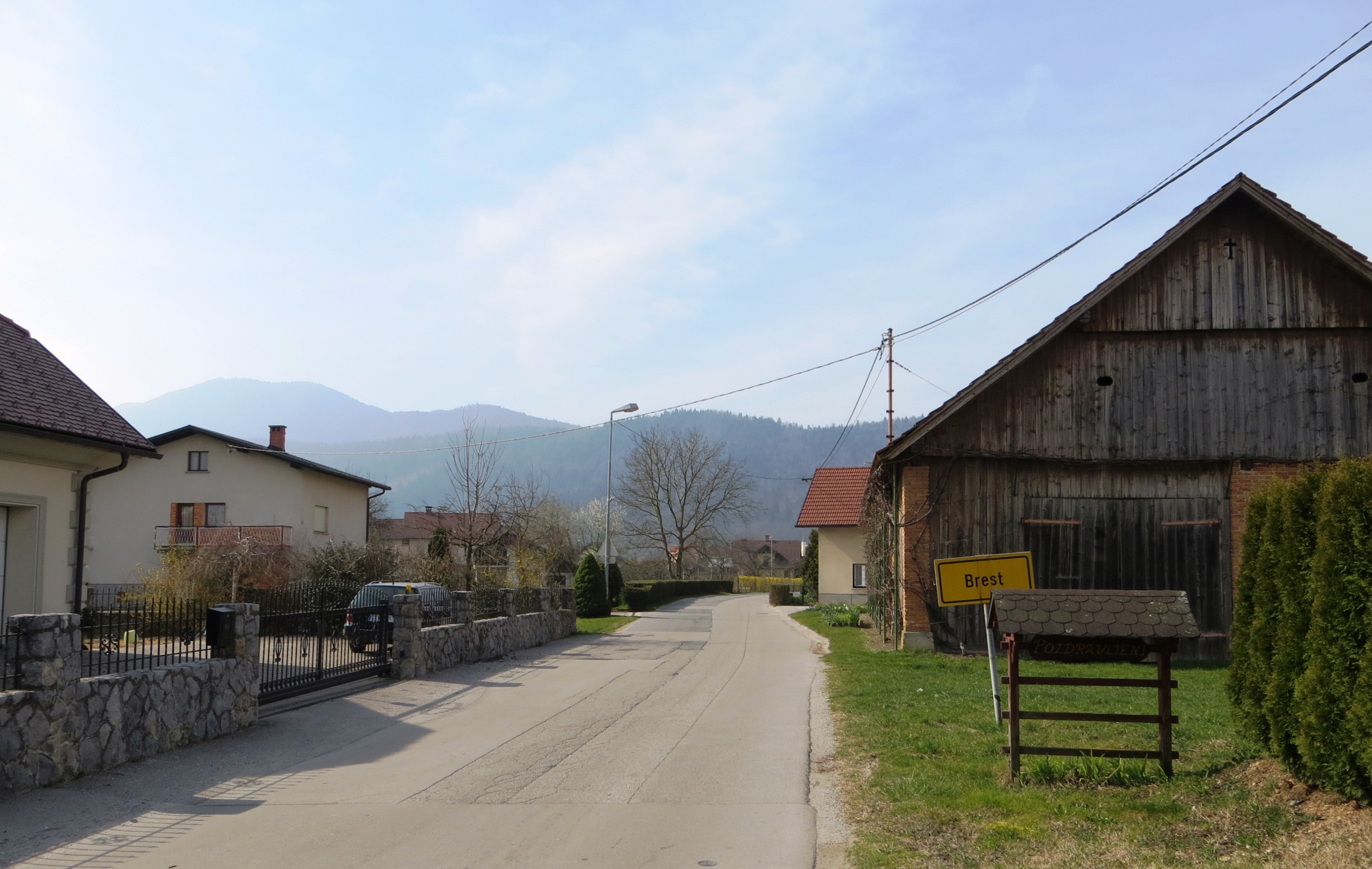

- Location in Slovenia
- Coordinates: 45°59′51.28″N 14°30′12.95″E
- Country: Slovenia
- Traditional region: Inner Carniola
- Statistical region: Central Slovenia
- Municipality: Ig

Area
  - Total: 6.86 km^{2} (2.65 sq mi)
- Elevation: 288.3 m (946 ft)

Population (2002)
  - Total: 278
- Postal code: 1292

Brest (pronounced [ˈbɾeːst]; German: Wröst) is a village in the Municipality of Ig in central Slovenia, just south of the capital Ljubljana. The entire municipality is part of the traditional region of Inner Carniola and is now included in the Central Slovenia Statistical Region.

== Geography ==
Brest is a ribbon village along the road from Ig to Podpeč in a level area northeast of Tomišelj where the gravelly alluvial plain of the Iška River meets the actual soil of the Ljubljana Marsh. Sandy soil and fields extend to the south in an area known as Peščenke. Marshy meadows lie to the north, where the fields are arranged in beds with drainage canals. Northeast of the settlement, the territory of Brest includes a grove known as Kosler's Thicket (Slovene: Kozlerjeva gošča), named after Peter Kosler.

== Name ==
Brest was attested in written sources in 1330 as Fraezzen (and as Vrezzen circa 1330 and Brezzt in 1401). The name is derived from the Slovene common noun brest 'elm', referring to the local vegetation.

== History ==
A dugout canoe belonging to the prehistoric pile-dwellers' culture from the Ljubljana March was discovered in Brest during work in the courtyard of Brest Manor, testifying to early settlement of the area. During the Second World War, Franc Frakelj and the Črna Roka (Black Hand) organization killed local people in the winter of 1943–44 in Kosler's Thicket. A monument was set up in Kosler's Thicket commemorating the events. It stands on the edge of the grove and is made of stone blocks to create a stylized representation of Mount Triglav, and it has a plaque with the names of the victims.

== Brest Manor ==
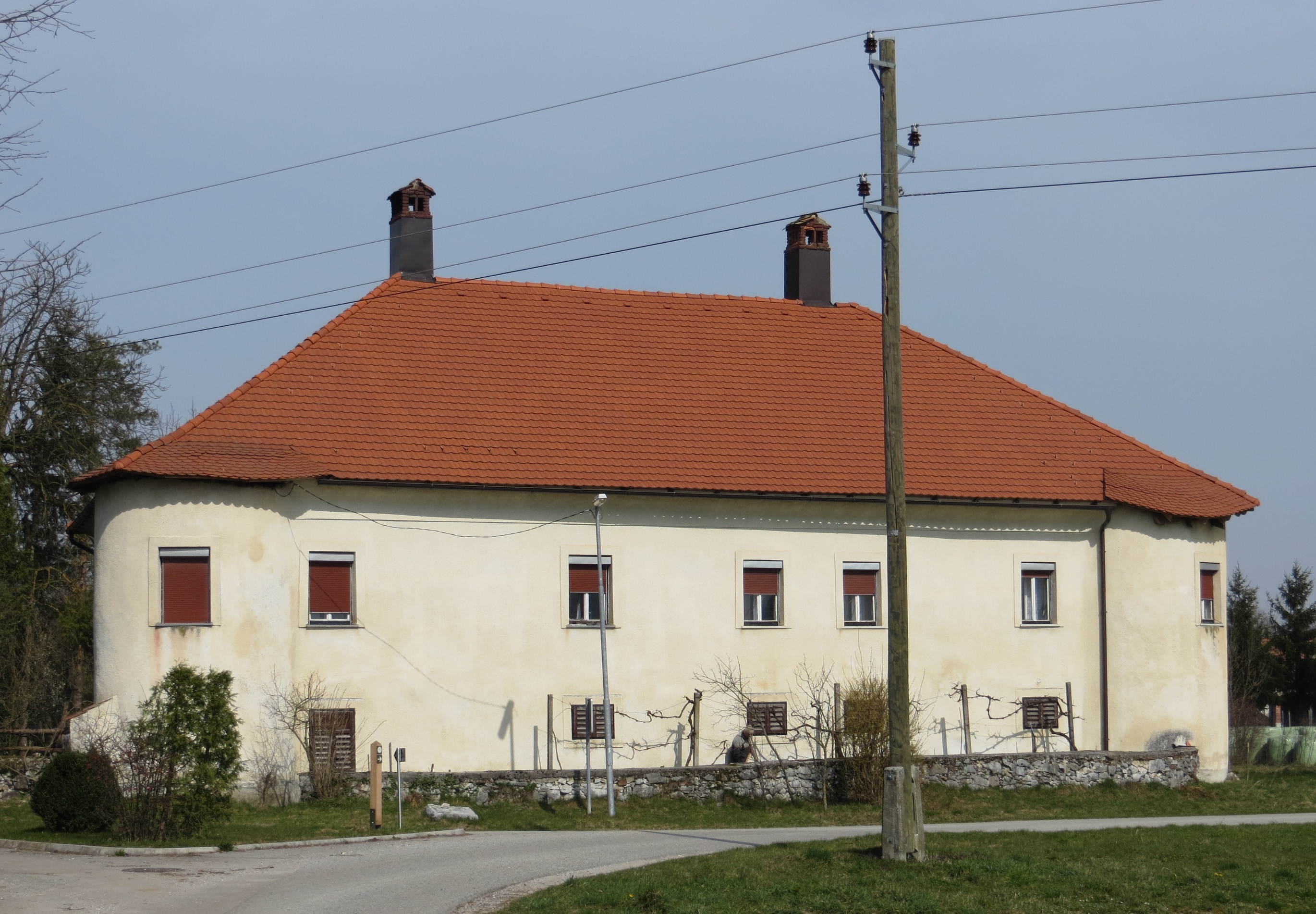
Brest Manor

Brest Manor (in older sources also Gradič, German: Ebenporten) was built in 1664 by the nobleman Hans Christoph Portner. The structure was recorded by Johann Weikhard von Valvasor under the name Eben-Porthen. The manor house is accentuated by round corner towers. Later the manor passed into the ownership of the Galle family, and then into the hands of the farmer Friderik Švigelj.

== Church ==
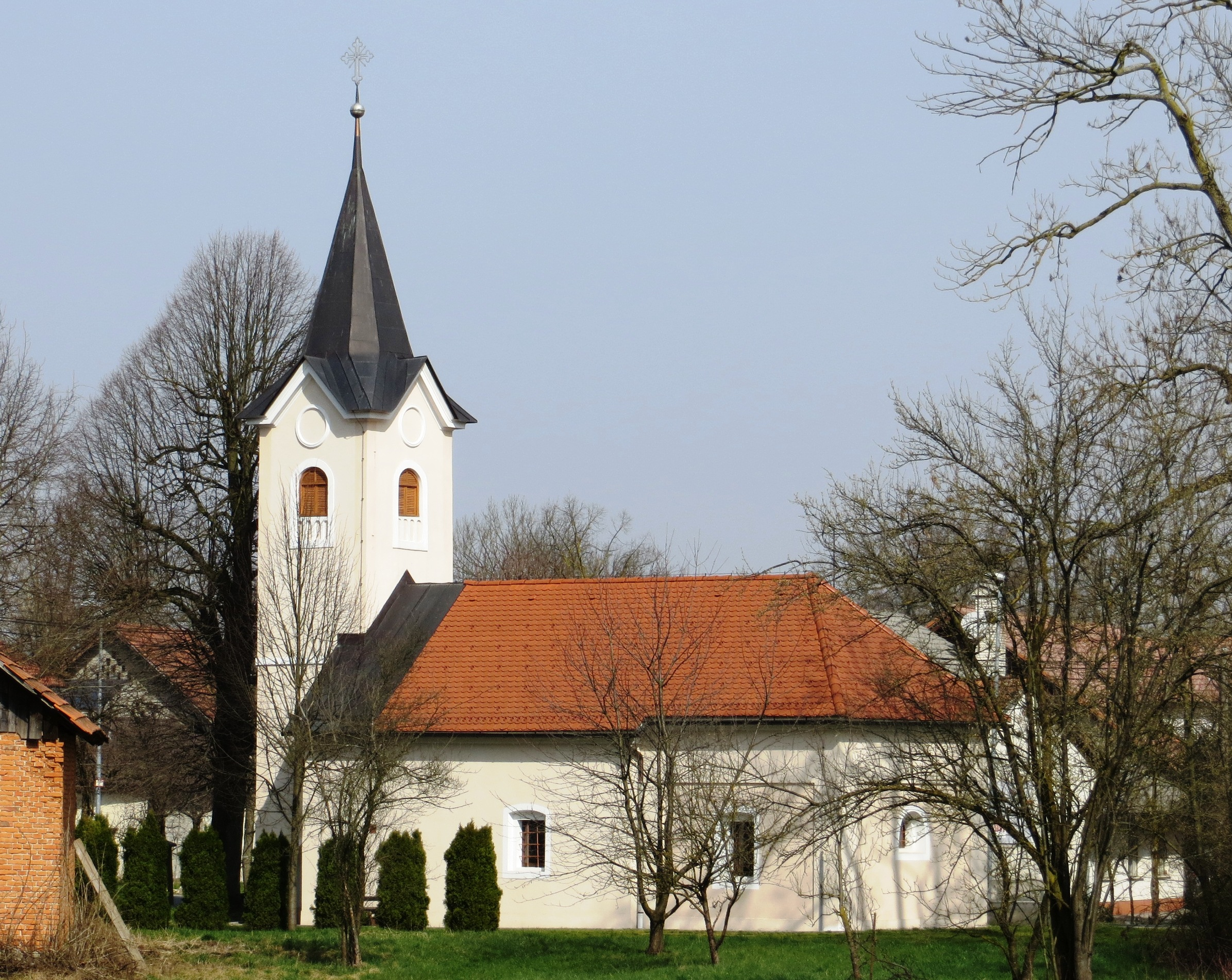
Saint Andrew's Church

The local church, built on the eastern outskirts of the settlement, is dedicated to Saint Andrew and belongs to the Parish of Tomišelj. It was built in the early 17th century and extensively rebuilt in the early 18th century. The church was dedicated in 1614 by Bishop Thomas Chrön. The complex main altar was added during the renovation in the 18th century. The church's wooden choir loft features an elaborately carved railing.
