= Lewis F. Brest =

American soldier

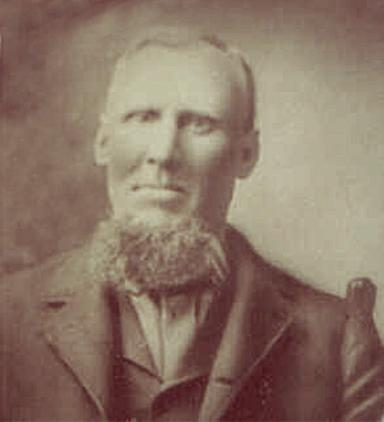
- Born: May 15, 1842; Mercer, Pennsylvania
- Died: December 2, 1915 (aged 73)
- Burial place: Mercer, Pennsylvania
- Military career
- Allegiance: United States of America
- Branch: United States Army; Union Army
- Service years: 1861 - 1865
- Rank: Private
- Unit: 57th Regiment Pennsylvania Volunteer Infantry
- Conflicts: Battle of Sailor's Creek
- Awards: Medal of Honor

Lewis Francis Brest (May 15, 1842 - December 2, 1915) was an American soldier who received the Medal of Honor for valor during the American Civil War.

== Biography ==
Brest served in the American Civil War in the 57th Pennsylvania Infantry for the Union Army. He received the Medal of Honor on May 10, 1865 for his actions at the Battle of Sailor's Creek.

== Medal of Honor citation ==
Rank and organization: Private, Company D, 57th Pennsylvania Infantry. Place and date: At Sailors Creek, Va., 6 April 1865. Entered service at:------. Birth: Mercer, Pa. Date of Issue: 10 May 1865.

Citation:

Capture of flag.

== See also ==
- List of American Civil War Medal of Honor recipients: A-F
