= Yaroslav the Wise's attack on Brest =

1022 attack on Brest, Belarus

Date	1022
Location	Brest, Belarus
Result	Polish victory

Belligerents
Kievan Rus'	Civitas Schinesghe

Commanders and leaders
Yaroslav the Wise	Bolesław the Brave

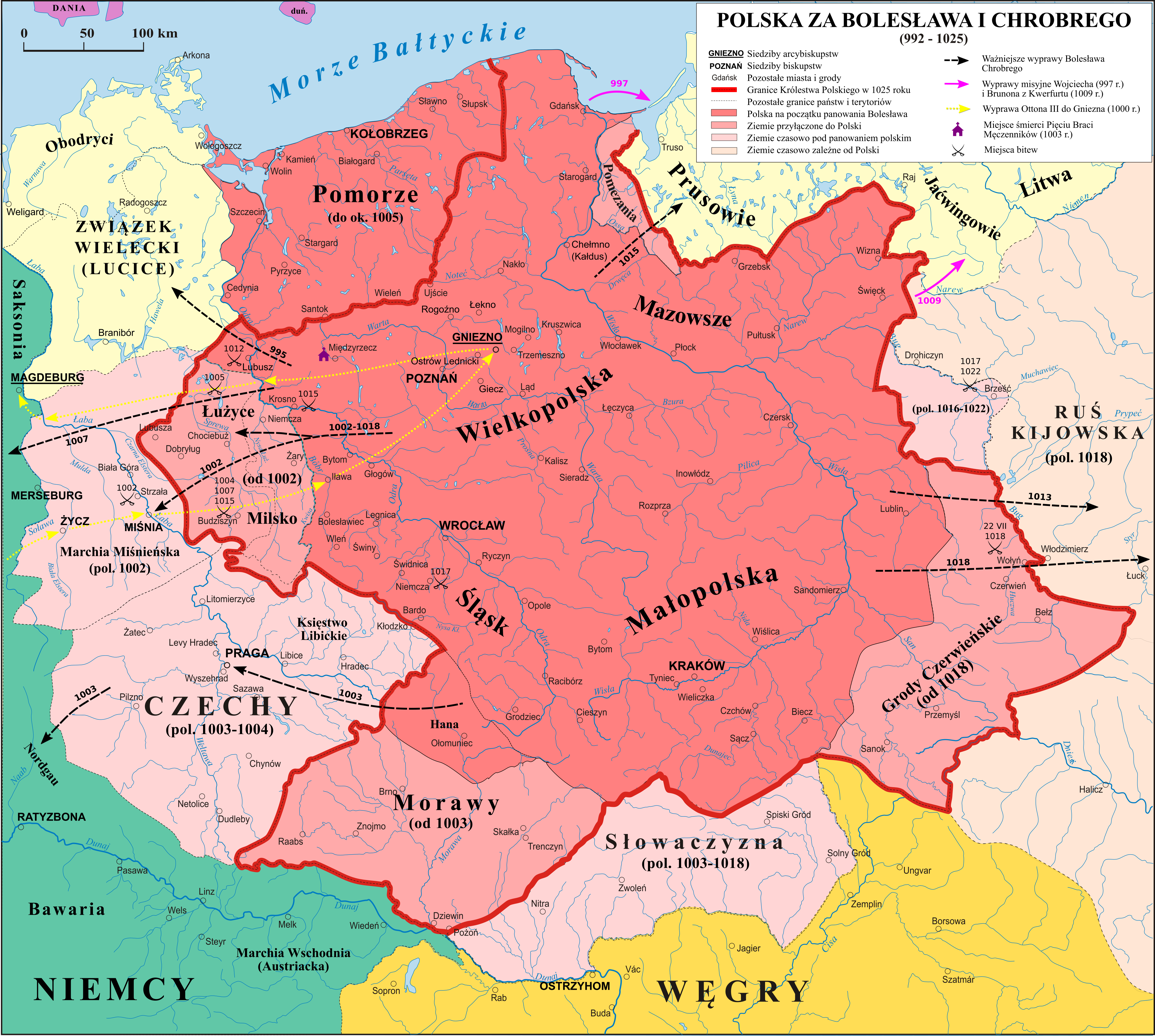
Map of Poland during the reign of Boleslawl l the Brave

Yaroslav the Wise's attack on Brest (pl: Atak Jarosława Mądrego na Brześć) was a campaign in 1022 by Grand Prince of Kiev Yaroslav the Wise leading the Kievan Rus' against Civitas Schinesghe led by Bolesław I the Brave, Duke of Poland at the time. It ended in a Polish victory. The campaign according to some sources is legendary.
