= 16th Michigan Infantry Regiment =

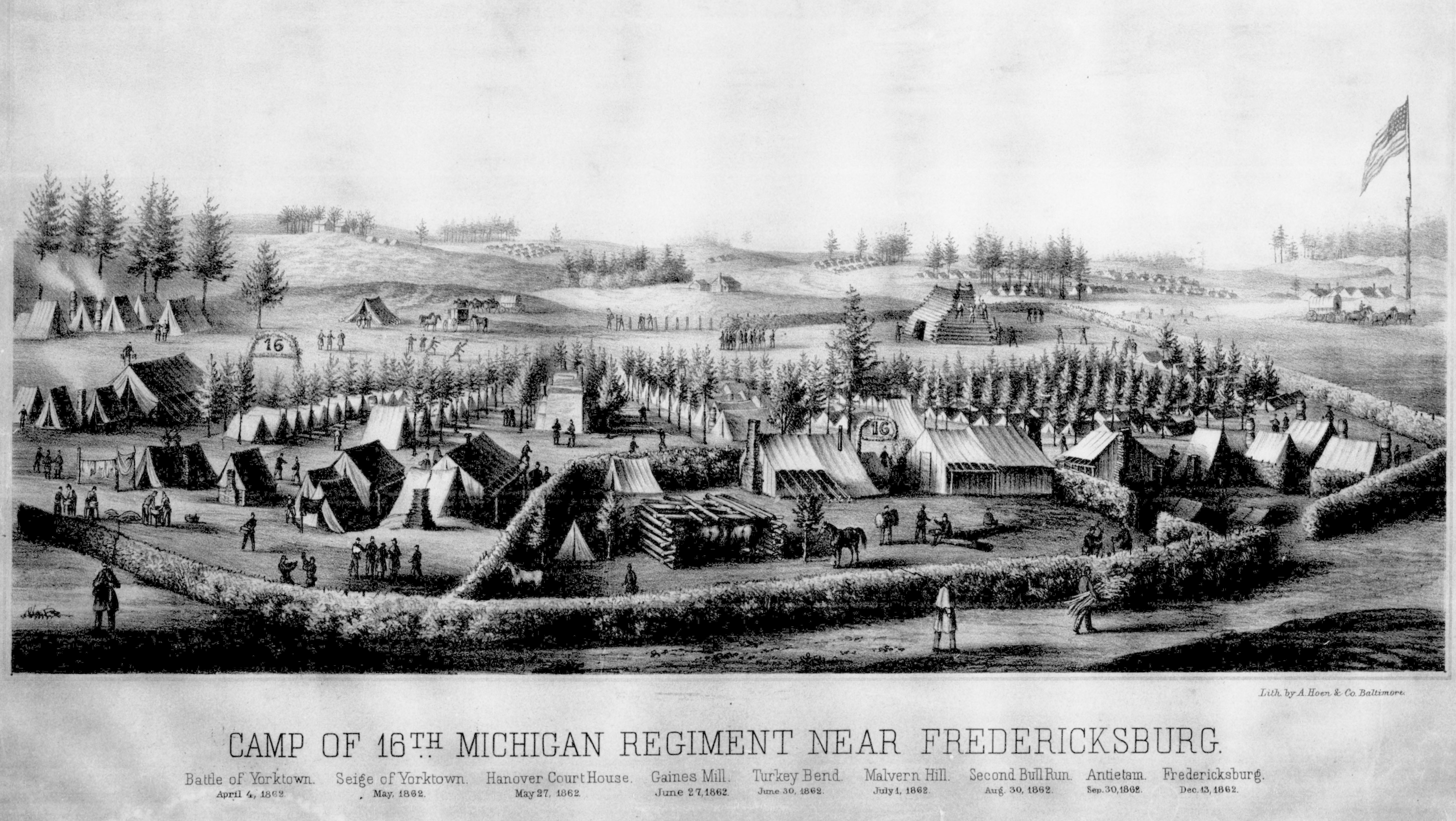
- Lithograph of the 16th Michigan camped at Fredericksburg, Virginia, 1862
- Active: September 8, 1861–July 8, 1865
- Country: United States
- Allegiance: Union
- Branch: Infantry
- Part of: 3rd Brigade, 1st Division, III Corps, Army of the Potomac; 3rd Brigade, 1st Division, V Corps, Army of the Potomac
- Engagements: American Civil War; Peninsular Campaign; Battle of Second Bull Run; Battle of Antietam; Battle of Fredericksburg; Battle of Chancellorsville; Battle of Gettysburg; Battle of the Wilderness; Battle of Spotsylvania Court House; Battle of Cold Harbor; Siege of Petersburg; Battle of Five Forks; Appomattox Campaign

Commanders
- Colonel of the Regiment: T.B.W. Stockton; Norval E. Welch; Benjamin F. Partridge

The 16th Michigan Infantry Regiment was an infantry regiment that served in the Union Army during the American Civil War.

== Service ==
The 16th Michigan Infantry was organized as T.B.W. Stockton's Independent Regiment at Plymouth and Detroit, Michigan between July and September, 1861. Among the soldiers in the 16th was future Michigan state politician Henry H. Aplin. It was mustered into U.S. service as the 16th Regiment, Michigan Volunteer Infantry on Sept. 8, 1861 with an enrollment of 761 officers and men. The Regiment left Detroit for Washington, D.C., on Sept. 16, 1861 to join Butterfield's Brigade, Fitz John Porter's Division, Army of the Potomac. It went into camp at Hall's Hill, Arlington, Virginia, Defences of Washington, D.C., for the winter of 1861–62.

=== Gettysburg ===
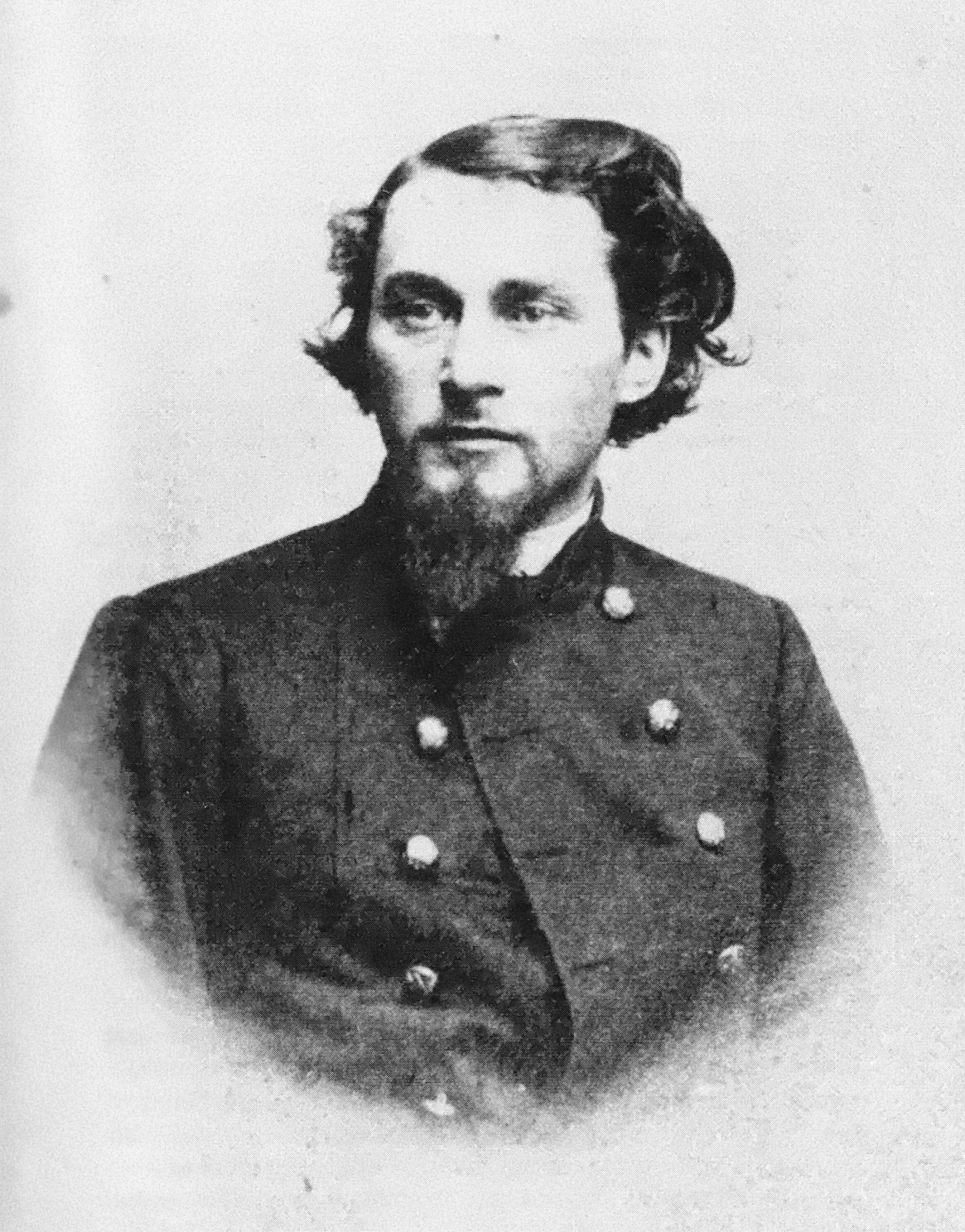
Col. Norval E. Welch

At the Battle of Gettysburg on the second day they defended Little Round Top against a determined Confederate attack aimed at flanking the Union Army. They were one of four regiments, of the 3rd brigade, of the 1st Division of the V Corps of the Union Army of the Potomac. The 3rd brigade was commanded by Col. Strong Vincent. It consisted of the 16th Michigan, the 44th New York, the 83rd Pennsylvania, and the 20th Maine, placed in that order right to left, with the 16th at the right end closest to the rest of the Union Army, and the 20th Maine at the left end, the actual end of the entire Union Army at Gettysburg.

The 3rd brigade arrived at Little Round Top only minutes before the Confederate attack. The 16th Michigan bore repeated attacks from the 4th and 5th Texas. The 16th was the smallest regiment in the brigade, with only 263 men. Several times Vincent successfully rallied the 16th Michigan to repel the Texas charge. Vincent was mortally wounded during one Texas charge and died on July 7, after receiving a deathbed promotion to brigadier general.

Before the Michiganders could be overrun, reinforcements arrived in the form of the 140th New York and a battery of four guns—Battery D, 5th U.S. Artillery. The 140th New York took position immediately to the right of the 16th Michigan.

The 16th Michigan remained in position on Little Round Top for the rest of the Battle of Gettysburg.

== End of Service ==
The regiment was mustered out of service on July 8, 1865.

== Total strength and casualties ==
The regiment suffered 12 officers and 235 enlisted men who were killed in action or mortally wounded and 143 enlisted men who died of disease, for a total of 390 fatalities.

== Original field staff ==
- Colonel Thomas B. Stockton of Flint, Michigan, age not available
- Lt. Colonel John V. Reuhle of Detroit, Michigan, age not available
- Major Norval E. Welch of Ann Arbor, Michigan, 26
- Surgeon Isaac Wixam of Argentine, Michigan, 58
- Asst. Surgeon William H. Butler of Buffalo, New York, 36
- Adjutant Thomas E. Morris of East Saginaw, Michigan, 26
- Quartermaster Miner S. Newell of Flushing, Michigan, 32
- Chaplain William H. Brockway of Plymouth, Michigan, 48

== See also ==
- List of Michigan Civil War Units
- Michigan in the American Civil War
