= Brześć (disambiguation) =

Brześć is the Polish name for Brest, Belarus.

Brześć may also refer to:

- Brześć Kujawski, a town in north-central Poland
- Brześć, Kuyavian-Pomeranian Voivodeship, a village in north-central Poland
