= Břest =

- Municipality
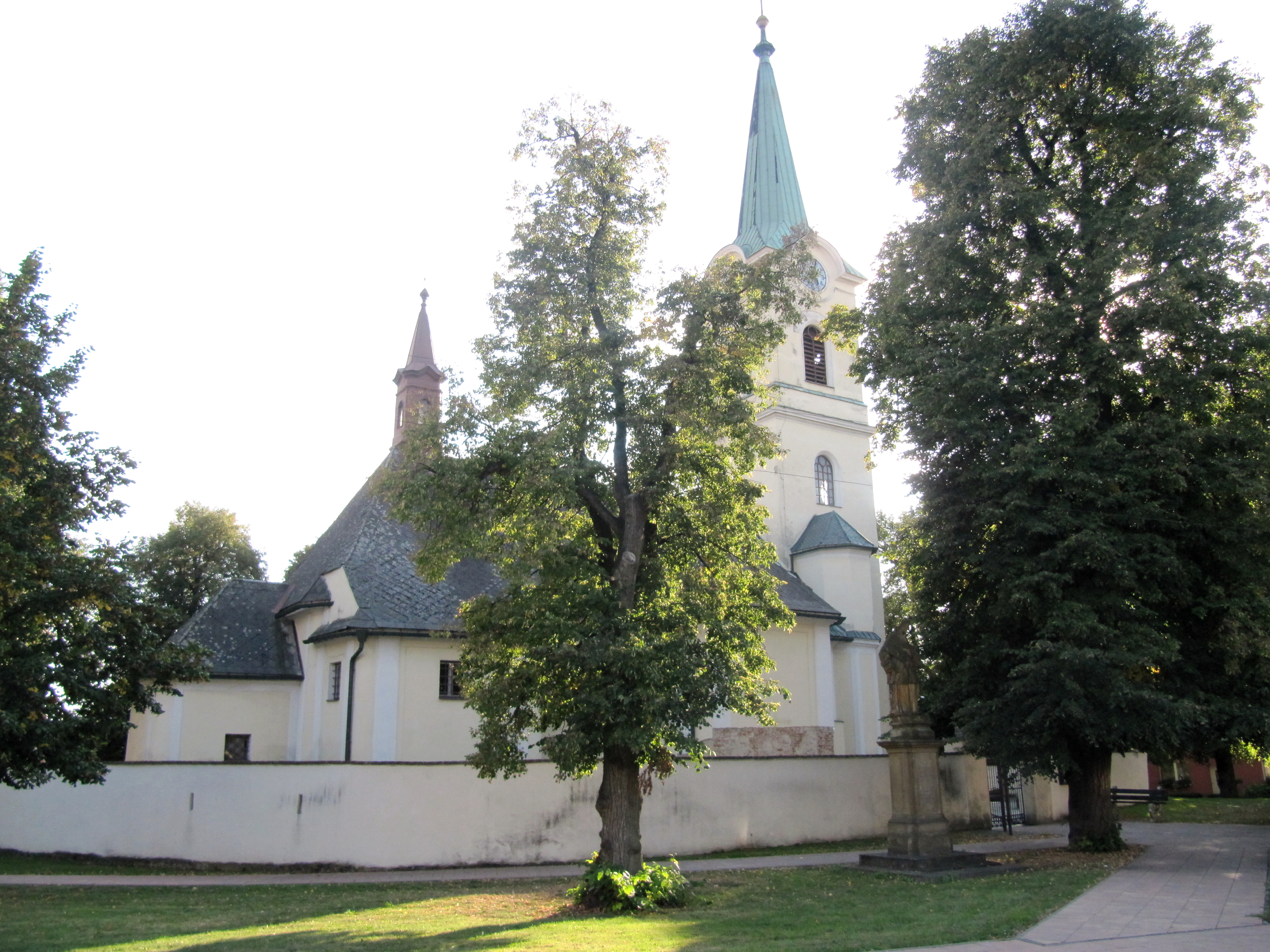
- Church of Saint James the Great

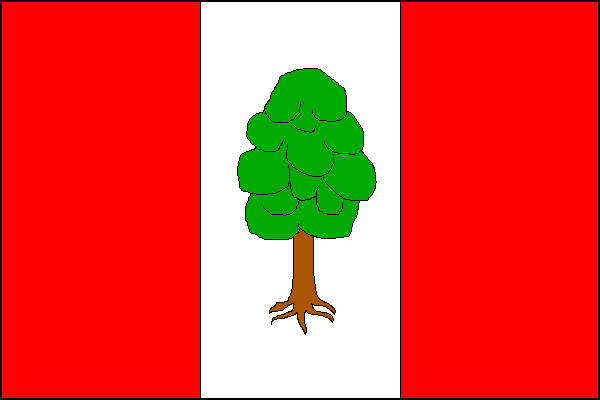
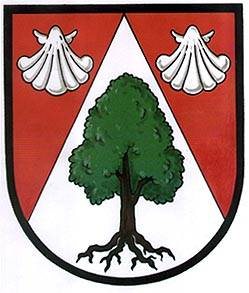
- Flag Coat of arms

- Location in the Czech Republic
- Coordinates: 49°21′4″N 17°26′27″E
- Country: Czech Republic
- Region: Zlín
- District: Kroměříž
- First mentioned: 1141

Area
  - Total: 10.83 km^{2} (4.18 sq mi)
- Elevation: 198 m (650 ft)

Population (2026-01-01)
  - Total: 1,008
  - Density: 93.07/km^{2} (241.1/sq mi)
- Time zone: UTC+1 (CET)
  - Summer (DST): UTC+2 (CEST)
- Postal code: 768 23
- Website: www.obec-brest.cz

Břest is a municipality and village in Kroměříž District in the Zlín Region of the Czech Republic. It has about 1,000 inhabitants.

Břest lies approximately 7 kilometres (4 mi) north-east of Kroměříž, 22 km (14 mi) north-west of Zlín, and 233 km (145 mi) east of Prague.

== Demographics ==
Historical population
Year	Pop.	±%
1869	879	—
1880	968	+10.1%
1890	1,001	+3.4%
1900	1,043	+4.2%
1910	1,161	+11.3%
1921	1,213	+4.5%
1930	1,253	+3.3%
1950	1,068	−14.8%
1961	1,099	+2.9%
1970	960	−12.6%
1980	883	−8.0%
1991	882	−0.1%
2001	965	+9.4%
2011	894	−7.4%
2021	953	+6.6%
Source: Censuses
