= The Breast (journal) =

- Discipline: Breast cancer
- Language: English
- Edited by: Fatima Cardoso, Karen Gelmon

Publication details
- History: 1992-present
- Publisher: Elsevier
- Frequency: Bimonthly
- Impact factor: 5.7 (2023)

Standard abbreviations
- ISO 4: Breast

Indexing
- CODEN: BREAEK
- ISSN: 0960-9776 (print); 1532-3080 (web)
- LCCN: 26672025

Links
- Journal homepage; Online access

The Breast is a peer-reviewed medical journal published by Elsevier covering research on breast cancer. It is an associate journal of the Australasian Society for Breast Disease
