= Francis A. Bishop =

- Born: Bradford County, Pennsylvania
- Died: Michigan
- Military career
- Allegiance: United States of America
- Branch: United States Army; Union Army
- Service years: 15 September 1861 to 29 June 1865
- Rank: Private
- Unit: 57th Regiment Pennsylvania Volunteer Infantry - Company C
- Conflicts: Battle of Spotsylvania Court House
- Awards: Medal of Honor

Private Francis A. Bishop was an American soldier who fought in the American Civil War. Bishop received the country's highest award for bravery during combat, the Medal of Honor, for his action during the Battle of Spotsylvania Court House in Virginia on 12 May 1864. He was honored with the award on 1 December 1864.

== Biography ==
Bishop was born in Bradford County, Pennsylvania. He enlisted into the 57th Pennsylvania Infantry on 15 September 1861. After his Medal of Honor event he also participated in other event. He attained the rank of corporal and mustered out on 29 June 1865. He moved to Retsil, Washington after the war and died there. His remains are interred in Blanchard, Michigan.

== Medal of Honor citation ==
Capture of flag.

== See also ==
- List of American Civil War Medal of Honor recipients: A–F
