= Brest, Makedonski Brod =

Brest Брест
- Village
- Location within North Macedonia
- Coordinates: 41.724428°N 21.157265°E
- Country: North Macedonia
- Region: Southwestern
- Municipality: Makedonski Brod

Population (2002)
  - Total: 189
- Time zone: UTC+1 (CET)
  - Summer (DST): UTC+2 (CEST)

Brest (Macedonian: Брест) is a village located in the region of Porece in the municipality of Makedonski Brod, North Macedonia. It used to be part of the former municipality of Samokov.

== Demographics ==
The village is attested in the 1467/68 Ottoman tax registry (defter) for the Nahiyah of Kırçova. The village had a total of 13 houses, excluding bachelors (mucerred).

According to the 2002 census, the village had a total of 189 inhabitants. Ethnic groups in the village include:

- Macedonians 186
- Serbs 3
