= T.B.W. Stockton =

American Colonel

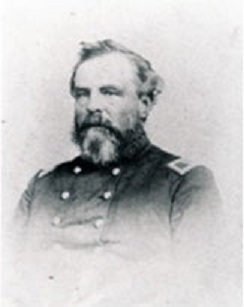
- Born: June 18, 1805; Walton, New York, United States
- Died: December 9, 1890 (aged 85); Flint, Michigan, United States
- Alma mater: United States Military Academy
- Spouse: Maria Garland Smith (m. 1830–1890)
- Children: 1
- Military career
- Allegiance: Union
- Branch: United States Army (Union Army)
- Service years: 1827–1836; 1847–1848; 1861–1863
- Rank: Colonel
- Commands: Regiment of Michigan Volunteers; 16th Michigan Infantry Regiment
- Conflicts: Mexican-American War; American Civil War: Peninsula Campaign; Siege of Yorktown; Battle of Gaines' Mill (POW); Maryland campaign; Battle of Antietam; Fredericksburg campaign; Battle of Fredericksburg; Chancellorsville campaign; Battle of Chancellorsville

Thomas Baylis Whitmarsh Stockton (June 18, 1805 – December 9, 1890) was an American Colonel and Engineer who commanded the 16th Michigan Infantry Regiment during the American Civil War as well as being a major contributor to the infrastructure of Michigan and the original owner of The Stockton House at Flint, Michigan.

== Biography ==
=== Childhood ===
Thomas was born on June 18, 1805, on Walton, New York as the final child of Charles and Elizabeth Stockton however his mother died at childbirth and his father refused to raise him, leaving him adopted by one of his mother's sisters, living with Dr. and Mrs. T. B. Whitmarsh until when Thomas left for the United States Military Academy in 1822.

=== Early military career and engineering ===
Stockton graduated from the military academy in 1827 and was made a Brevet Second Lieutenant and in the next year, he was assigned to Fort Snelling. While stationed there he met Maria Garland Smith who would marry him in 1830 at Prairie du Chien, Michigan Territory. Stockton, though an infantry officer, was renowned for his topographical skills and was a major contributor to the construction of several military roads and bridges in Detroit. While surveying the turnpike between Saginaw to Detroit, he visited Flint, Michigan for the first time. Stockton was also an Assistant Quartermaster from July 11, 1832, to December 31, 1835, serving under Colonel Zachary Taylor before being promoted to First Lieutenant on 1833. Due to Stockton's inheritance of land from his father-in-law in Flint, he resigned from the United States Army in 1836 and became a civil engineer and began improving the harbors at Ohio, Indiana and Michigan as part of the projects on the Great Lakes. Stockton was also competent at diplomacy as he managed to sign a treaty with the Ojibwe in 1837. He left Michigan in 1838 to be first mayor of Michigan City, Indiana until 1839 where he established a permanent residency at Flint.

=== Mexican–American War ===
When the Mexican–American War was ongoing by 1847, Stockton rejoined the United States Army, commanding the 1st Regiment of Michigan Volunteers. The unit would only serve to occupy Córdoba, Veracruz; and Stockton himself would serve as a Military Governor there. When the war ended, he was honorably mustered out and was in civilian life once again.

=== Prelude to the American Civil War ===
Returning home to Flint, Stockton donated 20 acres of his southern portions of his holdings for the upcoming Michigan School for the Deaf and in 1850, Rowland Ferry, John Cage and Stockton formed the Genesee County Agricultural Society to promote agriculture, horticulture, household and mechanical arts within Michigan. In 1852, Stockton, Maria and their son, Baylis, braved the Oregon Trail to join the California Gold Rush although by the time they returned in 1858, neither found any riches although Baylis decided to stay at California. When Stockton returned to Michigan he formed a militia company, the Flint Union Greys, in preparation for the American Civil War.

=== American Civil War ===
Despite Stockton's military experience and militia work the Flint Union Greys were assigned to a unit without Stockton in command. When Stockton personally inquired to Abraham Lincoln about it, Lincoln referred to his Secretary of War and wrote to the latter:

My Dear Sir: I think it is entirely safe to accept a fifth regiment from Michigan, and with your approbation I should say that a regiment presented by Col. T. B. Stockton, ready for service within two weeks from now, will be received. Look at Colonel Stockton’s testimonials.

Stockton raised the new 16th Michigan Infantry Regiment on September 8, 1861, at Flint. The regiment would first see action in the Siege of Yorktown and was soon assigned to the V Corps, as part of the 3rd Brigade of the 1st Division. On June that year, Stockton was captured along with most of his regiment at the Battle of Gaines' Mill. He would be held as a prisoner of war at Libby Prison until he was released in a prisoner exchange in August. By the time of the Battle of Antietam he was in command of the brigade. Stockton would continue to lead it during the Battle of Fredericksburg and the Battle of Chancellorsville before resigning in May 1863 due to his injuries and ill health.

=== Later years ===
When Stockton returned to Flint, he opened up several businesses and began to modernize the downtown district. He would also construct the Stockton House in 1872 which would later become a hospital, a nursing home, and finally a museum and a Michigan Historic Site. Stockton would retire sometime in the 1880s before dying on December 9, 1890.
