= Battle of Peebles' Farm order of battle: Confederate =

The following Confederate States Army units and commanders fought in the Battle of Peebles's Farm from September 30 to October 2, 1864. The Union order of battle is listed separately.

== Abbreviations used ==
=== Military rank ===
- Gen = General
- LTG = Lieutenant General
- MG = Major General
- BG = Brigadier General
- Col = Colonel
- Ltc = Lieutenant Colonel
- Maj = Major
- Cpt = Captain
- Lt = Lieutenant

=== Other ===
- w = wounded
- mw = mortally wounded
- k = killed

== Army of Northern Virginia ==
=== Third Corps ===
LTG A. P. Hill

Division	Brigade	Regiments and Others
Heth's Division; MG Henry Heth	Davis' Brigade BG Joseph R. Davis	1st Confederate Battalion; 2nd Mississippi Infantry; 11th Mississippi; 26th Mississippi Infantry; 42nd Mississippi Infantry
Heth's Division; MG Henry Heth	Cooke's Brigade BG John Rogers Cooke	15th North Carolina Infantry; 27th North Carolina Infantry; 46th North Carolina Infantry; 48th North Carolina Infantry; 55th North Carolina Infantry
Heth's Division; MG Henry Heth	MacRae's Brigade BG William MacRae	11th North Carolina Infantry; 26th North Carolina Infantry; 44th North Carolina Infantry; 47th North Carolina Infantry; 52nd North Carolina Infantry
Heth's Division; MG Henry Heth	Archer's & H.H. Walker's Brigades Col R. M. Mayo	13th Alabama Infantry; 1st Tennessee Infantry (Provisional Army); 7th Tennessee Infantry; 14th Tennessee Infantry; 2nd Maryland Infantry Battalion; 40th Virginia Infantry; 47th Virginia Infantry; 55th Virginia Infantry; 22nd Virginia Infantry Battalion
Heth's Division; MG Henry Heth	Johnson's Brigade Col William McComb	17th/23rd Tennessee Infantry; 25th/44th Tennessee Infantry; 63rd Tennessee Infantry
Wilcox's Division; MG Cadmus M. Wilcox	Lane's Brigade BG James H. Lane	7th North Carolina Infantry; 18th North Carolina Infantry; 28th North Carolina Infantry; 33rd North Carolina Infantry; 37th North Carolina Infantry
Wilcox's Division; MG Cadmus M. Wilcox	Scales' Brigade BG Alfred M. Scales	13th North Carolina Infantry; 16th North Carolina Infantry; 22nd North Carolina Infantry; 34th North Carolina Infantry; 38th North Carolina Infantry
Wilcox's Division; MG Cadmus M. Wilcox	McGowan's Brigade BG Samuel McGowan	1st South Carolina Infantry (Provisional Army); 1st South Carolina Infantry (Orr's Rifles); 12th South Carolina Infantry; 13th South Carolina Infantry; 14th South Carolina Infantry
Wilcox's Division; MG Cadmus M. Wilcox	Thomas's Brigade BG Edward L. Thomas	14th Georgia Infantry; 35th Georgia Infantry; 45th Georgia Infantry; 49th Georgia Infantry

=== Cavalry Corps ===
MG Wade Hampton III

Division	Brigade	Regiments and Others
W.H.F. Lee's Division; MG W.H.F. Lee	Barringer's Brigade BG Rufus Barringer	1st North Carolina Cavalry; 2nd North Carolina Cavalry; 3rd North Carolina Cavalry; 5th North Carolina Cavalry
W.H.F. Lee's Division; MG W.H.F. Lee	Beale's Brigade BG Richard L. T. Beale	9th Virginia Cavalry; 10th Virginia Cavalry; 13th Virginia Cavalry
W.H.F. Lee's Division; MG W.H.F. Lee	Dearing's Brigade BG James Dearing	8th Georgia Cavalry; 4th North Carolina Cavalry; 16th North Carolina Cavalry
Butler's Division; MG Matthew Calbraith Butler	Butler's Brigade Col H. K. Aiken	4th South Carolina Cavalry; 5th South Carolina Cavalry; 6th South Carolina Cavalry
Butler's Division; MG Matthew Calbraith Butler	Young's Brigade Col J.F. Waring	10th Georgia Cavalry; Cobb's (Georgia) Legion; Phillip's (Georgia) Legion; Jeff. Davis (Mississippi) Legion

== Sources ==
- Katcher, Philip R.N. The Army of Northern Virginia: Lee's Army in the American Civil War, 1861-1865. London, United Kingdom: Fitzroy Dearborn, 2003. ISBN 1-57958-331-8.
