= 57th Pennsylvania Infantry Regiment =

Union Army infantry regiment

57th Regiment Pennsylvania Volunteer Infantry
- Active: October 1861 – June 29, 1865
- Country: United States of America
- Allegiance: Union
- Branch: Infantry
- Engagements: Siege of Yorktown; Battle of Williamsburg; Battle of Seven Pines; Seven Days Battles; Battle of Groveton; Second Battle of Bull Run; Battle of Chantilly; Battle of Fredericksburg; Battle of Chancellorsville; Battle of Gettysburg; Bristoe Campaign; Mine Run Campaign; Battle of the Wilderness; Battle of Spotsylvania Court House; Battle of Cold Harbor; Siege of Petersburg; First Battle of Deep Bottom; Second Battle of Deep Bottom; Second Battle of Ream's Station; Battle of Peebles' Farm; Battle of Boydton Plank Road; Battle of Hatcher's Run; Battle of Fort Stedman; Battle of Sailor's Creek; Appomattox Campaign

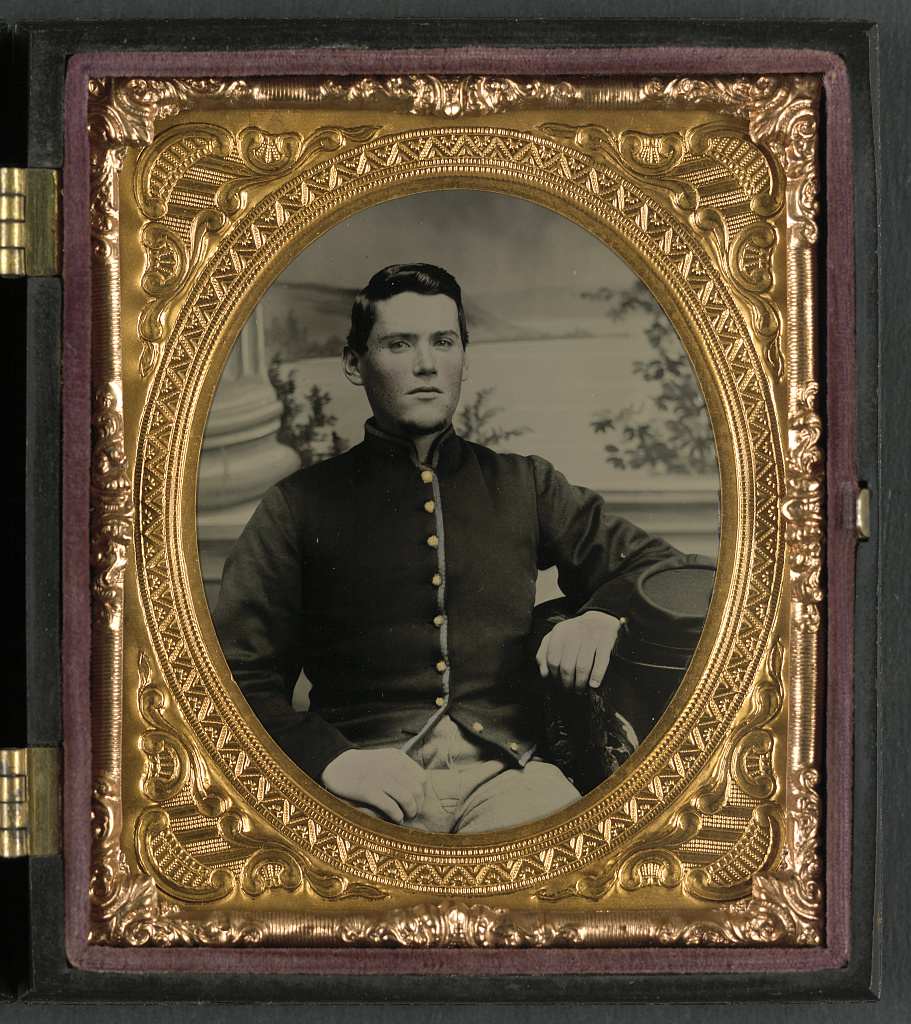
Private Jonathan Colgrove of Co. F, 57th Pennsylvania Infantry Regiment, in uniform

The 57th Regiment Pennsylvania Volunteer Infantry was an infantry regiment that served in the Union Army during the American Civil War.

== Service ==
The 57th Pennsylvania Infantry was organized at Harrisburg, Pennsylvania, beginning October 1861, as follows: Company A, Susquehanna County and Wyoming Counties, Captain Peter Sides; Company B, Bradford County and Mercer Counties, Captain Samuel C. Simonton; Company C, Allegheny County and Mercer Counties, Captain Jerome B. Hoagland; Company D, Tioga County, Captain H.W. Caulking; Company E, Allegheny and Mercer Counties, Captain James B. Moore; Company F, Mercer County, Captain Ralph Maxwell; Company G, Bradford County, Captain George S. Peck; Company H, Bradford County, Captain John Griffin; Company I, Mercer and Venango Counties, Captain Thomas S. Strohecker; Company K, Titusville, Crawford County, Captain Cornelius S. Chase. (Company K had been recruited as a company of independent sharpshooters but instead joined the 57th Pennsylvania.)

On December 14, 1861, the regiment was mustered in for a three-year enlistment under the command of Colonel William Maxwell. It was attached to Jameson's Brigade, Heintzelman's Division, Army of the Potomac, to March 1862, when Maxwell was relieved of his duties and Colonel Charles Thomas Campbell (later brigadier general) was appointed to command the regiment. 1st Brigade, 3rd Division, III Corps, Army of the Potomac, to August 1862. 2nd Brigade, 1st Division, III Corps, Army of the Potomac, to March 1863. 1st Brigade, 1st Division, III Corps, to March 1864. 2nd Brigade, 3rd Division, II Corps, to June 1865.

The 57th Pennsylvania Infantry reenlisted at the end of 1863, earning the right to be called “Veteran Volunteers.” The regiment was mustered out June 29, 1865.

== Detailed service ==
- Left Pennsylvania for Washington, D.C., December 14, 1861.
- Duty in the defenses of Washington, D.C., until March 1862
- Moved to the Virginia Peninsula March 16–18
- Siege of Yorktown April 5-May 4
- Skirmish Yorktown April 11
- Battle of Williamsburg May 5
- Battle of Fair Oaks, Seven Pines, May 31-June 1
- Seven Days before Richmond June 25-July 1:
  - Oak Grove June 25
  - Peach Orchard and Savage Station June 29
  - Charles City Cross Roads and Glendale June 30
  - Malvern Hill July 1
- Duty at Harrison's Landing until August 16
- Movement to Centreville August 16–26
- Skirmish at Bull Run August 20
- Pope's Campaign in northern Virginia:
  - Battle of Gainesville August 28
  - Battle of Groveton August 29
  - Second Battle of Bull Run August 30
  - Battle of Chantilly September 1
- Guard fords from Monocacy River to Conrad's Ferry until October
- Marched up the Potomac to Leesburg, then to Falmouth, Va., October 11-November 19
- Battle of Fredericksburg, December 12–15
- Burnside's 2nd Campaign, "Mud March," January 20–24, 1863
- At Falmouth, Va., until April 27
- Chancellorsville Campaign April 27-May 6:
  - Battle of Chancellorsville May 1–5
- Gettysburg Campaign June 11-July 24:
  - Battle of Gettysburg, July 1–3
  - Pursuit of Lee July 5–24
  - Whapping Heights, Va., July 23
- Duty on line of the Rappahannock until October
- Bristoe Campaign October 9–22:
  - Auburn and Bristoe October 13–14
- Advance to line of the Rappahannock November 7–8:
  - Kelly's Ford November 7
- Mine Run Campaign November 26-December 2:
  - Payne's Farm November 27
- Veterans on furlough January to March 1864
- Rapidan Campaign May 4-June 12:
  - Battles of the Wilderness May 5–7
  - Laurel Hill May 8
  - Spotsylvania May 8–12
  - Po River May 10
  - Spotsylvania Court House May 12–21:
    - Assault on the Salient May 12
    - Harris' Farm May 19
  - North Anna River May 23–26
  - Line of the Pamunkey May 26–28
  - Totopotomoy May 28–31
  - Cold Harbor June 1–12
- Before Petersburg June 16–18
- Siege of Petersburg June 16, 1864, to April 2, 1865:
  - Weldon Railroad June 22–23, 1864
  - Demonstration north of the James River at Deep Bottom July 27–29 and August 13–20:
    - Strawberry Plains, Deep Bottom, August 14–18
  - Ream's Station August 25
  - Poplar Springs Church September 29-October 2
  - Boydton Plank Road, Hatcher's Run, October 27–28
  - Expedition to Weldon Railroad December 7–12
  - Consolidated to five companies January 11, 1865
  - Dabney's Mills, Hatcher's Run, February 5–7
  - Appomattox Campaign March 28-April 9:
    - Boydton Road March 30–31
    - Fall of Petersburg April 2
- Sailor's Creek April 6
- High Bridge, Farmville, April 7
- Appomattox Courthouse April 9
- Surrender of Lee and his army
- At Burkesville until May
- March to Washington D.C., May 2–12
- Grand Review of the Armies May 23
- Duty at Alexandria until June.

== Casualties ==
The regiment lost a total of 378 men during service; 12 officers and 149 enlisted men killed or mortally wounded, 217 enlisted men died of disease. Pvt James M Bush was severely wounded in the right forearm on May 6, 1864 at the Wilderness, Virginia and died at Washington DC of wounds received. He is buried at Arlington National Cemetery.

== Commanders ==
- Colonel William Maxwell — resigned February 22, 1862
- Colonel Charles Thomas Campbell - promoted to brigadier general November 29, 1862
- Colonel Peter Sides — wounded in action at Gettysburg, July 2, 1863; wounded again in action at the Battle of the Wilderness and discharged due to disability November 28, 1864
- Colonel George Zinn
- Captain Alanson H. Nelson — commanded at the Battle of Gettysburg after Col Sides was wounded

== Notable members ==
- Private Francis A. Bishop, Company C - Medal of Honor recipient for action at the Battle of Spotsylvania Court House
- Private Lewis F. Brest, Company D — Medal of Honor recipient for action at the Battle of Sailor's Creek

== See also ==
- List of Pennsylvania Civil War Units
- Pennsylvania in the Civil War
