= 140th New York Infantry Regiment =

- Active: September 13, 1862 - June 3, 1865
- Country: United States
- Allegiance: Union
- Type: Infantry
- Size: 1,707
- Nickname(s): 'Rochester Racehorses'
- Engagements: Battle of Fredericksburg Battle of Chancellorsville; Battle of Gettysburg; Battle of the Wilderness; Battle of Spotsylvania Court House; Battle of Totopotomoy; Battle of Cold Harbor; Siege of Petersburg; Battle of Weldon Railroad; Battle of Hatcher's Run Appomattox Campaign

Commanders
- Notable commanders: Colonel Patrick H. O'Rorke †

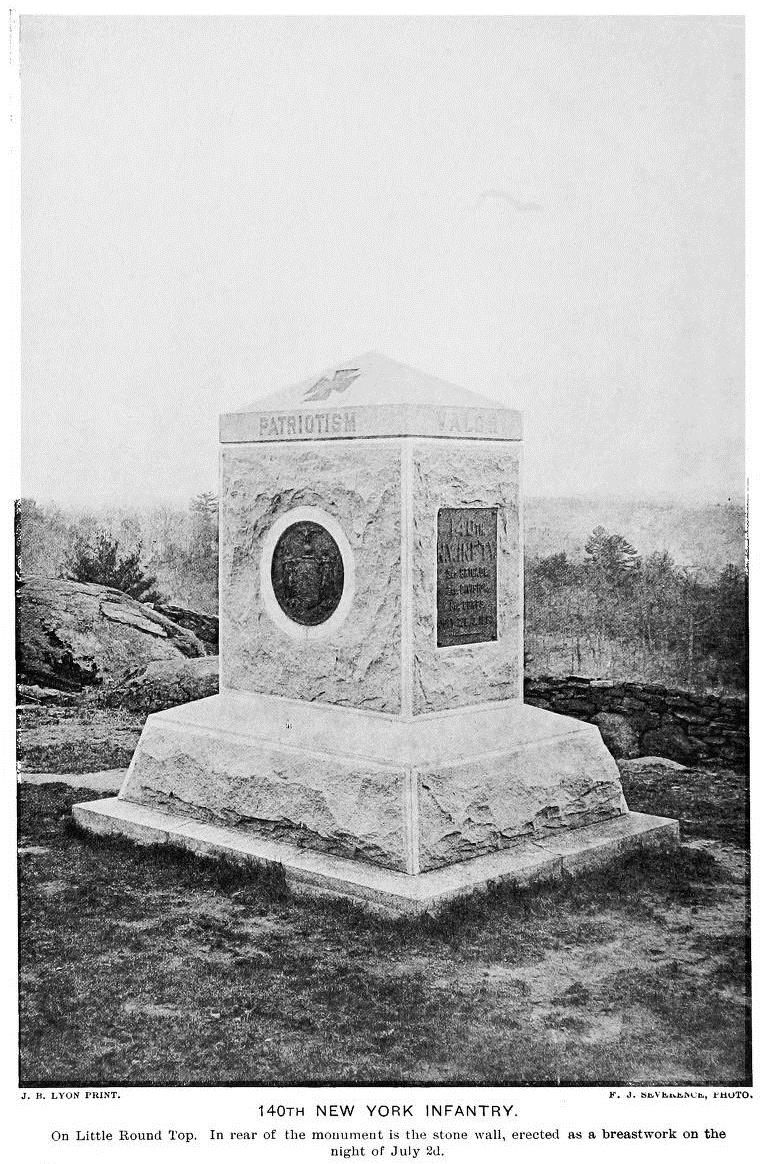
140th New York Infantry Monument, Gettysburg Battlefield

The 140th New York Infantry Regiment was a volunteer infantry regiment that was created on September 13, 1862, for the Union Army during the American Civil War. From January 1864 they wore a Zouave uniform.

== Formation ==
On August 8, 1862, Captain Hiram Smith received authority to form the infantry regiment. The 140th New York Volunteer Infantry Regiment was organized in Rochester, New York and mustered in for three years service on September 13, 1862.

During the American Civil War a Union Army regiment ideally comprised 10 infantry companies. Each company had 100 men for a full regimental strength of 1000 men. The 10 companies of the 140th New York Volunteer Regiment were all recruited from Rochester, New York and the surrounding towns and villages of Monroe County, New York.

A company breakdown with captain and source of volunteers is noted below:

- Company A - Captain Milo Starks - Brockport
- Company B - Captain Christian Spies -Rochester
- Company C - Captain William James Clark - Rochester
- Company D - Captain Elwell Stephen Otis - Rochester, Brighton, Gates, Penfield, and West Webster
- Company E - Captain Monroe H Hollister - Rochester
- Company F - Captain Benjamin F Harmon - Rochester
- Company G - Captain Perry B Sibley - Rochester and Churchville
- Company H - Captain W. S. Grantsyne - Rochester, Brockport and Fairport
- Company I - Captain William F. Campbell - Chili, Greece, Penfield, Rochester, Ogden, Henrietta and Parma
- Company K - Captain Patrick J. Dowling - Rochester

The 140th New York Volunteer Infantry Regiment organized and drilled at Camp Fitz-John Porter on the western bank of the Genesee River in Rochester, NY. Camp Fitz-John Porter was also the mustering location for the 108th New York Volunteer Infantry Regiment, and Mack's 18th New York Independent Artillery Battery.

=== Initial Command ===
- Colonel - Patrick H. O'Rorke, West Point Military Academy, Graduated 1st in class, June 1861.
- Lieutenant Colonel - Louis Ernst
- Major - Isaiah Force

== Detailed Service ==
=== 1862 ===
==== Washington DC Defense and Fredericksburg ====
The 140th NY left Rochester by train on September 19, 1862, en route to Washington DC after brief stops in Auburn, NY and Elmira, NY for fitting out and supply. The regiment first served in the Provisional Brigade, Casey's Division in the defensive fortifications around Washington, DC.

The 140th NY was then transferred to the XII Corps, 2nd Division, 2nd Brigade of the Army of the Potomac by October 1862.

In November, 1862 the regiment was reassigned to the V Corps, 2nd Division, 3rd Brigade of the Army of the Potomac. From then on the 140th NY would remain with the V Corps of the Army of the Potomac and see action in, or be present in reserve at most of the major campaigns and engagements in the Eastern Theater of the American Civil War until cessation of hostilities.

The 140th NY first saw combat between December 12–15, 1862 at the Battle of Fredericksburg. After Fredericksburg, the regiment camped through December at Falmouth, VA.

=== 1863 ===
==== Chancelorville and Reinforcement ====
The regiment participated in the Chancellorsville Campaign (April 27-May 6, 1863) seeing limited action at the Battle of Chancellorsville (May 1–5). Losses at Chancellorsville were 21 total casualties (killed, wounded, missing or captured).

In June, 1863 the three years men of the 13th New York Volunteer Infantry Regiment were transferred to the 140th NY to replace losses.

==== The Battle of Gettysburg ====
The regiment participated in the Gettysburg Campaign of June 11-July 24. It would engage in its first heavy action of the war during the crucial battle for Little Round Top at the Battle of Gettysburg on July 2, 1863. General Gouverneur K. Warren was putting together a desperate improvised defense of Little Round Top, which was protecting the Union Army's left flank. General Warren intercepted the 140th New York as it marched on the north slope of Little Round Top en route to support Sickle's III Corps in the wheatfields. General Warren requested the 140th New York assist reinforcing Vincent's 16th Michigan Volunteer Infantry which was decimated and under heavy fire on the hill. O'Rorke and his men obliged. Contemporary accounts note that Colonel Patrick "Paddy" O'Rorke, led the way with sword drawn and shouting, "Down this way, boys!". Without having time to load their weapons A Company and G Company filled in the right flank gap of the 5th Maine. O'Rorke shouted, "Here they are men, commence firing!". The 140th New York charged over the hill pushing back the 4th Texas Infantry and 5th Texas Infantry Regiments of the Texas Brigade. Although the 140th New York was successful in assisting the defense of the Little Round Top, it cost the regiment 133 total casualties. Colonel O'Rorke was among the dead, having suffered multiple bullet hits. A marker commemorates the losses the 140th NY endured, including Col. O'Rorke, on Little Round Top at the Gettysburg battleground museum.

"Col. O'Rorke was killed at Gettysburg while leading his men into action on Little Round Top, where their prompt action aided largely in seizing that important position - Colonel Fox."

==== Remainder of 1863 ====
Following Gettysburg the 140th was present at the Bristoe Station Campaign, Second Battle of Rappahannock Station, and the Mine Run campaign to close out 1863, but were held in reserve or not involved in major action.

=== 1864 ===
==== Volunteers as Zouave ====
In January 1864 during winter camp at Beverly Ford, VA the regiment was outfitted as Zouaves. These flamboyant uniforms were patterned after elite French army units which had earned military glory in the 1850s, and they were awarded to the 140th NY in recognition of the regiment's seamless record.

In March 1864 the 140th NY was transferred to V Corps, 1st Division, 4th Brigade, Army of the Potomac. An additional transfer followed in April 1864 when the regiment joined the 5th Corps, 1st Division, 1st Brigade of the Army of the Potomac.

==== The Overland Campaign ====
In March 1864 General Grant assumed command of all Federal forces and began the Overland Campaign, a relentless push through Virginia toward the Confederacy's capitol of Richmond, VA throughout that summer. The 140th New York participated in the Campaign from the Rapidan to the James Rivers. The course of this campaign included action in some of the most bloody and devastating battles of American Civil War including the Battle of the Wilderness, Battle of Spotsylvania Court House and Cold Harbor. In the 39 days between May 5 and June 2 the 140th would incur 384 total dead, wounded, missing or captured.

===== Bloodletting at the Battle of the Wilderness and Spotsylvania Courthouse =====
The heaviest losses the 140th New York would incur in a single battle were incurred during severe fighting in the Battle of the Wilderness between May 5–7, 1864. The 529 soldiers of the 140th NY led the opening of the battle with a charge across Saunders Field, and were among the first Union troops to engage the Confederacy in battle. The 140th took unsupported flank fire for over 30 minutes and sustained 255 total casualties. Estimates of exact losses are 50 enlisted men, and 3 officers killed in action or died of wounds sustained during battle. A further 98 enlisted and 3 officers injured. 101 total personnel were reported missing or captured. Captain Willard Abbott was counted among the wounded.

"The Regiment melted away like snow. Men disappeared as if the earth had swallowed them up." - Captain Porter Farley.

Just three days later (May 8, 1864) the 140th was involved in heavy combat during the Battle of Spotsylvania Court House, participating in battle at Piney Branch Church, and Laurel Hill. The regiment suffered 60 additional casualties in total during the Battles of Spotsylvania Court House. Among the dead were Colonel George E. Ryan and Major Milo L. Starks, killed in battle at Laurel Hill

===== North Anna, Totopotomoy Creek and Cold Harbor =====
Further Actions in May 1864 included the reserve duty at the Assault on the Salient, Battle of North Anna River, and light action at the Battle of Totopotomoy, where Captain William Grantsyne was injured.

Heavy action continued in The Battle of Cold Harbor (Bethesda Church), where the 140th New York sustained an additional 60 total casualties.

===== Siege of Petersburg and Reinforcement =====
In June, 1864 the 140th New York was transferred to V Corps, 2nd Division, 1st Brigade during the Siege of Petersburg. The regiment participated in first assault during the siege of Petersburg sustaining 22 total casualties, including Captain Benjamin Harmon among the wounded.

Throughout the summer and fall of 1864 the 140th New York Regiment participated in Battle of Weldon Railroad and Poplar Spring Church, where Lt. Colonel Elswell Otis was injured.

Reinforcements arrived in October, 1864 as members of the 44th New York Volunteer Infantry Regiment, not mustered out or assigned to other regiments were transferred into the 140th New York.

=== 1865 ===
January 25, 1865 saw many officer promotions to fill the leadership ranks lost due to casualty from the 1864 campaign. Lieutenant Colonel Grantsyne was promoted to colonel, Major W. James Clark to lieutenant colonel and Captain Willard Abbott to major.

Throughout 1865 the 140th New York was present or active in The Battle of Hatcher's Run, and participated in the Appomattox Campaign to close out the war.

From May 1–12 the 140th New York marched to Washington DC, and participated in the Grand Review of May 23, 1865.

=== Mustering Out ===
On June 3, 1865, the 140th Regiment was mustered out near Alexandria, VA under the command of Colonel W.S. Grantsyne, and Lieutenant Colonel W. James Clark. The men not to be mustered out with the regiment were transferred to the 5th New York Veteran Infantry. It is estimated fewer than 245 of the original 1000 men called to arms as the 140th New York Volunteers of Monroe County, NY answered its final call to muster.

== Total Casualties ==
Total war time enrollment for the 140th Regiment was 1,707 men. Available records vary but indicate that 736 men were casualties (killed, injured, missing or captured) due directly to combat. Among them 132 enlisted and 8 officers dead in action or of wounds sustained in action, 304 enlisted and 13 officers injured, and 275 enlisted and 7 officers missing or captured. Disease claimed an additional 168 enlisted and 2 officers. An estimated 77 men died as Confederate prisoners of war, many at Andersonville Prison.

== Leaders ==
Name	Highest Rank	From	To	Result	Notes
Patrick O'Rorke	Colonel	9/13/1862	7/2/1863 †	KIA Gettysburg	West Point June 1861
George E. Ryan	Colonel	7/17/1863	5/8/1864 †	KIA Spotsylvania Court House (Laurel Hill)	West Point 1857 Served as Assistant Adjutant General on the Staff of General Sykes V Corps prior to assignment to the 140th Mustered in with rank of Colonel 7/17/1863
William S. Grantsyne	Colonel	1/25/1865	6/3/1865		Wounded at Totopotomoy May 1864 Promoted from Captain Company H to Lt. Colonel on 11/15/1864 with rank as of 8/8/1864 Promoted to Colonel 1/25/1865 Colonel of 140th New York during Grand Review and unmuster of 140th New York on 6/3/1865
Louis Ernst	Lt. Colonel	9/13/1862	8/15/1863	Resigned Commission	Lt. Colonel at formation 9/1862 Acting Colonel between Gettysburg and the appointment of Col. Ryan
Isaiah F. Force	Lt. Colonel	8/15/1863	11/6/1863	Discharged due to disability	Major at formation 9/13/1862 Promoted to Lt. Colonel 8/15/1863 but not mustered
Elwell Stephen Otis	Lt. Colonel	11/6/1863	Fall 1864	Discharged due to injury. Would return to military duty after the war	Promoted from Captain Company D to Lt. Colonel with rank on 11/23/1863 as of 11/6/1863 Wounded at Poplar Springs Church Sept-Oct 1864
W. James Clark	Lt. Colonel	1/25/1865			Promoted from Captain Company C to Major 9/22/1864 Promoted to Lt. Colonel 1/25/1865
Milo S. Starks	Major	8/15/1863	5/8/1864 †	KIA Spotsylvania Court House (Laurel Hill)	Injured at Gettysburg Promoted from Captain Company A to Major with rank 11/17/1863 as of 8/15/1863
Willard Abbott	Major	1/25/1865	6/3/1865		Captain Company H of the 13th New York Mustered in as Captain Company G NY 140th 10/19/1863 Wounded at The Battle of the Wilderness 5/5/1864 Promoted to Major 1/25/1865

== Notable Members ==
- Sergeant Robert F. Shipley - won the Medal of Honor for capturing the flag of the 9th Virginia Infantry (C.S.A.) in hand-to-hand combat at the Battle of Five Forks, VA.

== Memorials ==
- Monument to the New York 140th Infantry at Little Round Top at Gettysburg, PA 39°47′29.2″N 77°14′13.3″W
- Monument to the 140th New York Infantry at The Wilderness Battlefield Exhibit, VA
