= First Battle of Deep Bottom order of battle: Union =

The following Union Army units and commanders fought in the First Battle of Deep Bottom (July 27–29, 1864) of the American Civil War. The Confederate order of battle is listed separately.

== Abbreviations used ==
=== Military Rank ===
- LTG = Lieutenant General
- MG = Major General
- BG = Brigadier General
- Col = Colonel
- Ltc = Lieutenant Colonel
- Maj = Major
- Cpt = Captain
- Lt = Lieutenant

=== Other ===
- w = wounded
- mw = mortally wounded
- k = killed
- c = captured

== Union Forces ==
=== General in Chief ===
LTG Ulysses S. Grant

=== Army of the Potomac ===
MG George Meade

==== II Corps ====
MG Winfield Scott Hancock

Escort:

- 1st Vermont Cavalry, Company M: Cpt John H. Hazelton

Engineers:

- 1st Battalion, New York Infantry: Maj Wesley Brainerd

Chief of Artillery: Col John C. Tidball

Division	Brigade	Regiments and Others
First Division; BG Francis C. Barlow until 29 July; BG Nelson A. Miles	1st Brigade BG Nelson A. Miles until July 29; Col James C. Lynch	28th Massachusetts: Maj James Flemming; 26th Michigan: Cpt Lucius H. Ives; 5th New Hampshire: Maj James E. Larkin; 61st New York: Maj George W. Scott; 81st Pennsylvania: Ltc William Wilson; 140th Pennsylvania: Cpt Thomas Henry; 183rd Pennsylvania: Ltc George T. Egbert; 2nd New York Heavy Artillery: Maj George Hogg
First Division; BG Francis C. Barlow until 29 July; BG Nelson A. Miles	Consolidated Brigade Col Clinton D. MacDougall	39th New York: Cpt David A. Allen; 52nd New York: Cpt George Degener; 57th New York: Cpt L. Hart Wilder; 63rd New York (6 companies): Cpt Alexander Watts; 69th New York (6 companies): Cpt Albert Gosse; 88th New York: Ltc Denis F. Burke; 111th New York: Cpt Marcus W. Murdock; 125th New York: Cpt Nelson Penfield; 126th New York: Cpt John B. Geddis
First Division; BG Francis C. Barlow until 29 July; BG Nelson A. Miles	4th Brigade Ltc Knut Oscar Broady	2nd Delaware (5 companies): 64th New York: Ltc William Glenny; 66th New York: Cpt Nathaniel P. Lane; 53rd Pennsylvania: Cpt Philip H. Schreyer; 145th Pennsylvania: Cpt James H. Hamlin; 148th Pennsylvania: Cpt Alfred A. Rhinehart; 7th New York Heavy Artillery: Ltc Joseph H. Murphy; 116th Pennsylvania: Cpt David W. Megraw
Second Division; MG John Gibbon Provost guard: 2nd Company Minnesota Sharpshooters: Cpt Mahlon Black	1st Brigade Ltc Francis E. Pierce	19th Maine: Cpt Joseph W. Spaulding; 15th Massachusetts: Maj Isaac Harris Hooper; 19th Massachusetts: 20th Massachusetts: 1st Company Massachusetts Sharpshooters: 7th Michigan: 1st Minnesota Battalion (2 companies): Cpt James C. Farwell; 42nd New York: 59th New York: 82nd New York: 184th Pennsylvania: 36th Wisconsin:
Second Division; MG John Gibbon Provost guard: 2nd Company Minnesota Sharpshooters: Cpt Mahlon Black	2nd Brigade Col Mathew Murphy	8th New York Heavy Artillery: Maj Erastus M. Spaulding; 155th New York: Maj John Byrne; 164th New York: Maj John Beattie; 170th New York: Cpt John Coonan; 182nd New York Heavy Artillery: Col Mathew Murphy
Second Division; MG John Gibbon Provost guard: 2nd Company Minnesota Sharpshooters: Cpt Mahlon Black	3rd Brigade Col Thomas A. Smyth	14th Connecticut: Cpt John C. Broatch; 1st Delaware: 12th New Jersey: 10th New York (6 companies): 108th New York: 8th Ohio: 69th Pennsylvania: Cpt Patrick S. Tinen; 106th Pennsylvania: Cpt John B. Breitenbach; 7th West Virginia:
Third Division; BG Gershom Mott	1st Brigade BG Régis de Trobriand	20th Indiana: 17th Maine: 40th New York: Cpt Madison M. Cannon; 73rd New York: Ltc Michael W. Burns; 86th New York: 124th New York: 99th Pennsylvania: Col Edwin Ruthwin Biles; 110th Pennsylvania: 2nd U.S. Sharpshooters: 4th New York Heavy Artillery (5 companies): Maj Frank Williams
Third Division; BG Gershom Mott	2nd Brigade Col Daniel Chaplin (until July 28); Col Henry J. Madill (July 28)	5th Michigan: Col John Pulford; 93rd New York: Maj Samuel McConihe; 57th Pennsylvania: Ltc William B. Neeper; 63rd Pennsylvania: 105th Pennsylvania: Cpt John C. Conser; 141st Pennsylvania: Col Henry J. Madill; 1st U.S. Sharpshooters: Cpt John Wilson; 1st Massachusetts Heavy Artillery: Maj Nathaniel Shatswell; 1st Maine Heavy Artillery: Ltc Thomas H. Talbot [transferred to 1st Brigade, July 28]
Third Division; BG Gershom Mott	3rd Brigade Col Robert McAllister	16th Massachusetts: 5th New Jersey: Cpt Thomas C. Godfrey; 6th New Jersey: 7th New Jersey: Cpt Thomas C. Thompson; 8th New Jersey: Maj Virgil M. Healy; 11th New Jersey: Col Robert McAllister, Ltc John Schoonover (from July 30)
Third Division; BG Gershom Mott	4th Brigade Col William R. Brewster	11th Massachusetts (5 companies): Col William Blaisdell; 71st New York: 72nd New York (3 companies): 74th New York: 84th Pennsylvania: Ltc George Zinn
Third Division; BG Gershom Mott	Artillery Brigade Maj John G. Hazard	6th Maine Light: Cpt Edwin B. Dow; 10th Battery, Massachusetts Light: Cpt Henry J. Sleeper; 1st Battery, New Hampshire Light: Cpt Frederick M. Edgell; Battery B, 1st New Jersey Light: Cpt A. Judson Clark; 3rd Battery, New Jersey Light: Cpt Christian Woerner; 4th New York Heavy: Cpt John B. Vande Wieler; Battery G, 1st New York Light: Cpt Nelson Ames; 11th Battery, New York Light: Cpt John E. Burton; 12th Battery, New York Light: Cpt George F. McKnight; Battery F, 1st Pennsylvania Light: Cpt R. Bruce Ricketts; Battery A, 1st Rhode Island Light: Lt William S. Perrin; Battery B, 1st Rhode Island Light: Cpt Thomas Frederick Brown; Battery K, 4th U.S.: Cpt John W. Roder; Battery C, 5th U.S.: Battery I, 5th U.S.:

==== Cavalry Corps ====
MG Philip Sheridan

Division	Brigade	Regiments and Others
First Division; BG Alfred T. A. Torbert	1st Brigade (Wolverine Brigade) k-0, w-0, m-0 = 0 BG George A. Custer	1st Michigan; 5th Michigan; 6th Michigan; 7th Michigan
First Division; BG Alfred T. A. Torbert	2nd Brigade k-3, w-12, m-0 = 15 Col Thomas C. Devin	4th New York; 6th New York; 9th New York; 17th Pennsylvania; 2nd U.S. Artillery, Batteries B and L
First Division; BG Alfred T. A. Torbert	Reserve Brigade k-7, w-48, m-5 = 60 BG Wesley Merritt	19th New York (1st Dragoon); 6th Pennsylvania; 1st Rhode Island, detachment; 1st United States; 2nd United States; 5th United States; 2nd U.S. Artillery, Battery D
Second Cavalry Division; BG David McMurtrie Gregg	1st Brigade BG Henry Eugene Davies	1st Massachusetts Cavalry: 1st New Jersey Cavalry: 10th New York Cavalry: 6th Ohio Cavalry: Col William Stedman; 1st Pennsylvania Cavalry:
Second Cavalry Division; BG David McMurtrie Gregg	2nd Brigade Col John Irvin Gregg	1st Maine Cavalry: 2nd Pennsylvania Cavalry: 4th Pennsylvania Cavalry: 8th Pennsylvania Cavalry: 13th Pennsylvania Cavalry: 16th Pennsylvania Cavalry:

=== Army of the James ===
MG Benjamin F. Butler

==== X Corps ====
Division	Brigade	Regiments and Others
First Division	3rd Brigade BG Robert Sanford Foster	10th Connecticut: Col John L. Otis; 11th Maine: Maj Jonathan A. Hill; 1st Maryland Cavalry (dismounted): 24th Massachusetts: Col Francis A. Osborn; 100th New York:

==== XIX Corps ====
Division	Brigade	Regiments and Others
Second Division	1st Brigade BG Henry Warner Birge	9th Connecticut: 12th Maine: 14th Maine: 26th Massachusetts: 14th New Hampshire: 75th New York:

==== Cavalry ====
Division	Brigade	Regiments and Others
Cavalry Division; BG August Kautz	1st Brigade Col Robert M. West	3rd New York Cavalry: Cpt John M. Wilson; 5th Pennsylvania Cavalry (detachment): Col Robert M. West
Cavalry Division; BG August Kautz	2nd Brigade Col Samuel P. Spear	1st District of Columbia Cavalry: Maj J. Stannard Baker; 11th Pennsylvania Cavalry (detachment):
Cavalry Division; BG August Kautz	Unassigned	4th Massachusetts Cavalry, Company F: 4th Massachusetts Cavalry, Company G: 1st New York Mounted Rifles:
Cavalry Division; BG August Kautz	Artillery	4th Wisconsin Battery (1st section): Cpt George B. Easterly; 4th Wisconsin Battery (2nd section): Lt William P. Powers

=== Naval forces ===
- USS Mendota: Commander Edward T. Nichols

== See also ==
- Virginia in the American Civil War
- Siege of Petersburg
