= Battle of Deep Bottom order of battle =

Battle of Deep Bottom order of battle may refer to:

- First Battle of Deep Bottom order of battle
- Second Battle of Deep Bottom order of battle

== See also ==
- Battle of Deep Bottom (disambiguation)
