= Second Battle of Deep Bottom order of battle: Confederate =

The following Confederate army units and commanders fought in the Second Battle of Deep Bottom from August 14 to 20, 1864 of the American Civil War. The Union order of battle is listed separately

== Abbreviations used ==
=== Military rank ===
- Gen = General
- LTG = Lieutenant General
- MG = Major General
- BG = Brigadier General
- Col = Colonel
- Ltc = Lieutenant Colonel

=== Other ===
- (w) = wounded
- (mw) = mortally wounded
- (k) = killed in action
- (c) = captured

== Army of Northern Virginia ==
Gen Robert E. Lee

=== Infantry forces ===
| Division | Brigade | Regiments and Others |
|---|---|---|
| Field's Division, First Corps; MG Charles W. Field | Anderson's Brigade BG George T. Anderson | 7th Georgia Infantry; 8th Georgia Infantry; 9th Georgia Infantry; 11th Georgia Infantry; 59th Georgia Infantry |
| Field's Division, First Corps; MG Charles W. Field | Law's Brigade Col William F. Perry | 4th Alabama Infantry; 15th Alabama Infantry; 44th Alabama Infantry; 47th Alabama Infantry; 48th Alabama Infantry |
| Field's Division, First Corps; MG Charles W. Field | Gregg's Brigade BG John Gregg | 3rd Arkansas Infantry; 1st Texas Infantry; 4th Texas Infantry; 5th Texas Infantry |
| Field's Division, First Corps; MG Charles W. Field | Benning's Brigade Col. Dudley M. DuBose | 2nd Georgia Infantry; 15th Georgia Infantry; 17th Georgia Infantry; 20th Georgia Infantry |
| Field's Division, First Corps; MG Charles W. Field | Bratton's Brigade BG John Bratton | 1st South Carolina Infantry; 5th South Carolina Infantry; 6th South Carolina Infantry; 2nd South Carolina Rifles |
| From Third Corps | Lane's Brigade, Wilcox's Division BG James H. Lane | 7th North Carolina Infantry; 18th North Carolina Infantry; 28th North Carolina Infantry; 33rd North Carolina Infantry; 37th North Carolina Infantry |
| From Third Corps | McGowan's Brigade, Wilcox's Division BG Samuel McGowan | 1st South Carolina Infantry (Provisional Army); 1st South Carolina Rifles; 12th South Carolina Infantry; 13th South Carolina Infantry; 14th South Carolina Infantry |
| From Third Corps | Ambrose R. Wright's Brigade, Mahone's Division BG Victor Girardey (k); Col William Gibson | 3rd Georgia Infantry; 22nd Georgia Infantry; 48th Georgia Infantry; 64th Georgia Infantry; 2nd Georgia Infantry Battalion; 10th Georgia Infantry Battalion |

=== Cavalry Corps ===
| Division | Brigade | Regiments and Others |
|---|---|---|
| W.H.F. Lee's Division; MG W.H.F. Lee | Barringer's Brigade BG Rufus Barringer | 1st North Carolina Cavalry; 2nd North Carolina Cavalry; 3rd North Carolina Cavalry; 5th North Carolina Cavalry |
| W.H.F. Lee's Division; MG W.H.F. Lee | Beale's Brigade BG Richard L. T. Beale | 9th Virginia Cavalry; 10th Virginia Cavalry; 13th Virginia Cavalry |
| W.H.F. Lee's Division; MG W.H.F. Lee | Dearing's Brigade BG James Dearing | 8th Georgia Cavalry; 4th North Carolina Cavalry; 16th North Carolina Cavalry |
| | Horse Artillery Maj R. Preston Chew | Hart's (South Carolina) Battery; Graham's (Virginia) Battery; McGregor's (Virginia) Battery |

== Sources ==
- Trudeau, Noah Andre. The Last Citadel: Petersburg, Virginia June 1864 – April 1865. Boston, Massachusetts: Little, Brown and Company, 1991. ISBN 0-316-85327-5.
