= First Battle of Deep Bottom order of battle =

The order of battle for the First Battle of Deep Bottom includes:

- First Battle of Deep Bottom order of battle: Confederate
- First Battle of Deep Bottom order of battle: Union

== See also ==
- Second Battle of Deep Bottom
- Second Battle of Deep Bottom order of battle
