= Second Battle of Deep Bottom order of battle =

The order of battle for the Second Battle of Deep Bottom includes:

- Second Battle of Deep Bottom order of battle: Confederate
- Second Battle of Deep Bottom order of battle: Union

== See also ==
- First Battle of Deep Bottom
- First Battle of Deep Bottom order of battle
