= Henry Warner Birge =

Union Army general (1825–1888)

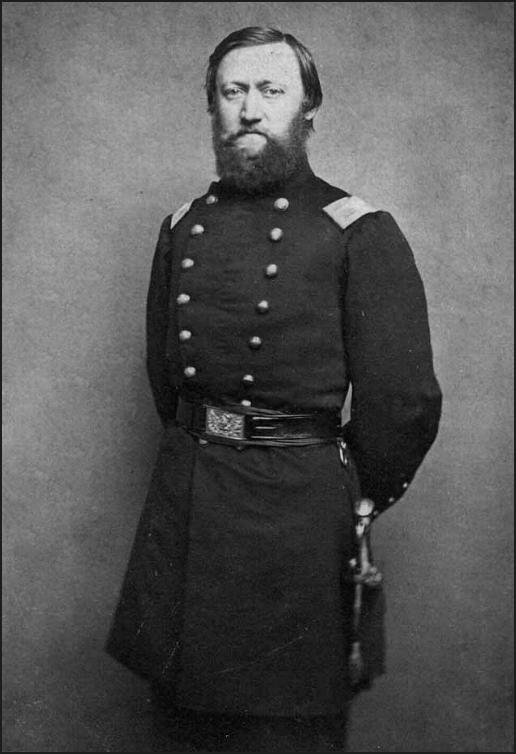
- Birge in 1862
- Born: August 25, 1825; Hartford, Connecticut
- Died: June 1, 1888 (aged 62); New York, New York
- Burial place: Yantic Cemetery, Norwich, Connecticut
- Military career
- Allegiance: United States of America; Union
- Branch: United States Army; Union Army
- Service years: 1861–1865
- Rank: Brigadier General; Brevet Major General
- Unit: 13th Connecticut Volunteer Infantry
- Commands: 2nd Division, XIX Corps; District of Savannah
- Conflicts: American Civil War; Battle of Georgia Landing; Battle of Irish Bend; Battle of Vermilion Bayou; Siege of Port Hudson; Battle of Monett's Ferry; Battle of Mansura; Second Battle of Deep Bottom; Battle of Opequon; Battle of Fisher's Hill; Battle of Cedar Creek
- Other work: Banker, Businessman

Henry Warner Birge (August 25, 1825 – June 1, 1888) was a Union Army general during the American Civil War.

== Biography ==
Birge was born in Hartford, Connecticut.

At the opening of the Civil War Birge organized the first state regiment of three-year troops, the 4th Connecticut Infantry, in which he was appointed major. After service in Maryland and Virginia he was commissioned colonel of the 13th Connecticut Infantry in February 1862 and was placed in command of the defenses of New Orleans. In December of the latter year he was appointed to the command of a brigade, which he retained through the first Red River Campaign and at the siege of Port Hudson. He was raised to the rank of brigadier general in September 1863, served in the second Red River expedition, and subsequently commanded at Baton Rouge. In 1864 he was assigned to the command of the second division of the XIX Corps. He participated in the battles of General Sheridan's campaign in the Shenandoah valley, and in February and March 1865, was appointed to the command of the defenses of Savannah. His brigade fought in the Carolinas campaign. After General Joseph E. Johnston surrendered, Birge again commanded the district of Savannah.

On February 25, 1865, President Abraham Lincoln nominated Birge for the award of the brevet major general, to rank from February 25, 1865, and the U.S. Senate confirmed the award on March 3, 1865. Birge resigned from the army on October 18, 1865.

== See also ==
- List of American Civil War generals (Union)

== Sources ==
- Eicher, John H., and David J. Eicher, Civil War High Commands. Stanford: Stanford University Press, 2001. ISBN 0-8047-3641-3.
- Warner, Ezra J. Generals in Blue: Lives of the Union Commanders. Baton Rouge: Louisiana State University Press, 1964. ISBN 0-8071-0822-7.
