= 10th Arkansas Infantry Regiment =

- Active: 1861–1865
- Disbanded: May 11, 1865
- Country: Confederate States
- Allegiance: Arkansas
- Branch: Confederate States Army
- Role: Infantry
- Size: Regiment
- Facings: Light blue
- Engagements: American Civil War: Battle of Shiloh; Battle of Baton Rouge; Battle of Port Hudson; Price's Missouri Raid; Battle of Fort Davidson; Fourth Battle of Boonville; Battle of Glasgow, Missouri; Battle of Sedalia; Second Battle of Lexington; Battle of Little Blue River; Second Battle of Independence; Battle of Byram's Ford; Battle of Westport; Battle of Marais des Cygnes; Battle of Mine Creek; Battle of Marmiton River; Second Battle of Newtonia

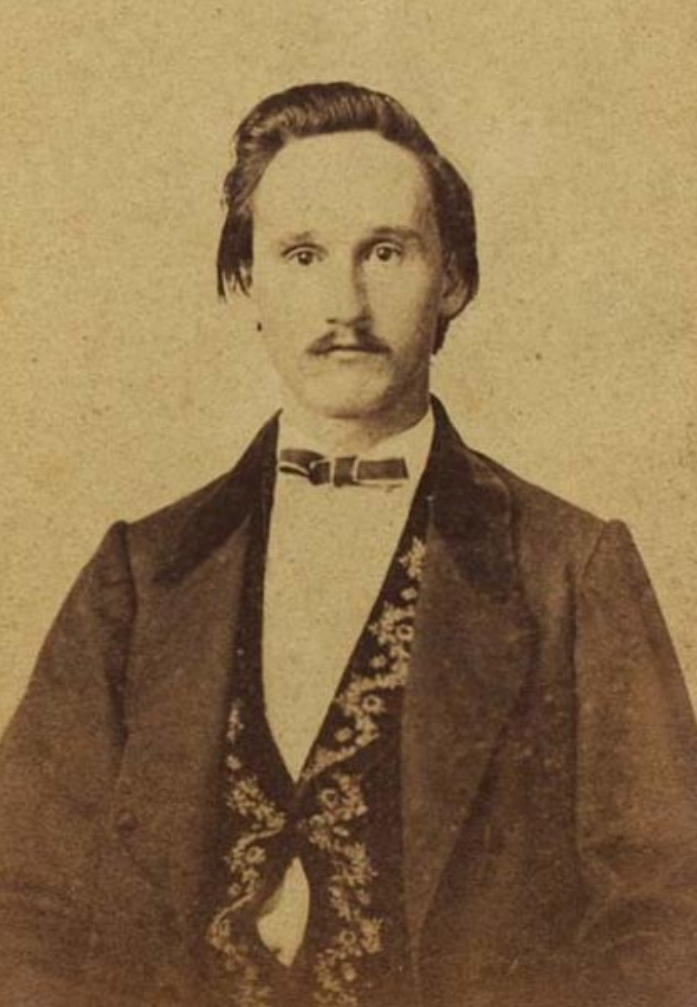
Col. E. L. Vaughan

The 10th Arkansas Infantry (1861–1865) was a Confederate Army infantry regiment during the American Civil War from the state of Arkansas. The unit is also known as A. R. Witt's Infantry, C. M. Cargile's Infantry, E. L. Vaughan's Infantry, Thomas D. Merrick's Infantry, S. S. Ford's Infantry, Obed Patty's Infantry, George A. Merrick's Infantry, Zebulon Venable's Infantry and Robert C. Bertrand's Infantry in contemporary accounts. After being captured at the Siege of Port Hudson, the unit reorganized as a mounted infantry unit, and was known as the 10th Arkansas Cavalry Regiment or Witt's Arkansas Cavalry.

== Organization ==
The 10th Arkansas Infantry Regiment was mustered into Confederate Service in July 1861 at Springfield in Conway County. Its members were drawn from the counties of Cleburne, Van Buren, Conway, and Perry. The unit comprised the following volunteer companies:

- Company A – the "Quitman Rifles", of Van Buren County, commanded by Captain A. R. Witt. This Company was originally organized as a volunteer militia company, under the command of Captain A. R. Witt in the 22nd Regiment, Arkansas State Militia, Van Buren County on June 24, 1861.
- Company B – the "Ready Rifles," of Conway County, commanded by Captain John T. Kirk.
- Company C – the "Choctaw Riflemen" from Van Buren County, commanded by Captain H.C. Barrett.
- Company D – the "White County Volunteers" from White County, commanded by Captain John A. Pemberton.
- Company E – the "Conway Invincibles" of Conway County, commanded by Captain M.H. Vaughn.
- Company F – the "Muddy Bayou Heroes" of Conway County, commanded by Captain Richard S. Fears.
- Company G – the "Red River Riflemen", of Van Buren County, commanded by Captain John B. Miller.
- Company H – the "Perry County Mountaineers", from Perry County, commanded by Captain R.F. Janes.
- Company I – the "Conway Tigers", of Conway County, commanded by Captain John W. Duncan.
- Company K – the "Springfield Sharpshooters." of Conway County, commanded by Captain W.S. Hanna. This Company was originally organized as a volunteer militia company, under the command of Captain S.S. Ford in the 4th Regiment, Arkansas State Militia, Conway County on July 27, 1860. Captain Ford became Lieutenant Colonel of the 10th Arkansas when formed.

The unit was originally commanded by Colonel T. D. Merrick, who had formerly held the rank of Major General of the Arkansas Militia and who carried Governor Rector's demand for the surrender of the Little Rock Arsenal to its commander in February 1861.

The regiment was armed with weapons which the state confiscated when the Federal Arsenal at Little Rock was seized by Arkansas State Militia troops in February 1861. Disposition of the weapons found in the Arsenal is somewhat sketchy, but from various records it can be surmised that the 9th and 10th Arkansas, Kelly's 9th Arkansas Battalion, and the 3rd Arkansas Cavalry were all issued flintlock Hall breechloading rifles from the Arsenal.

== Battles ==
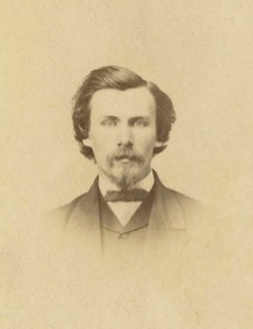
Captain William W Martin, Company A, "Quitman Rifles" 10th Arkansas Infantry Regiment

The 10th Arkansas moved to Union City, Tennessee, where 150 men died from the effects of measles. The regiment was assigned to General Bowen's Brigade, consisting of the 9th and 10th Arkansas, 5th Missouri and 10th Mississippi Infantry Regiments before they were moved to Kentucky. They remained at Bowling Green, Kentucky, until the evacuation of that place when they were placed to guard the rear on the retreat. After the losses of Fort Henry and Fort Donelson in February 1862, Confederate General Albert Sidney Johnston withdrew his forces into western Tennessee, northern Mississippi, and Alabama to reorganize. and then retreated through western Tennessee to Corinth, Mississippi. On March 29, 1862, the Army of Central Kentucky was merged into the Army of Mississippi in preparation for the Battle of Shiloh. Bowen's Brigade, including the 9th and 10th Arkansas Infantry Regiments, was then placed in General Brigadier General John C. Breckinridge's Reserve Corps as part of the Army of Mississippi. The 10th Arkansas fought on the Confederate right flank at the Battle of Shiloh on April 6, 1862, participating in the many vicious attacks against the "Hornet's Nest" which ultimately led to the surrender of Prentiss's division. The 10th's final attack ended around dark when they ran up against Grant's Last Line. At this same time, Confederate attacks were called off until the next day. The 10th Arkansas lost about 160 men at Shiloh. After the Battle of Shiloh, the regiment, withdrew to Corinth, Mississippi, where they reorganized.

In early May 1862, Confederate forces underwent an army-wide reorganization due to the passage of the Conscription Act by the Confederate Congress in April 1862. All twelve-month regiments had to re-muster and enlist for two additional years or the duration of the war; a new election of officers was ordered; and men who were exempted from service by age or other reasons under the Conscription Act were allowed to take a discharge and go home. Officers who did not choose to stand for re-election were also offered a discharge. The reorganization was accomplished among all the Arkansas regiments in and around Corinth, Mississippi, following the Battle of Shiloh. The 10th Arkansas was reduced to eight companies in April 1862 by transferring the personnel of Company F to Company C and dividing Company I among all the other companies. Formal charges related to the disorganized condition of his regiment were brought against Colonel Merrick. He resigned and on May 27, 1862, and Captain A. R. Witt of Company A, was promoted to colonel and became commander of the regiment.

In October 1862, the regiment contained 249 effectives. The regiment moved near Vicksburg, Mississippi, where they stayed some time on the Yazoo River, at Camp Price. Then they were moved to Vicksburg, where they stayed a short while. They were placed in a brigade commanded by General Jeff Thompson, and moved to Louisiana, 30 to 40 miles (48 to 64 km) above New Orleans, where they spent the winter of 1862–63 guarding the New Orleans, Jackson and Great Northern Railway.

By the early spring of 1863, the 10th Arkansas was sent again to Baton Rouge where they were to prepare defenses against the approaching General N. P. Banks. This they did by felling large numbers of trees to block the roadways leading to Baton Rouge, digging trenches and mounting siege guns around the city.

By 1 March 1863, the 10th Arkansas Infantry was at Port Hudson, Louisiana, above New Orleans and during March 7–27 as part of a force under General Franklin Gardner, they were in operations against Federal forces at Port Hudson. After a series of engagements lasting into July, 1863, the 10th Arkansas Infantry, was surrendered with the garrison by General Gardner to Union General N. P. Banks. The 10th apparently continued to have internal problems during the siege of Port Hudson. Certain officers of the 10th Arkansas apparently influenced some enlisted men to desert and refuse to alternate duties with their fellow companies. By July 7, just two days before the garrison capitulated, there was practically open mutiny. On July 9, 1863, the garrison surrendered and the 10th Arkansas became prisoners of war. The men were paroled until exchanged, with the officers were imprisoned at Johnson's Island, Ohio, in Lake Erie. The unit was eventually exchanged and returned to Arkansas. Col. A. R. Witt reorganized the unit, including some newly recruited members to form Witt's Arkansas Cavalry.

The Regiment was assigned to the following higher commands while it served east of the Mississippi River:

- October 31, 1861 – Sixth Brigade – First Division – Western Department.
- November 30, 1861 – Second Brigade – Fourth Division – Western Department.
- January 31, 1862 – Bowen's Brigade – Floyd's Division – Central Army of Kentucky.
- February 22, 1862 – Second Brigade – Third Division – Central Army of Kentucky, Western Department.
- April 6, 1862 – Second Brigade – Reserve Corps – Army of the Mississippi.
- March 31, 1863 – Buford's Brigade – Third Military District – Department of Mississippi and East Louisiana.
- April 30, 1863 – Maxey's Brigade – Third Military District – Department of Mississippi and East Louisiana.

Like almost all Civil War units, the regiment was frequently known by an alternate designation derived from the name of the unit's commanding officer. The regiment participated in the following engagements during its career as an infantry regiment east of the Mississippi River:

- Battle, Pittsburg Landing, Shiloh, Tennessee - April 6–7, 1862.
- Engagement, Baton Rouge, Louisiana - August 5, 1862.
- Operations against expedition from Pass Manchac and Ponchatuoula, Louisiana - September 13–15, 1862,
- Skirmish, Bayou Bonfonca, Louisiana - November 21, 1862.
- Port Hudson Campaign
  - Operations against Port Hudson, Louisiana - March 7–27, 1863.
  - Action, Plain's Store, Louisiana - May 21, 1863.
  - Siege, Port Hudson, Louisiana - May 24–July 9, 1863.
  - Assault, Port Hudson, Louisiana - May 27, 1863.
  - Assault, Port Hudson, Louisiana - June 14, 1863.
  - Surrender, Port Hudson, Louisiana - July 9, 1863.

=== Witt's 10th Arkansas Cavalry ===
Witt's Arkansas Cavalry, commanded by Colonel A. R. Witt, was composed primarily of men who had served with the Tenth Arkansas Infantry, been captured at Port Hudson, Louisiana, and after being exchanged, returned to Arkansas. Though the veterans of the 10th Arkansas Infantry were the backbone of the new unit, Colonel Witt also conducted extensive recruiting outside the immediate area of Springfield and Conway County. Most of the men in companies C, D, and G were raised in nearby Clinton [Van Buren County]; nine of the unit's twenty-one company grade officers were from that town as well. A few recruits were also found in Batesville, Searcy, Carrollton, Jacksonport, and Austin. Some were veterans of other regiments.

On numerous occasions, the unit served behind Federal lines. A Federal report indicated that it often employed female sympathizers to spy on Federal installations and troop movements, reporting the information obtained back to the command. One of these spies was reported to be operating in Little Rock in mid-November, 1864.

The unit served unattached throughout its career, with the exception of Price's Missouri Expedition in late 1864. During this time it was attached to Major General Fagan's division of Arkansas Troops. The unit took part in the following engagements as a mounted force in the Department of the Tran-Mississippi:

- Skirmishes, Clear Creek and Tomahawk, Arkansas, January 22, 1864.
- Skirmish, Rolling Prairie, Arkansas, January 23, 1864.
- Skirmish, Sylamore Creek, Arkansas, January 23, 1864.
- Skirmishes near Burrowsville, Arkansas, January 23, 1864.
- Skirmish, Crooked Creek, Arkansas, February 5, 1864.
- Skirmish, Bayou Des Arc, Arkansas, July 13–16, 1864.
- Skirmish, Gum Swamp, Arkansas, July 17, 1864.
- Skirmish, Austin, Arkansas, July 17, 1864.
- Camden Expedition, Arkansas, March–May, 1864.
- Price's Missouri Raid, Arkansas-Missouri-Kansas, September–October, 1864.
  - Skirmish near Quitman, Arkansas (detachment), September 2, 1864.
  - Battle of Fort Davidson, Missouri, September 27, 1864.
  - Fourth Battle of Boonville, Missouri, October 11, 1864.
  - Battle of Glasgow, Missouri, October 15, 1864.
  - Battle of Sedalia, Missouri, October 15, 1864.
  - Second Battle of Lexington, Missouri, October 19, 1864.
  - Battle of Little Blue River, Missouri, October 21, 1864.
  - Second Battle of Independence, Missouri, October 21–22, 1864.
  - Battle of Byram's Ford, Missouri, October 22–23, 1864.
  - Battle of Westport, Missouri, October 23, 1864.
  - Battle of Marais des Cygnes, Linn County, Kansas, October 25, 1864.
  - Battle of Mine Creek, Missouri, October 25, 1864.
  - Battle of Marmiton River, Missouri, October 25, 1864.
  - Second Battle of Newtonia, Missouri, October 28, 1864.
  - Skirmish near Lewisburg, Arkansas – February 12, 1865.

Unlike most of the units which accompanied Price after the Missouri expedition, Witt's Cavalry did not retreat all the way to northeastern Texas. The command remained, instead, in Arkansas, probably in order to continue its spying operations. The 3rd Arkansas (United States) Cavalry met and "scattered" Witt's command in a skirmish near Lewisburg, Arkansas, on February 12, 1865.

== Surrender ==
In the reorganization of the Trans-Mississippi Department following Price's Missouri Expedition, the 10th Arkansas was assigned to the command of Brigadier General M. Jeff Thompson, commander of the Military Sub-District of Northeast Arkansas and Southeast Missouri. Thompson formally surrendered his command at Chalk Bluff, Arkansas, on May 11, 1865, and agreed to have his men assemble at Wittsburg and Jacksonport, Arkansas, to lay down their arms and receive their paroles. At the time, Thompson's command was widely dispersed throughout northeast Arkansas, mainly for reasons of available forage. Colonel Witt, who had continued to operate in the vicinity of Quitman, wrote to Major General Reynolds, commander of Union forces in the Department of Arkansas, on May 18, 1865, stating his intention to surrender and help restore order in the area.

General

Seeing the hopelessness of any further struggle, and not wishing to be placed in the attitude of a guerrilla, bushwhacker, or marauder, which I would necessarily be should I prosecute a further hopeless strife, and being fully satisfied that the regular organized armies of the Confederate States east of the Mississippi River are surrendered, I have determined, on the 5th proximo, at Jacksonport, to surrender my command, but it is impossible for me to prevail on some of my men to deliver their arms until they have some assurance from the U.S. authorities that those independent companies and squads claiming protection under the Federal Government are immediately disarmed. I am confident that you are not aware of the many murderous crimes and outrageous depredations committed on the people through the country, or their course would have been ended before this. I called the attention of Colonel Ryan, commanding at Lewisburg, to this matter last winter, but he seemed to take no action in the matter whatever, and I am very well satisfied that peace and order can easily be restored should these fellows be disarmed, as my men have no particular animosity against the Federal Government, and are now willing to submit to the laws of the country and the requirements of the U.S. forces if they can be let alone by these independent men. I have been requested by the citizens of this county to say to you that they are exceedingly anxious for peace, and if you will send them instructions how to proceed, they will establish law and order without the trouble and expense of an armed force to do that for them; but should troops be necessary, they petition you not to send men of this State, who have personal grudges, but a command of some other State, who are not prejudiced and who will do justice to all parties. Will you inform me whether men who have not been engaged in this war, that have not yet taken the oath, will have to report and do so or not. Things will be quite easy, I think, in this portion of the country, if these independent fellows were disbanded and disarmed, as I could then control the Southern soldiers without further difficulty, and the citizens seem very anxious to go forth and restore law and order were they not prevented by these armed forces.

Very respectfully,

A. R. WITT,

Colonel.

Colonel Witt and the survivors of the 10th Arkansas Mounted Infantry surrendered and were paroled at Jacksonport on June 5, 1865. Most of the men on the Jacksonport parole lists actually served in the 10th Arkansas regiment, but some were attached to various companies simply for the purpose of surrendering. A few may never have seen any service and marched to Jacksonport to receive a parole, which provided former Confederates with some degree of protection from arrest or capture.

== See also ==
- List of Confederate units from Arkansas
- Confederate Units by State
