= Second Battle of Deep Bottom order of battle: Union =

The following Union Army units and commanders fought in the Second Battle of Deep Bottom (Aug 13-20, 1864) during the Petersburg campaign of the American Civil War. Order of battle is compiled from the official tabulation of casualties and includes only units which sustained casualties.

== Abbreviations ==
=== Rank ===
- MG = Major General
- BG = Brigadier General
- Col = Colonel
- Ltc = Lieutenant Colonel
- Maj = Major
- Cpt = Captain

== Army of the Potomac ==
=== II Corps ===
MG Winfield S. Hancock

Division	Brigade	Regiments and Others
First Division; BG Francis C. Barlow; BG Nelson A. Miles	First Brigade BG Nelson A. Miles; Col James C. Lynch	28th Massachusetts; 26th Michigan; 5th New Hampshire; 2nd New York Heavy Artillery; 4th New York Heavy Artillery; 61st New York; 81st Pennsylvania; 140th Pennsylvania; 183rd Pennsylvania
First Division; BG Francis C. Barlow; BG Nelson A. Miles	Consolidated Brigade Col Levin Crandell	7th New York Veteran (5 companies); 39th New York (6 companies); 52nd New York (6 companies); 57th New York; 62nd New York (6 companies); 69th New York (6 companies); 88th New York (5 companies); 111th New York; 125th New York; 126th New York
First Division; BG Francis C. Barlow; BG Nelson A. Miles	Fourth Brigade Ltc K. Oscar Broady	7th New York Heavy Artillery; 64th New York; 66th New York; 53rd Pennsylvania; 116th Pennsylvania; 145th Pennsylvania; 148th Pennsylvania
Second Division; Col Thomas A. Smyth	First Brigade Col George N. Macy; Ltc Horace P. Rugg	19th Maine; 19th Massachusetts; 26th Massachusetts; 1st Company Massachusetts Sharpshooters; 7th Michigan; 1st Minnesota Battalion (2 companies); 59th New York; 152nd New York; 184th Pennsylvania; 36th Wisconsin: Ltc Clement Warner (w); Cpt Austin Cannon
Second Division; Col Thomas A. Smyth	Second Brigade Col Mathew Murphy	8th New York Heavy Artillery; 155th New York; 164th New York; 170th New York; 182nd New York
Second Division; Col Thomas A. Smyth	Third Brigade Ltc Francis E. Pierce	14th Connecticut; 1st Delaware; 2nd Delaware (2 companies); 12th New Jersey; 10th New York (6 companies); 108th New York; 4th Ohio (4 companies); 69th Pennsylvania; 106th Pennsylvania (3 companies); 7th West Virginia (4 companies)
Second Division; Col Thomas A. Smyth	Artillery Brigade	Maine Light, Sixth Battery; 1st New York Light, Battery G
Third Division; BG Gershom Mott	First Brigade BG Régis de Trobriand	20th Indiana; 1st Maine Heavy Artillery; 17th Maine; 40th New York; 73rd New York; 86th New York; 124th New York; 63rd Pennsylvania (3 companies); 99th Pennsylvania; 110th Pennsylvania; 2nd U.S. Sharpshooters
Third Division; BG Gershom Mott	Second Brigade Col Calvin A. Craig (k August 16th); Col John Pulford	1st Massachusetts Heavy Artillery; 5th Michigan; 93rd New York; 57th Pennsylvania; 84th Pennsylvania; 105th Pennsylvania; 141st Pennsylvania; 1st U.S. Sharpshooters
Third Division; BG Gershom Mott	Third Brigade Col Robert McAllister	11th Massachusetts (7 companies); 5th New Jersey (3 companies); 6th New Jersey (3 companies); 7th New Jersey; 8th New Jersey; 11th New Jersey; 72nd New York (1 company); 120th New York
Third Division; BG Gershom Mott	Artillery Brigade	1st New Jersey Light, Battery B; 1st Pennsylvania Light, Battery F

== Army of the James ==
=== X Corps ===
MG David B. Birney

Division	Brigade	Regiments and Others
First Division; BG Alfred H. Terry	First Brigade Col Francis B. Pond; Col Alvin C. Voris; Col Joshua B. Howell	39th Illinois; 62nd Ohio; 67th Ohio; 85th Pennsylvania
First Division; BG Alfred H. Terry	Second Brigade Col Joseph R. Hawley; Col Joseph C. Abbott	6th Connecticut; 7th Connecticut; 3rd New Hampshire; 7th New Hampshire; 16th New York Heavy Artillery (7 companies)
First Division; BG Alfred H. Terry	Third Brigade BG Robert S. Foster	10th Connecticut; 11th Maine; 1st Maryland Cavalry (dismounted); 24th Massachusetts; 100th New York
Second Division; BG John Wesley Turner	First Brigade [not engaged]	
Second Division; BG John Wesley Turner	Second Brigade Ltc William B. Coan	47th New York; 48th New York; 76th Pennsylvania; 97th Pennsylvania
Second Division; BG John Wesley Turner	Third Brigade Col Francis A. Osborn (w August 16th); Ltc Nathan J Johnson (w August 16th); Maj Ezra L Walrath (w August 16th); Cpt Francis Wayland Parker (w August 16th); Cpt Robert J. Gray	13th Indiana (3 companies); 9th Maine; 4th New Hampshire; 115th New York; 169th New York
Second Division; BG John Wesley Turner	Colored Brigade BG William Birney	29th Connecticut; 7th U.S. Colored Troops; 8th U.S. Colored Troops; 9th U.S. Colored Troops
Second Division; BG John Wesley Turner	Artillery Brigade Ltc Freeman McGilvery	Connecticut Light, 1st Battery; New Jersey Light, 4th Battery; 3rd Rhode Island Heavy, Battery C; 1st U.S., Batteries C & D
Second Division; BG John Wesley Turner	Unassigned	4th Massachusetts Cavalry, 1st & 3rd Battalions
Cavalry Division; BG David McM. Gregg	First Brigade Col William Stedman	1st Massachusetts; 1st New Jersey; 10th New York; 6th Ohio; 1st Pennsylvania
Cavalry Division; BG David McM. Gregg	Second Brigade Col J. Irvin Gregg (w August 16th); Col Michael Kerwin	1st Maine; 2nd Pennsylvania; 4th Pennsylvania; 13th Pennsylvania; 16th Pennsylvania
Cavalry Division; BG David McM. Gregg	Artillery Brigade	2nd U.S., Battery A

=== References ===
- U.S. War Department, The War of the Rebellion: a Compilation of the Official Records of the Union and Confederate Armies, U.S. Government Printing Office, 1880–1901.
- Horn, John. The Siege of Petersburg: The Battles for the Weldon Railroad August 1864. El Dorado Hills, California: Savas Beatie, 2015.
