= Expedition to Pass Manchac and Ponchatoula =

Action of the American Civil War

- Part of the American Civil War
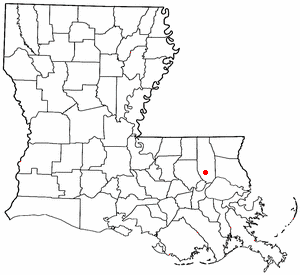
Date	September 13–15, 1862
Location	Pass Manchac, Louisiana and Ponchatoula, Louisiana
Result	Inconclusive

Belligerents
United States (Union)	(Confederate States of America) Confederate States

Commanders and leaders
Benjamin F. Butler; George C. Strong; Abner Read	Daniel Ruggles; M. Jeff Thompson; Allen R. Witt

Units involved
13th Connecticut; 12th Maine; 26th Massachusetts	10th Arkansas; 9th Louisiana, Company D C.S.A. Home Guard

Strength
900; USS New London; Steamer Ceres	1,500; 6 Cannons

Casualties and losses
16 killed 22 wounded 2 missing	20 killed unknown wounded

The Expedition to Pass Manchac and Ponchatoula was a military engagement of the American Civil War that took place September 13–15, 1862 in and around Pass Manchac and Ponchatoula, Louisiana. The objective of the Union troops was to sabotage the Manchac bridge and to possibly capture Confederate Brig. Gen. M. Jeff Thompson to prevent a reprise attack from the Confederates into New Orleans. Union forces reached the town under fire from Confederate troops and ended up damaging the Manchac railroad bridge and burning 20 freight train cars after overwhelming the Confederate forces. The Confederate then regrouped with reinforcements and attacked the federal troops, forcing them back to New Orleans.

== Background ==
Brig. Gen. M. Jeff Thompson was ordered during his command held at Ponchatoula to repair the railroad bridge in Pass Manchac. However, after the Capture of New Orleans, Maj. Gen. Benjamin F. Butler found out about the bridge reconstruction and feared a reprisal assault on New Orleans from Confederate forces. He therefore concocted a plan and ordered Maj. George C. Strong to destroy the railroad bridge and to capture Brig. Gen. Thompson in the town of Ponchatoula.

== Union Forces ==
- 13th Connecticut Infantry Regiment
- 12th Maine Volunteer Infantry Regiment
- 26th Regiment Massachusetts Volunteer Infantry
- USS New London
- Steamer Ceres

Union Commanders
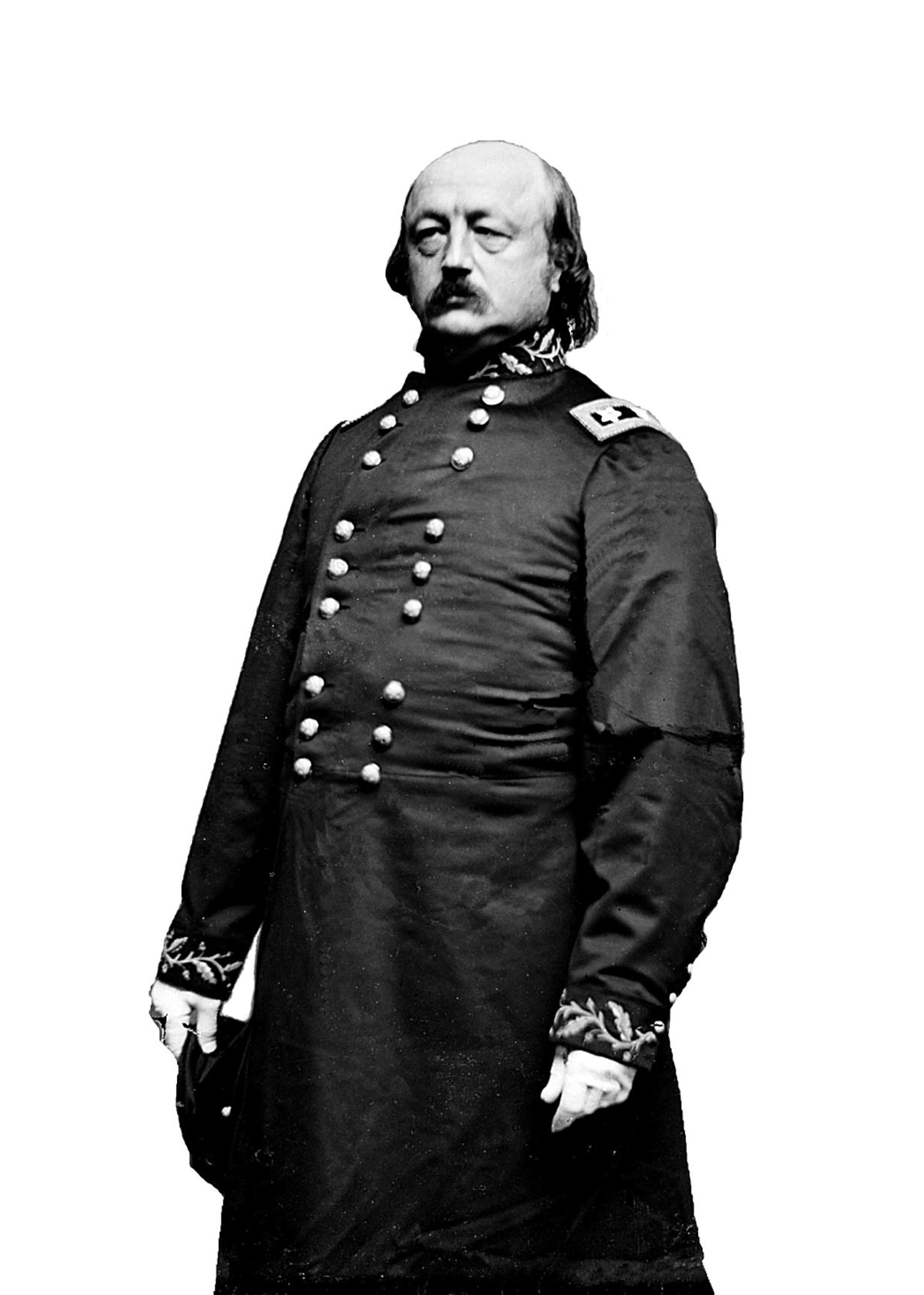
Maj. Gen.
Benjamin F. Butler, USA

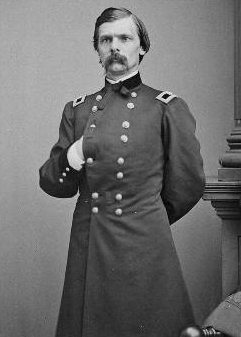
Maj.
George C. Strong, USA

== Confederate Forces ==
- 10th Arkansas Infantry Regiment
- 9th Louisiana, Company D
- Confederate Home Guard
- 6 Cannons

Confederate Commanders
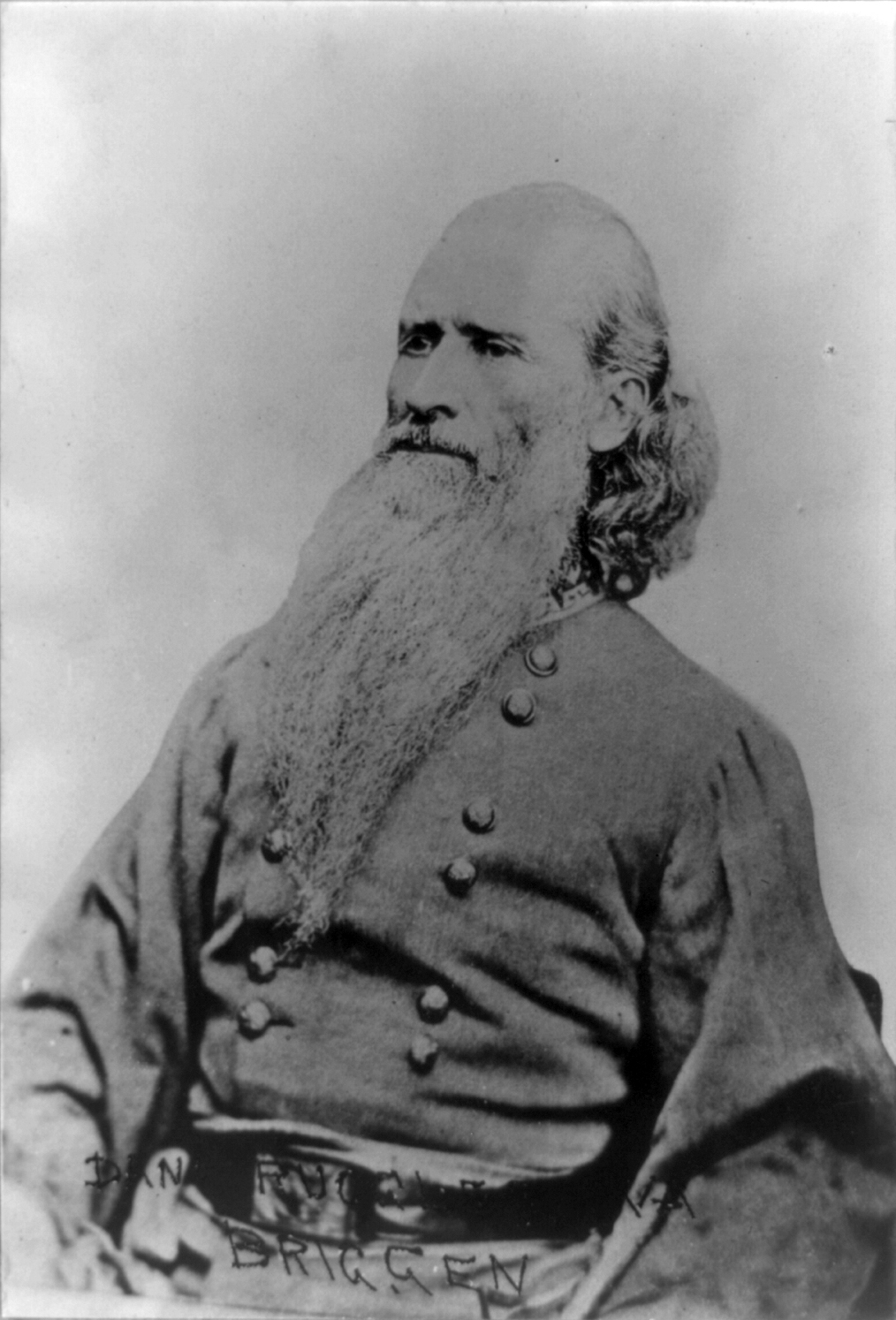
Brig. Gen.
Daniel Ruggles, CSA

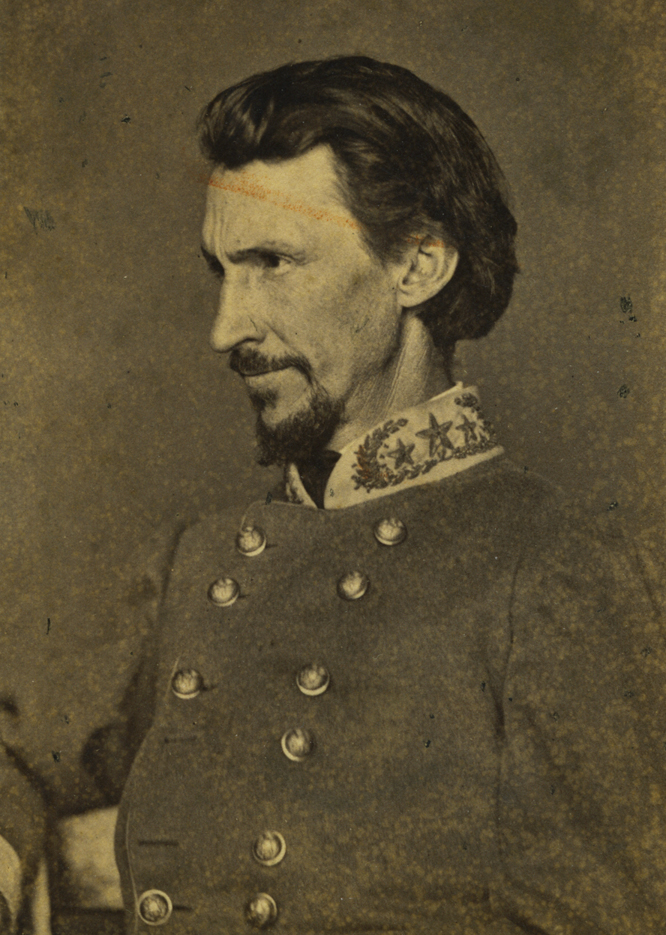
Brig. Gen.
M. Jeff Thompson, CSA

== General Butler's Plan ==
For this engagement, General Butler planned a strategic attack in which he would send the USS New London filled with troops to land at Manchac Pass. At daybreak, this unit would destroy the Manchac railroad bridge and push the enemy soldiers northward right into town. This maneuver was to draw the Confederates attention more south of town so that a larger infantry unit aboard the Ceres could sail east of the town along the Tangipahoa River. Arriving at their checkpoint the Ceres troops would land ashore, march six miles into town, flank the Confederates, capture the town along with General Thompson, and overwhelm their infantry to the point where there was no way to retreat.

== September 13th and 14th ==
Unbeknownst to the Confederates at the moment, the Yankees began to plan their siege towards the town of Ponchatoula. At 12:30 p.m. Captain Abner Read resided at Pontchartrain Wharf to await the departure of the troops across the lake. Maj. George C. Strong along with three companies from the 12th Maine Volunteer Infantry Regiment and one company from the 26th Regiment Massachusetts Volunteer Infantry boarded the Steamer Ceres from Lakeport. Prior to their boarding Maj. Strong ordered 100 men of the 13th Connecticut Infantry Regiment to board the USS New London under the command of then Capt. Read. However, sailing the USS New London toward Manchac was difficult. The boat made several attempts to cross the bar and found only five feet of water to float in, plus the cover of darkness was more of an obstacle than of help. Also the Steamer Ceres carrying the other troops up the river had to scrap their plan because the river was to narrow and winding that they could not make it to their checkpoint, even trying two nights in a row.

== September 15th, The Battle ==
After two failed attempts to maneuver the ships for landing at their specific locations, Maj. Strong ordered the Ceres to Manchac Bridge on the morning of September 15 while the USS New London anchored in the lake. When landing, Strong ordered one company of the 12th Maine under the command of Capt. Winter to destroy the Manchac railroad bridge. Strong then ordered Capt. Pickering's 26th Massachusetts Co. F to guard the Ceres while he and the other two companies of the 12th Maine started 10 miles up the road onto Ponchatoula. The boys of the 13th Connecticut stayed anchored with the USS New London. 9 miles later as the two companies of about 125 strong grew closer to town, they were spotted by a locomotive, the men fired on the train which was headed to Camp Moore. As the train rode off blowing its horn warning the town of the invading Yankees, the 12th Maine hurried its way towards the city before the train could reach the camp a little north of Kentwood.

Upon arrival into town, the 12th Maine were bombarded with artillery fire and were met with fire from 300 soldiers of the 10th Arkansas Infantry Regiment along with some local Confederate Home Guard. Capt. Thorton of the 12th Maine was then hit by a canister with three balls lodged into his body and up to four holes blown throughout his clothing. The 12th Maine then took cover from the oncoming fire and spread out their line to where one section flanked left and the other flanked right. The Confederate positions then became overwhelmed with Union gunfire that their artillery retreated into the northwestern direction of the woods with the infantry shortly following. After the retreat, soldiers of the 12th Maine set ablaze a train of 20 cars carrying cotton, sugar, and molasses. They to destroyed the bridge over the Ponchatoula River. Lastly, they took documents from the post office and telegraph office even destroying the telegraph equipment. Although they failed to capture Brig. Gen. Thompson, they did enter the hotel he was occupying, and took his sword, spurs, and bridle.

While the Union troops captured the town, word got to Brig. Gen. Daniel Ruggles about the attack and retreat. He then sent word to Gen. Earl Van Dorn asking for reinforcements. The troops were then reinforced most likely from Camp Moore with around 1,000 more troops. The troops led by Col. Allen R. Witt of the 10th Arkansas drew back the enemy and retook the batteries resuming artillery fire. The 26th Massachusetts guarding the Ceres, was also kept as a reserve corps. They then marched up the road and gave cover fire to the 12th Maine as they retreated to keep them from being outflanked by the Confederates. The federal troops were forced to leave their dead on the field as well as the wounded. Along with the doctors and wounded, in the town hospital, they would become prisoners. Private Elmore Dane of the 26th Massachusetts had this to say about the final moments of this engagement...

"Out of 125 men, 40 were killed, wounded, and missing—almost 50 percent of our number. We were kept as a reserved corps and came up just in time to save the rest of the party from all being taken prisoners. We kept the enemy from out-flanking them and covered their retreat. The fight took place at Paschola [Ponchatoula, La.]. We went up the Manchac river to the Jackson and New Orleans Railroad and marched up the road. It was a bad defeat for us. We had no artillery and the Rebels were 1500 strong with 5 pieces of artillery. We were obliged to leave our dead on the field and the wounded in the hospital with the doctor and assistants as prisoners in the Rebels’ hands as prisoners. It was a hard jaunt and well nigh cost us all imprisonment... One more died in the hospital from our company last night. His name was Dennis Golden. He belonged in Boston. We also lost one yesterday—Corp. Lewis. He was from Boston. Golden was unmarried but Lewis was married and had three children. Lewis died in the field or rather on the retreat from the battlefield. This makes 3 from Co. F that have gone to rest."

— Pvt. Elmore Dane, 26th Massachusetts Co. F

== Aftermath ==
After the retreat of the Union, the Confederates recaptured Ponchatoula, even though the Union did succeed in destroying the Manchac railroad bridge, a bridge over the Ponchatoula River, the telegraph equipment, and the 20 train cars. The Union suffered 16 dead, 22 wounded, and around 2 missing, while the Confederates suffered around 20 dead and untold wounded. 6 months later the new federal commanding officer Gen. Nathaniel Banks heard a rumor of a possible arrival by Gen. Stonewall Jackson at Camp Moore, with over 30,000 men. Fearing another reprisal to retake New Orleans, he would plan another expedition into the town of Ponchatoula to destroy the railways from being used by the Confederates to attack the crescent city. This engagement by Banks would come to be known as the Battle of Ponchatoula.

== See also ==
- Louisiana in the American Civil War
