= Battle of Deep Bottom =

Battle of Deep Bottom may refer to:

- First Battle of Deep Bottom, July 27–29, 1864
- Second Battle of Deep Bottom, August 14–20, 1864
