= Gen. Edward F. Jones House =

Historic house in New York, United States

- U.S. National Register of Historic Places
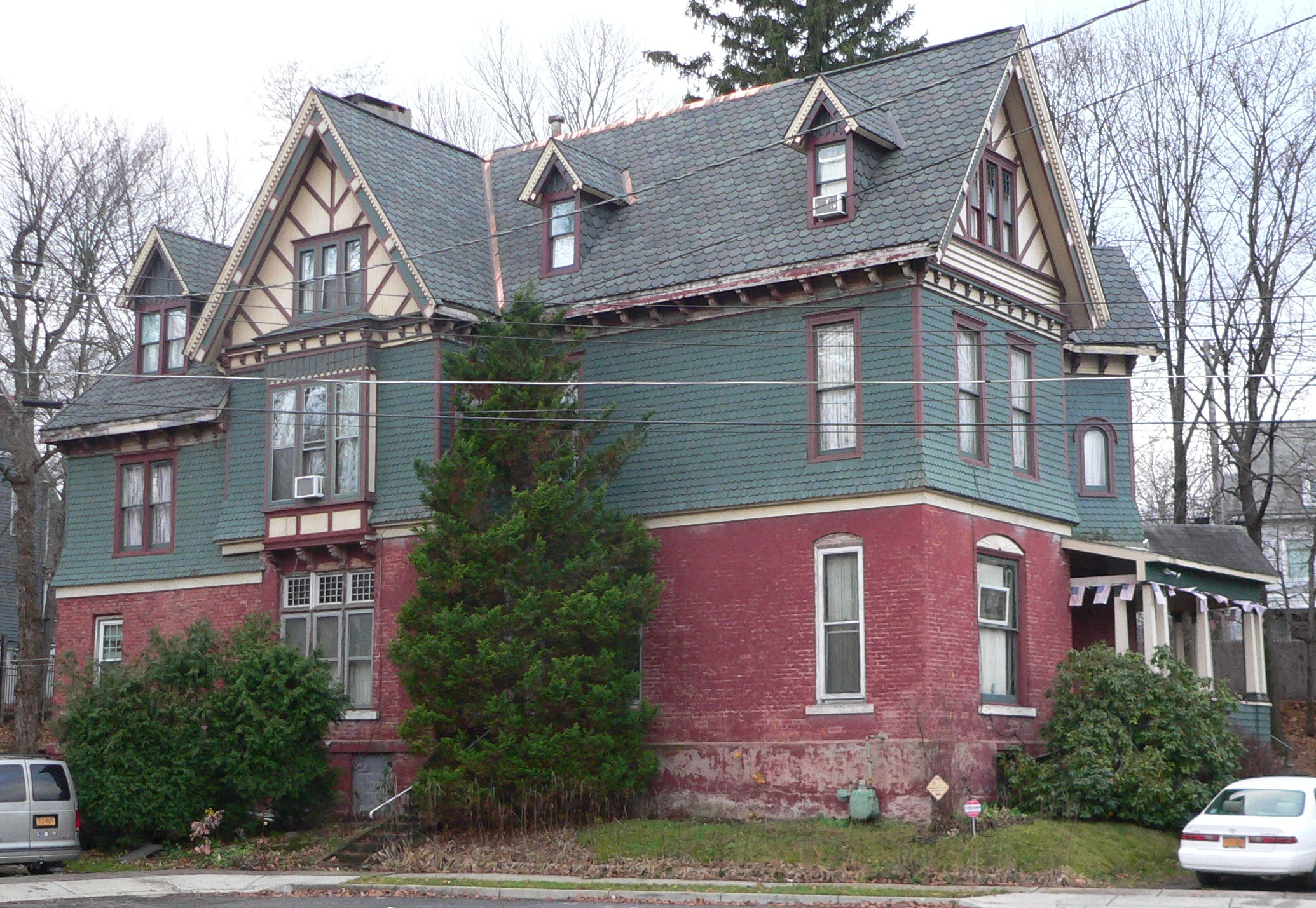
- Jones house, seen from Asbury Court

- Location within New York Location within the United States
- Interactive map showing the location of Gen Edward F. Jones House
- Location: 9 Asbury Court, Binghamton, New York
- Coordinates: 42°5′58″N 75°55′37″W
- Area: less than one acre
- Built: 1883
- Architectural style: Queen Anne
- NRHP reference No.: 05000020
- Added to NRHP: February 9, 2005

Gen. Edward F. Jones House is a historic home located at Binghamton in Broome County, New York. It was constructed in 1872 and is a large 2 1/2-story, irregularly shaped building built of an eclectic combination of materials and textures. It was part of a large estate assembled by General Edward F. Jones (1828–1913) by 1883. The foundation and first floor are constructed of brick while the upper stories are of wood with shingle, beaded board, and clapboard siding. It is an exceptional example of the Queen Anne style.

It was listed on the National Register of Historic Places in 2005.
