= 13th Connecticut Infantry Regiment =

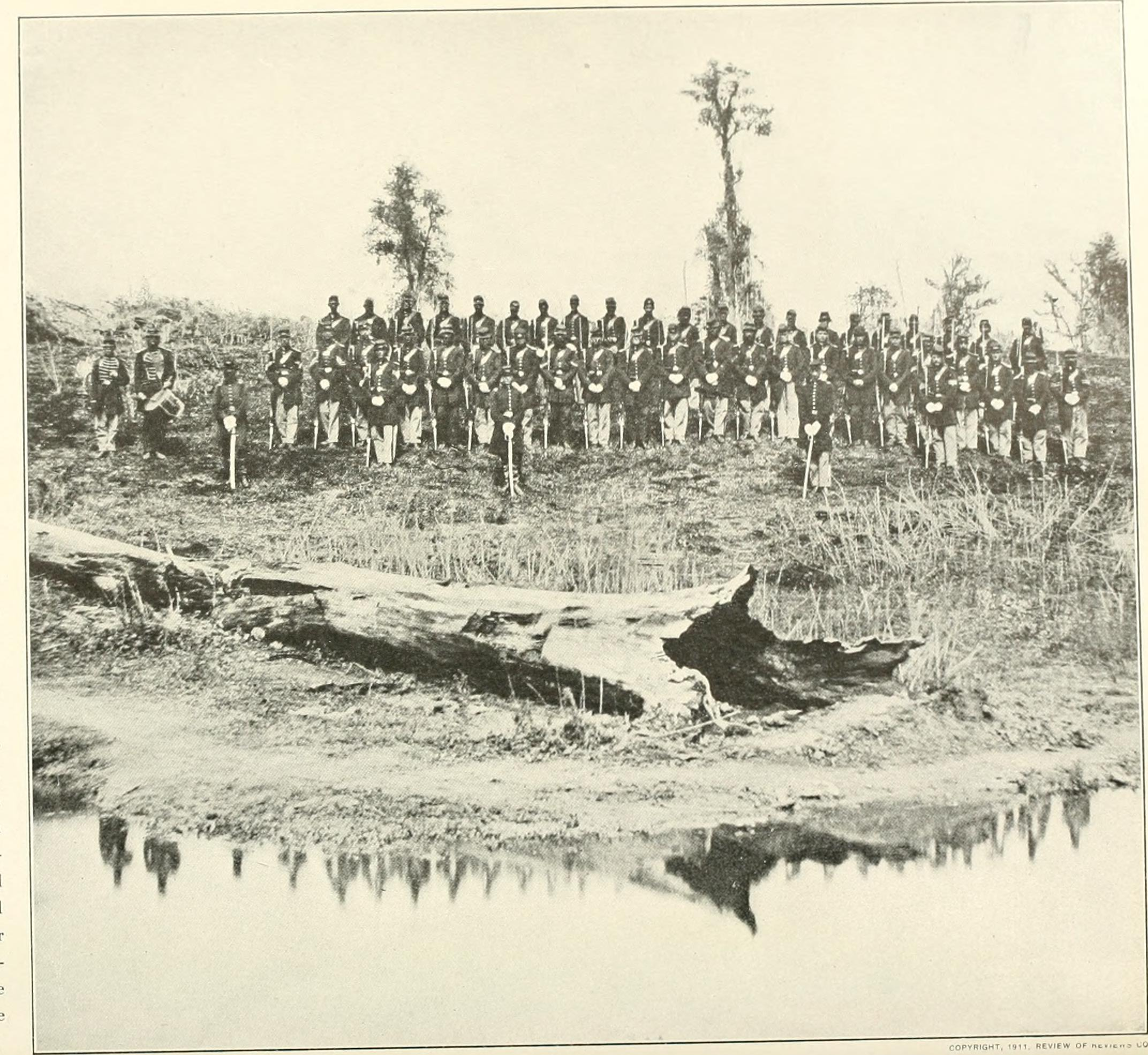
- 13th Connecticut on the Mississippi
- Active: November 25, 1861, to August 12, 1865
- Country: United States
- Allegiance: Union
- Branch: Infantry
- Engagements: Battle of Georgia Landing; Bayou Teche Campaign; Battle of Irish Bend; Battle of Vermilion Bayou; Siege of Port Hudson; Battle of Monett's Ferry; Battle of Mansura; Battle of Brashear City (detachment); Red River Campaign; Shenandoah Valley Campaign; Battle of Opequon; Battle of Fisher's Hill; Battle of Cedar Creek

The 13th Connecticut Infantry Regiment was an infantry regiment that served in the Union Army during the American Civil War.

== Service ==
The 13th Connecticut Infantry Regiment was organized at New Haven, Connecticut, beginning November 25, 1861, and mustered in for a three-year enlistment on January 7, 1862, under the command of Colonel Henry Warner Birge.

The regiment was attached to 1st Brigade, Department of the Gulf, to September 1862. Weitzel's Reserve Brigade, Department Gulf, to December 1862. Grover's Division, Department of the Gulf, to January 1863. 3rd Brigade, 3rd Division, XIX Corps, Department of the Gulf, January 1863. 2nd Brigade, 4th Division, XIX Corps, to March 1863. 3rd Brigade, 4th Division, XIX Corps, to August 1863. 1st Brigade, 4th Division, XIX Corps, to February 1864. 2nd Brigade, 2nd Division, XIX Corps, Department of the Gulf, to July 1864, and Army of the Shenandoah, Middle Military Division, to January 1865. District of Savannah, Georgia, Department of the South, to March 1865. 1st Brigade, 1st Division, X Corps, Department of North Carolina, to April 1865. District of Georgia, Department of the South, to April 1866.

The 13th Connecticut Infantry mustered out of service April 25, 1866, at Fort Pulaski, Georgia.

== Detailed service ==
Left Connecticut for Ship Island, Mississippi, March 17, 1862, arriving there April 13. Operations against Forts St. Phillip and Jackson, Mississippi River, April 15–28, 1862. Occupation of New Orleans, Louisiana, May 1. Duty at Camp Parapet and Carrollton until October. Expedition to Pass Manchac and Ponchatoula September 13–15 (detachment). Ponchatoula September 14–15. Operations in District of La Fourche October 24-November 6. Occupation of Donaldsonville October 25. Action at Georgia Landing, near Labadieville, October 27. Thibodeauxville October 28. Duty at Thibodeauxville until December 27. Moved to Baton Rouge December 27, and duty there until March 1863. Operations against Port Hudson March 7–27. Moved to Donaldsonville March 28. Operations in western Louisiana April 9-May 14. Bayou Teche Campaign April 11–20. Porter's and McWilliams' Plantations at Indian Bend, April 13. Irish Bend April 14. Bayou Vermilion April 17. Expedition to Alexandria and Simsport May 5–18. Expedition from Barre's Landing toward Brashear City May 21–26. Siege of Port Hudson May 26-July 9. Assaults on Port Hudson May 27 and June 14. Brashear City June 21 (detachment). Surrender of Port Hudson July 9. Moved to Donaldsonville July 11, thence to Thibodeauxville and duty there until March 1864. Red River Campaign March 25-May 22. Monett's Bluff, Cane River Crossing April 28. Construction of dam at Alexandria April 30-May 10. Retreat to Morganza May 13–20. Mansura May 16. Duty at Morganza until July 3. Veterans on furlough July and August. Sheridan's Shenandoah Valley Campaign August to December. Battle of Opequon, Winchester, September 19. Fisher's Hill September 22. Battle of Cedar Creek October 19. Duty at Kernstown and Winchester until January 1865. Moved to Savannah, Georgia, January 5–22, and duty there until March 8. At Morehead City and New Bern, North Carolina, until May. Duty at Savannah, Augusta, Athens, Gainesville, and District of Allatoona, Georgia, until April 1866.

== Casualties ==
The regiment lost a total of 204 men during service; 2 officers and 42 enlisted men killed or mortally wounded, 3 officers and 157 enlisted men died of disease.

== Commanders ==
- Colonel Henry Warner Birge
- Colonel Charles D. Blinn
- Captain Apollos Comstock - commanded during the actions against Port Hudson

== See also ==
- Connecticut in the American Civil War
- List of Connecticut Civil War units
