= Victor Girardey =

Victor Jean Baptiste Girardey
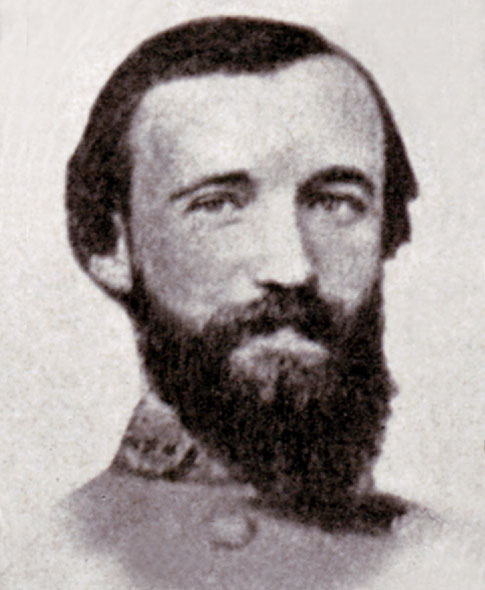
- Brig. Gen. Victor Girardey
- Born: June 26, 1837; Lauw, France
- Died: August 16, 1864 (aged 27); Henrico County, Virginia
- Burial place: Augusta, Georgia
- Military career
- Allegiance: Confederate States of America
- Branch: Confederate States Army
- Service years: 1861–1864
- Rank: Captain; Brigadier General (unconfirmed)
- Unit: 1st Battalion, Louisiana Infantry
- Commands: Wright's Brigade
- Conflicts: American Civil War

Victor Jean Baptiste Girardey (June 26, 1837 – August 16, 1864) was a Confederate States Army officer during the American Civil War. He was promoted from Captain to temporary Brigadier General less than a month before his death in battle. Girardey had served as a staff officer from the beginning of the war until August 3, 1864. Then, he was promoted to temporary brigadier general, to rank from July 30, 1864, and assumed command of Ambrose R. Wright's former brigade on the Darbytown Road on the eastern end of the defenses of Richmond, Virginia. On August 16, 1864, during the Second Battle of Deep Bottom, Girardey was killed in action near Fussell's Mill in Henrico County, Virginia.

== Early life ==
Victor Jean Baptiste Girardey was born on June 26, 1837, at Lauw, France; and emigrated to Georgia with his family in 1842. Orphaned by the age of 16, he completed his education in New Orleans, Louisiana, where he married a Louisiana woman of French descent, Clotilde LeSueur.

== American Civil War ==
Although historian Ezra Warner wrote that Girardey was living in Georgia at the outbreak of the Civil War, and he was later nominated to the Confederate Senate as an assistant adjutant-general as from that state, his first Confederate service was as a Second Lieutenant of Louisiana Militia, then as a Second Lieutenant of the 1st Louisiana Infantry Battalion. He resigned from that position on October 12, 1861, and on the same day was appointed aide-de-camp to Brigadier General Albert G. Blanchard.

On June 21, 1862, Girardey became a Captain and assistant adjutant-general for Brigadier General Ambrose Wright's brigade. Girardey received several commendations for skill, bravery and efficiency, having fought in the Seven Days Battles, the Battle of Chancellorsville and the Battle of Gettysburg. He took temporary command of a regiment during the Battle of Manassas Gap when the regiment's colonel was wounded. During the Siege of Petersburg, Girardey was transferred to the divisional staff of Major General William Mahone. During the Battle of the Crater, Girardey distinguished himself by his performance in organizing and timing Mahone's counterattack after the Union Army's mine exploded under the Confederate line. He led two brigades from behind the Confederate line in order to fill the gap in the line caused by the mine explosion.

On August 3, 1864, Girardey was promoted several grades from Captain to temporary Brigadier General, to rank from July 30, 1864. Historian Mark Boatner says that General Lee made the promotion in the field. Unlike Ezra Warner, historians John and David Eicher do not list Girardey as a brigadier general because his appointment was never confirmed by the Confederate Senate.

On August 16, 1864, during the Second Battle of Deep Bottom, Girardey was in command of Wright's former brigade. The brigade was stationed near the Darbytown Road on the east end of the defenses of Richmond in Henrico County, Virginia. On that date Girardey was shot in the head and killed while directing a defense against the Union Army assault on the Confederate position near Fussell's Mill.

== Aftermath ==
Victor Jean Baptiste Girardey is buried in Magnolia Cemetery at Augusta, Georgia, next to his wife.

== See also ==
- List of American Civil War generals (Acting Confederate)
