= USS Mendota (1863) =

Union navy steamer

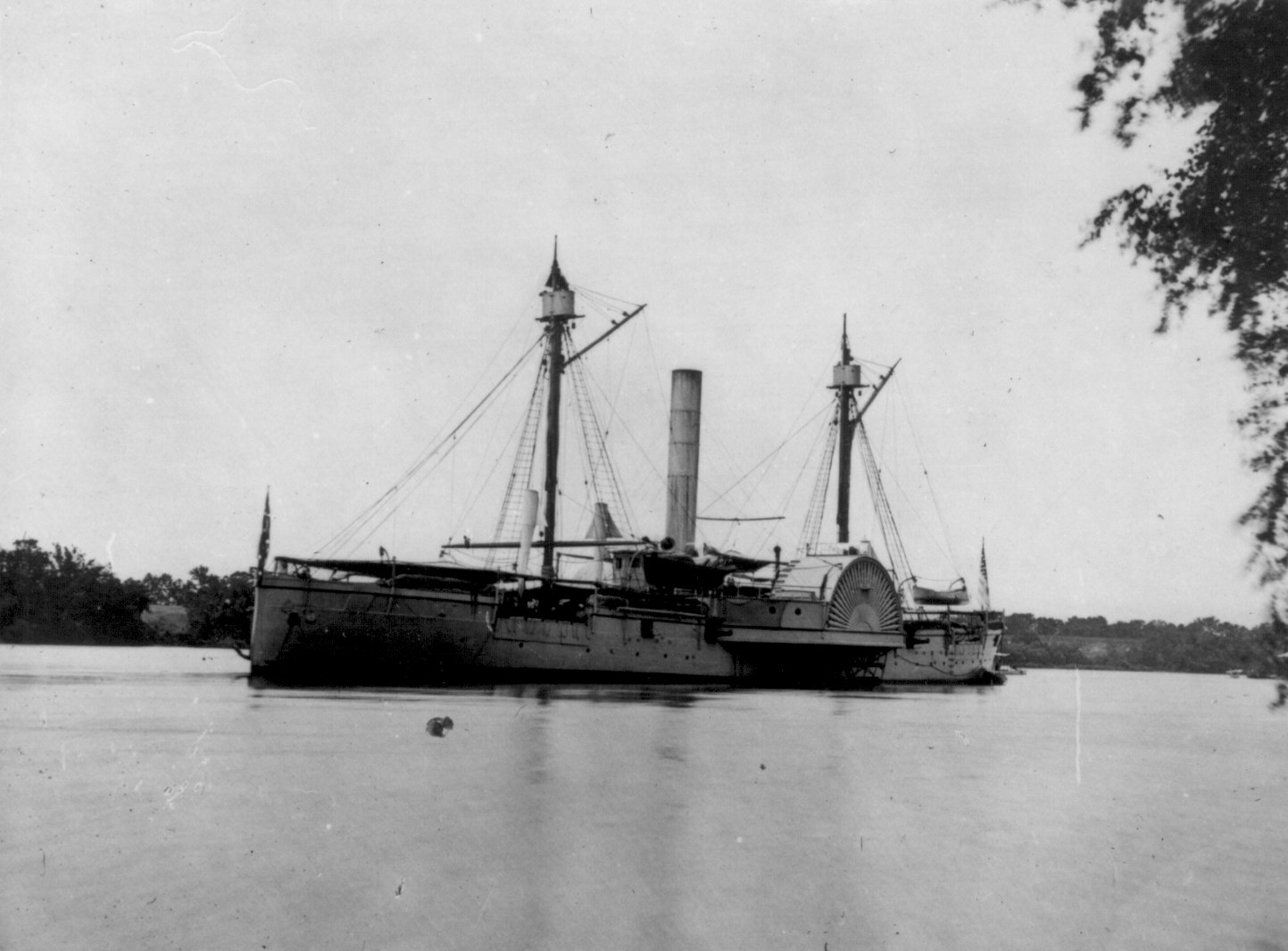
- USS Mendota

History

United States
- Launched: 13 January 1863
- Acquired: 1 February 1864
- Commissioned: 2 May 1864
- Decommissioned: 12 May 1865
- Fate: Sold, 7 December 1867

General characteristics
- Class & type: Sassacus-class gunboat
- Displacement: 974 tons
- Length: 205 ft (62 m)
- Beam: 35 ft (11 m)
- Draft: 8 ft 9 in (2.67 m)
- Propulsion: steam engine; side wheel-propelled
- Speed: 11 knots (11 kn)
- Armament: two 100-pounder guns; four 9-inch smoothbore guns; two 24-pounder guns; two 20-pounder guns

USS Mendota was a steamer built for the Union Navy during the American Civil War. With her heavy guns, she was planned by the Union Navy for use as a bombardment gunboat, but also as a gunboat stationed off Confederate waterways to prevent their trading with foreign countries.

== Service history ==
Mendota, a sidewheel gunboat, was launched 13 January 1863 by F. Z. Tucker, Brooklyn, New York; acquired by the Navy 1 February 1864; and commissioned 2 May 1864, Comdr. Edward T. Nichols in command. From the day of her commissioning in 1864, Mendota was assigned to the James River Division, North Atlantic Blockading Squadron. The first ten months she served as a picket ship near Four Mile Creek. Her guns were used to prevent the establishment of Confederate batteries or entrenchments which would threaten river communications or imperil a small Union Army base camp. Action on 28 July was particularly intense. During her last two months of service, she directed ship movements at Hampton Roads, Virginia, and also at the mouth of the Delaware River. After the war, Mendota decommissioned 12 May 1865 and was laid up at League Island, Philadelphia, Pennsylvania, until sold 7 December 1867.
