= Edward T. Nichols =

American naval officer (1823–1886)

Edward Tatnall Nichols
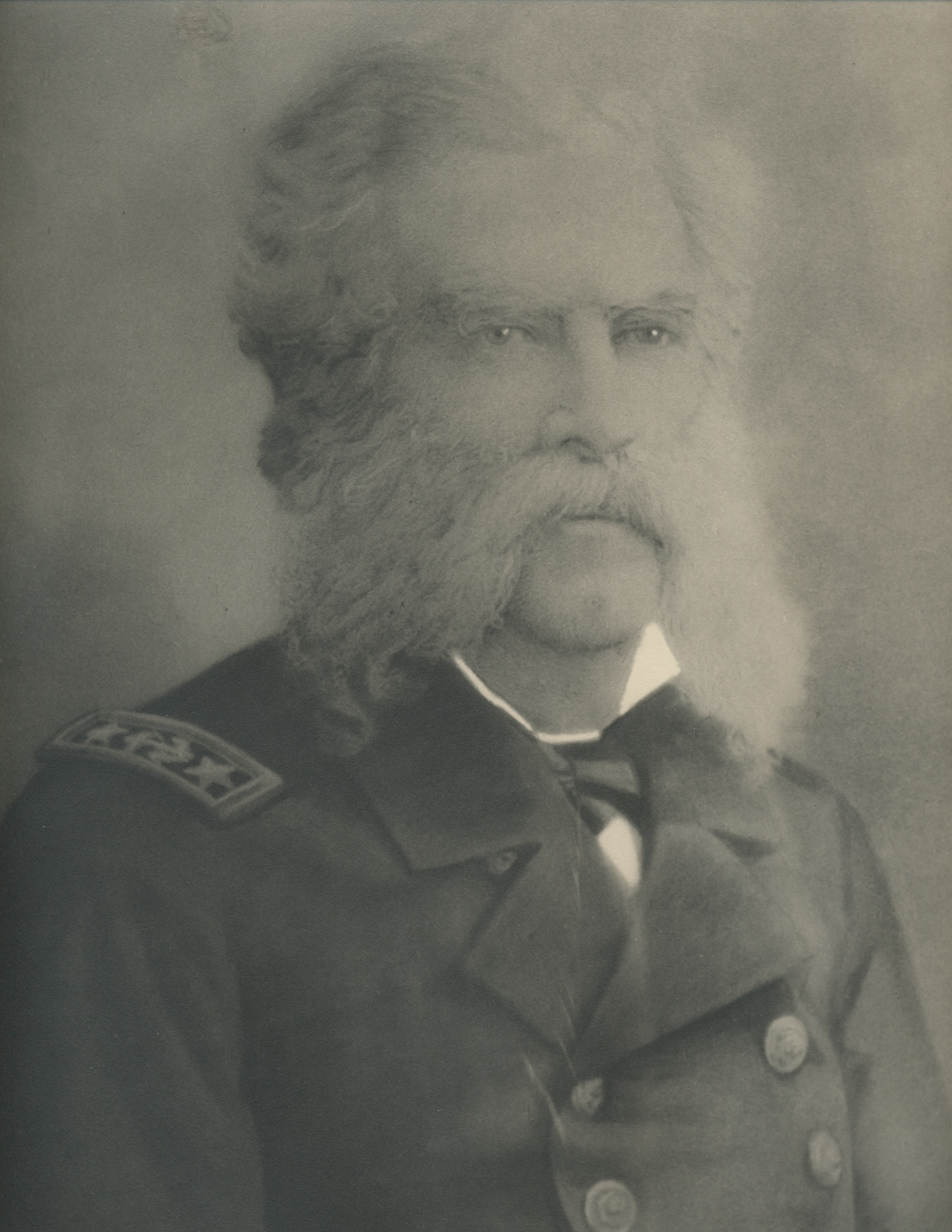
- Rear Admiral Nichols, June 4, 1881
- Born: March 1, 1823; Augusta, Georgia, U.S.
- Died: October 12, 1886 (aged 63); Pomfret, Connecticut, U.S.
- Burial place: Swan Point Cemetery, Providence, Rhode Island
- Military career
- Allegiance: United States of America; Union
- Branch: United States Navy; Union Navy
- Service years: 1836 – 1882
- Rank: Rear Admiral
- Commands: USS Winona; USS Alabama; USS Mendota; South Atlantic Squadron; Chief, Bureau of Yards and Docks
- Conflicts: Mexican–American War; American Civil War: Battle of Forts Jackson and St. Philip; First Battle of Deep Bottom

Edward Tatnall Nichols (March 1, 1823 – October 12, 1886) was a United States Navy rear admiral.

== Career ==
Nichols began his naval service by being appointed to the U.S. Navy from Georgia on December 14, 1836. He was first attached to the sloop USS Levant and served in the West Indies Squadron, 1837-1840. He attended the Philadelphia Naval School, 1841-1842.

Nicholas passed as a midshipman July 1, 1842, and was assigned to the frigate USS Columbus in the Mediterranean Squadron serving until 1844. The following year, Nichols served aboard the steamer USS Colonel Harney in the Atlantic Fleet and transferred to the frigate USS Columbia in the Brazil Squadron where here served until 1847.

He was transferred again in 1847 to the bomb brig USS Stromboli in the Home Squadron, serving with her crew in 1847 and 1848. In his last assignment as a midshipman, Nichols served aboard the frigate USS Savannah in the Pacific Squadron, 1849-1851. Nichols was commissioned lieutenant on March 13, 1850, while serving aboard the USS Savannah.

Nichols was posted to the Pensacola Navy Yard in 1852 and 1853. He again transferred to the Mediterranean Squadron and served aboard the steam frigate USS Saranac, 1853 to 1856. Nichols served at the Portsmouth Navy Yard in 1857-1858, then served aboard the USS Jamestown, from 1858 until 1860.

With the outbreak of the Civil War, Nichols remained loyal to the United States and was given command of the steamer USS Winona. Nichols participated in the bombardment of forts Jackson and St. Philip, receiving the latter's surrender on April 28, 1862. He was then present with the 38-vessel flotilla commanded by Rear Admiral David Farragut during the attack on and passing of the batteries at Vicksburg, Mississippi, on June 28, 1862. The USS Winona engaged the CSS Arkansas and again engaged and passed the Vicksburg batteries on July 15, 1862.

Nichols was promoted to commander on July 16, 1862. In 1863 he commanded of the steamer USS Alabama in the West India Blockading Squadron. The following year he was in command of the steamer USS Mendota of the North Atlantic Blockading Squadron and retained that command until 1866 when he was assigned special duty in New York City. With the USS Mendota, Nichols saw heavy action when he engaged a rebel battery at Four Mile Creek on the James River, June 16, 1864. The Mendota was again engaged at the First Battle of Deep Bottom, being the only Navy vessel in support.

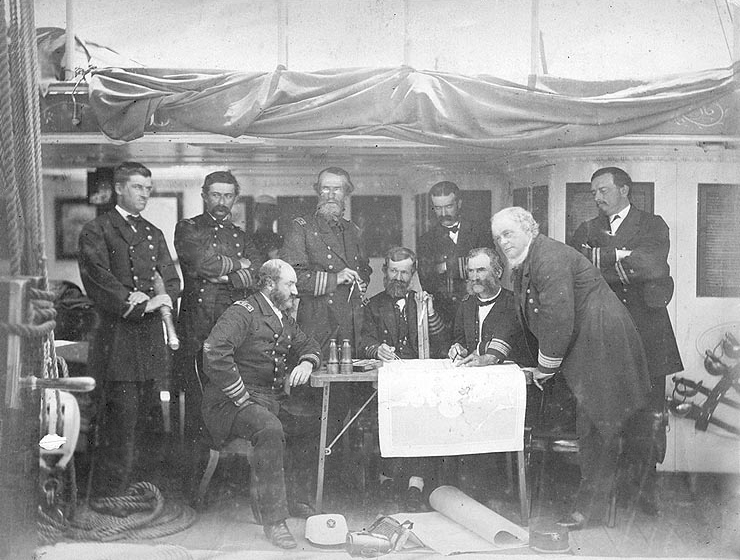
Captain Nichols (seated at right) aboard the USS Colorado, June 1871 in a posed council of war, prior to the Korean Expedition.

Receiving promotion to captain on July 25, 1866, Nichols served on the command staff of the Asiatic Squadron. He was promoted to chief-of-staff of the squadron in 1870 and held that post until 1872. Nichols was promoted to commodore May 24, 1872, and served as commandant of the Boston Navy Yard, 1872-1876. He served as member of the Navy's Board of Examiners in 1877 and commissioned rear admiral February 25, 1878, commanding the South Atlantic Squadron until 1879. In his last years of service, Nichols served as Chief of the Bureau of Yards and Docks (1881-1885).

== Family ==
Nichols married Caroline Elizabeth Bowers (1829 – 1865) on November 12, 1851, in Rhode Island. They had two children: Helen Bowers (1850 – 1935) and Edward Tatnall Jr. (1854 – 1934).

== Later life ==
Nichols was placed on the retired list in 1885. He died October 12, 1886, and is buried with his wife and children at Swan Point Cemetery, Providence, Rhode Island.

== Dates of rank ==
- Midshipman - December 14, 1836
- Passed Midshipman - July 1, 1842
- Master - August 2, 1849
- Lieutenant - March 13, 1850
- Commander - July 16, 1862
- Captain - July 25, 1866
- Commodore - May 24, 1872
- Rear Admiral - February 26, 1878

== See also ==
- Union Blockade
- Union Navy

== Sources ==
- Hearn, Chester G. (1995). The Capture of New Orleans, 1862. Baton Rouge, Louisiana: Louisiana State University Press. ISBN 0-8071-1945-8.
