= 26th Massachusetts Infantry Regiment =

26th Massachusetts Volunteer Infantry
- Active: August 28, 1861, to September 18, 1865
- Country: United States
- Allegiance: Union
- Branch: Infantry
- Engagements: Battle of LaFourche Crossing; Second Bayou Teche Campaign; First Battle of Deep Bottom; Second Battle of Deep Bottom; Battle of Opequon; Battle of Fisher's Hill; Battle of Cedar Creek

Commanders
- Notable commanders: Col. Edward F. Jones

The 26th Massachusetts was an infantry regiment that served in the Union Army during the American Civil War.

== Service ==
The 26th Massachusetts was organized at Camp Cameron in Cambridge, Massachusetts and mustered in for a three-year enlistment on August 28, 1861, under the command of Colonel Edward F. Jones.

The regiment was attached to Ship Island Expedition to March 1862. 2nd Brigade, Department of the Gulf, to October 1862. Defenses of New Orleans, Department of the Gulf, to January 1863. 2nd Brigade, 2nd Division, XIX Corps, Department of the Gulf, to July 1863. 2nd Brigade, 3rd Division, XIX Corps, Department of the Gulf, to February 1864. 2nd Brigade, 2nd Division, XIX Corps, Department of the Gulf, to June 1864. 1st Brigade, 2nd Division, XIX Corps, Department of the Gulf, to July 1864, and Army of the Shenandoah, Middle Military Division, to January 1865. 2nd Brigade, 1st Division, XIX Corps, Army of the Shenandoah, to April 1865. 2nd Brigade, 1st Provisional Division, Army of the Shenandoah, to April 1865. 2nd Brigade, 1st Division, Department of Washington, XXII Corps, to June 1865. Department of the South to August 1865.

The 26th Massachusetts mustered out of service August 26, 1865, at Savannah, Georgia and was discharged September 18, 1865, in Boston, Massachusetts.

== Detailed service ==
Moved to Camp Chase in Lowell, September 23, and to Boston November 19. Sailed on steamer Constitution to Ship Island, Miss., November 21, arriving there December 3. Duty at Ship Island until April 15, 1862. Occupation of Ship Island, Miss., December 3, 1861, to April 15, 1862. Skirmish at Mississippi City March 8, 1862. Movement to the passes of the Mississippi River April 15–18. Operations against Forts St. Phillip and Jackson April 18–28. Occupation of Forts St. Phillip and Jackson April 28 to July. Moved to New Orleans, La., and duty there until June 20, 1863. Expedition to Pass Manchac and Ponchatoula September 13–15, 1862 (1 company). Ponchatoula September 14–15 (1 company). Moved to LaFourche Crossing June 20, 1863. Action at LaFourche Crossing, Thibodeaux, June 20–21. Moved to Bontee Station June 26, and to Jefferson Station June 30. Moved to New Orleans July 15, and provost duty there until August 28. Moved to Baton Rouge August 28–29. Sabine Pass Texas Expedition, September 4–11. At Algiers until September 16. Moved to Brashear City and Berwick City September 16, and to Camp Bisland September 23. Bayou Teche Campaign October 3-November 30. At New Iberia until January 7, 1864. Moved to Franklin January 7–9 and duty there until February 24. Moved to New Orleans February 24–25 and duty there until March 22. (Veterans on leave March 22 to May 20.) Camp at Carrollton until June 8. Moved to Morganza June 8 and duty there until July 3. Moved to New Orleans July 3–4, then to Fortress Monroe and Bermuda Hundred, Va., July 11–21. On the Bermuda Hundred front July 22–28. Demonstration on north side of the James July 28–30. Deep Bottom July 28–29. Moved to Washington, D.C., July 30-August 1; then to Tennallytown August 1. Sheridan's Shenandoah Valley Campaign August to December. Battle of Opequon, Winchester, September 19. Fisher's Hill, September 22. Battle of Cedar Creek October 19. Non-veterans left front October 19 and mustered out November 7, 1864. Provost duty at Headquarters of Middle Military Division and Army of the Shenandoah at Winchester, until May 1, 1865. Moved to Washington, D.C., May 1–2, and camp there until June 3. Moved to Savannah, Ga., June 3–7, and provost duty there until August 2. Mustered out August 26, 1865. Moved to Boston, Mass., September 12–18, and there discharged from service.

== Casualties ==
The regiment lost a total of 249 men during service; 3 officers and 61 enlisted men killed or mortally wounded, 3 officers and 182 enlisted men died of disease.

== Commanders ==
- Colonel Edward F. Jones
- Colonel Alphon B. Farr

== See also ==
- List of Massachusetts Civil War Units
- Massachusetts in the American Civil War
