= 12th Maine Infantry Regiment =

- Active: November 16, 1862, to April 18, 1866
- Country: United States
- Allegiance: Union
- Branch: Infantry
- Engagements: Siege of Port Hudson; Battle of Opequon; Battle of Cedar Creek; Valley Campaigns of 1864

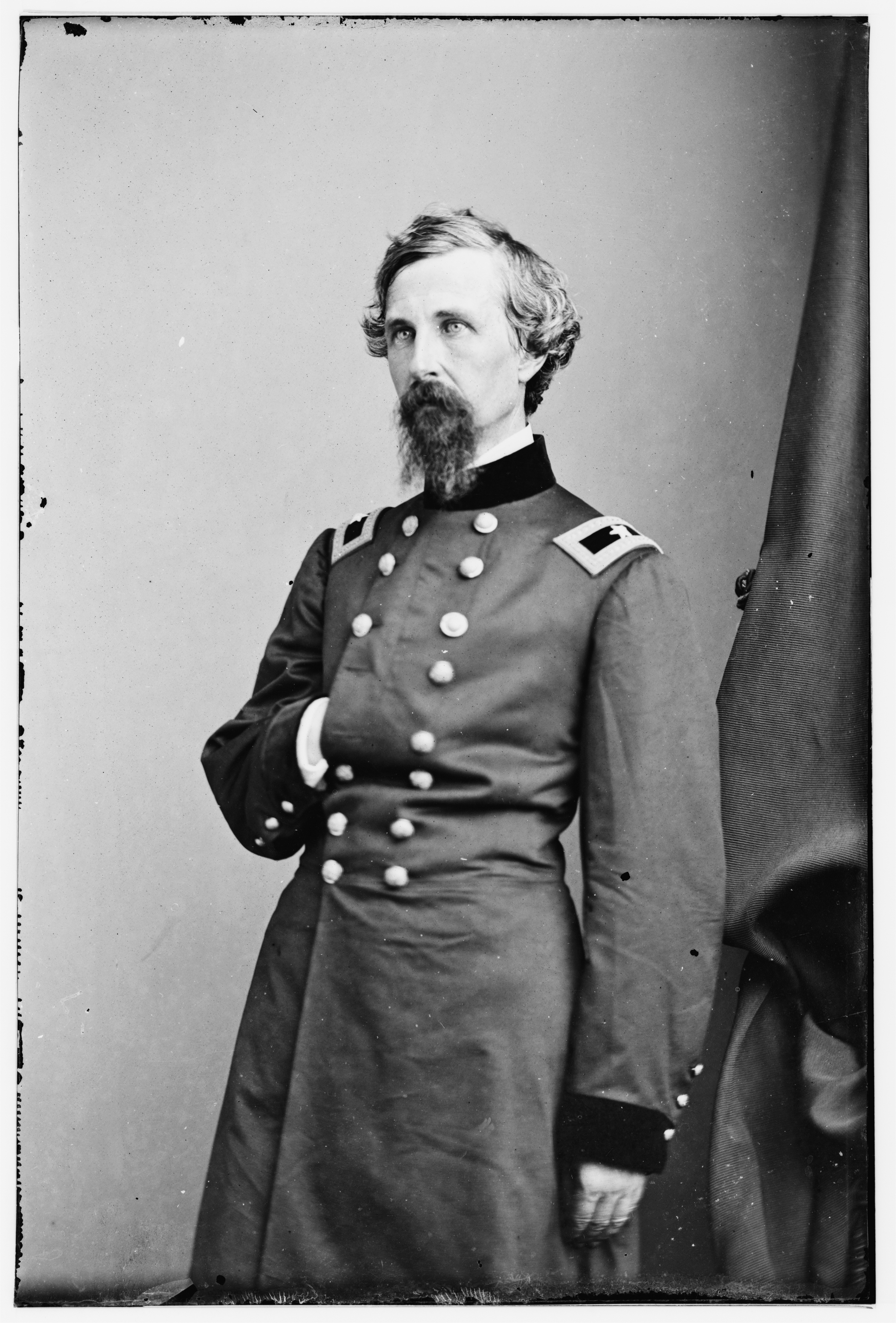
George F. Shepley

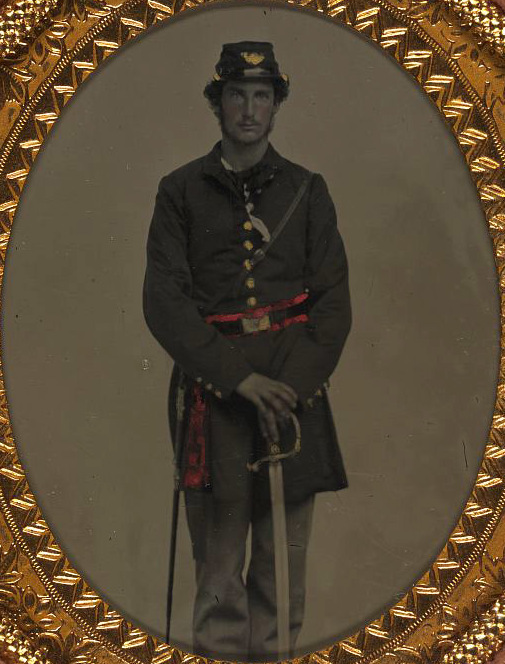
First Lieutenant Jacob A. Field of Company K

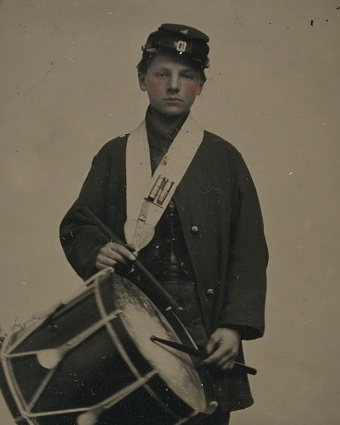
Samuel W. Doble of Company D

The 12th Maine Infantry Regiment was an infantry regiment that served in the Union Army during the American Civil War.

== Formation ==
The 12th Maine Regiment, formed in November 1861, was one of the 10 regiments Major General Benjamin F. Butler of Massachusetts received permission to form.

George F. Shepley a Democrat and a noted Portland lawyer and U.S. Attorney for Maine, headed the new regiment.

On October 1, 1861, Shepley wrote to Maine Governor Israel Washburn Jr. to report that he expected the new 12th Maine Regiment to be filled soon "with the very best men in the State."

Shepley also reported, "I have abandoned every other thought and pursuit, and have embarked in this movement all my hopes energies and efforts and, if need be my fortune and my life."

== Accounts of engagements ==
The 12th Maine in Louisiana

According to The New York Times, "The town of Madisonville, La., on the other side of Lake Pontchartrain, has been captured without resistance and is now garrisoned by our forces. The expedition consisted of a portion of the Maine Twelfth, the Connecticut Ninth, two battalions from the convalescent camp of the Thirteenth Corps, the Massachusetts Fifteenth battery, battery of the United States artillery and a company of the Louisiana Second cavalry, the whole under the command of Col. Kimrall, of the Maine Twelfth.

The 8th of January was observed by a salute at meridian by order of Gen. Banks.

The great Union mass meeting was held here the same night at the St. Charles Theatre, which was crowded from pit to dome, including a large number of planters from up and down the river. Speeches were made by Messrs. Flandres, L. Madison Day, and Thos. J. Durant."

== Significant events ==
1861

- November 16 — Organized at Portland and mustered in
- November 24 — Unit left Maine for Camp Stevens, Massachusetts
- December 22 — Unit in the midst of training at Camp Chase, Massachusetts
- December 30 — To Boston

1862

- January 2 — Embarked on Steamer Constitution for Ship Island, Mississippi
- February 12 — Arrived Ship Island. Attached to Butler's Expeditionary Corps.
- March — Attached to 3rd Brigade, Dept. of the Gulf
- May 4 — Moved to New Orleans and duty at U.S. Mint
- June 16–20 — Expedition to Pass Manchac
- June 17 — Pass Manchac
- September 13–18 — Expedition to Ponchatoula (Companies C, D, & F)
- September 15 — Pouchatoula
- October 21 — Moved to Camp Parapet
- November 19 — Moved to Baton Rouge, Louisiana. Attached to Grover's Division, Baton Rouge, Dept. Gulf

1863

- January — Attached to 2nd Brigade, 4th Division, 19th Army Corps, Dept. Gulf
- February — Attached to 1st Brigade, 2nd Division, 19th Corps, Dept. Gulf
- March 7–27 — Operations against Port Hudson
- April 9–May 14 — Moved to Donaldsonville. Operations in Western Louisiana
- April 11–20 — Teche Campaign
- April 13 — Porter's and McWilliams' Plantation at Indian Head
- April 14 — Irish Bend
- April 18 — Destruction of salt works at New Iberia
- April 20–May 20 — Advance to the Red River
- May 21–24 — Advance on Port Hudson
- May 24–July 8 — Siege of Port Hudson
- May 27 — Assault on Port Hudson
- June 14 — Second Assault on Port Hudson
- June 20 — Thibodeaux (Detachment)
- July 9 — Surrender of Port Hudson
- July 13 — Donaldsonville
- August 12 — Moved to New Orleans, then to Ship Island, Mississippi
- October — At Camp Parapet

1864

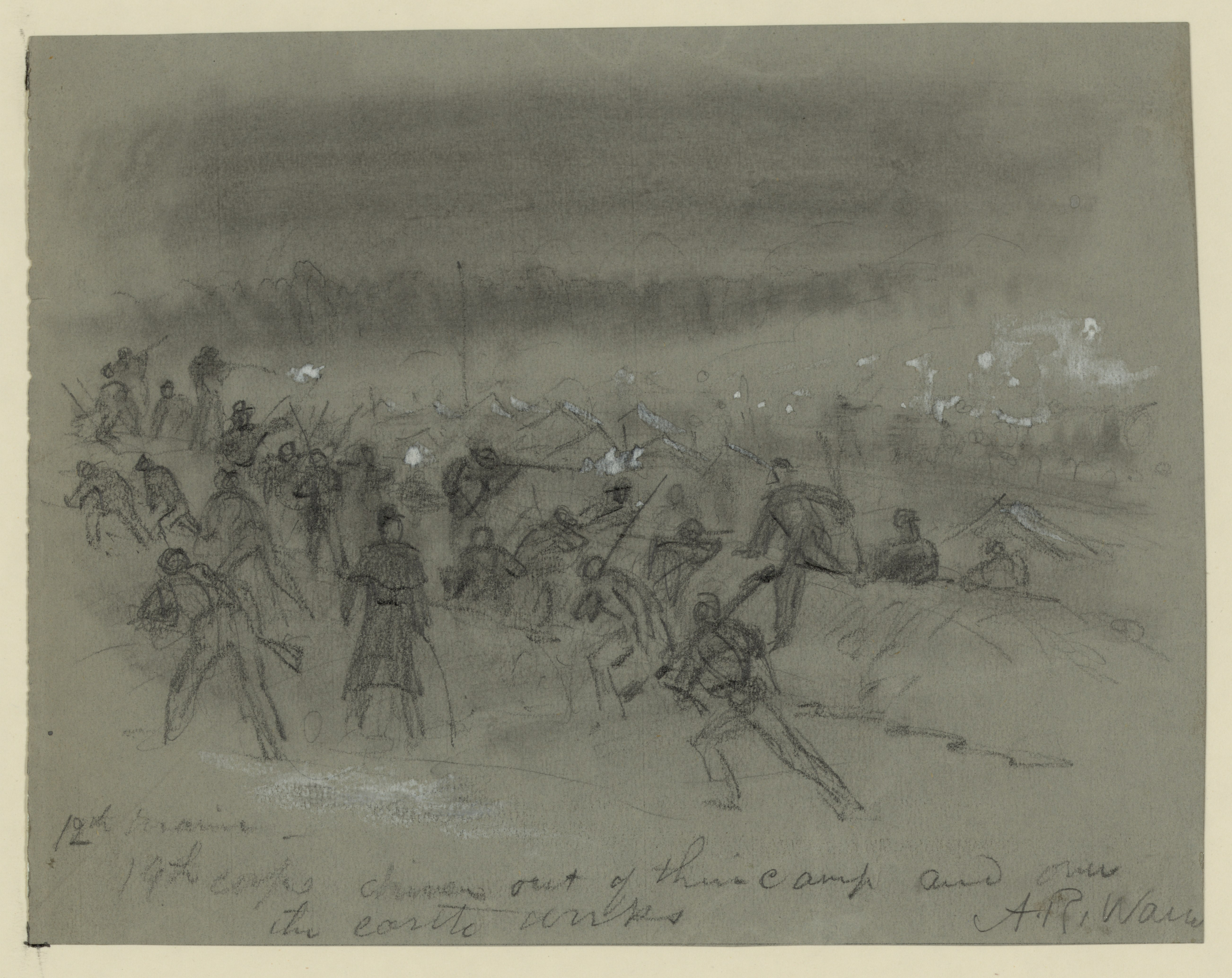
The 12th Maine in a skirmish during Sheridan's Shenandoah Valley Campaign, sketched by Alfred Waud, 1864

- January 3–7 — Expedition to Madisonville (Companies B, F, K)
- January 7 — Capture of Madisonville
- March 11 — Ordered to New Orleans
- April–June 16 — Veterans on furlough, Non-Veterans at Camp Parapet
- May 27 — Veterans returned from Portland to New Orleans
- June 16 — Regiment moved to Morganza, Louisiana
- July 3 — Moved to Algiers
- July 13–20 — To Fort Monroe, Virginia
- July 21 — To Bermuda Hundred, Virginia
- July 21–25 — Duty in trenches
- July 27–29 — Demonstration on north side of James River
- July 27–28 — First Battle of Deep Bottom
- July 31 — Moved to Washington, D.C.
- August 2 — To Taneytown, Maryland
- August 7–November 28 — Sheridan's Shenandoah Valley Campaign. Attached to Army of the Shenandoah, Middle Military Division
- September 3–4 — Berryville, Virginia
- September 19 — Battle of Opequon, Winchester, Virginia
- September 22 — Fishers Hill
- October 19 — Battle of Cedar Creek
- October 20 — Duty at Cedar Creek
- November 9 — At Opequon
- November 19 — Non-Veterans left front. Veterans consolidated to a Battalion of four Companies.
- December 7 — Non-Veterans mustered out

1865

- January — Ordered to Savannah, Georgia and attached to District of Savannah, Georgia, Dept. of the South
- February–March — Six new Companies organized for one year service and assigned as E, F, G, H, I, K.
- March — Attached to 1st Brigade. 1st Division, 10th Army Corps, Army Ohio

1866

- February–March — Companies E, F, G, H, I, & K mustered out
- The regiment was discharged from service on April 18, 1866.

== Total strength and casualties ==
The regiment lost 3 officers and 49 enlisted men killed in action or died of wounds. 2 officers and 237 died of disease for a total of 291 fatalities from all causes.

== Officers ==
Field and staff officers

- Col. George Foster Shepley of Portland
- Lt. Col. William K. Kimball of Paris
- Lt. Col. and Adjutant Edward Ilsley of Lewiston
- Maj. David R. Hastings of Lovell
- Quartermaster Horatio Jose of Portland
- Surgeon James H. Thompson of Orono
- Chaplain Joseph Colby of Gorham
- Sergeant Major John W. Dana of Portland

Company officers

- Capt. Gideon A. Hastings of Bethel (Co. A)
- 1st Lt. Elbridge Bolton of Portland (Co. A)
- 2nd Lt. Charles D. Webb of Portland (Co. A)
- Capt. George A. Chadwell (Co. B)
- Capt. Charles Cutts Gookin Thornton of Scarborough (Co. C)
- 1st Lt. Horatio Hight (Co. C)
- Capt. Elisha Winter of Dixfield (Co. D)
- Capt. Enoch Knight of Bridgton (Co. E)
- Capt. Seth C. Farrington of Fryeburgh (Co. F)
- Capt. Moses M. Robinson of Portland (Co. G)
- Capt. John F. Appleton of Bangor (Co. H)
- Capt. Menzies R. Fessenden of Portland (Co. I)
- Capt. George Washburn of Calais (Co. K)

== Mascots ==
"The oddest pets we have yet seen were two bears, which the 12th Maine regiment of the 19th Corps, led through the city recently. These bears were brought all the way from Louisiana, and have been in several fights. They have become perfectly tame and tractable, and march along at the head of the band, with an air that indicates they feel themselves veteran soldiers of the bruin order, and that they have a character to sustain."

== See also ==
- List of Maine Civil War units
- Maine in the American Civil War
