= First Battle of Deep Bottom order of battle: Confederate =

The following Confederate Army units and commanders fought in the First Battle of Deep Bottom (July 27–29, 1864) of the American Civil War. The Union order of battle is listed separately.

== Abbreviations used ==
=== Military rank ===
- Gen = General
- LTG = Lieutenant General
- MG = Major General
- BG = Brigadier General
- Col = Colonel
- Ltc = Lieutenant Colonel
- Maj = Major
- Cpt = Captain
- Lt = 1st Lieutenant

=== Other ===
- w = wounded

== Confederate Forces ==
=== Army of Northern Virginia ===
Gen Robert E. Lee

==== First Corps ====
LTG Richard H. Anderson

Division	Brigade	Regiments and Others
Kershaw's Division; MG Joseph B. Kershaw	Wofford's Brigade BG Dudley M. Du Bose	16th Georgia: Maj John H. H. Skelton; 18th Georgia: Col Joseph Armstrong; 24th Georgia: Col C. C. Sanders; 3rd Georgia Sharpshooter Battalion: Ltc N. L. Hutchins, Jr.; Cobb's Georgia Legion: Ltc Luther J. Glenn; Phillips' Georgia Legion: Ltc Joseph Hamilton
Kershaw's Division; MG Joseph B. Kershaw	Humphreys' Brigade BG Benjamin G. Humphreys	13th Mississippi: Ltc Alfred J. O'Brien; 17th Mississippi: Cpt Jesse C. Cochran; 18th Mississippi: Ltc William H. Luse; 21st Mississippi: Col Daniel N. Moody
Kershaw's Division; MG Joseph B. Kershaw	Bryan's Brigade BG Goode Bryan	10th Georgia: Col Willis C. Holt; 50th Georgia: Col Peter A.S. McGlashan; 51st Georgia: Ltc James Dickey; 53rd Georgia: Col James P. Simms
Kershaw's Division; MG Joseph B. Kershaw	Kershaw's Brigade BG James Conner	2nd South Carolina: Col John D. Kennedy; 3rd South Carolina: Ltc R. C. Moffett; 7th South Carolina: Cpt E. Jerry Goggans; 8th South Carolina: Col John Williford Henagan; 15th South Carolina: Col John Bunyon Davis; 20th South Carolina: Col Stephen M. Boykin; 3rd South Carolina Infantry Battalion: Ltc William G. Rice
Artillery; BG Edward Porter Alexander (w); Ltc F. Huger	Cabell's Battalion Col H. C. Cabell	Anderson's Battery (Virginia): Cpt R. M. Anderson; Callaway's Battery (Georgia): Lt Morgan Callaway; Carlton's Battery (Georgia): Cpt H. H. Carlton; Manly's Battery (North Carolina): Cpt Basil C. Manly
Artillery; BG Edward Porter Alexander (w); Ltc F. Huger	Huger's Battalion Ltc F. Huger	Fickling's Battery (South Carolina): Cpt W. W. Fickling; Moody's Battery (Louisiana): Lt J. C. Parkinson; Parker's Battery (Virginia): Cpt W. W. Parker; Smith's Battery (Virginia): Cpt John D. Smith; Taylor's Battery (Virginia): Cpt O. B. Taylor; Woolfolk's Battery (Virginia): Cpt James Woolfolk
Artillery; BG Edward Porter Alexander (w); Ltc F. Huger	Hardaway's Battalion [detached from Second Corps] Ltc R. A. Hardaway	Dance's Battery (Virginia): Cpt Willis J. Dance; Graham's Battery (Virginia): Cpt Archibald Graham; Griffin's Battery (Virginia): Cpt Charles B. Griffin; Smith's Battery (Virginia): Cpt B. H. Smith, Jr.
Artillery; BG Edward Porter Alexander (w); Ltc F. Huger	Haskell's Battalion Maj John C. Haskell	Flanner's Battery (North Carolina): Cpt H. G. Flanner; Garden's Battery (South Carolina): Cpt H. R. Garden; Ramsay's Battery (North Carolina): Cpt John A. Ramsay; Lamkin's Battery (Virginia): Cpt J. N. Lamkin
Artillery; BG Edward Porter Alexander (w); Ltc F. Huger	Stark's Battalion Ltc A. W. Stark	Green's Battery (Louisiana): Cpt Charles A. Green; Armistead's Battery (Virginia): Cpt A. D. Armistead; French's Battery (Virginia): Cpt David A. French

== See also ==
- Virginia in the American Civil War
- Siege of Petersburg
