= Lauw, Haut-Rhin =

Commune in Grand Est, France

Lauw
- Commune
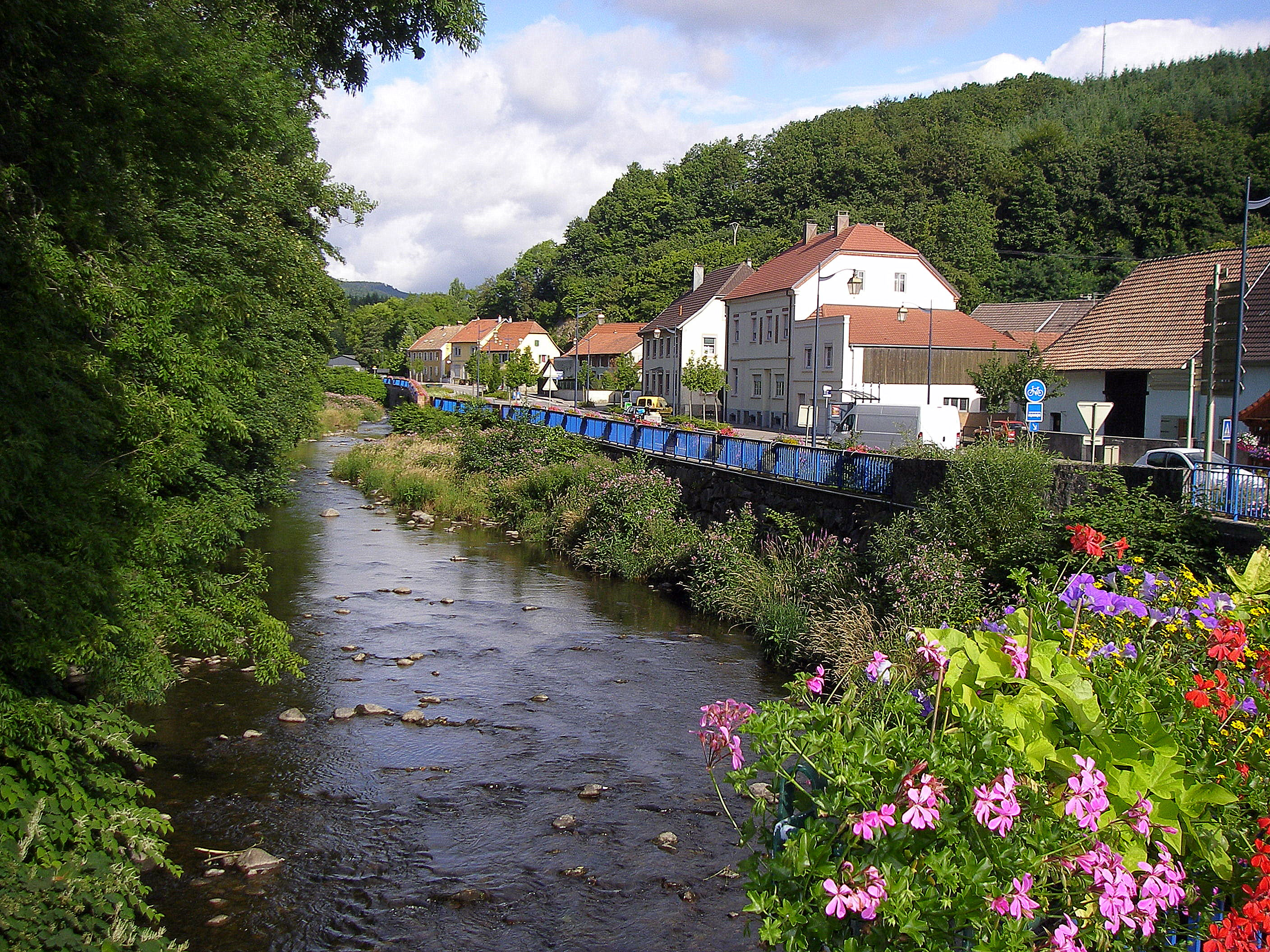
- The Doller riverside in Lauw

- Coat of arms
- Location of Lauw
- Location within France Location within Grand Est
- Coordinates: 47°45′24″N 7°01′14″E
- Country: France
- Region: Grand Est
- Department: Haut-Rhin
- Arrondissement: Thann-Guebwiller
- Canton: Masevaux-Niederbruck
- Intercommunality: Vallée de la Doller et du Soultzbach

Government
  - Mayor (2020–2026): Emile Ehret
- Area^{1}: 4.61 km^{2} (1.78 sq mi)
- Elevation: 380 m (1,250 ft)
- Highest elevation: 720 m (2,360 ft)
- Lowest elevation: 370 m (1,210 ft)
- Population (2023): 887
  - Density: 192/km^{2} (498/sq mi)
- Time zone: UTC+01:00 (CET)
  - Summer (DST): UTC+02:00 (CEST)
- INSEE/Postal code: 68179 /68290
- ^{1} French Land Register data, which excludes lakes, ponds, glaciers > 1 km^{2} (0.386 sq mi or 247 acres) and river estuaries.

Lauw (German: Au) is a commune in the Haut-Rhin department in Grand Est in north-eastern France.

== See also ==
- Communes of the Haut-Rhin département
