= Second Battle of Deep Bottom =

Battle of the American Civil War

Coordinates: 37.4438°N 77.2844°W

- Part of the American Civil War
| Date | August 14–20, 1864 |
| Location | Henrico County, Virginia |
| Result | See § Aftermath |

Belligerents
| United States (Union) | (Confederate States of America) CSA (Confederacy) |

Commanders and leaders
| Ulysses S. Grant; Winfield S. Hancock | Robert E. Lee; Charles W. Field |

Strength
| 28,000 | 8,500–20,000 |

Casualties and losses
| 2,899 total 327 killed 1,851 wounded 721 missing/captured | 1,500; 200 killed 900 wounded 400 missing/captured |

The Second Battle of Deep Bottom, also known as Fussell's Mill (particularly in the South), New Market Road, Bailey's Creek, Charles City Road, or White's Tavern, was fought August 14–20, 1864, at Deep Bottom in Henrico County, Virginia, during the Richmond-Petersburg Campaign (Siege of Petersburg) of the American Civil War.

During the night of August 13–14, a force under the command of Major General. Winfield Scott Hancock crossed the James River from the south at Deep Bottom to threaten Richmond and attract Confederate forces away from the Petersburg, Virginia, trenches and the Shenandoah Valley.

On August 14, the X Corps closed on New Market Heights while the II Corps extended the Federal line to the right along Bailey's Creek. During the night, the X Corps was moved to the right flank of the Union line near Fussell's Mill and Charles City Road. On August 16, Union assaults near the mill were initially successful, but Confederate counterattacks drove the Federals back.

After days of indecisive skirmishing, the Federals returned to the south side of the James on the night of August 20. The Confederates achieved their objective of driving back the Union threat, but at a cost of diluting their forces, the result the Union wanted.

== Background ==
Deep Bottom is the colloquial name for an area of the James River in Henrico County 11 miles (18 km) southeast of Richmond, Virginia, on the north side at a horseshoe-shaped bend in the river known as Jones Neck. It was so-named because of the depth of the river bottom at that point. It was a convenient crossing point from the Bermuda Hundred area on the south side of the river.

Lt. General Ulysses S. Grant began a siege of the city of Petersburg, Virginia, after initial assaults on the Confederate lines, June 15–18, 1864, failed to break through. While Union cavalry conducted the Wilson-Kautz Raid (June 22 – July 1) in an attempt to cut the railroad lines leading into Petersburg, Grant and his generals planned a renewed assault on the Petersburg fortifications.

In the First Battle of Deep Bottom, July 27–29, Grant sent a force under Maj. Gens. Winfield S. Hancock and Philip H. Sheridan on an expedition threatening Richmond and its railroads, intending to attract Confederate troops away from the Petersburg defensive line. The Union infantry and cavalry force was unable to break through the Confederate fortifications at Bailey's Creek and Fussell's Mill and was withdrawn, but it achieved its desired effect of momentarily reducing Confederate strength at Petersburg. The planned attack on the fortifications went ahead on July 30, but the resulting Battle of the Crater was an embarrassing Union defeat, a fiasco of mismanaged resources by Grant's subordinates at a steep cost in casualties.

On the same day the Union failed at the Crater, Confederate Lt. Gen. Jubal A. Early was burning the town of Chambersburg, Pennsylvania, as he operated from the Shenandoah Valley, threatening towns in Maryland and Pennsylvania, as well as the District of Columbia. Gen. Robert E. Lee was concerned about actions that Grant might take against Early. Grant in the first week of August designated Sheridan to command a consolidated Army of the Shenandoah to challenge Early with almost 40,000 men.

Lee sent the infantry division of Maj. Gen. Joseph B. Kershaw from Lt. Gen. Richard H. Anderson's corps and the cavalry division commanded by Maj. Gen. Fitzhugh Lee to Culpeper, Virginia, where they could either provide aid to Early or be recalled to the Richmond-Petersburg front as needed. Grant misinterpreted this movement and assumed that Anderson's entire corps had been removed from the vicinity of Richmond, leaving only about 8,500 men north of the James River. He determined to try again with an advance toward the Confederate capital. This would either prevent reinforcements from aiding Early or once again dilute the Confederate strength in the defensive lines around Petersburg.

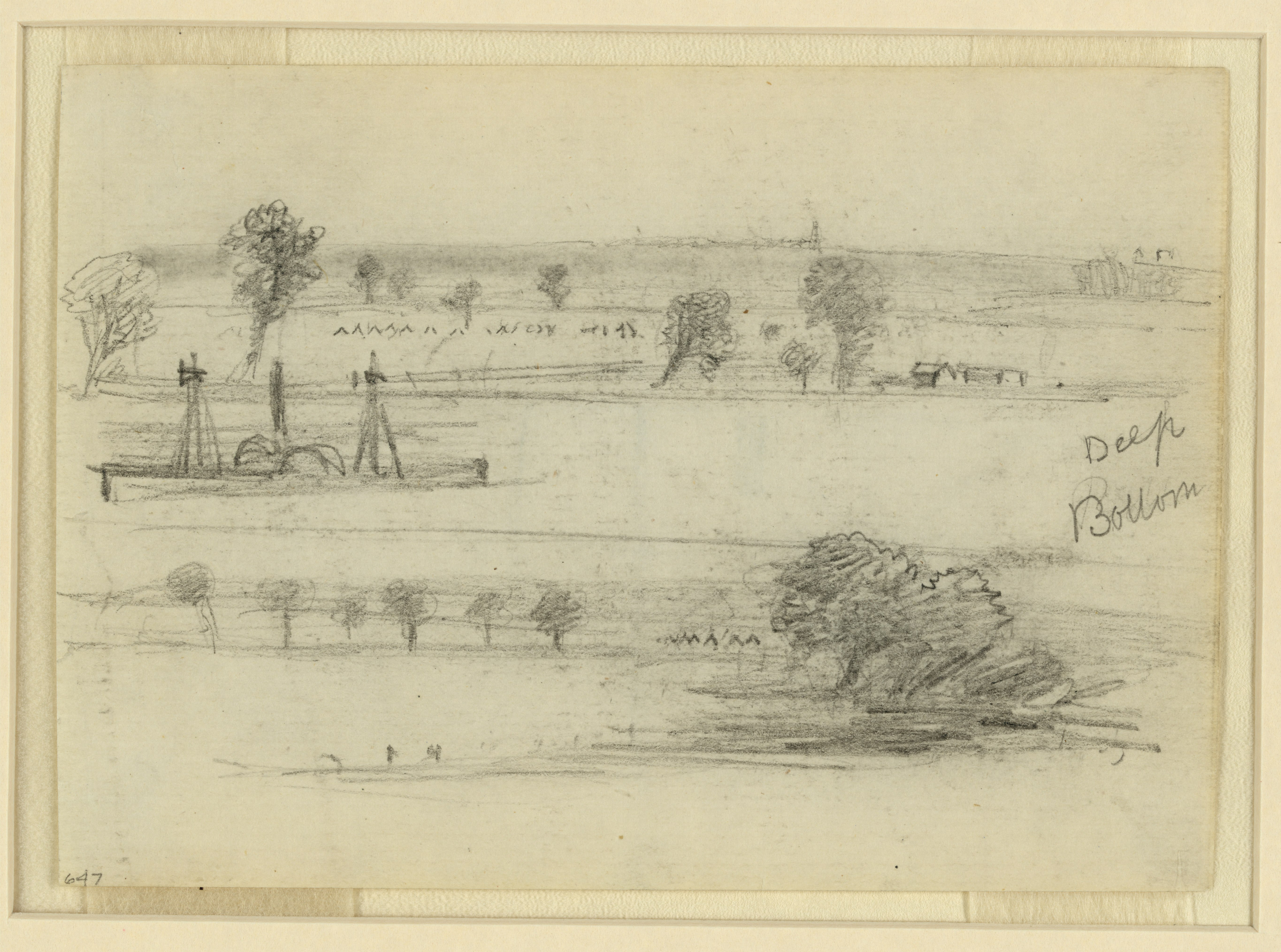
Ship at Deep Bottom, sketched by Alfred Waud

Hancock was again assigned as the senior general on the expedition. On August 13, the X Corps, commanded by Maj. Gen. David B. Birney, Brig. Gen. David McM. Gregg's cavalry division, and Hancock's II Corps artillery crossed pontoon bridges from Bermuda Hundred north to Deep Bottom. Meanwhile, the remainder of the II Corps conducted a ruse to make the Confederates think that Hancock was being sent north to reinforce Sheridan.

After a grueling march through oppressive heat to City Point—a march during which a number of the men were felled by heat stroke—the troops embarked on ships and steamed toward the Chesapeake Bay, many of the individual soldiers unaware of their destination. A tugboat followed the flotilla and brought new orders, which caused the transport ships to turn around and deposit the II Corps at Deep Bottom the night of August 13–14. The landings were not managed well and fell behind schedule; Grant's staff had not arranged for adequate wharves to handle the deep-water steamers.

== Battle ==
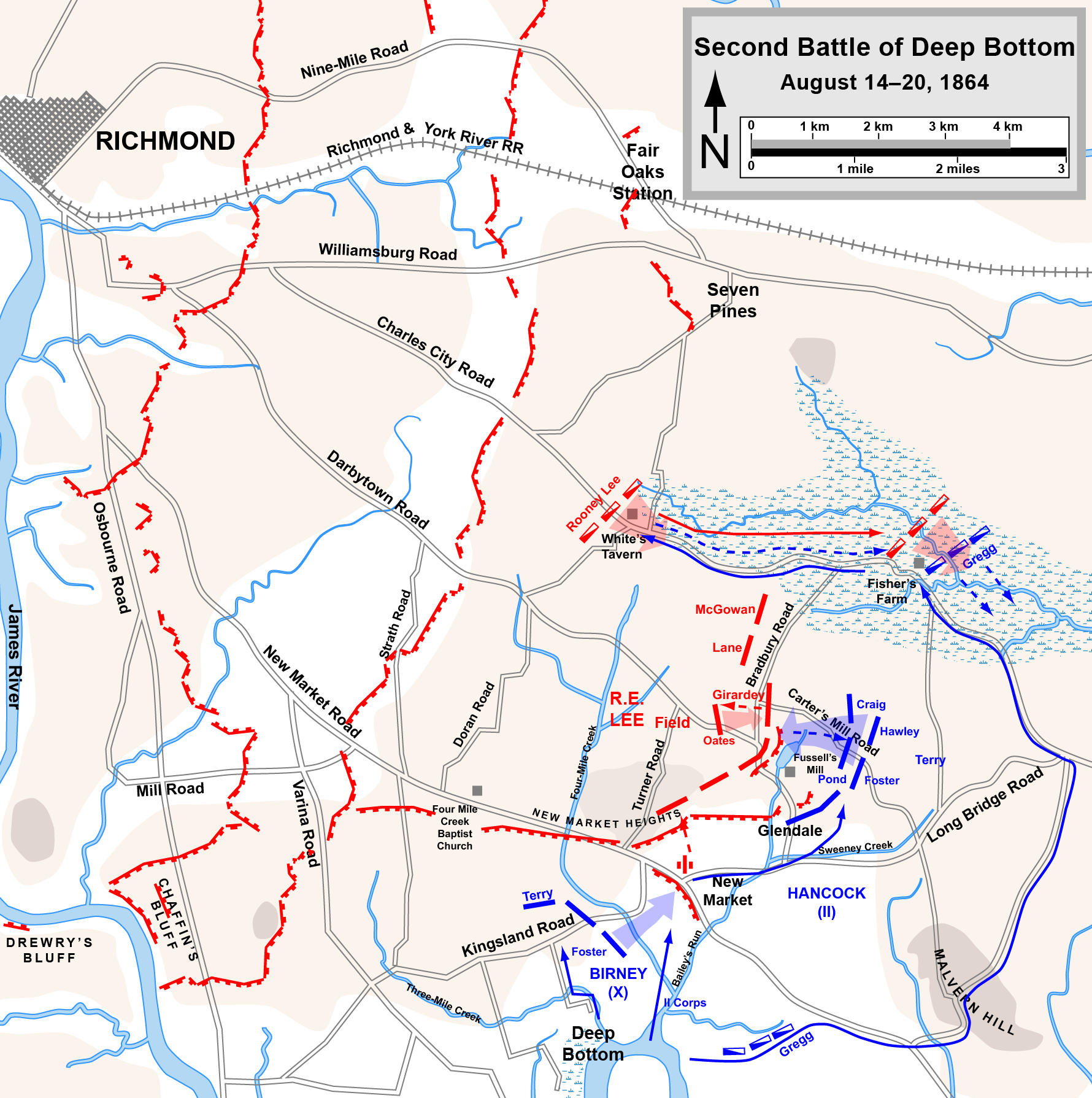
Second Battle of Deep Bottom Confederate Union

=== August 14 ===
After all of his troops were across the James on August 14, Hancock positioned Birney's X Corps on the left, Hancock's 3rd Division of II Corps, under Brig. Gen. Gershom Mott, in the center, and Hancock's 1st and 2nd Divisions, under Brig. Gen. Francis C. Barlow (temporarily commanding in the absence of Maj. Gen. John Gibbon), on the right. Birney was ordered to demonstrate against New Market Heights while the II Corps divisions attempted to turn the Confederate left. Mott was to push forward on the New Market Road toward Richmond, Barlow to attack Fussell's Mill on the Darbytown Road, and Gregg's cavalry to cover the right flank of the army and look for an opportunity to race into Richmond. Birney's troops successfully pushed aside pickets on the Kingsland Road, but were stopped by the fortifications on New Market Heights. The II Corps units moved slowly into position, suffering numerous deaths from heat stroke.

It was not until midday on August 14 that Barlow's men made contact with the Confederates, who were manning rifle pits on the Darbytown Road just north of the Long Bridge Road. The Union generals were surprised at the Confederate strength. In Birney's and Mott's fronts, a full Confederate division commanded by Maj. Gen. Charles W. Field was dug in. Chaffin's Bluff was defended by a division under Maj. Gen. Cadmus M. Wilcox and reinforcements were arriving. Because of Barlow's slow approach in the heat, the Confederates had time to reinforce the Fussell's Mill area with a section of howitzers and Brig. Gen. George T. Anderson's Georgia brigade. Hancock had intended for Barlow's to be his primary attack and instructed him to employ sufficient mass along the Darbytown Road. Instead Barlow formed a wide line that reached as far as Mott's right flank. Because of this extension and the thick woods through which they had to advance, Barlow's 10,000 men in the two divisions were left with only a single brigade attacking Fussell's Mill. Those men were able to drive away two Confederate cavalry regiments from Brig. Gen. Martin W. Gary's brigade at the mill, but Anderson's brigade repulsed it. When Field took Anderson's brigade from his right flank, it weakened the line in front of Birney's corps, which moved forward and occupied some of the Confederate entrenchments and captured four guns.

Although the Union attacks had been generally unsuccessful, they had some of the effect Grant desired. Lee became convinced that the threat against Richmond was a serious one and he began moving troops to the front. He dispatched two infantry brigades of Maj. Gen. William Mahone's division and the cavalry divisions of Maj. Gen. Wade Hampton and W.H.F. "Rooney" Lee. Grant ordered Hancock to resume his attacks on August 15 and Hancock decided to continue with his emphasis on the Confederate left. He ordered Birney's corps to make a night march to join Barlow's end of the line. Although it was raining that night, the oppressive heat continued and more than a third of Birney's men fell out of the column.

=== August 15–16 ===
Birney's movement was delayed by difficult terrain for most of August 15 and Hancock's plan for an early morning attack had to be abandoned. They reached Fussell's Mill around 1 p.m. and Birney spent the entire afternoon performing a reconnaissance while his men recovered from their march. After this, Birney judged that it was too late in the day to attack.

Early on the morning of August 16, Gregg's cavalry swept to the right to Glendale and then rode northwest on the Charles City Road toward Richmond. They found Rooney Lee's cavalry division blocking the road, and a full day of fighting resulted. The Union cavalrymen drove the enemy as far as White's Tavern, but were eventually pushed back to Fisher's Farm. Confederate Brig. Gen. John R. Chambliss was killed during the fighting.

The infantrymen of the X Corps had a better start to the day, as Brig. Gen. Alfred H. Terry's division, led by Col. Francis Bates Pond's brigade, broke through the Confederate line. Wright's Brigade, commanded by newly promoted Brig. Gen. Victor Girardey, was hit hard and retreated, opening a significant gap. Girardey was killed by a bullet in the head while brandishing the colors of the 64th Georgia. Field later wrote, "Not only the day but Richmond seemed to be gone." The heavily wooded terrain prevented Birney and Hancock from understanding that they had reached a position of advantage, and they were unable to exploit it before Field rearranged his lines to fill the gap and drive back the Federals. Col. William C. Oates led two Alabama regiments in the initial counterattack and was wounded. Robert E. Lee had arrived north of the James by this time and witnessed the action.

=== August 17–20 ===
No fighting occurred on August 17 and a truce was called to allow the two sides to retrieve their dead and wounded. Lee planned a counterattack against the Union right for 11 a.m. on August 18, a cavalry attack on the Charles City Road accompanied by an infantry attack at Fussell's Mill. The effort was poorly coordinated and the cavalry was not ready to move until 5 p.m. Neither the cavalry nor the infantry made any significant gains before dark. That night Hancock sent a II Corps division back to Petersburg to man a part of the trench line while other units were sent from there to the Battle of Globe Tavern at the Wilmington and Weldon Railroad south of the city. By the night of August 20, having observed no more actions by Lee, Hancock withdrew his force back over the James.

== Aftermath ==
A threatening position was maintained for a number of days, with more or less skirmishing, and some tolerably hard fighting. ... There was no particular victory gained on either side; but during the time no more reinforcements were sent to the valley.

— Lt. Gen. Ulysses S. Grant

The outcome of the battle has attracted different views. Some have argued that the battle was ultimately inconclusive while others assert it was a Confederate victory, nevertheless also noting its positive strategic benefit for the Union as a diversion. Union casualties were approximately 2,900 men, some due to heat stroke. Confederate casualties were 1,500. General Gregg, Brig. Gen. John R. Chambliss's classmate when they attended West Point, took charge of the cavalryman's body. He later sent it through the lines to Chambliss's widow. She had her husband buried in the Chambliss Family Cemetery in Emporia, Virginia.

As at the First Battle of Deep Bottom, the Federal assault had failed against a smaller defensive force. However, the operation had compelled General Lee to detach forces from Petersburg and Bermuda Hundred to deal with the Union advance, also preventing him from reinforcing Early in the Shenandoah Valley.

== Battlefield preservation ==
The American Battlefield Trust and its partners have acquired and preserved more than 223 acres (0.90 km^{2}) of the Second Deep Bottom battlefield as of mid-2023. The battlefield is 11 miles southeast of Richmond but looks much as it did during the Civil War. The house and land around Fussell's Mill, where there was heavy fighting, has been preserved by the Richmond Battlefield Association.
