= 24th Massachusetts Infantry Regiment =

24th Regiment Massachusetts Volunteer Infantry
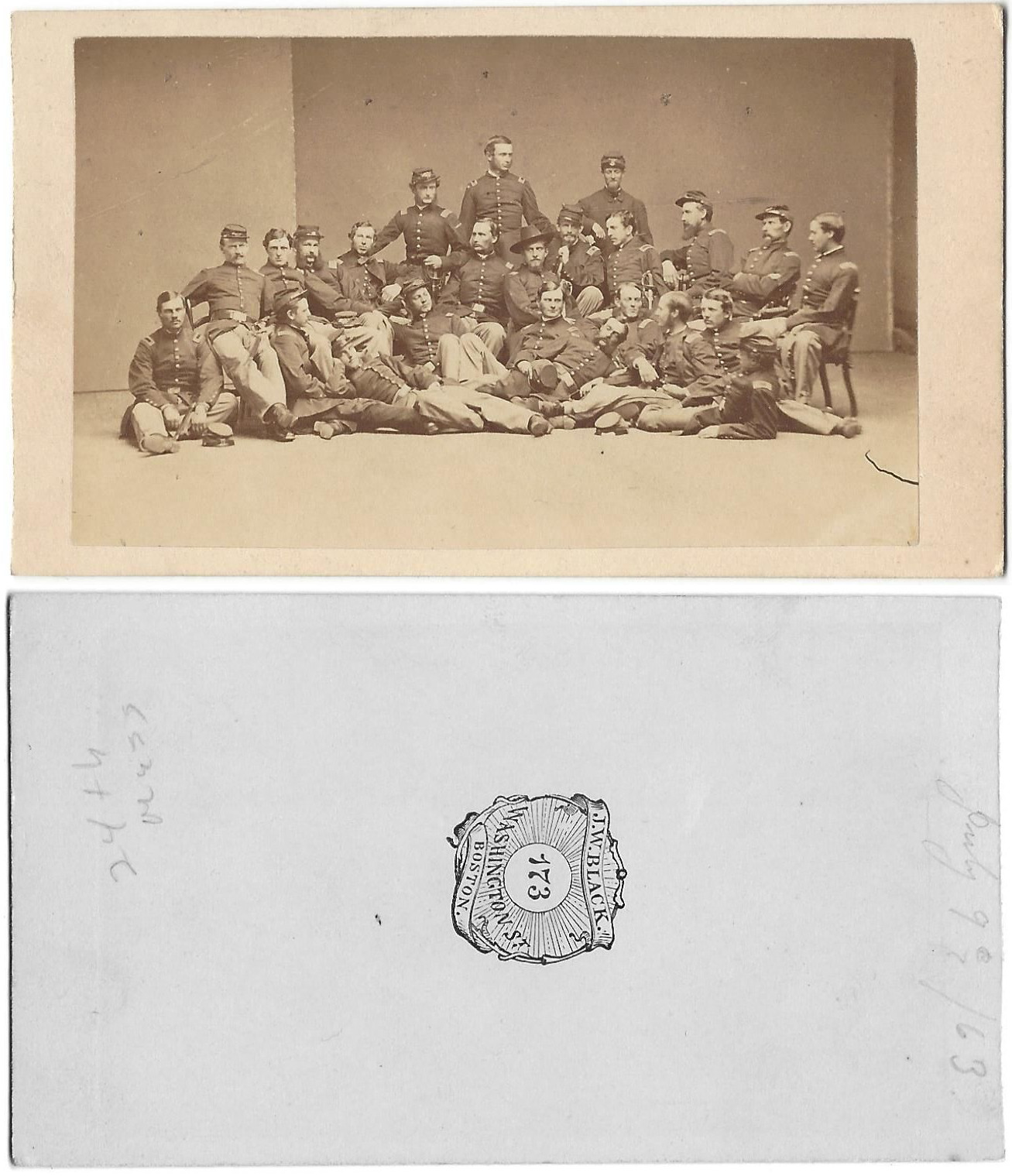
- Country: United States
- Allegiance: Union
- Branch: Union Army
- Type: Infantry
- Part of: In 1862: 1st Brigade (Foster's), Burnside's Expeditionary Corps; In 1863: 2nd Brigade, 4th Division, 18th Army Corps, Department of North Carolina
- Engagements: Battle of Roanoke Island; Battle of New Bern; Battle of Tranter's Creek; Battle of Secessionville; Second Battle of Fort Wagner

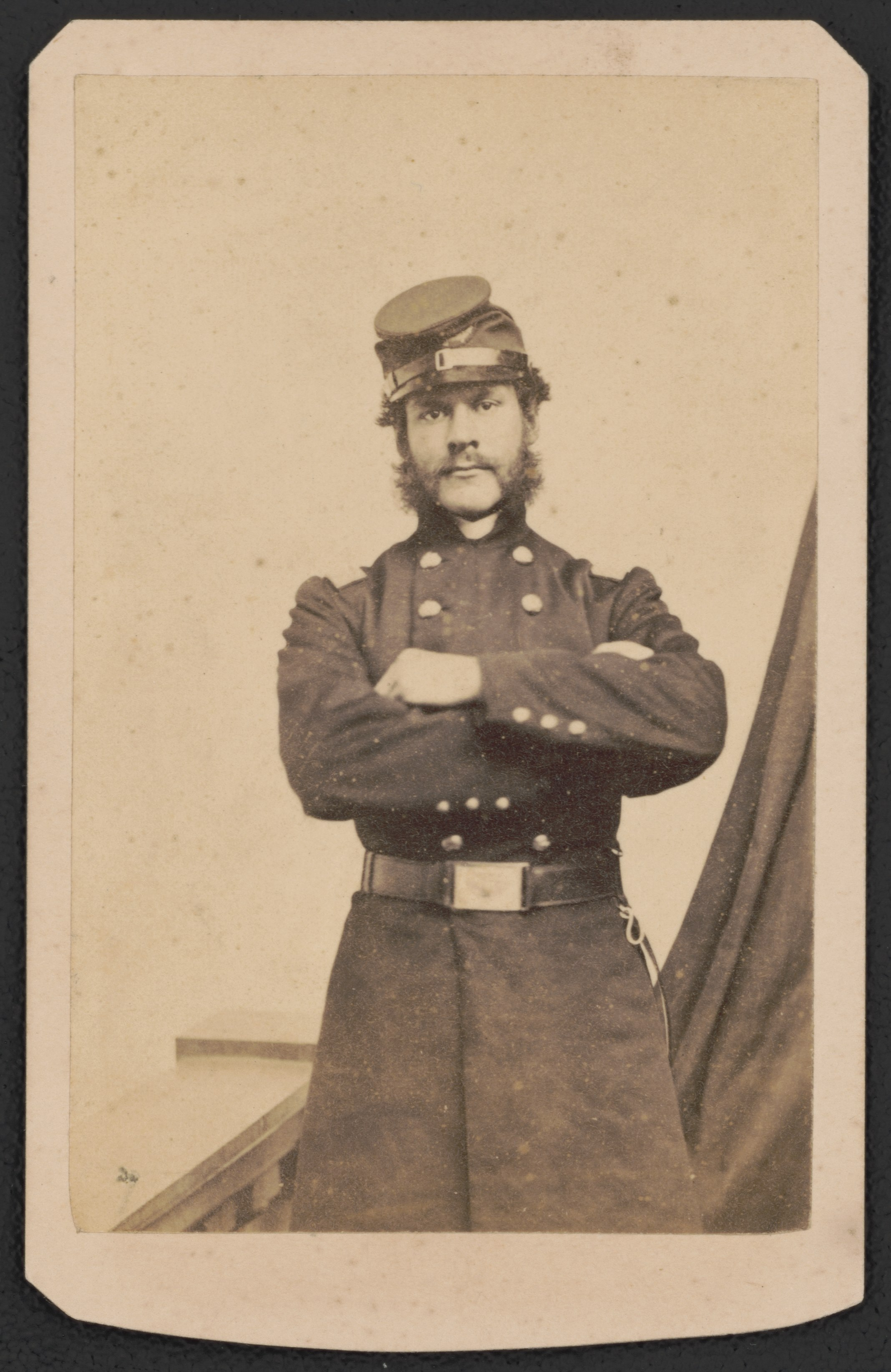
Brigadier General Thomas Greely Stevenson of 24th Massachusetts Infantry Regiment. From the Liljenquist Family Collection of Civil War Photographs, Prints and Photographs Division, Library of Congress

24th Regiment Massachusetts Volunteer Infantry was an infantry regiment in the Union army during the American Civil War. It was organized around September–December 1861 at Camp Massasoit in Readville, under Col. Thomas G. Stevenson. The regiment served with the Coast Division commanded by Maj. Gen. Ambrose Burnside. The Coast Division was deployed in January 1862 for operations on the coast of North Carolina, and participated in the Battle of Roanoke Island and the Battle of New Bern among other engagements.

== Commanders ==
Colonel Francis A. Osborn

== Service ==
On December 9, the regiment left Massachusetts for Annapolis, Maryland and was part of Foster's Brigade, itself a part of Burnside's Expeditionary Corps. The regiment took part in the Battle of Roanoke Island on February 8, 1862, and the Battle of New Bern on March 14.

== See also ==
- Massachusetts in the Civil War
- List of Massachusetts Civil War units
