= Burnside's North Carolina Expedition =

Aspect of the American Civil War

Burnside's North Carolina Expedition (also known as the Burnside Expedition) was a series of engagements fought along the North Carolina Coast between February and June 1862. The expedition was part of Winfield Scott's overall Anaconda Plan, which aimed at closing blockade-running ports inside the Outer Banks. The amphibious operation was carried out primarily by New England and North Carolina troops under Brig. Gen. Ambrose E. Burnside and assisted by the North Atlantic Blockading Squadron under Captain Louis M. Goldsborough.

== Expedition ==
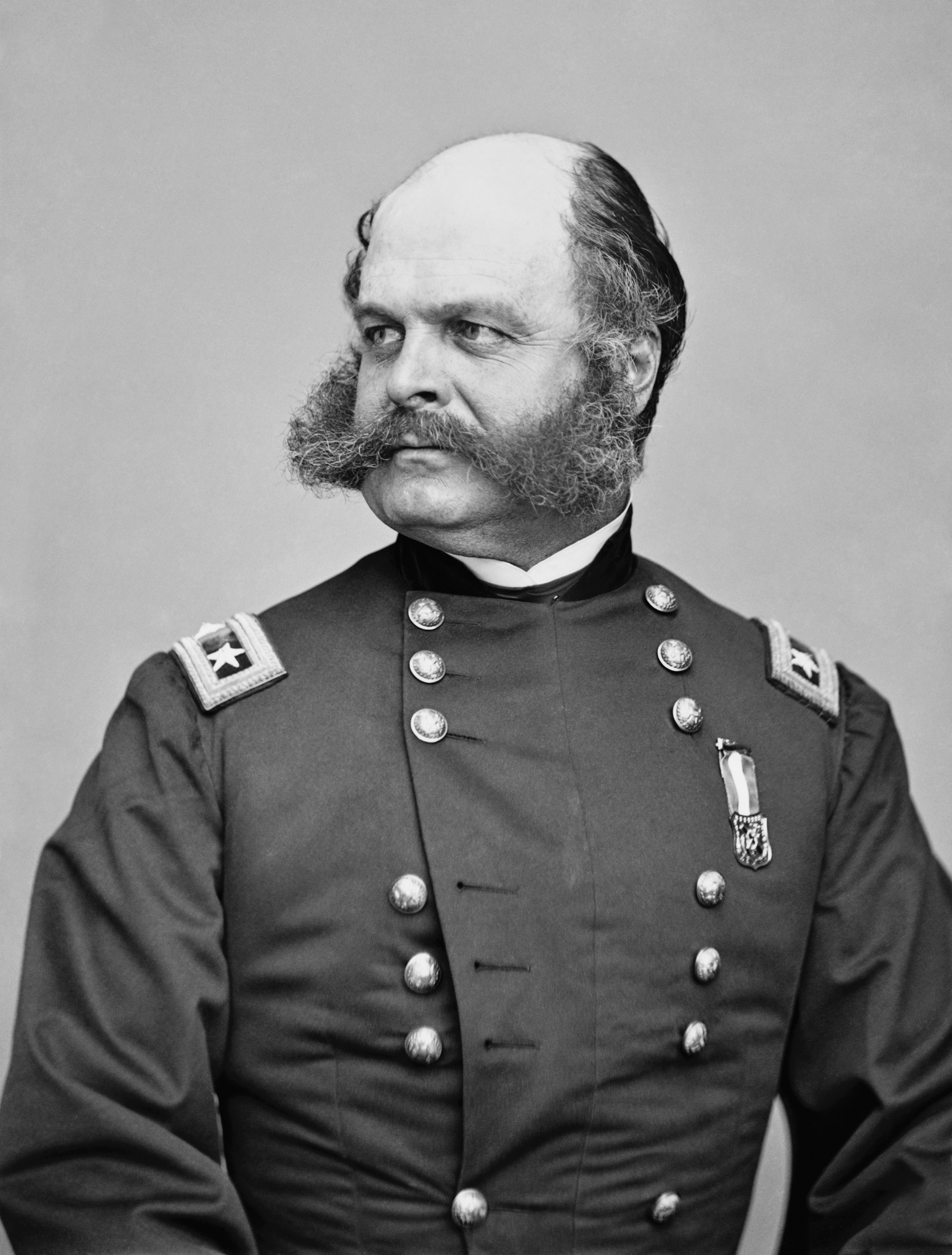
General Ambrose Burnside. Photo by Mathew Brady

In August 1861, Major General Benjamin F. Butler and Flag Officer Silas H. Stringham captured Forts Hatteras and Clark guarding an entry point into Pamlico Sound. It took several months before the Union high command would capitalize on this success. Butler and Stringham were able to persuade the Secretary of Navy Gideon Welles to maintain a force at Hatteras Inlet to keep the possibility of further operations open. The Lincoln Administration did not agree with invading North Carolina from the sea, but General-in-Chief George B. McClellan was in favor of such an operation. McClellan was able to persuade President Lincoln to authorize the operation and choose Brigadier General Ambrose E. Burnside to lead the expedition.

=== Coastal Division ===
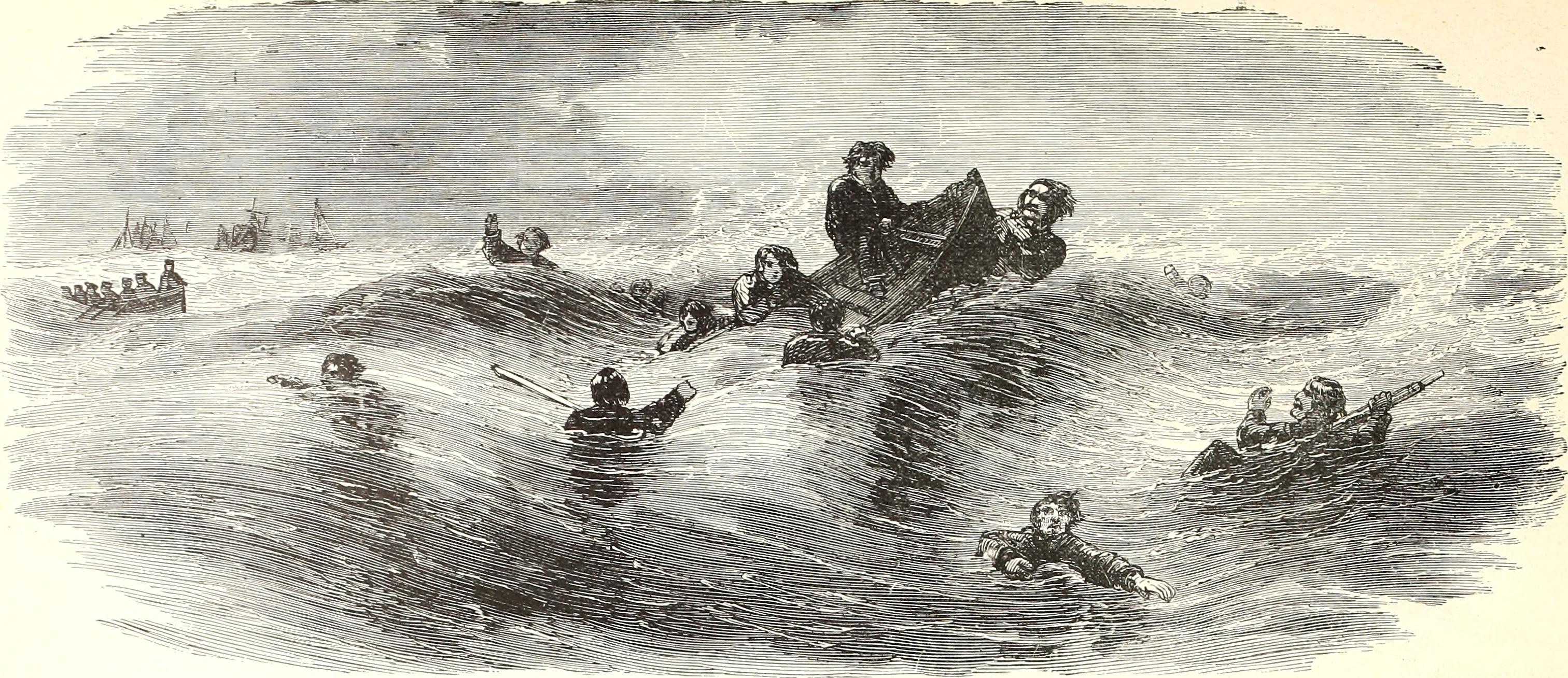
Deaths of Colonel J. W. Allen, Surgeon Waller and the Second Mate of the Ann E. Thompson, on January 15th, 1862, near Hatteras Inlet.

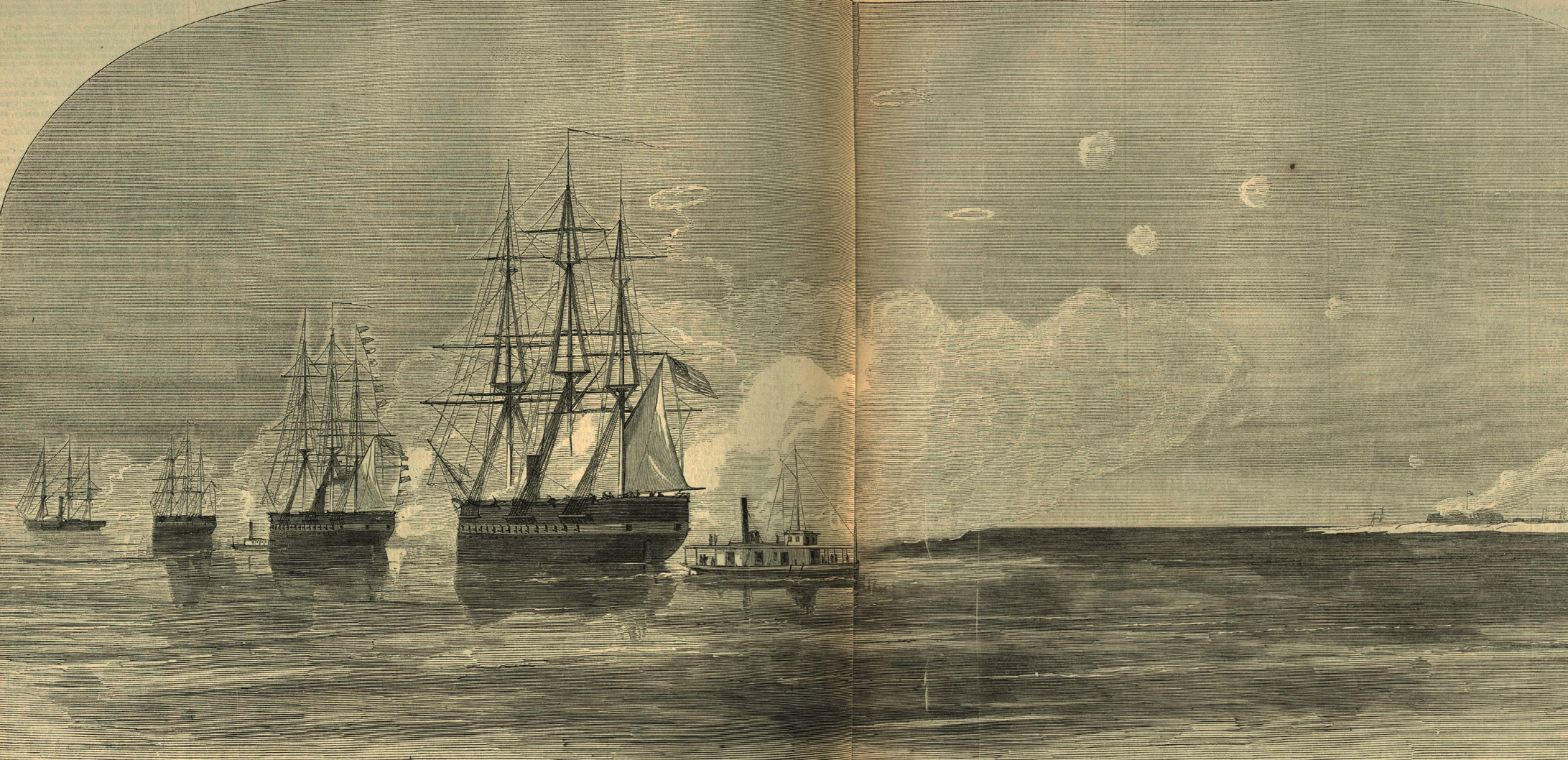
Second Day’s Action at Hatteras Inlet. Shelling Fort Hatteras

Being careful not to ask for reinforcements from McClellan's own Army of the Potomac, Burnside set about recruiting regiments from states along the North Atlantic sea coast intending to make use of their familiarity with the sea. Burnside's army, known as the Coastal Division, was divided into three brigades, each commanded by a friend of Burnside's from his days at West Point. The first brigade was commanded by Brig. Gen. John G. Foster, the second by Brig. Gen. Jesse L. Reno and the third by Brig. Gen. John G. Parke. In January, 1862 Burnside set out from Fort Monroe and rendezvoused with Flag Officer Louis M. Goldsborough at recently captured Hatteras Inlet where the two assembled their forces. Burnside's first objective was the Confederate fortifications on Roanoke Island guarding Albemarle Sound.

=== District of Roanoke ===
Brigadier General Henry A. Wise commanded the District of Roanoke and had a mere 1,400 men and few artillery pieces to defend his district. Besides a lack of infantry and artillery, the Confederates also lacked a significant naval force. A group of 8 work boats were converted into gunboats commanded by William F. Lynch. Wise contemptuously referred to the boats as the "mosquito fleet". Wise pleaded with his superior, Benjamin Huger in Virginia to send reinforcements. Huger declined to give aid but eventually Wise's reserves and a battalion of the 2nd North Carolina from Norfolk bolstered the defenses. The Union expedition was having problems of its own. Severe weather hampered progress so much at times it seemed as if the whole mission would have to be scrapped. The expedition, accompanied by 63 navy vessels, finally arrived off the coast of Roanoke Island.

=== Roanoke Island ===
By the time Burnside arrived, Roanoke Island was guarded by 3,000 Confederate troops under the command of Colonel Henry M. Shaw. District commander Henry Wise remained in overall command of the forces but was confined to his sickbed at Nag's Head. Burnside and Goldsborough defeated the Confederate force and took roughly 2,500 prisoners. A few days later, the Federal navy destroyed the remnants of the Confederate "Mosquito Fleet" which had escaped from Roanoke Island.

=== New Bern ===
Burnside then returned to Hatteras Inlet and was reinforced by more ships from the navy for his next objective, the railroad town of New Bern along the Neuse River. New Bern would also serve the Union Army as a base for any further movement into the interior of North Carolina. Brigadier General Lawrence O'Bryan Branch commanded the Confederate forces at New Bern. Once Roanoke Island fell, Branch braced himself for the inevitable attack upon his command. Branch had about 4,500 green troops from North Carolina. The Confederates prepared a line of breastworks straddling the Atlantic & North Carolina Railroad south of the town. Fort Thompson anchored the defenses along the Neuse River. Believing the main attack would come from the water, Branch's men faced most of Fort Thompson's guns toward the river.

Burnside's main attack did not come from water. Instead he marched his three brigades up along the railroad and attacked New Bern from the south. After fighting along his breastworks, Branch's defeated Confederates fled into New Bern. Hundreds of troops continued on to the railroad depot in town and boarded an outbound train. Branch ordered the rest of his troops to fall back to Kinston to regroup.

=== Fort Macon ===
Burnside's next objective after New Bern was the terminus of the Atlantic and North Carolina Railroad at Morehead City and Beaufort along the southern end of Pamlico Sound. Fort Macon guarded both cities. Burnside dispatched John G. Parke's brigade to capture the fort. Using handcars as a communications link between New Bern and Fort Macon, Parke's forces invested the fort's 500 man garrison under Lt. Col. Moses J. White. While Fort Macon was besieged the Union forces in North Carolina received additional infantry reinforcements, enough for Burnside to organize 6 brigades. Now in command of two brigades, Jesse L. Reno was dispatched to destroy the Dismal Swamp Canal locks to prevent Confederate ironclads from moving down from Norfolk. Reno's division was halted by Colonel Ambrose Wright's Confederates near Camden at the Battle of South Mills. Although the fighting was inconclusive, Reno abandoned the expedition. It was the first setback at the hands of the Confederates during Burnside's whole campaign. On April 26 Fort Macon surrendered.

=== End of the Expedition ===
By June 1862, Burnside had occupied Roanoke Island, New Bern, Morehead City, Beaufort and Washington, North Carolina. Colonel Robert Brown Potter was placed in command of the Union garrison at Washington. Potter ordered a reconnaissance from the garrison under Lt. Col. Francis A. Osborne. Osborne's men ran into the 44th North Carolina under Col. George Singletary. After a brief fight, the Confederates retreated and Osborne returned to Washington. It was a small fight with no far reaching consequences but it was to be the last battle of Burnside's expedition. Confederate President Jefferson Davis's new military adviser, Robert E. Lee, saw the importance of North Carolina and now Confederate reinforcements were pouring into the region. Burnside was preparing for a drive against Goldsborough, his next major objective, when he received orders to return to Virginia with any reinforcements he could spare to aid in the withdrawal of General McClellan's forces after being defeated attempting to capture the Confederate capital. Burnside departed on July 6, 1862, with 7,000 troops and returned to Virginia. These troops would become the nucleus of the IX Corps.

=== Aftermath ===
Burnside left behind General Foster in command of 8,000 troops. Foster mounted an expedition against the railroad at Goldsborough, which he destroyed at the end of 1862. The fighting in North Carolina would then devolve into a series of raids and skirmishes. In 1864, the Confederates assumed the offensive in North Carolina, trying to recover some of the territory lost to Burnside's expedition. They failed to retake New Bern, but reconquered Plymouth and held it for 6 months. The next major campaigns in North Carolina were the capture of Fort Fisher and the march of William T. Sherman's armies in 1865.

== Battles ==
- Battle of Roanoke Island (February 7–8, 1862)
- Battle of Elizabeth City (February 10, 1862)
- Burning of Winton (February 19–20, 1862)
- Battle of New Bern (March 14, 1862)
- Battle of South Mills (April 19, 1862)
- Battle of Fort Macon (March 23–April 26, 1862)
- Battle of Tranter's Creek (June 5, 1862)

== Forces Involved ==
=== Union ===
Before April 2, 1862
Coast Division – BG Ambrose E. Burnside

- 1st Brigade – BG John G. Foster
- 2nd Brigade – BG Jesse L. Reno
- 3rd Brigade – BG John G. Parke

North Atlantic Blockading Squadron – Flag Officer Louis M. Goldsborough

- Naval Forces in Pamlico Sound – Commander Stephen C. Rowan

After April 2, 1862
Coast Division – BG Ambrose E. Burnside

- 1st Division – BG John G. Foster
  - 1st Brigade – Col Thomas I. C. Amory
  - 2nd Brigade – Col Thomas G. Stevenson
- 2nd Division – BG Jesse L. Reno
  - 1st Brigade – Col James Nagle
  - 2nd Brigade – Col Edward Ferrero
- 3rd Division – BG John G. Parke
  - 1st Brigade – Col Charles A. Heckman
  - 4th Brigade – Col Rush C. Hawkins

North Atlantic Blockading Squadron – Flag Officer Louis M. Goldsborough

- Naval Forces in Pamlico Sound – Commander Stephen C. Rowan

=== Confederate ===
Department of North Carolina
BG Richard C. Gatlin (19 Aug 1861–15 Mar 1862)
BG Joseph R. Anderson (15 Mar 1862–24 Mar 1862)
MG Theophilus H. Holmes (24 Mar 1862–17 July 1862)

- District of Roanoke – BG Henry A. Wise (22 Jan 1862–9 Feb 1862); Col Henry M. Shaw (9 Feb 1862–18 Aug 1862)
- District of Albemarle – BG Henry A. Wise (district abolished 23 Feb 1862)
- District of Pamlico – BG Lawrence O. Branch
