= George Hawkes =

George Hawkes may refer to:

- George P. Hawkes (1824–1903), United States Army officer during the Civil War
- George Wright Hawkes (1821–1908), Australian Anglican philanthropist
- George W. Hawkes (died 2004), publisher of the Arlington Citizen-Journal; see List of newspapers in Texas
- George Hawkes, the 1900 Australian shot put champion; see List of Australian athletics champions (men)
