= 21st Massachusetts Infantry Regiment =

American Civil War Union Army regiment

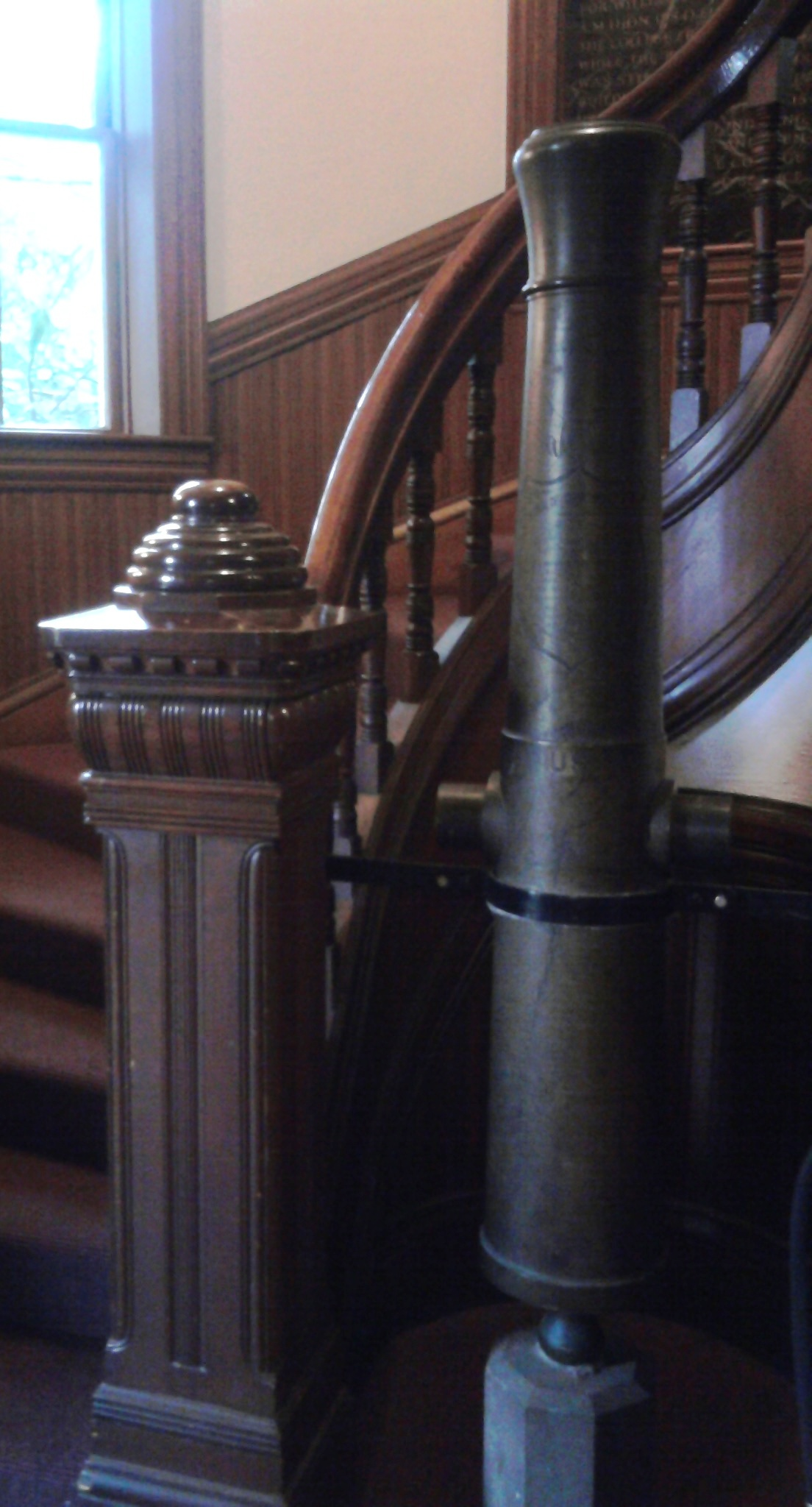
- Confederate 6-pounder, smooth bore captured at New Bern in 1862
- Active: 1861–1864
- Disbanded: October 21, 1864
- Country: United States
- Allegiance: Massachusetts
- Branch: Union Army
- Type: Infantry
- Size: Regiment
- Part of: 2nd Brigade (Ferrero's), 2nd Division (Sturgis's), IX Corps, Army of the Potomac (1862)
- Engagements: Battle of Roanoke Island; Battle of New Berne; Battle of Camden, South Mills; Battle of Groveton; Second Battle of Bull Run; Battle of Chantilly; Battle of South Mountain; Battle of Antietam; Battle of Fredericksburg; Siege of Knoxville; Battle of Campbell's Station; Battle of the Wilderness; Battle of Spotsylvania Court House; Battle of North Anna River; Battle of Totopotomoy Creek; Battle of Cold Harbor; Siege of Petersburg; First Battle of Deep Bottom; Battle of the Crater; Battle of Poplar Springs Church; Battle of Peebles' Farm

Commanders
- Colonel: Augustus Morse - September 1861 – December 1861
- Colonel: Alberto Maggi - December 1861 – February 1862
- Colonel: William S. Clark - February 1862 – April 1863

Insignia
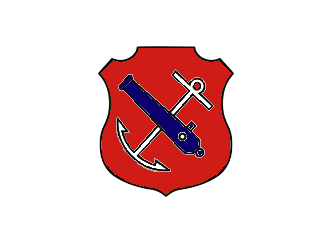
- IX Corps (1st Division) badge

The 21st Massachusetts Infantry Regiment was an infantry regiment in the Union Army during the American Civil War. It was organized in Worcester, Massachusetts and mustered into service on August 23, 1861.

After garrison duty at the United States Naval Academy in Annapolis, Maryland, the regiment served with the Coast Division commanded by Maj. Gen. Ambrose Burnside. The Coast Division was deployed in January 1862 for operations on the coast of North Carolina, and participated in the Battle of Roanoke Island and the Battle of New Bern among other engagements. Burnside's division was recalled to Virginia in July 1862. The 21st Massachusetts Infantry was then attached to the Army of the Potomac and participated in several of the largest battles of the Civil War, including the Second Battle of Bull Run, the Battle of Antietam, and the Battle of Fredericksburg. The most devastating engagement of the war for the 21st was the Battle of Chantilly, fought on September 1, 1862, during which the unit suffered 35 percent casualties. From March 1863 to January 1864, the 21st served with Burnside in the Department of the Ohio, seeing action in Kentucky and eastern Tennessee. In May 1864, the regiment rejoined the Army of the Potomac, participating in Lt. Gen. Ulysses Grant's Overland campaign and the siege of Petersburg. The regiment was a favorite of Clara Barton, the famed battlefield nurse, who was also from Worcester County, Massachusetts.

By the end of its three years of service, the 21st Massachusetts Infantry had been reduced from 1,000 men to fewer than 100. Of these losses, 152 were killed in action or died from wounds received in action, approximately 400 were discharged due to wounds, 69 were taken prisoner, and approximately 300 were discharged due to disease, resignation, or desertion. Those of the 21st who chose to re-enlist at the end of their initial three-year commitment were eventually consolidated with the 36th Massachusetts Infantry Regiment on October 21, 1864.

== Organization ==
Following the First Battle of Bull Run on July 21, 1861 (the first major engagement of the war and a disastrous defeat for the untested Union army), citizens of the northern states began to realize that the Civil War would not end quickly. Additional troops would be needed beyond the 75,000 volunteers that had been called out for 90 days of service. As a result, over the summer of 1861, volunteers rushed to enlist for a term of three years. The 21st Massachusetts Infantry Regiment was among the "three-year regiments" organized after the First Battle of Bull Run.

The regiment was formed during July and August 1861. The designated camp of assembly was the Agricultural Fair Grounds in Worcester. The majority of the companies were from Worcester County with nearly every town in that county represented on the regiment's rolls. Hampden, Hampshire, and Franklin Counties were also represented.

The first commanding officer of the 21st was Col. Augustus Morse, who was involved in the comb making industry in Leominster, Massachusetts and had been a major general in the Massachusetts Volunteer Militia prior to the war. According to Charles Walcott, the regimental historian, despite Morse's decades of experience with the State Militia, he was, "entirely destitute of soldierly enthusiasm or spirit, wonderfully ignorant of military drill and maneuvres, and a wretched disciplinarian."

== Operations ==
=== Initial deployment ===
The regiment, originally numbering slightly more than 1,000 men, departed Worcester on August 23, 1861. They were armed with inferior smoothbore muskets that had been converted from flintlock to percussion lock. After a brief, but tense, three-day encampment in Baltimore, the regiment moved to the United States Naval Academy in Annapolis, Maryland, arriving on August 30. The regiment garrisoned the Naval Academy for four months. It was a comfortable post. Maj. William S. Clark of the 21st wrote that the regiment was "delightfully situated, enjoying the very romance of war."

During their stay in Annapolis, the men of 21st assisted in the escape of a slave belonging to Maryland Governor Thomas Holliday Hicks. While the slave was hidden in a chimney in one of the Naval Academy barracks, Governor Hicks's repeated demands for his return were refused by the officers of the regiment.

On December 20, 1861, the 21st was assigned to the Coast Division commanded by Maj. Gen. Ambrose Burnside for operations in North Carolina. The 21st was the first regiment selected by Brig. Gen. Jesse Reno for his brigade. The 21st Massachusetts Infantry would gain a great respect and affection for Reno, who first led their brigade and later the IX Corps of which the 21st was a part.

=== North Carolina ===
As the regiment prepared for departure, Colonel Augustus Morse decided to remain at the Naval Academy, feeling that garrison duty was, according to historian James Bowen, "more to his taste." Lt. Col. Albert Maggi, an Italian by birth who had served under Giuseppe Garibaldi, took command of the regiment on January 2, 1862. Maggi had been openly insubordinate to Morse due to the latter's lack of military discipline. His assumption of command, as well as the issue of new Enfield rifled muskets, improved the morale of the regiment.

The 21st, about 960 strong, boarded the steamer Northerner on January 6, 1862. The fleet transporting Burnside's North Carolina Expedition encountered harsh weather off the coast of Cape Hatteras. Prolonged poor weather and the shallowness of Hatteras Inlet resulted in weeks of delay as the fleet struggled to enter Pamlico Sound. Finally, just as most of the vessels began to run low on potable water, the fleet entered the sound and made for Roanoke Island on February 5, 1862.

==== Battle of Roanoke Island ====
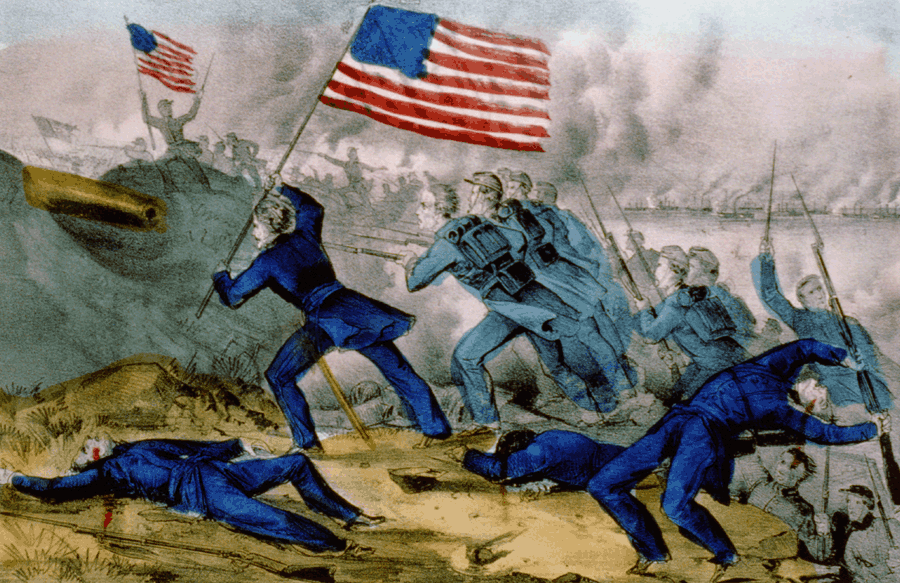
Currier and Ives print of the Battle of Roanoke Island

Maj. Gen. George B. McClellan had ordered Burnside to make Roanoke Island his first target. Capture of the island would allow control of both Pamlico and Albemarle Sounds, opening up a possible southern invasion route to Richmond. Coordinating with a naval flotilla commanded by Admiral Louis M. Goldsborough, Burnside launched an amphibious assault (one of the first of the Civil War) resulting in the Battle of Roanoke Island on February 7 and 8, 1862. After landing, the 21st spent a cold, wet night on picket duty. On February 8, it joined in the assault on the Confederate fort at the center of the island. Moving through swamps and knee-deep water, Reno's brigade, including the 21st, advanced around the Union left flank on the west side of the fort. After firing steadily on the fort for some time and taking moderate casualties, the 21st was ordered by Brig. Gen. Reno to storm the fort. According to the regimental historian, the 21st Massachusetts Infantry was the first regiment to mount the earthworks of the fort; however, the honor was also claimed by the 9th New York Infantry Regiment. The Union forces were victorious in capturing the Confederate fort on Roanoke Island and took approximately 2,500 Confederate soldiers prisoner. The 21st suffered 13 killed and 44 wounded, or eight percent casualties, during the engagement.

After the battle, the 21st took up camp in the former Confederate fort, remaining there for nearly a month. During that time, Lt. Col. Maggi, determined to make the 21st as disciplined as a regiment of Regulars, enforced stern standards for drill and dress parades. After the near mutiny of one company, Maggi submitted his resignation. Maj. William S. Clark, a professor of chemistry at Amherst College, was promoted to lieutenant colonel and assumed command of the regiment on February 28, 1862.

==== Battle of New Bern ====
Burnside's next target, according to McClellan's orders, was the city of New Bern, North Carolina. The Coast Division boarded their transports on March 4, made their way up the Neuse River, and disembarked about 16 miles (26 km) down river of New Bern on March 12. The 21st, numbering 675 men, led their brigade in the march on New Bern, discovering many abandoned fortifications. On March 14, the division participated in the Battle of New Bern. The Confederate defenses were roughly centered on a brick yard converted into a makeshift fort. The 21st, approaching the enemy position, was soon ordered to assault the brick yard and the battery therein. Lt. Col. Clark led four companies of the 21st and temporarily occupied the brick yard. As they captured the battery, Clark stood atop one of the guns, urging his men forward. In their advanced position, the 21st suffered significant casualties and was soon forced to abandon the brickyard. However, the Union forces were eventually victorious, and the city of New Bern was captured. After the battle, Maj. Gen. Burnside presented the first cannon captured by the 21st to Amherst College in honor of 1st Lt. Frazar Stearns, son of the President of Amherst College, and adjutant of the 21st, who was killed during the engagement. Lt. Col. Clark received a promotion to colonel for his conduct during the Battle of New Bern. The regiment suffered 58 casualties, or eight percent (23 killed, 35 wounded).

==== Battle of Camden ====
Following the engagement at New Bern, the 21st was among the regiments selected for an expedition to destroy the Dismal Swamp Canal which would cripple the Confederacy's shipbuilding activities at Norfolk, Virginia. A portion of Reno's brigade was transported by steamers to Camden County and engaged in the relatively minor Battle of Camden on April 19, 1862. The 21st, at this stage, numbered 500 men, having lost numerous soldiers to disease while in an unsanitary camp at New Bern. After the Battle of Camden, Reno eventually abandoned the expedition against the canal and the brigade returned to New Bern on April 22. In the course of the mission, the 21st Massachusetts Infantry had light casualties of three percent (four killed, 11 wounded, and one missing).

=== Northern Virginia Campaign ===
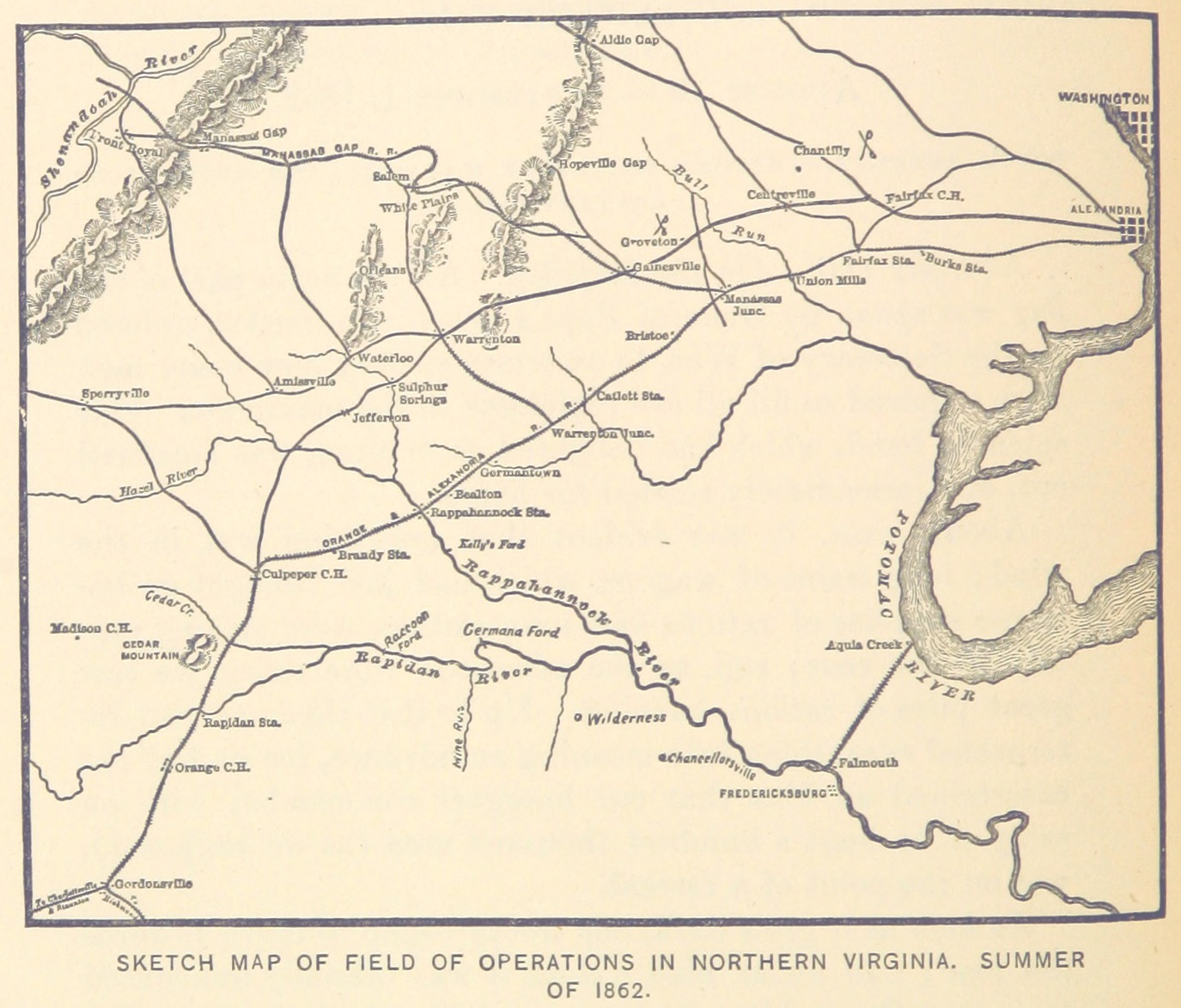
Field of operations for the 21st Regiment in the Summer of 1862

The Coast Division's next assignment was supposed to be the capture of Wilmington, North Carolina. However, the failure of McClellan's Peninsular Campaign required the recall of the Coast Division to Virginia. The 21st broke their camp in New Bern and boarded schooners on July 2, 1862, while hearing conflicting rumors of McClellan's success or defeat. They arrived in Newport News, Virginia, on July 9.

During July, two additional divisions were consolidated under Maj. Gen. Burnside's command to form the IX Corps. At the beginning of August, Brig. Gen Jesse Reno assumed the command of the Corps and was ordered to support the advance of Maj. Gen. John Pope's Army of Virginia towards Richmond. The 21st, along with the rest of the Corps, was quickly transported to Fredericksburg and then marched overland to join Pope's forces on August 14, 1862, in the vicinity of Culpeper Court House, Virginia.

As Gen. Robert E. Lee advanced on Pope's position along the Rapidan River, Pope quickly withdrew his army north. The brigade to which the 21st belonged, now commanded by Col. Edward Ferrero, frequently found itself in the position of rear guard during this movement, skirmishing with the advancing Confederate cavalry. By the time the 21st reached Warrenton, Virginia, on August 27, it was clear to the men that something was wrong. Pope was seen riding by the regiment, "looking warm and excited", and the men learned that Lt. Gen. Thomas Jackson had flanked the Union army and was now in their rear.

==== Second Battle of Bull Run ====
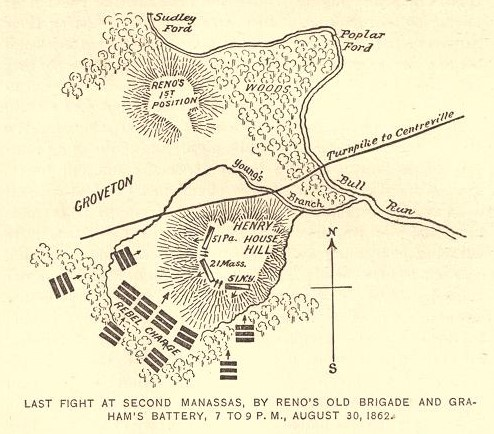
Position of Ferrero's Brigade during Union rear guard action at Henry House Hill

The 21st, now numbering 425 men, crossed Bull Run on August 29 and discovered that Union forces had already engaged Jackson's men in the Second Battle of Bull Run. Just after noon, the 21st's brigade took up a position near the center of the Union lines. Over the course of the afternoon, they witnessed several brigades advance into the woods in their front only to see them beaten back by the Confederates. Finally, the order came for Ferrero's brigade, including the 21st, to advance, unsupported, into the woods. As the brigade stepped off, Brig. Gen. Reno ordered it to halt and personally protested the order to Maj. Gen. Pope. The order was rescinded and, according to Capt. Walcott of the 21st, "we thanked God that General Reno stood between us and General Pope."

After resting on their arms through the night, the 21st awoke to light fighting in their front. Over the course of the morning, Union forces gradually shifted to the left, including the 21st, and it became apparent that the Union right flank had collapsed. Meanwhile, Lee's forces had joined Jackson's and were pressing the Union left flank with a massive and rapid assault. Pope's entire army was soon in retreat. Ferrero's brigade was moved by Brig. Gen. Reno to a position on Henry House Hill to cover the Union retreat along the Centreville Turnpike. The brigade, with the 21st in the center, successfully held off Confederate advances from 7 to 9 pm, buying critical time for the Union army. Finally, under the cover of darkness, the brigade quietly retired across Bull Run. During this defeat for the Union army, the 21st suffered light casualties of seven wounded, or two percent.

==== Battle of Chantilly ====
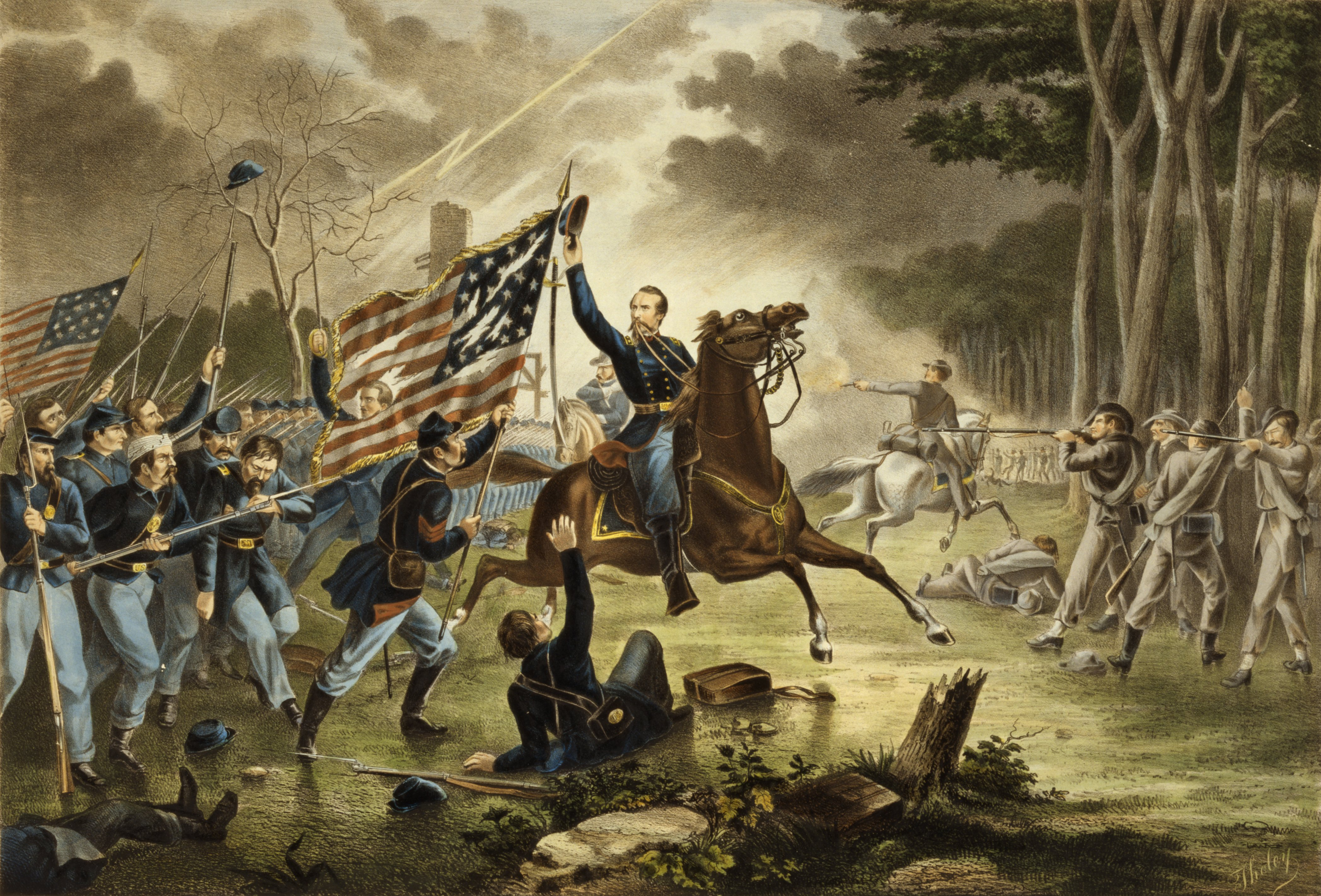
Maj. Gen. Kearny charges to his death at the Battle of Chantilly.

As the Union army retreated towards Washington, it paused to re-group at Centreville, Virginia. On August 31, 1862, Gen. Lee ordered Lt. Gen. Jackson to flank the Union right and to cut the Union army off from Washington. This flanking effort resulted in the Battle of Chantilly which would prove to be the most disastrous engagement of the entire war for the 21st Massachusetts Infantry.

On September 1, the regiment, now numbering 400, marched northwest from Centreville with the rest of Ferrero's brigade. Although the men did not know it, they were among the handful of brigades chosen by Pope to deflect Jackson's flanking movement. Forming battle lines in a field not far from Chantilly Plantation, the 21st watched the 51st New York advance into thick woods to probe the enemy lines. Orders were soon given to Col. Clark to lead the 21st into the woods to support the 51st. The woods were very dense, and the advance was disorderly. Making matters worse, a powerful thunderstorm burst out as the 21st entered the woodland. Unknowingly, the regiment obliqued far to the left and lost contact with the 51st New York. Encountering a body of troops in their front and unable to identify them through the torrential rain, Col. Clark presumed he had found the 51st, ordered the 21st to rest in place and sent officer Lt. Colonel Joseph Parker Rice forward to make contact. The troops were, in fact, men of Jubal Early's brigade and, before this could be ascertained, the Confederates unleashed a devastating volley on the unsuspecting 21st. "In the sudden anguish and despair of the moment," wrote Capt. Walcott, "the whole regiment seemed to be lying bleeding on the ground." Col. Clark immediately ordered a withdrawal and the 21st left more than 100 dead or wounded in the woods.

Reaching the open fields again, the 21st was ordered by Maj. Gen. Philip Kearny to fill a hole in the center of the Union line. As the 21st advanced, Kearny rode out in front of the regiment, strenuously urging them to hurry, and refuting warnings that Confederates were close by. Kearny was killed by a volley from a force of Confederates concealed just inside a nearby tree line. Now in very close range to the enemy, a tense standoff ensued with leveled muskets as the 21st and the Confederate regiment each demanded the surrender of the other. Finally, the Confederate regiment charged on the 21st. It was the first time and last time, according to the regimental historian, that the 21st gave wounds with the bayonet. The hand-to-hand fighting was severe and great confusion resulted. Col. Clark was separated from the unit when most of the men around him were killed and he found himself lost in the Virginia countryside for four days before finding the unit again. This resulted in the mistaken printing of his obituary in Amherst.

Jackson's flanking maneuver was successfully deflected, and the Battle of Chantilly was fought to a stalemate. But the 21st had suffered severely with 35 percent casualties (38 killed, 76 wounded, 26 missing).

=== Maryland Campaign ===
Early in September 1862, the IX Corps, Reno commanding, returned to the Army of the Potomac. Gen. Lee, emboldened by his victories, invaded Maryland and McClellan moved the Army of the Potomac northwest from Washington to meet the Confederates. Portions of the armies clashed during the Battle of South Mountain, during which the 21st played only a small part. Psychologically, however, it was a devastating fight in that it saw the death of Maj. Gen. Reno, who had been the 21st's brigade commander at the start of the war. "There was not a man in the 21st who did not love him," Capt. Walcott of the 21st wrote, "he always stood with his men in battle."

==== Battle of Antietam ====
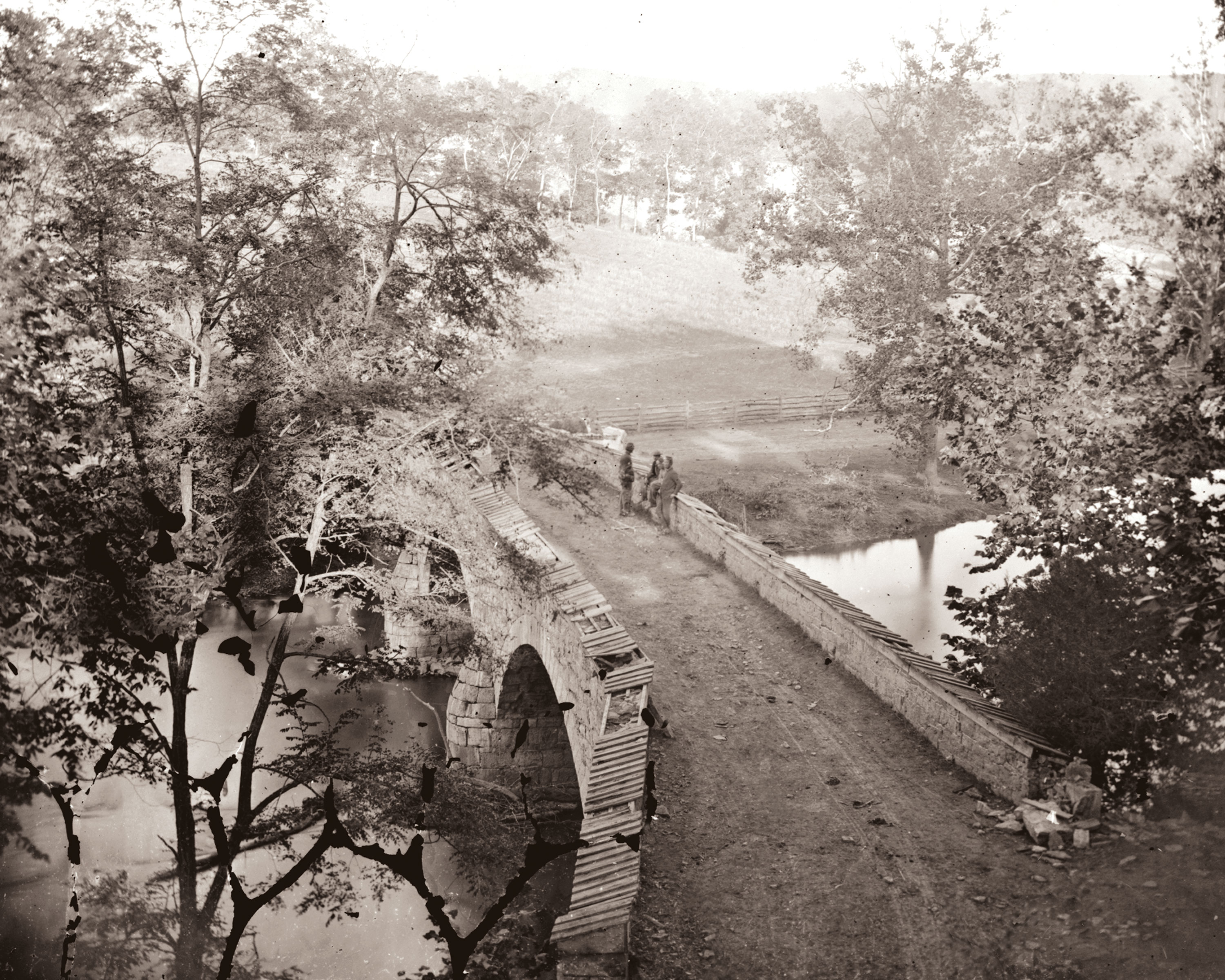
"Burnside's Bridge" over Antietam Creek as seen from the Confederate position after the battle

As McClellan's Army slowly advanced, Lee took up a defensive position in Sharpsburg, Maryland, along Antietam Creek. The 21st, leaving two companies behind at South Mountain for guard detail, now numbered only 150 men. On September 16, the IX Corps took up a position on the left flank of the Union army, near a 125 feet (38 m) stone bridge soon to be known as Burnside's Bridge.

The next day, McClellan began his attack with several advances by the Union right flank, far from the position of the 21st. For much of the day, the IX Corps could hear the fighting and awaited orders to take the bridge in their front. The 21st even was fortunate enough to have a mail call that morning, and the men sat down to read letters from home while fighting raged around the Dunker Church two miles (3 km) away. Finally, orders came at noon and Ferrero's brigade was moved closer to the bridge. It was a difficult target. On the opposite bank, a wooded bluff rose 100 feet (30 m) above the creek. Concealed there was a small force of 400 Confederates who would successfully hold thousands of Union troops at bay for hours. The men of the 21st watched several successive charges on the bridge by brigades of the IX Corps, all of which were repulsed. Finally, Ferrero's brigade was ordered forward. Reaching the bridge at a run, the 21st was ordered to take up a position next to the left abutment, supplying covering fire, while the 51st New York Infantry and the 51st Pennsylvania Infantry finally carried the position. As the Confederates retreated, Ferrero's brigade was soon stationed at the top of the bluff. Later in the afternoon, around sunset, a Confederate counterattack nearly drove the IX Corps back across Antietam Creek. Ferrero's brigade held the bluff, however, playing a key role in checking the counterattack, and taking severe casualties in the process. The 21st listed 10 killed and 35 wounded, casualties of 30 percent.

=== Fredericksburg Campaign ===
On November 7, 1862, Maj. Gen. McClellan was removed from command of the Army of the Potomac and replaced with Maj. Gen. Burnside. Over the course of November, Burnside moved the army south to Falmouth, Virginia, opposite the Rappahannock River from Fredericksburg. The 21st arrived in Falmouth on November 19. Nearly a month passed before Burnside could organize a crossing of the river and an assault on the city and the heights beyond. The Battle of Fredericksburg took place on December 13, 1862.

==== Battle of Fredericksburg ====
The 21st crossed the Rappahannock on December 12 via the pontoon bridges that had been constructed by the Union army and spent the night along the west bank of the river. On the morning of the 13th, the regiment was ordered to the west part of the city, near the base of the heights. Here they removed the grey overcoats that had been issued to them for fear of being mistaken for Confederates. From this position, the 21st watched an assault by a portion of the II Corps over the open plain leading to heights and were shocked by the carnage that resulted from the failed attack. Just after this assault, Ferrero's brigade was ordered to attack the heights and the 21st formed a line of battle on the open ground slightly after noon. The 21st advanced, according to Walcott, "under the best directed artillery fire we had ever suffered or seen." Color bearers were repeatedly shot down. One, Sgt. Thomas Plunkett, was hit by an artillery shell that took off his right arm and left hand. Despite his wounds, he managed to keep the colors from falling. The flag is today in the collection at the Massachusetts State House and still bears the stains from Plunkett's wounds. Plunkett was awarded the Medal of Honor for his bravery at Fredericksburg.

The 21st did not reach the stone wall on Marye's Heights but took shelter in a very slight depression in the terrain, remaining pinned in that position until night. Under the cover of darkness, the regiment retired, only to be ordered to the same spot the next morning, expecting a Confederate counterattack which never came. The regiment lost a third of its numbers at Fredericksburg.

=== Kentucky and Tennessee ===
Following his failure at Fredericksburg, Burnside was reassigned to the Department of the Ohio. The IX Corps, which he had formerly commanded, was reassigned with him. The 21st Massachusetts Infantry boarded trains for Cincinnati on March 28, 1863. They were then transported to Mount Sterling, Kentucky, to combat Confederate guerrillas. In April, due to the reduced numbers of the regiment (now about 200) several officers, being effectively without commands, chose to resign their commissions, including Col. William S. Clark. Command of the regiment passed to Lt. Col. George P. Hawkes.

The regiment saw light duty around Lexington, Kentucky, during the summer of 1863. In September, Burnside launched his effort to capture eastern Tennessee from Confederate hands. The 21st marched for Knoxville, Tennessee, on September 12, 1863. During the Knoxville Campaign, the 21st saw minor action, acting primarily in support of artillery due to their small numbers.

=== Overland campaign and siege of Petersburg ===
After roughly a month's furlough back in Massachusetts during February and March 1864, the 21st returned to the Army of the Potomac as part of a newly reorganized IX Corps, rejoining the army a day before the Battle of the Wilderness on May 4, 1864. Lt. Gen. Ulysses Grant had become general-in-chief of the Union army and intended to follow the Army of the Potomac in the field, relentlessly pushing Lee's Confederate army over the course of the summer of 1864. Walcott of the 21st wrote, "There was to be little of the romance or strategy of war in that horribly bloody work of that summer's campaign in Virginia."

During this campaign, the 21st suffered heavy casualties during the Battle of Spotsylvania and the Battle of Bethesda Church. In the latter engagement, the 21st acted as rear guard and bore the brunt of a fierce attack but held their position. Grant's Overland Campaign concluded with several assaults on Petersburg, Virginia, on June 15–18, 1864. The 21st again took considerable casualties during these attacks, particularly during the assault on June 17. Maj. Henry Richardson, commanding the 21st, was wounded in the thigh during the engagement and was shortly thereafter sent home. Now numbering less than 100 men, the regiment had been reduced to a tenth of its original size. Company A, by this time, had only three men on its active roster.

Following these failed assaults, both armies settled into trench warfare around Petersburg. There were numerous attempts, during the summer of 1864, on the part of the Union army, to dislodge the Confederates from their lines. One of the most disastrous for the Union army was the Battle of the Crater during which explosives were detonated in a large mine tunneled beneath the Confederate entrenchments, temporarily creating a gap in their lines. Elements of the IX Corps, under the command of Maj. Gen. Burnside, were to charge through the gap, but instead became trapped in the enormous crater. Brig. Gen. James Ledlie's division, of which the 21st was a part, led the attack. The division had been selected at the last minute over the United States Colored Troops who had actually trained for the operation. Unprepared, Ledlie's division delayed in their attack, allowing the Confederates time to regroup. The 21st managed to advance, mingled with other regiments, to the furthest point penetrated by Union troops but by the afternoon they made the retreat "pell mell" with the rest of Burnside's IX Corps.

=== Consolidation with the 36th Massachusetts ===
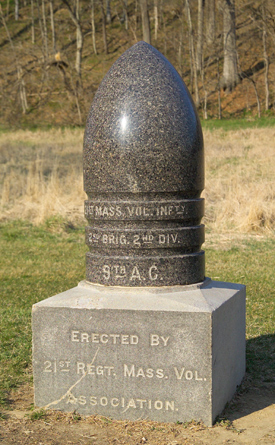
After the war, the veterans of the 21st Massachusetts Infantry chose to place their regimental monument next to Burnside's Bridge on the Antietam Battlefield

On August 18, 1864, the 21st's three-year enlistment came to an end. More than three-quarters of the remaining men chose to re-enlist. These men were consolidated into a battalion of three companies commanded by Capt. Orange S. Sampson. The day after their consolidation, the battalion participated in the Battle of Globe Tavern. The final engagement in which the remaining companies of the 21st participated as an independent unit was the Battle of Poplar Springs Church on September 30, 1864, during which the Union army attempted to extend its lines westward, further encircling Petersburg. Capt. Orange Sampson, commanding the 21st, was killed in this engagement.

On October 21, 1864, the battalion was consolidated with the 36th Massachusetts Volunteer Infantry. When the 36th was mustered out in June 1865, the three companies that had belonged to the 21st were consolidated with the 56th Massachusetts Volunteer Infantry. They were finally mustered out of service on July 8, 1865.

== Affiliations, battle honors, detailed service, and casualties ==
=== Organizational affiliation ===
Attached to:

- Reno's 2nd Brigade, Burnside's Expeditionary Corps, to April, 1862.
- 2nd Brigade, 2nd Division, Department of North Carolina, to July, 1862
- 2nd Brigade, 2nd Division, IX Corps, Army of the Potomac (AoP), to April, 1863
- 2nd Brigade, 2nd Division, IX Corps, Department of the Ohio (DoO), to June, 1863
- 1st Division, XXIII Corps, DoO, to October, 1863.
- 1st Brigade, 2nd Division, IX Corps, DoO, to April, 1864.
- 2nd Brigade, 1st Division, IX Corps, AoP, to June, 1864
- 1st Brigade, 1st Division, IX Corps, AoP, to September, 1864.
- 2nd Brigade, 1st Division, IX Corps, AoP, to October, 1864.

=== List of battles ===
The official list of battles in which the regiment bore a part:

- Battle of Roanoke Island
- Battle of New Berne
- Battle of Camden, South Mills
- Battle of Groveton
- Second Battle of Bull Run
- Battle of Chantilly
- Battle of South Mountain
- Battle of Antietam
- Battle of Fredericksburg
- Siege of Knoxville
- Battle of Campbell's Station
- Battle of the Wilderness
- Battle of Spotsylvania Court House
- Battle of North Anna River
- Battle of Totopotomoy Creek
- Battle of Cold Harbor
- Siege of Petersburg
- First Battle of Deep Bottom
- Battle of the Crater
- Battle of Poplar Springs Church
- Battle of Peebles' Farm

=== Detailed service ===
==== 1861 ====
- Left Massachusetts forBaltimore, Md., August 23-25; thence to Annapolis, MD, August 29
- Duty there until January 6, 1862 until March 12, 1862.

==== 1862 ====
- Burnside's Expedition to Hatteras Inlet, January 6-February 7, 1862.
- Battle of Roanoke Island, February 8.
- At Roanoke Island, NC until March 11.
- Moved to New Berne, NC, March 11-13.
- Battle of New Berne March 14.
- Expedition to Elizabeth City, NC, April 17-19.
- Battle of Camden, South Mills, April 19.
- Duty at New Berne, until July 6.
- Expedition to Pollocksville, NC, to relief of 2nd Maryland, May 17.
- Moved to Newport News, VA, July 6-9; thence to Fredericksburg August 2-4.
- March to relief of Gen. Pope August 12-15.
- Pope's Campaign in Northern Virginia August 16-September 2.
- Battle of Groveton August 29.
- Second Bull Run August 30, and Chantilly September 1.
- Maryland Campaign September-October.
- Battle of South Mountain September 14.
- Battle of Antietam September 16-17.
- At Pleasant Valley, VA, until October 27.
- Movement to Falmouth, VA, October 27-November 17.
- Warrenton, Sulphur Springs, November 15.
- Battle of Fredericksburg December 12-15.

==== 1863 ====
- "Mud March" January 20-24, 1863.
- At Falmouth, Va., until February 19.
- Moved to Newport News, Va., and duty there until March 26.
- Moved to Covington, KY, March 26-April 1.
- At Paris, KY, April 1-5.
- At Mount Sterling, KY until July 6.
- At Camp Nelson, KY, until September 12.
- March to Knoxville, TN, September 12-20.
- Operations in East Tennessee October 22-November 4.
- Knoxville Campaign November 4-December 23.
- Campbell's Station December 16.
- Siege of Knoxville November 17-December 4.
- Pursuit of Longstreet December 5-29.
- Reenlisted December 29.

==== 1864 ====
- Veterans absent on furlough January to March, 1864.
- Moved to Annapolis, MD, and join IX Corps.
- Overland Campaign May-June.
- Battles of the Wilderness May 5-7.
- Spottsylvania May 8-12.
- Ny River May 10. S
- Spotsylvania Court House, May 12-21.
- Assault on the Salient May 12.
- North Anna River May 23-26.
- Ox Ford May 24.
- Line of the Pamunkey May 26-28.
- Totopotomoy May 28-31.
- Cold Harbor June 1-12.
- Bethesda Church June 1-3.
- Before Petersburg June 16-18.
- Siege of Petersburg June 16-October 21.
- Mine Explosion, Petersburg, July 30.
- Non-Veterans left front August 18 and mustered out August 30. 1864.
- Weldon Railroad August 18-21.
- Poplar Springs Church, Peeble's Farm, September 29-October 2.
- Veterans and Recruits transferred to 36th Massachusetts Infantry October 21, 1864.

=== Casualties ===
The regiment lost a total of 250 men during service; 11 officers and 148 enlisted men killed or mortally wounded, 2 Officers and 89 enlisted men died of disease.

== Association with Clara Barton ==
The Civil War nurse Clara Barton was born and raised in Oxford, Worcester County, Massachusetts, and knew many of the men in the 21st Massachusetts Infantry. More than 40 of them had been her students when she was a teacher before the war. She therefore took an acute interest in their welfare. During the Maryland Campaign, she visited frequently with the regiment and cared for its wounded during the Battle of Antietam. Sgt. Plunkett, the color bearer of the 21st who suffered such grievous wounds during the Battle of Fredericksburg, credited Barton with saving his life. She was at his side when he was first treated, personally arranged his transport home, and carried on correspondence with him after the war. Barton declared the 21st her favorite regiment and, in turn, the men of the 21st voted her a "daughter" of the regiment.

== Legacy ==
After the war, Col. William S. Clark became a prominent figure in early American/Japanese relations. After establishing the Massachusetts Agricultural College (now the University of Massachusetts Amherst), Clark was invited by the government of Japan to establish a similar institution, the Sapporo Agricultural College (now the University of Hokkaido). Clark's fame persists in Japan where he is a household name due to the revolutionary western ideas he brought to Hokkaido and the influence he had on the development of the island. His military experience during the Civil War was an important factor in earning the respect of his Japanese superiors.

Today, the history of the 21st Massachusetts Infantry is interpreted by the Southern Piedmont Historical Reenactment Society (SPHRS), a reenacting group based in North Carolina. While dedicated primarily to the history of the 49th North Carolina Infantry, the SPHRS does represent the 21st at living history events and reenactments throughout the year.

== See also ==
- List of Massachusetts Civil War units
- Massachusetts in the Civil War
