= 44th North Carolina Infantry Regiment =

Infantry regiment of the Confederate States Army

- Active: 28 March 1862–9 April 1865
- Country: Confederate States of America
- Allegiance: North Carolina
- Branch: Confederate States Army
- Type: Infantry
- Size: Regiment
- Engagements: Eastern Theatre of the American Civil War: Burnside's North Carolina Expedition; Battle of Tranter's Creek; Bristoe Campaign; Battle of Bristoe Station; Battle of Mine Run; Wilderness Campaign; Battle of the Wilderness; Battle of Spotsylvania Court House; Battle of Cold Harbor; Siege of Petersburg; Battle of Globe Tavern; Second Battle of Ream's Station; Battle of Boydton Plank Road; Battle of Peebles' Farm; Appomattox Campaign

Commanders
- Notable commanders: Charles M. Stedman

The 44th North Carolina Infantry Regiment was a unit of the Confederate States Army during the American Civil War.

Raised in North Carolina during March 1862, it initially served in the eastern part of the state. The regiment moved north and joined the Army of Northern Virginia, guarding rail junctions during the Battle of Gettysburg. For the rest of the war, the regiment served in the North Carolina brigade successively commanded by Pettigrew, Kirkland, and MacRae. It subsequently fought in the Bristoe Campaign, the Wilderness campaign, and the Siege of Petersburg. In the northern hemisphere spring of 1865 it served with the Army of Northern Virginia in the retreat from Richmond and surrendered at the conclusion of the Appomattox Campaign on 9 April.

== History ==
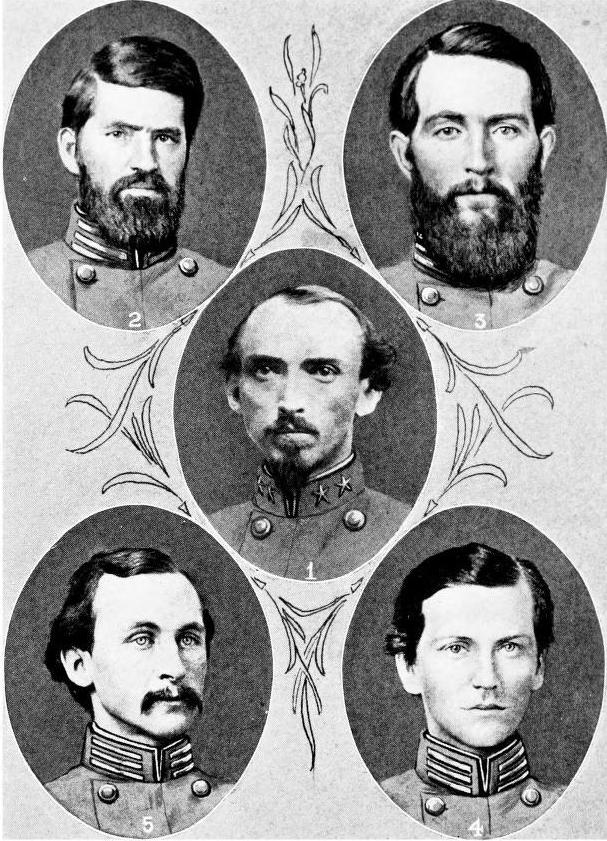
Officers of the 44th North Carolina: Lieutenant Colonel Tazewell F. Hargrove (center), Captains Elkanah E. Lyon of Co A (top left), R.C. Brown of Co B (top right), Robert Bingham of Co G (bottom right), Thomas Hill Norwood of Co H (bottom left)

The 44th North Carolina Infantry was organized on 28 March 1862 at Camp Magnum, near Raleigh, North Carolina, under the command of elected Colonel George B. Singletary. It included ten companies, which enlisted between January and March and were mustered in on 3 April. Company A (Granville Regulators) included men from Granville County, Company B men from Edgecombe County, Companies C and D (Pitt Regulators) men from Pitt County, Company E (Turtle Paws) men from Chatham County, Company F (Trojan Regulators) men from Montgomery County, Company G men from Orange and Alamance Counties, Company H (Montgomery Guards) men from Montgomery County, Company I (Eastern Tigers) men from Pitt and Craven Counties, and Company K (Franklin Guides to Freedom) men from Franklin County. The men of the regiment hailed from the eastern part of North Carolina.

The regiment initially served with the Department of North Carolina, being ordered to Tarboro on 19 May. It then moved to Greenville in eastern North Carolina, participating in outpost and picket duty against Burnside's North Carolina Expedition. On 5 June the regiment fought in the Battle of Tranter's Creek, during which Singletary was killed. His brother, Thomas C. Singletary, was elected Colonel on 28 June.

The regiment was sent north to Virginia, where it joined Pettigrew's Brigade, serving with the Army of Northern Virginia alongside the 11th, 26th, 47th, and 52nd North Carolina Regiments. While the rest of Pettigrew's brigade moved on to Gettysburg, where it fought in Pickett's Charge, the regiment was left behind at Hanover Junction to guard the rail line there, securing the army's communications to Richmond. Singletary guarded the junction with two companies, while Major Charles M. Stedman with four companies was posted north of the junction. The remaining four companies, under the command of Lieutenant Colonel Tazewell L. Hargrove, were each assigned to guard a bridge of the Fredericksburg and Central Railroads across the South Anna and Little Rivers. Hargrove remained with Company A at the Central Railroad bridge over the South Anna, the most threatened by Union attack.

The 44th subsequently served with Kirkland's Brigade and MacRae's Brigade, fighting in the Bristoe Campaign. During the Battle of Bristoe Station, part of the Bristoe Campaign, the regiment reported losses of 23 killed and 63 wounded. It suffered heavy casualties during the Battle of the Wilderness before fighting in the Battle of Spotsylvania Court House and the Battle of Cold Harbor during the Wilderness campaign. From late 1864 to the northern hemisphere spring of 1865, the regiment fought in the Siege of Petersburg south of the James River, in which it again suffered heavy casualties.

In late March 1865, the regiment retreated from Richmond with the rest of the army during the Appomattox Campaign. On 9 April, it surrendered with the rest of the army at Appomattox, mustering only eight officers and 74 men.

Its commanders included Colonels G.B. Singeltary and T.C. Singeltary; Lieutenant Colonels Richard C. Cotton, Elisha Cromwell, and Tazewell L. Hargrove, and Major Charles M. Stedman.

== See also ==
- List of North Carolina Confederate Civil War units
