= Battle of Tranter's Creek =

Battle of the American Civil War

Coordinates: 35.6186°N 77.1431°W

- Part of the American Civil War
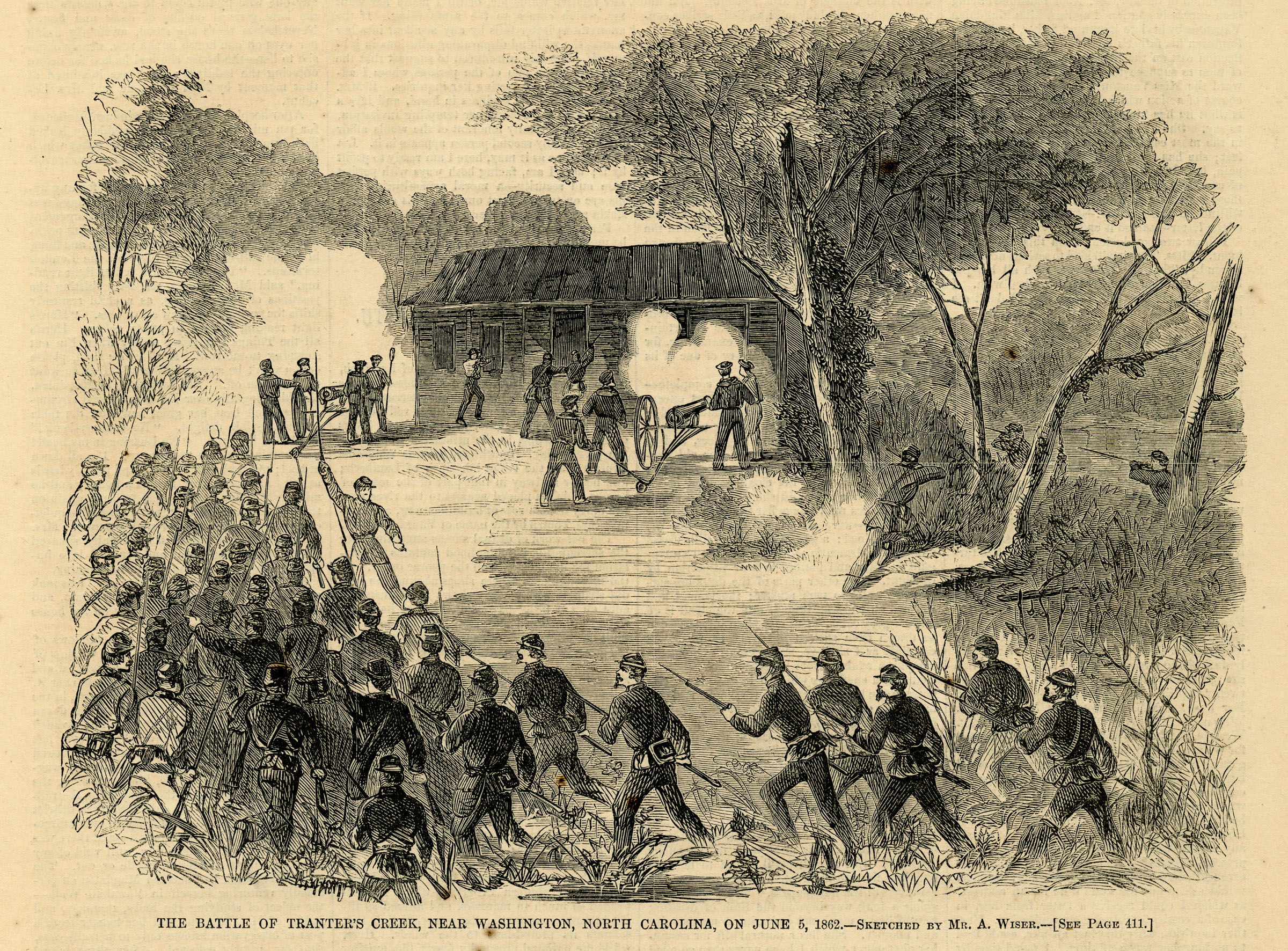
- The Battle of Tranter's Creek, near Washington, North Carolina, June 5 1862 (Harper's Weekly, 1862)
Date	June 5, 1862
Location	Pitt County, North Carolina (due northwest of modern-day Washington, Beaufort County)
Result	Union victory

Belligerents
United States (Union)	(Confederate States of America) CSA (Confederacy)

Commanders and leaders
(United States) Francis A. Osborne	(Confederate States of America) George B. Singletary †

Units involved
24th Massachusetts Infantry; 3rd New York Cavalry	44th North Carolina Infantry

Strength
1 infantry regiment 1 cavalry company 2 artillery pieces	1 infantry regiment

Casualties and losses
- 40

The Battle of Tranter's Creek was fought on June 5, 1862, in Pitt County, North Carolina, as part of Union Maj. Gen. Ambrose E. Burnside's North Carolina expedition during the American Civil War.

On June 5, Col. Robert Potter, garrison commander at Washington, North Carolina, ordered a reconnaissance in the direction of Pactolus. The 24th Massachusetts, under Lt. Col. F. A. Osborne, advanced to the bridge over Tranter's Creek, where it encountered the 44th North Carolina, under Col. George Singletary. Unable to force a crossing, Osborne fired his artillery (Companies A–G, 1st New York Marine Artillery) at the mill buildings in which the Confederates were barricaded. Singletary was killed in the bombardment, and his troops retreated. The Federals did not pursue and returned to their fortifications at Washington.

== Background ==
In March 1862, during Burnside's North Carolina Expedition, the town of Washington, North Carolina was occupied by Union forces. The recently organized 44th North Carolina Infantry Regiment was ordered to move from Camp Mangum to Tarboro, and after Tarboro to Greenville, west of Washington. The Union commanding officer in Washington, Colonel E. E. Potter, received reports in late May that the 44th North Carolina infantry under Colonel George B. Singletary was operating in the vicinity of Pactolus. Fearing that Singletary posed a threat, Potter dispatched the 24th Regiment Massachusetts Volunteer Infantry under Colonel F. A. Osborn to move to Pactolus.

== Battle ==
The 24th Massachusetts Regiment encountered a Confederate force under Singletary at a mill on Tranter's Creek on June 5. The mill complex consisted of three buildings, from one of which the Confederates had removed the floorboards and erected a barricade on the far side of the creek. The Confederates fired upon the Union troops from this vantage, preventing them from crossing the local bridge. In response, Osborn ordered his artillery to shell their position. After Singletary was killed in the bombardment, the Confederates broke and fled. Osborn had his casualties loaded into wagons and then returned with his regiment to Washington.

== Gallery ==
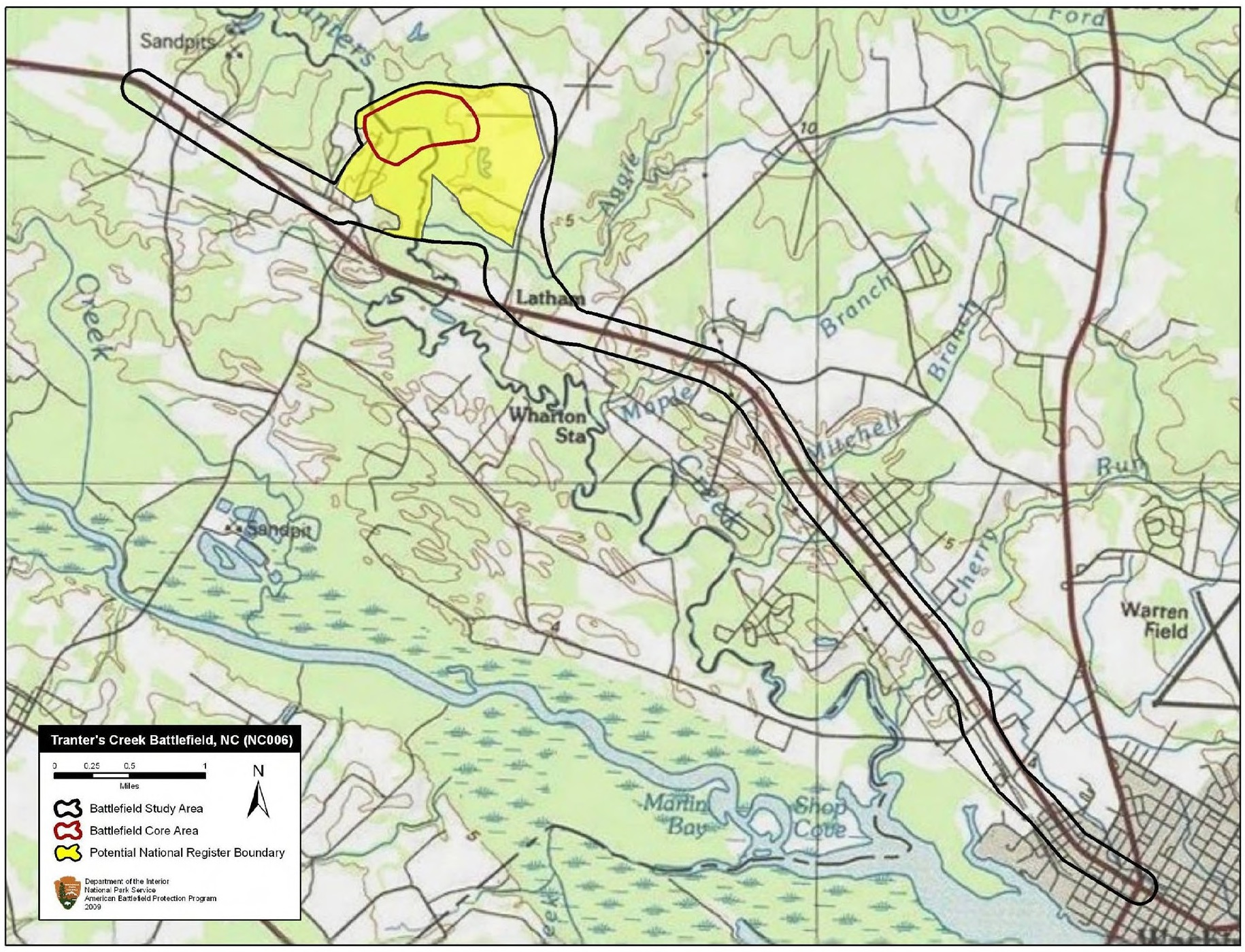
Map of Tranter's Creek Battlefield core and study areas by the American Battlefield Protection Program.

== Works cited ==
- Barrett, John G. (1963). The Civil War in North Carolina. Chapel Hill: The University of North Carolina Press. ISBN 0-8078-0874-1.
