= Joseph Parker Rice =

American military officer

Lt. Col. Joseph Parker Rice
- Born: March 1821; Ashburnham, Massachusetts
- Died: September 1, 1862 (aged 41); Chantilly, Virginia
- Cause of death: Killed in action at the Battle of Chantilly
- Occupations: Military officer, artisan, state legislator
- Known for: Second-in-command of the 21st Massachusetts Infantry Regiment
- Spouse: Emma M. Garnett

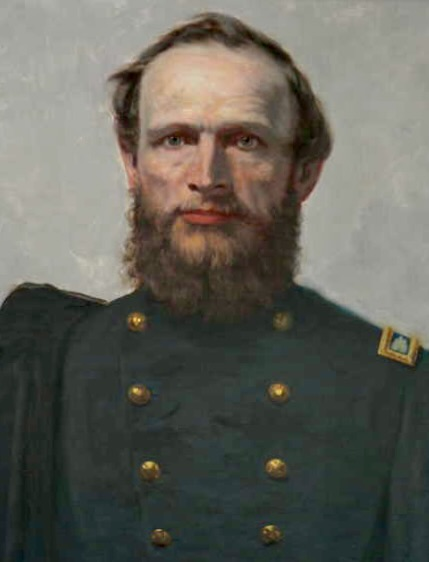
Lt. Col. Joseph Parker Rice, Ashburnham MA. 1821-1862. Original painting once hung in the "Old State House in Boston".

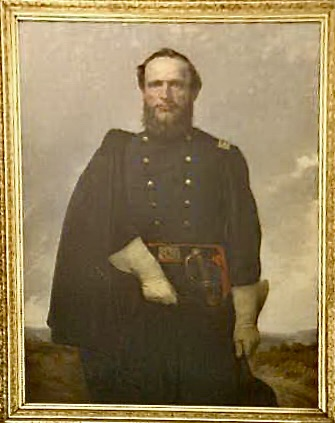
Lt. Col. Joseph Parker Rice, Civil War Hero. Ashburnham, MA

Lt. Col. Joseph Parker Rice (1821 – September 1, 1862) was an American military officer, state legislator, community leader, and artisan who served in the Union Army during the American Civil War. Born into a foundational family of wood craftsmen in Ashburnham, Massachusetts, he rose to become the Lieutenant Colonel and second-in-command of the 21st Massachusetts Infantry Regiment. He was killed in action at the Battle of Chantilly and was subsequently honored with one of the largest public military funerals in the region's wartime history.

== Military Service ==
Prior to the outbreak of the Civil War, Rice was heavily active in the local Massachusetts militia system, notably serving as a colonel of the 9th Massachusetts Volunteer Militia (MVM) before the war. He later commanded the Ashburnham Light Infantry, earning a reputation as a stern, highly disciplined drillmaster of "iron will.

At the outbreak of the war in April 1861, Rice rallied his local militia company to volunteer for federal service, enlisting roughly 80 men from the town. In August 1861, the unit was officially mustered into federal service as Company G of the 21st Massachusetts Infantry Regiment, where he initially served as a Captain. His tactical competence and organizational leadership led to rapid promotions: first to Major in February 1862, and later to Lieutenant Colonel on May 16, 1862, serving as second-in-command under Colonel William S. Clark.

The 21st Massachusetts saw heavy action during Major General Ambrose Burnside's North Carolina Expedition, fighting at Roanoke Island and the Battle of Newbern before transferring to Northern Virginia. In recognition of his leadership, valor, and promotions, Rice was honored by his regiment with the presentation of a magnificent ceremonial gold-accented presentation sword prior to his final campaign.

=== Death at Chantilly ===
On September 1, 1862, during the Battle of Chantilly, the 21st Massachusetts fought to check a flanking advance by Confederate forces under Major General "Stonewall" Jackson. In the midst of a violent, blinding summer thunderstorm at dusk, the regiment became separated in dense woods.

Encountering an unidentified body of troops in the torrential rain, Lt. Col. Rice advanced alone into a clearing to ascertain their identity and prevent a friendly-fire incident. The hidden force was Brigadier General Jubal Early's Confederate brigade, which opened fire. Rice was killed instantly at the head of his regiment.

== Family Legacy and Early Career ==
Rice was born in March 1821 to Joseph Rice and Susan (Balcom) Rice. He belonged to a multi-generational lineage of prominent Massachusetts woodworkers and mechanics who were central to the development of Ashburnham's early chair-manufacturing economy.

His grandfather, Reuben Rice, was an early settler and pioneering craftsman who helped establish the town's local wood trade, transitioning the rugged wilderness into a manufacturing hub. His father, Joseph Rice, continued this tradition as a skilled mechanic and wood artisan, passing the trade down to his sons. Joseph Parker Rice mastered these generational wood-turning and mechanical skills, working as an esteemed local artisan and mechanic prior to the war.

Beyond his trade, Rice was an honored citizen of Ashburnham who actively engaged in civil governance, representing the town in the Massachusetts State Legislature.

His brother, Oran Sebastian Rice, diverged into horology, learning the trade of watchmaking specifically to complement the work of his uncle, Reuben Rice Conn (father of the noted biologist Herbert William Conn). In the 1850s, Reuben Rice Conn had established a pioneering jewelry studio in nearby Fitchburg, Massachusetts. By uniting their skills, this family network laid the groundwork for a generational commercial dynasty.

Rice married Emma M. Garnett, daughter of the Southern-born Master Mariner Capt. John G. Garnett and Mary Ann Barnett.

=== Children and Business Legacy ===
The couple's children went on to solidify a significant historical footprint within the Worcester County business landscape:

- Frederick William Rice: Trained deeply in the generational watchmaking and jewelry-crafting arts under the direct tutelage of his uncle Oran. He went on to formally establish F.W. Rice Jewelers, a landmark storefront operating on Main Street in Fitchburg. Tracing its lineage straight back to Reuben Rice Conn's original 1850s studio, the business line adapted over generations and finally closed its doors in the year 2000 as Hyland Rice Office Products. At the time of its closing, it was run by Reuben's 4x great-grandson, James Parker Rice, Jr. (son of the prominent modern dancer Marion Rice and brother of the noted dancer Carolyn Brown). Spanning 150 continuous years, it is recognized as a historic family-run venture in the history of Fitchburg and its surrounding communities.
- Joseph Newbern Rice (1862–1939): Born on March 14, 1862, his name was directly inspired by contemporary Civil War events. He was named in honor of the Battle of New Bern, a major Union victory that his father, Col. Joseph Parker Rice, was actively fighting in on the literal day of his son's birth.

== Funeral, Burial, and Legacy ==
The return of Lt. Col. Rice to his beloved Ashburnham prompted a massive public outpouring of grief. Decades after his sacrifice, a retrospective in The Boston Globe published on May 31, 1909, memorialized his reputation, noting that he was popular, deeply mourned, and described him as:

"...a soldier in the best sense of the term: to bravery and courage he united manliness of character and genuine kindness of heart."

Accountings detailed a magnificent public funeral following the war that drew thousands of mourners from across the region. His casket traveled in a solemn, grand procession by horse-drawn hearse, making its way through the communities of Worcester County. Escorted by a massive military and civic guard, the procession moved along regional roads lined with grieving citizens before arriving in Ashburnham. He was interred with full military honors at the New Cemetery in Ashburnham.

=== Honors ===
- GAR Post 69: In May 1867, the Grand Army of the Republic Post serving Westminster and Ashburnham was officially chartered as the Col. J. P. Rice Post in his memory.
- Memorial Portrait: Around 1880, a formal memorial portrait was commissioned from a wartime photograph. It initially hung in the Old State House in Boston before being permanently relocated to the Westminster/Ashburnham Public Library.
- Civil War Monument: Rice's sacrifice is a centerpiece of the Ashburnham Civil War Monument, dedicated in 1905, which features the celebrated sculpture The Volunteer by Theo Alice Ruggles Kitson.

== See also ==
- 21st Massachusetts Infantry Regiment
- Battle of Chantilly
- Battle of New Bern
