= George P. Hawkes =

Union colonel during the American Civil War (1824–1903)

- Born: March 7, 1824; Templeton, Massachusetts
- Died: September 21, 1903 (aged 79); Templeton, Massachusetts
- Burial place: Pine Grove Cemetery, Templeton, Massachusetts
- Military career
- Allegiance: (United States) Union
- Branch: Union Army
- Service years: 1861–1864
- Rank: Colonel; Brevet Brigadier General
- Commands: 21st Regiment Massachusetts Volunteer Infantry
- Conflicts: American Civil War

George Perkins Hawkes (March 7, 1824 – September 21, 1903) was a colonel in the Union Army during the American Civil War. He commanded the 21st Regiment Massachusetts Volunteer Infantry from April 1863 to July 1864. In March 1867, he was awarded the honorary grade of brevet brigadier general, United States Volunteers, to rank from March 13, 1865, seven months after his resignation of his commission in the army (due to poor health).

== Civil War ==
Shortly after the beginning of the Civil War, Hawkes was commissioned captain of Company A of the 21st Massachusetts on August 21, 1861. He was promoted to major on September 2, 1862, and to lieutenant colonel on December 18, 1862. From July 1862 to March 1863, the 21st Massachusetts was attached to the Army of the Potomac and participated in several of the largest battles of the Civil War, including the Second Battle of Bull Run, the Battle of Antietam and the Battle of Fredericksburg. Lt. Col. Hawkes took command of the 21st Massachusetts after the resignation of Col. William Smith Clark in April 1863. By this time, the 21st Massachusetts had been transferred to eastern Kentucky as part of the Army of the Ohio and was primarily engaged in fighting guerrillas. In the fall of 1863, Maj. Gen. Ambrose Burnside moved the Army of the Ohio into eastern Tennessee and took the city of Knoxville. Confederate forces under the command of Lt. Gen. James Longstreet attempted to drive the Union army out of eastern Tennessee during the siege of Knoxville. Lt. Col. Hawkes was placed in the role of an acting brigade commander during this campaign and led two regiments. When the 21st was transferred back to the Army of the Potomac in May 1864, Hawkes led the regiment during the Battle of the Wilderness, the Battle of Spotsylvania and the Battle of Bethesda Church. Poor health forced him to resign from the army on July 3, 1864. Hawkes was nominated by President Andrew Johnson on March 26, 1867 for the award of the honorary grade of brevet brigadier general, U.S. Volunteers, to rank from March 13, 1865, for faithful and meritorious services. The U.S. Senate confirmed the award on March 30, 1867.

== See also ==
- List of Massachusetts generals in the American Civil War
- Massachusetts in the American Civil War
