= Ambrose R. Wright =

American Confederate Army General

Ambrose Wright
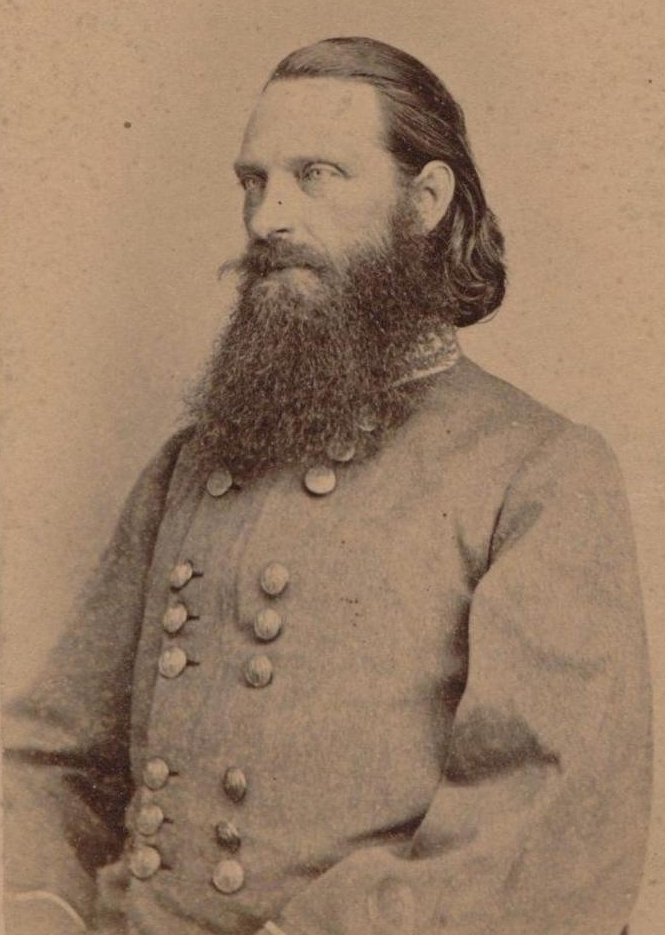

Member-elect of the U.S. House of Representatives from Georgia's 8th district
- Died before taking office
- Preceded by: Constituency reestablished
- Succeeded by: Alexander H. Stephens

Personal details
- Born: Ambrose Ransom Wright; April 26, 1826 Louisville, Georgia, U.S.
- Died: December 21, 1872 (aged 46) Augusta, Georgia, U.S.
- Party: Democratic
- Nickname: "Rans"

Military service
- Allegiance: Confederate States
- Branch/service: Confederate States Army
- Years of service: 1861–1865
- Rank: Brigadier General
- Battles/wars: American Civil War

Ambrose Ransom "Rans" Wright (April 26, 1826 – December 21, 1872) was an American lawyer, politician, and Confederate general in the American Civil War.

== Early life ==
Wright, known by the nickname "Rans", was born in Louisville, Georgia. He read law under the tutelage of Governor and Senator Herschel V. Johnson, who later became his brother-in-law, and was admitted to the bar. He became prominent politically, although he ran unsuccessfully for the Georgia legislature and for the United States Congress. He was a presidential elector for Millard Fillmore in 1856, a supporter of Bell and Everett in 1860, and a Georgia commissioner to Maryland in 1861.

== Civil War ==
At the start of the Civil War, Wright enlisted as a private in Georgia Militia, but he was commissioned colonel of the 3rd Georgia Infantry on May 18, 1861, and served in North Carolina and Georgia until the summer of 1862 and won a victory for the Confederacy at the Battle of South Mills in North Carolina in April 1862. In May, Wright traveled with his regiment to Virginia and fought in the Battle of Seven Pines as part of Brig. Gen Albert G. Blanchard's brigade. Blanchard was removed from command afterwards due to poor performance and Wright replaced him, being promoted to brigadier general.

Wright's Georgians made a distinguished record in the Army of Northern Virginia from the Seven Days Battles to the Siege of Petersburg. He was badly wounded at the Battle of Antietam in 1862 and at Chancellorsville in 1863.

At the Battle of Gettysburg, Wright's brigade, part of Maj. Gen. Richard H. Anderson's division of Lt. Gen. A.P. Hill's Corps, breached the Union defenses on Cemetery Ridge on July 2, 1863. His command drove off the Union force and captured twenty artillery pieces, before being forced to retire through lack of support.

Wright continued to lead his brigade as part of Anderson's division in A.P. Hill's Third Corps in subsequent the Bristoe and Mine Run Campaigns of 1863, as well as the Overland Campaign of 1864.

As of November 26, 1864, Wright was named major general on a temporary commission (which was not made permanent) and ordered to Georgia, where he exercised command until the end of the war.

== Postbellum career ==
In 1863, Wright had been elected to the Georgia State Senate and president of that body in absentia. Resuming his law practice after the termination of hostilities, he purchased the Augusta Chronicle & Sentinel newspaper in 1866, and, in 1871, was defeated for the Democratic nomination for the United States Senate. The following year, General Wright was a delegate to both the state and national Democratic conventions and was elected to the United States House of Representatives, but died at Augusta, Georgia, before taking his seat. At a special election to fill the vacancy, Alexander Stephens was elected his successor. General Wright is buried in Magnolia Cemetery (formerly City Cemetery), Augusta.

His grandson was U.S. Senator John S. Cohen.

== See also ==
- List of American Civil War generals (Confederate)
- List of United States representatives-elect who never took their seats

U.S. House of Representatives
Constituency reestablished	Member-elect of the U.S. House of Representatives from Georgia's 8th congressional district 1872	Succeeded by Alexander H. Stephens
