= Thomas G. Stevenson =

Thomas Greely Stevenson
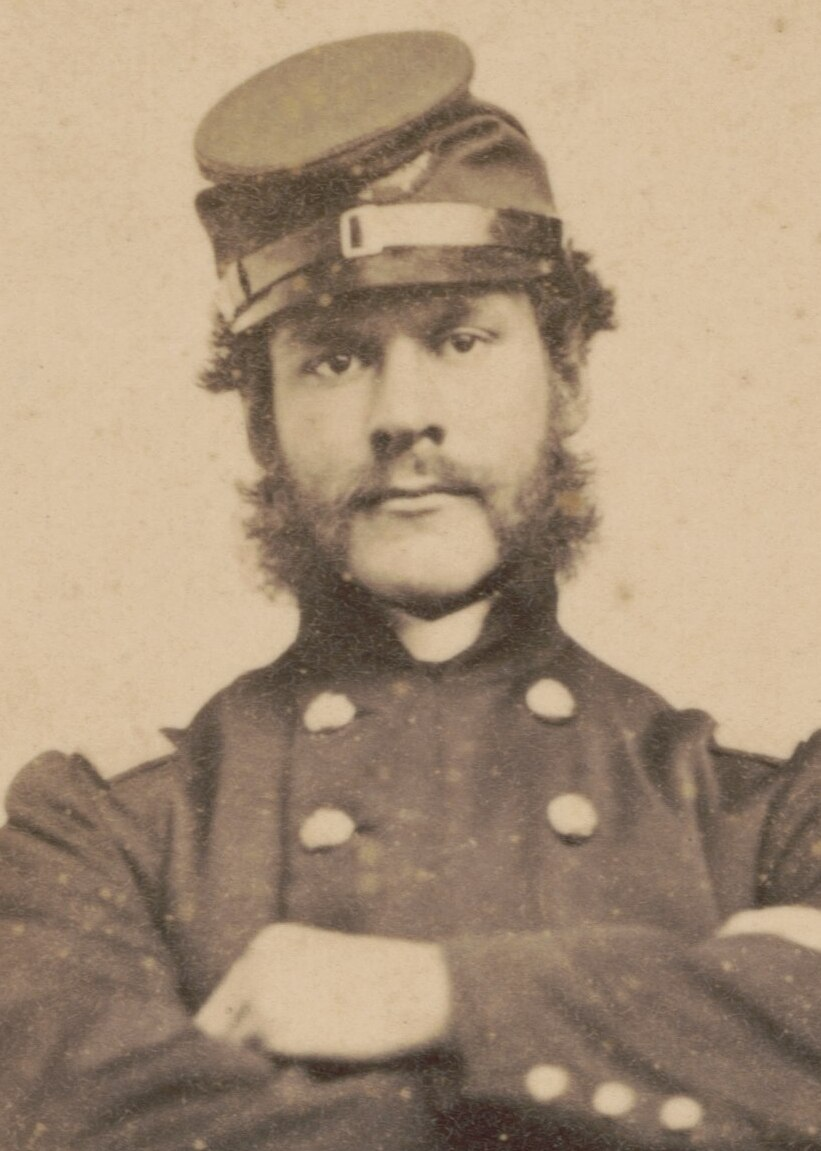
- Born: February 3, 1836; Boston, Massachusetts
- Died: May 10, 1864 (aged 28); Spotsylvania County, Virginia
- Burial place: Mount Auburn Cemetery, Cambridge, Massachusetts
- Military career
- Allegiance: United States of America; Union
- Branch: United States Army; Union Army
- Service years: 1861–1864
- Rank: Brigadier General
- Commands: 24th Massachusetts Volunteer Infantry Regiment
- Conflicts: American Civil War: Battle of Roanoke Island; Battle of New Bern; Siege of Charleston Harbor; Battle of the Wilderness; Battle of Spotsylvania †

Thomas Greely Stevenson (February 3, 1836 – May 10, 1864) was a general in the Union Army during the American Civil War. He was killed in action during the Battle of Spotsylvania Courthouse.

== Biography ==
Stevenson was born in Boston, Massachusetts. He was 25 years old when the Civil War began and had risen from private to major in the Massachusetts Militia at that time. On December 3, 1861 Stevenson was appointed colonel of the 24th Massachusetts Volunteer Infantry. He led his regiment in the battles of Roanoke Island and New Bern. Following the capture of New Bern significant Union reinforcements arrived in North Carolina and Stevenson assumed command of a brigade under John G. Foster.

When much of the Union forces in North Carolina were recalled to Virginia, Foster's command, including Stevenson's brigade, were left behind. He participated in Foster's Goldsborough Expedition and afterward was promoted to brigadier general on December 24, 1862. He then held a series of quiet commands along the Atlantic coast in North and South Carolina.

During the siege of Charleston Harbor Stevenson commanded the 3rd Brigade in Alfred H. Terry's division. He remained in brigade command around Charleston until January 1864. On April 19, 1864 he was placed in command of the 1st Division, IX Corps. Stevenson had previously fought alongside many of the men from IX Corps in North Carolina. Now, he was one of Burnside's ablest division commanders. He led his new division into action at the battles of the Wilderness and Spotsylvania. On May 10, 1864 while resting beneath a tree, Stevenson was shot through the head by a sniper's bullet. His body was returned to Massachusetts where he was buried at Mount Auburn Cemetery in Cambridge.

Fort Stevenson in North Dakota was named in Thomas Stevenson's honor. His brother, Robert Hooper Stevenson, was a colonel and brevet brigadier general in the Union Army. Battery Stevenson, located on Fort Warren, George's Island, Suffolk County, Massachusetts was named after General Stevenson on 14 February 1902.
