= Battle of South Mills =

Battle of the American Civil War

Coordinates: 36.4304°N 76.3033°W

- Part of the American Civil War
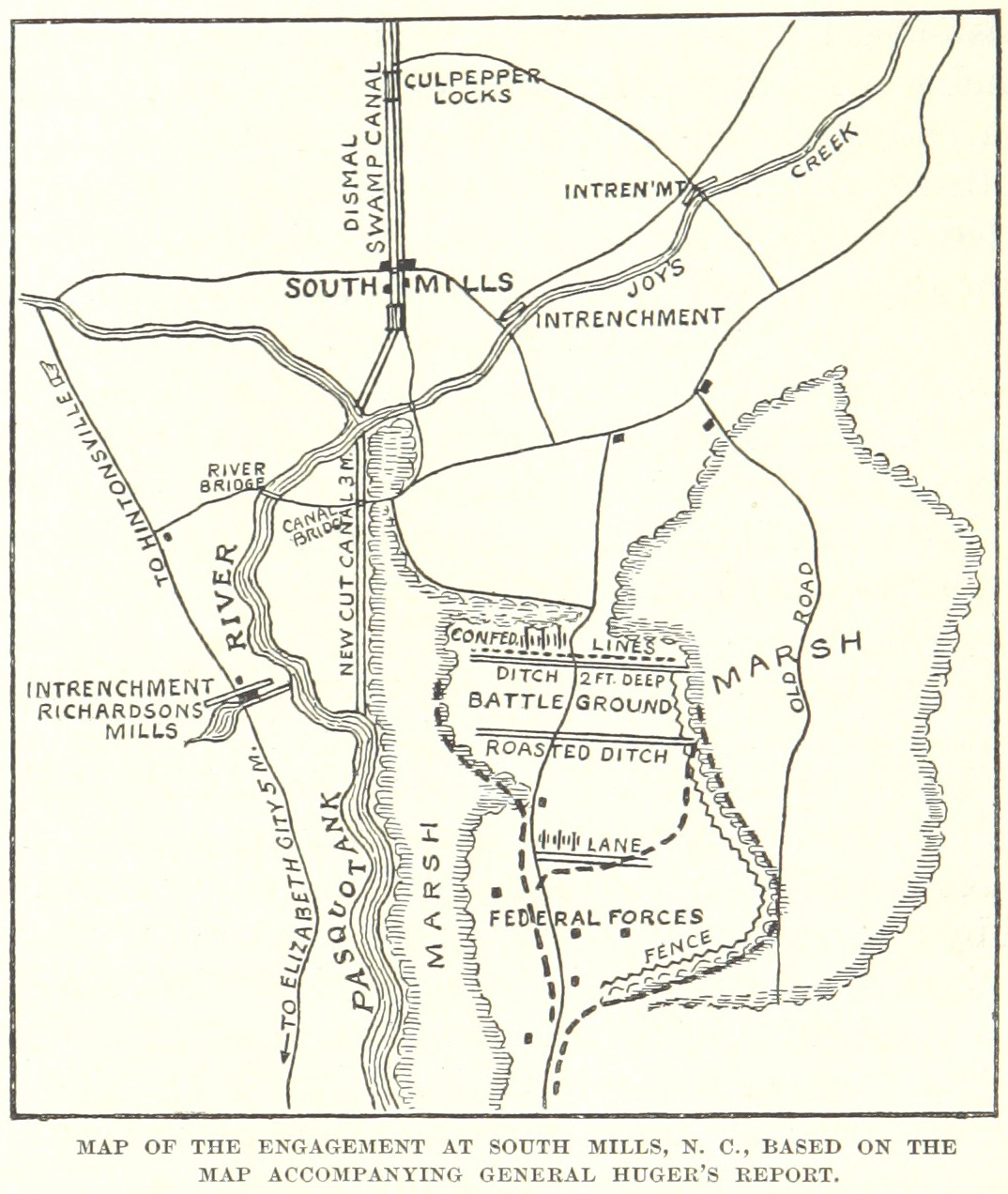
- A map of the battle
Date	April 19, 1862
Location	Camden County, North Carolina
Result	Inconclusive

Belligerents
United States (Union)	(Confederate States of America) CSA (Confederacy)

Commanders and leaders
Jesse L. Reno	Ambrose R. Wright

Units involved
Department of North Carolina	3rd Georgia Infantry; Ferebee's North Carolina Militia; McComa's Battery; Gillett's Southampton Cavalry Co.

Strength
3,000+	~900

Casualties and losses
13 killed 101 wounded 13 missing	6 killed 19 wounded 3 captured

The Battle of South Mills, also known as the Battle of Camden, took place on April 19, 1862 in Camden County, North Carolina as part of Union Army Maj. Gen. Ambrose E. Burnside's North Carolina expedition during the American Civil War.

Learning that the Confederates were building ironclads at Norfolk, Burnside planned an expedition to destroy the Dismal Swamp Canal locks to prevent transfer of the ships to Albemarle Sound. He entrusted the operation to Brig. Gen. Jesse L. Reno's command, which embarked on transports from Roanoke Island on April 18. By midnight, the convoy reached Elizabeth City and began disembarking troops.

On the morning of April 19, Reno marched north on the road to South Mills. At the crossroads a few miles below South Mills, elements of Col. Ambrose R. Wright's command delayed the Federals until dark. Reno abandoned the expedition and withdrew during the night to the transports at Elizabeth City. The transports carried Reno's troops to New Bern where they arrived on April 22. Union forces later pushed Confederate units out of the coastal areas, which they occupied for the duration of the war.

== Background ==
Burnside received reports that the Confederacy was constructing ironclad warships in Norfolk and was planning to deploy them in the Albemarle Sound via the Dismal Swamp Canal and the Albemarle and Chesapeake Canal. To thwart such moves, Burnside ordered Reno to take his forces to South Mills and destroy the locks on the Dismal Swamp Canal there and then continue to the mouth of the Albemarle and Chesapeake Canal and "blow in its banks". (Note: The locks on the Dismal Swamp Canal at South Mills were known as the Culpepper Locks. Burnside referred to the "Currituck Canal" in his documents but historian John G. Barrett surmised that he meant the Albemarle and Chesapeake Canal, which emptied into the Currituck Sound.)

Reno led the 21st Massachusetts Infantry Regiment and the 51st Massachusetts Infantry Regiment out of New Bern towards South Mills. He was joined by three regiments under Colonel Rush C. Hawkins dispatched from Roanoke Island: the 9th New York Infantry Regiment, the 89th New York Infantry Regiment, and the 6th New Hampshire Infantry Regiment. With the addition of a four cannon artillery battery supervised by Colonel W. A. Howard, the total federal force totaled over 3,000 troops. To demolish the locks, the federals brought three wagons filled with 4,000 pounds of gunpowder.

The federal expedition arrived by ship at Chantilly, four miles south of Elizabeth City, on the night of April 18. Reno's transports ran aground, delaying the disembarkation of his troops. Anxious to proceed with the operation, at about 3:00 on April 19 he ordered Hawkins to take his forces north and hold the locks until the rest of the federal force could catch up. Hawkins had a local mulatto man serve as his guide. The guide led them down a less direct route and into a Confederate cavalry picket. During the brief skirmish between the 9th New York Infantry's vanguard and the horsemen, the guide attempted to escape into the woods. Hawkins ordered him detained and shot for his apparent treachery. Because of their misdirection, instead of marching an anticipated 10 miles, Hawkins' federals marched 22 miles. The delay meant his force only linked up with Reno's contingent several miles away from South Mills.

A Confederate force of less than 900 men under Colonel Ambrose R. Wright established positions south of South Mills to defend the town. To cover the road the federals were travelling upon, known to locals as Sawyer's Lane, (Note: Officially, this thoroughfare was called the Camden Court House Road.) Wright stationed six companies of his Third Georgia Regiment and a handful of men from Colonel D. D. Ferrebee's First Brigade of North Carolina Militia along a drainage ditch which bisected the route at the north end of a mile-wide open field three miles below South Mills. They fortified the ditch with makeshift breastworks using wood from a nearby fence and were bolstered by a four-gun artillery battery led by Captain W. W. McComas. (Note: Writer William R. Trotter's description of the Confederate defense is slightly different. He wrote that Wright only had five companies—about 400 men—stationed along the ditch. Furthermore, he held that McComas had three guns in his battery, of which only two were stationed at the road.) To prevent the federals from using a similar ditch on the other side of the field, the Confederates filled it with fence rails and set it ablaze. (Note: Official Confederate and Union reports of the battle both refer to this as "the roasted ditch".) Two companies of the Third Georgia Regiment were placed on a road running along the west bank of the Pasquotank River to cover the Confederates' right flank, and two more companies as well as the bulk of the militia brigade were held in reserve.

== Battle ==
The fighting began at around noon on April 19 when McComas' artillery began shelling the advancing 51st Pennsylvania Infantry Regiment. The Pennsylvanians sought cover in the woods and halted their advance, too exhausted from the day's marching to continue. Tree cover and smoke from the burning ditch obscured the federals' view of the Confederates. Reno brought the rest of his force up to engage the Confederate line and ordered his artillery, four guns total, to be brought to bear. At about 15:00, Hawkins unilaterally ordered his 9th New York Infantry to charge the Confederate artillery battery. The regiment's charge was swiftly dissipated under heavy Confederate fire, and within a few minutes the unit had suffered nine soldiers killed and 58 wounded, including Hawkins, who sustained a bullet wound to an arm.

Both sides continued to exchange fire from steady lines for another hour until a Minie ball struck and killed McComas. Frightened by the death of their commander, the remainder of the Confederate artillerymen fled. Reno then ordered his force to charge the Confederate lines. The Confederates rebuffed the assault but Wright, fearing that he might be outflanked, ordered his forces to withdraw two miles north to prepared works at Joy's Creek. The federals did not pursue, with Reno later reporting that his troops were too exhausted to engage in a chase.

== Aftermath ==
Total casualties from the battle amounted to six Confederates killed and 19 wounded while the Union troops suffered 13 killed and 101 wounded. Three Confederates were captured and 13 federals were reported missing. The federal force made camp on the battlefield for the night. Reno, having heard a rumor of Confederate reinforcements being dispatched from Norfolk and fearing a nighttime ambush, ordered his troops roused at about 21:00 and marched them back to Elizabeth City. He was also mindful of orders from Burnside to not spend excessive time on his expedition. A chaplain and assistant surgeon were left behind to tend to the wounded and bury the dead. Reno's force returned to New Bern on April 22. Reno's fear was not borne out; no reinforcements were sent to the Confederates, and Wright, feeling that he could be outflanked at Joy's Creek, withdrew his men another 12 miles north.

In his official report on the fighting, Reno claimed he had achieved victory by successfully feinting towards Norfolk. Burnside supported his assessment and endorsed his decision to not pursue the Confederates. Hawkins filed his own report on Reno's expedition, deeming it a fiasco and noting the failure to sabotage the canal locks. For his part, Reno denounced Hawkins as a "rascal" and considered his untimely charge a blunder which had cost the federals their initiative. The Civil War Sites Advisory Commission of the United States deemed the result of the battle "inconclusive". Historian John G. Barrett considered it a Confederate victory, noting that the federals had withdrawn without achieving their objective of destroying the locks. Writer William R. Trotter agreed with this assessment, additionally noting that while Wright had withdrawn the Confederates from the battlefield, the Union force had sustained disproportionate casualties. Conversely, historian Earl J. Hess considered Wright's withdrawal under threat of being flanked as indicative of a Confederate defeat.

No Confederate ironclads were ever sent along the Dismal Swamp Canal during the course of the war, with such vessels in service being too large to make the passage. The engagement is known variously as the Battle of South Mills, the Battle of Sawyer's Lane, and the Battle of Camden. J. C. Julius Langbein, a drummer boy in the 9th New York Infantry, was later awarded the Congressional Medal of Honor for coming to the aide of a fallen lieutenant during the battle. In 1936, a North Carolina Highway Historical Marker was erected southeast of South Mills to commemorate the event.

== Works cited ==
- Barrett, John G. (1963). The Civil War in North Carolina. Chapel Hill: The University of North Carolina Press. ISBN 0-8078-0874-1.
- Civil War Sites Advisory Commission Report on the Nation's Civil War Battlefields Technical Volume II: Battle Summaries (PDF), United States National Park Service, 1993
- Hess, Earl J. (2006). Field Armies and Fortifications in The Civil War: The Eastern Campaigns, 1861-1864. Chapel Hill: The University of North Carolina Press. ISBN 9780807876398.
- Mallison, Fred M. (2024). The Civil War on the Outer Banks : A History of the Late Rebellion Along the Coast of North Carolina from Carteret to Currituck, with Comments on Prewar Conditions and an Account of Postwar Recovery. Jefferson: McFarland. ISBN 9781476621593.
- Trotter, William R. (1989). Ironclads and Columbiads: the Civil War in North Carolina: The Coast. Winston-Salem: John F. Blair. ISBN 0-89587-088-6.
