= Sapporo Independent Christian Church =

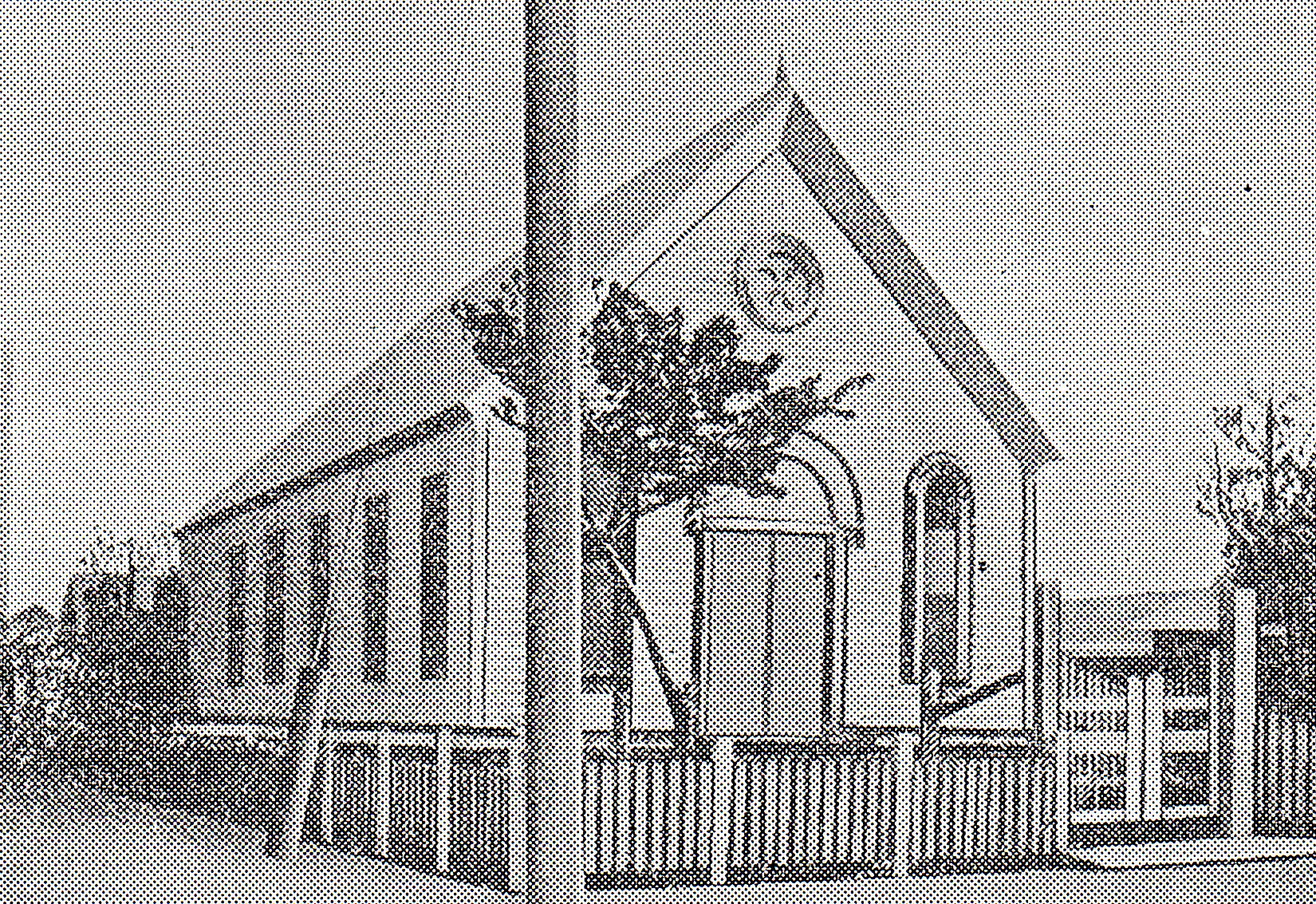
- Sapporo Independent Christian Church in July 1885.

- Location of the church in Japan.
- 43°3′23.8″N 141°19′25.7″E
- Location: Sapporo
- Country: Japan
- Denomination: Independent
- Website: www12.plala.or.jp/dokuritsu-kyokai/index.html

History
- Founded: October 2, 1881
- Founder: Uchimura Kanzō

The Sapporo Independent Christian Church (Japanese: 札幌独立キリスト教会, Hepburn: Sapporo Dokuritsu Kirisuto Kyōkai; or Sapporo Christian Church) is a church located in Sapporo, Japan. It was founded in 1881 by students of William S. Clark at the Sapporo Agricultural College. These students became known as the "Sapporo band" of Christians. Although Clark had returned to the United States by the time the church was founded, he supported it financially and corresponded with its members through letters. Members of the church include Uchimura Kanzō, who went on to found the non-church movement, and Nitobe Inazō, who became president of the Tokyo Women's Christian College, an under-secretary at the League of Nations, and was the author of Bushido: The Soul of Japan.
