= Jūkichi Yagi =

Japanese poet (1898–1927)

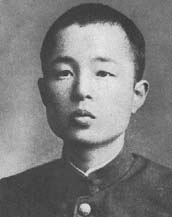
- Jūkichi Yagi
- Born: 八木 重吉; 9 February 1898; Machida, Tokyo, Japan
- Died: 26 October 1927 (aged 29); Chigasaki, Kanagawa, Japan
- Resting place: Yagi family cemetery, Machida, Tokyo
- Occupation: schoolteacher
- Writing career
- Genre: religious poetry

Jūkichi Yagi (八木 重吉, Yagi Jūkichi; 9 February 1898 – 26 October 1927) was a Japanese poet active in the late Taishō period and for the first few years of the Shōwa period, who focused on modern religious themes.

== Biography ==
Born in what is now part of the city of Machida near Tokyo, Yagi attended the Kanagawa Prefectural Normal School, then located in Kamakura, Kanagawa prefecture. There he converted to Methodism and became attracted to the poetry of Rabindranath Tagore. In 1919, Yagi was baptized at the Komagome Christian Church in Tokyo. He remained a devout Protestant all his short life, but later moved to the Non-Church Christianity (Mukyōkai) as advocated by Uchimura Kanzō.

After graduation, Yagi taught at the Mikage Normal School in Hyōgo Prefecture, and began to write verse as an expression of his faith. He was very much inspired by the poems of John Keats, to whom he dedicated a number of his poems. Yagi published his first collection, Aki no Hitome (Autumn Eye) in 1925. Although he contributed several pieces to poetry magazines, he remained shy of literary circles.

Hospitalized with tuberculosis in Chigasaki, Kanagawa in 1926, he died on 26 October 1927. Only after his death and the publication of Mazushiki Shinto (Humble Believer), Yagi Jukichi Shishu (Yagi Jukichi Anthology), and Kami o yobō (Talk to God) did he gain widespread recognition.

== See also ==
- Japanese literature
- List of Japanese authors
