= Ikurō Teshima =

Founder of the Makuya movement (1910–1973)

Abraham Ikurō Teshima (手島アブラハム郁郎, Teshima Abraham Ikurō) (1910 – 24 December 1973) was the founder of the Makuya religious movement. A native of Kumamoto, Japan, he was baptized as a Protestant at the age of fifteen, and soon afterwards joined the Nonchurch Movement started by Uchimura Kanzō. Teshima was influenced by Uchimura's writings, studying under his disciple Tsukamoto Toraji and later joining the Nonchurch Movement. Other religious figures who made a great impact on Teshima's belief and religiosity include Toyohiko Kagawa, Sadhu Sundar Singh, and Martin Buber.

Teshima served as a civilian employee in Korea and China during World War II, and returned to Kumamoto in 1945. Two years later, a warrant was issued for his arrest after he opposed and obstructed the destruction of a local school building. He fled to Mount Aso in central Kyūshū, where he stayed in an inn for a long period, the place where he claims to have had a face-to-face encounter with God. Teshima returned home and discovered the warrant had been retracted. His experience at Mt. Aso compelled him to begin a life of ministry. He set up a Bible study group which quickly grew into a movement known as Genshi Fukuin Undo (lit., Original Gospel Movement), and then as Makuya. To grasp the inner truth of biblical religion, or the "Love of the Holy Spirit" as Teshima puts it, and to extol this existential love by embodying it, living accordingly was the essence of his religious life. Teshima died on Christmas Dawn in 1973.

== Teshima and Israel ==
Teshima was fervently identified with the cause of Israel, conceiving the establishment of the State of Israel and the unification of Jerusalem as a fulfillment of biblical prophecies. His group, Makuya, has sent young members to a number of kibbutzim in Israel and made pilgrimages to Jerusalem. "Over [900] Makuya students have been sent to Israeli kibbutzim to work together with the people of the Bible, and to study Hebrew and the biblical background. Some of them continue their academic studies in universities." The primary kibbutz the Makuya students stay at is Heftziba. Makuya has also appeared in front of the United Nations on at least two occasions, speaking on behalf of Israel.

In 1967, when the Six-Day War broke out, Teshima wrote a telegram to the Makuya students in Israel saying, "Stay as long as you can and help Israel". The students, accordingly, volunteered to aid Israel during the war. In 1973, when the Yom Kippur War broke out, the state of Japan supported Arab countries, caving in to an Arab oil embargo. This diplomatic policy frustrated Teshima. Despite his serious illness (terminal cirrhosis), Teshima organized, with 3,000 of his adherents, a campaign for Israel in front of the Diet building in Tokyo. It was the first pro-Israel demonstration ever held in Japan. The campaign received wide coverage in the press, radio, and television. However, it also worsened Teshima's illness and he died three weeks later on Christmas Dawn in 1973.

Teshima's name was inscribed twice on the Golden Book of the Jewish National Fund; once in September 1967, in honor of his staunch support for Israel during the Six-Day War and once in January 1974, honoring his passing. His unconditional love, devotion and support for Israel, which stemmed from his biblical faith is, to this day, carried on by the members of the Makuya movement.
