= Givat HaMivtar =

Settlement and neighborhood in East Jerusalem, Israel

Coordinates: 31°48′11.01″N 35°13′52.63″E

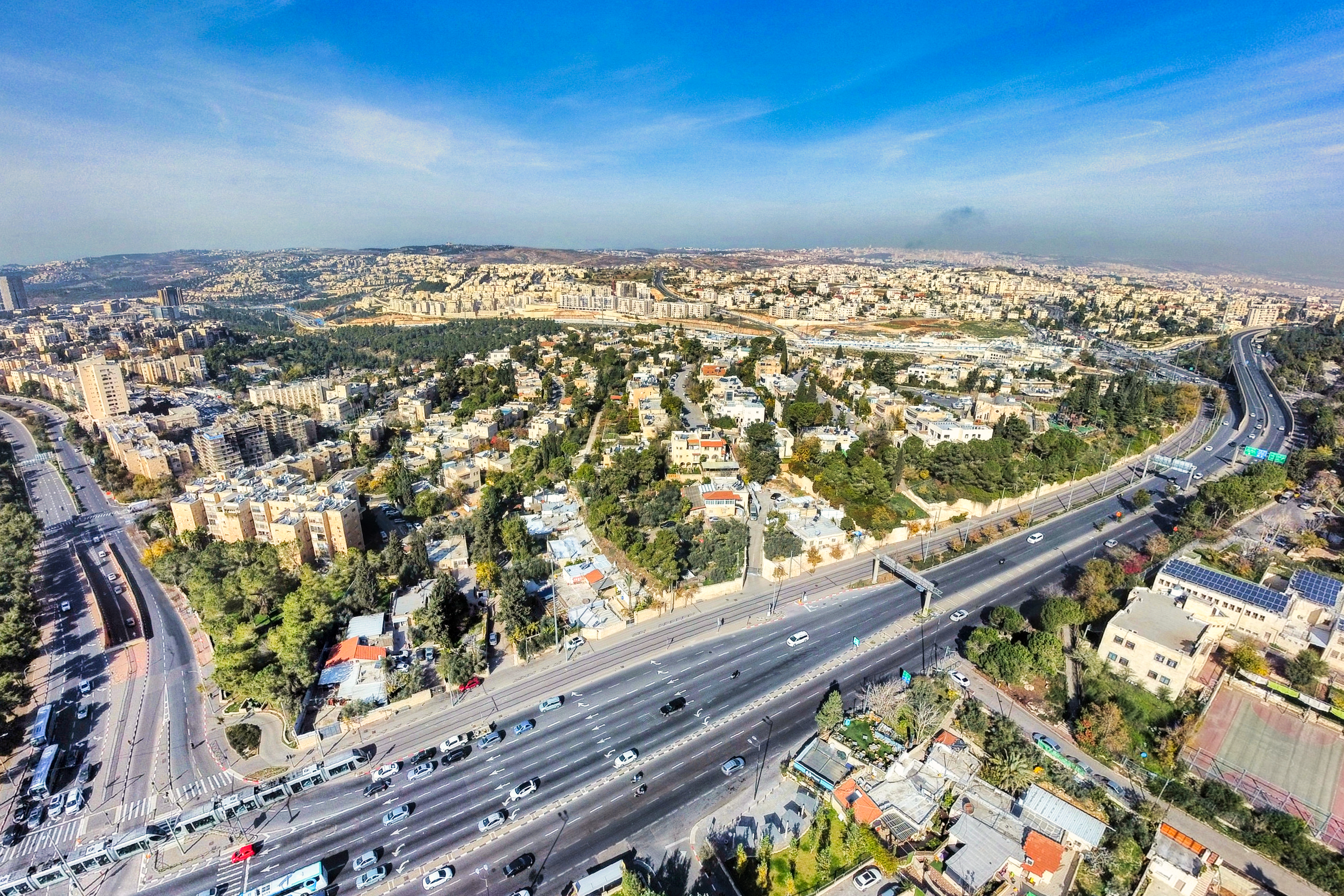
Givat Hamivtar

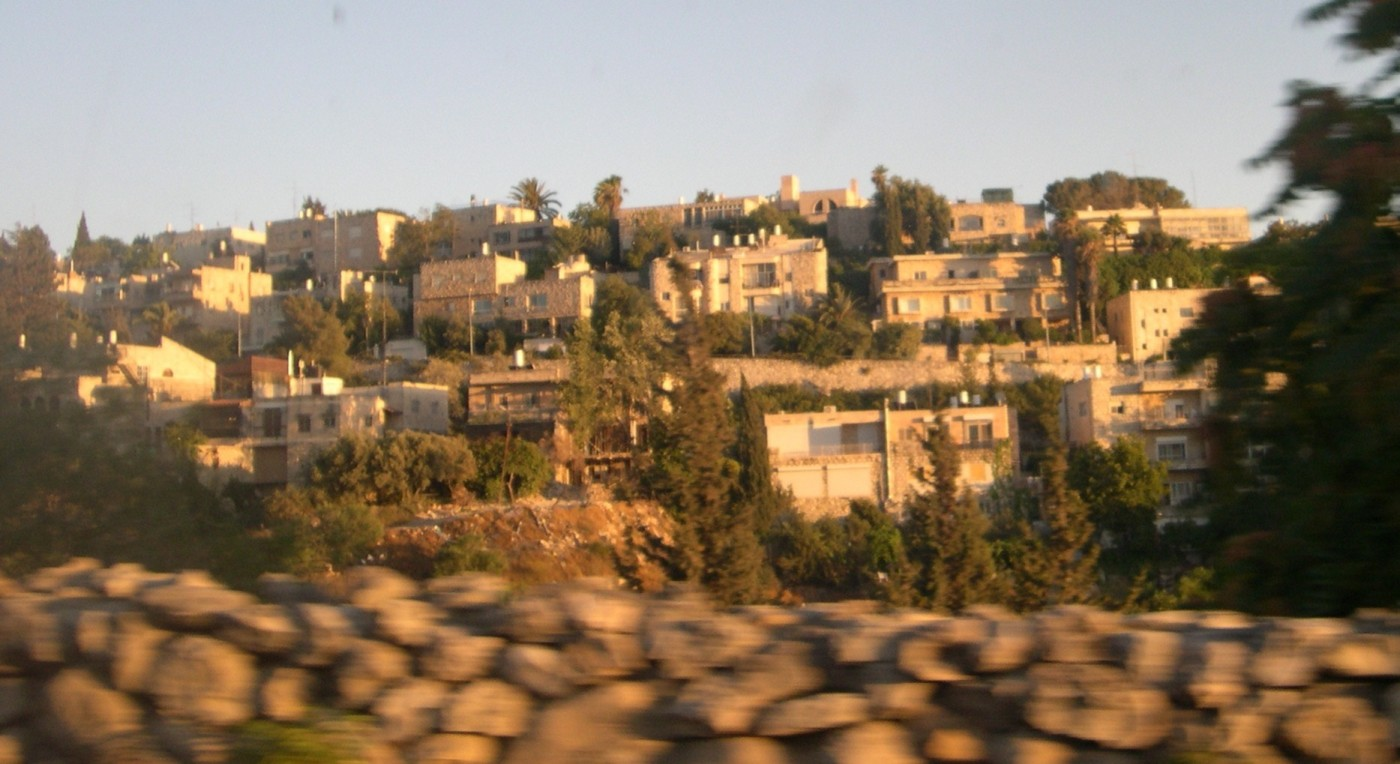
Givat Hamivtar, seen from north

Givat HaMivtar (Hebrew: גִּבְעַת הַמִּבְתָּר) is an Israeli settlement and a neighborhood in East Jerusalem established in 1970 between Ramat Eshkol and French Hill. It is located on a hill where an important battle took place in the Six Day War. Archaeological excavations have revealed important ancient Jewish tombs in the region. Givat Hamivtar was one of the first "Build Your Own Home" neighborhoods in Jerusalem.

The international community considers Israeli settlements in East Jerusalem illegal under international law, but the Israeli government disputes this.

== History ==
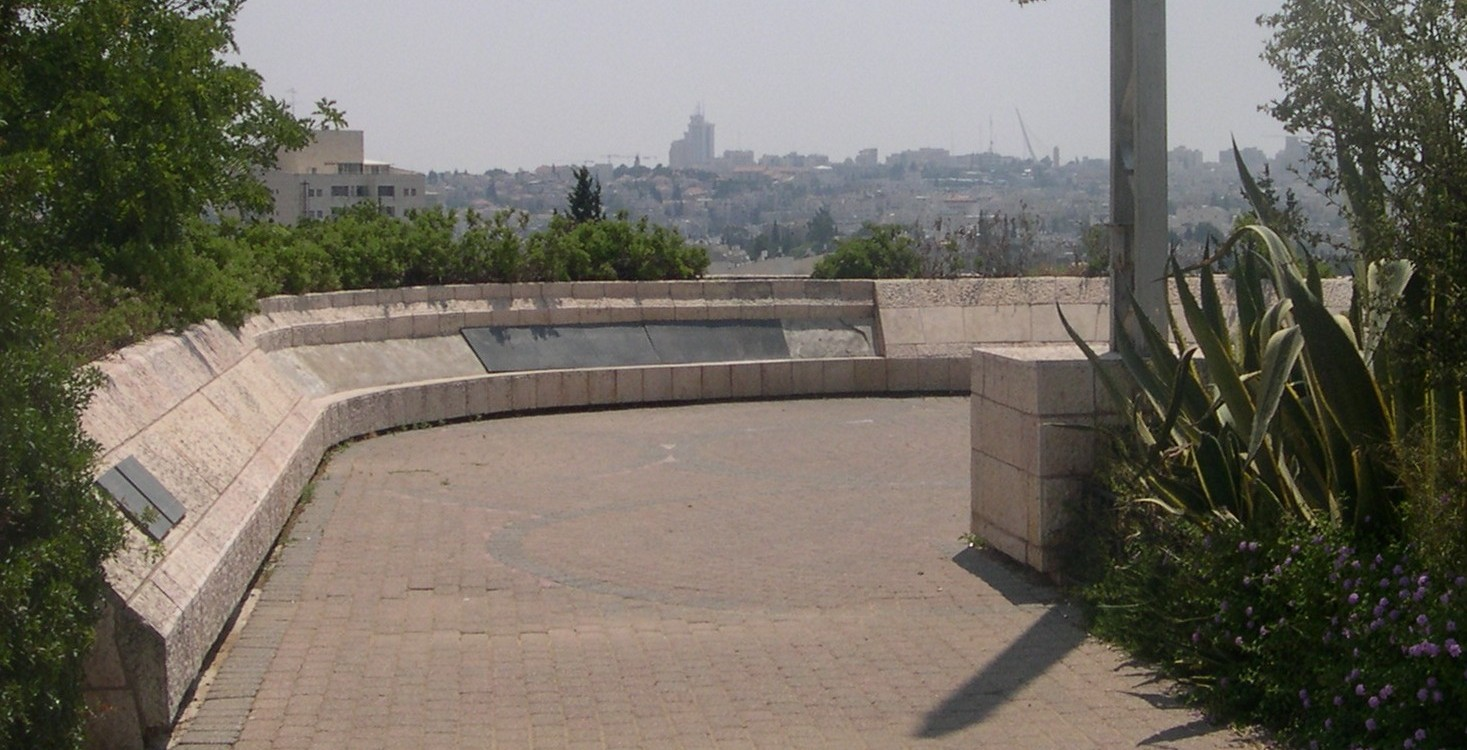
A view of Jerusalem from the Oded lookout in the neighborhood

The hill on which Givat Hamivtar was established was the site of a Jordanian fort, one of a series of military installations blocking Jewish access to Mount Scopus and cutting off Hadassah Hospital, the Hebrew University, and the National Library of Israel from West Jerusalem. The Jordanians called it Tal al-Mudura, lit. "round hill." Jordanian snipers used this strategic location to fire on Israeli troops during the Battle of Ammunition Hill. Givat HaMivtar was conquered by an Israeli tank force after two attempts. The first mission failed after an Israeli soldier was killed by friendly fire.

The Jerusalem neighborhood of Givat Hamivtar was planned as part of a sequence of Jewish neighborhoods called the bariah or "hinge" neighborhoods connecting west Jerusalem to Mount Scopus. The name of the neighborhood means "bissected hill," either referring to the crisscross of Jordan bunkers that existed before the neighborhood was built, or the earthworks cutting through Mount Scopus to create a road from Jerusalem's Old City to Nablus.

In July 1967, Prime Minister Levi Eshkol ordered government clerks to bypass the ordinary procedures to allow for Givat HaMivtar and the other hinge neighborhoods to be built as quickly as possible. When purchasing land encountered difficulties, some tracts were expropriated. To speed up the building process, land was subsidized by the government. Most of the homes in Givat HaMivtar were privately built. The majority of the homes were two-family homes, originally one-story high, to which a second and often a third floor was added over time.

== Archaeology ==
Numerous archeological digs have been carried out in Givat HaMivtar. Sepulchers discovered in the course of the digs were determined to be Jewish tombs of the Second Temple period.

=== Tomb of crucified man ===
One tomb yielded the only physical evidence for the Roman custom of crucifixion found to date. These were the remains of a person called Jehohanan Ben Khagqol, and they included a heel bone with a nail driven through it from the side. The tip of the nail was bent, perhaps because of striking a knot in the upright beam, which prevented it being extracted from the foot.

=== Tomb of "Simon, builder of the temple" ===
Another tomb, highly ornate, held the remains of the family of "Simon, builder of the temple" (Simon Bana Hekhalah), probably a builder of the Herodian Temple, as his name indicates.

=== Tomb of Abba ===
A third archaeologically interesting tomb on Givat HaMivtar is that of "Abba, son [descendant?] of the priest Eleazar, son [descendant] of Aaron the high (priest)." The inscription is in Aramaic, but written in the by then anachronistic ancient Hebrew script. In the tomb prepared for his family, Abba, who had been exiled to Babylon, secretly brought back to Jerusalem and buried the remains of "Mattathiah son of Juda(h)". Some believe that Mattathiah son of Judah was Antigonus II Mattathias, the exiled heir of the Kingdom of Judea. However, according to anthropologist Joe Zias, former Curator of Archaeology and Anthropology for the Israel Antiquities Authority, this theory is just little more than an urban myth, since the only beheaded skeleton found in 1971 and at the later reexamination of the previously untouched tomb, belonged to an elderly woman. In his view, no other set of remains found there could be associated with King Antigonus II.

== Services ==
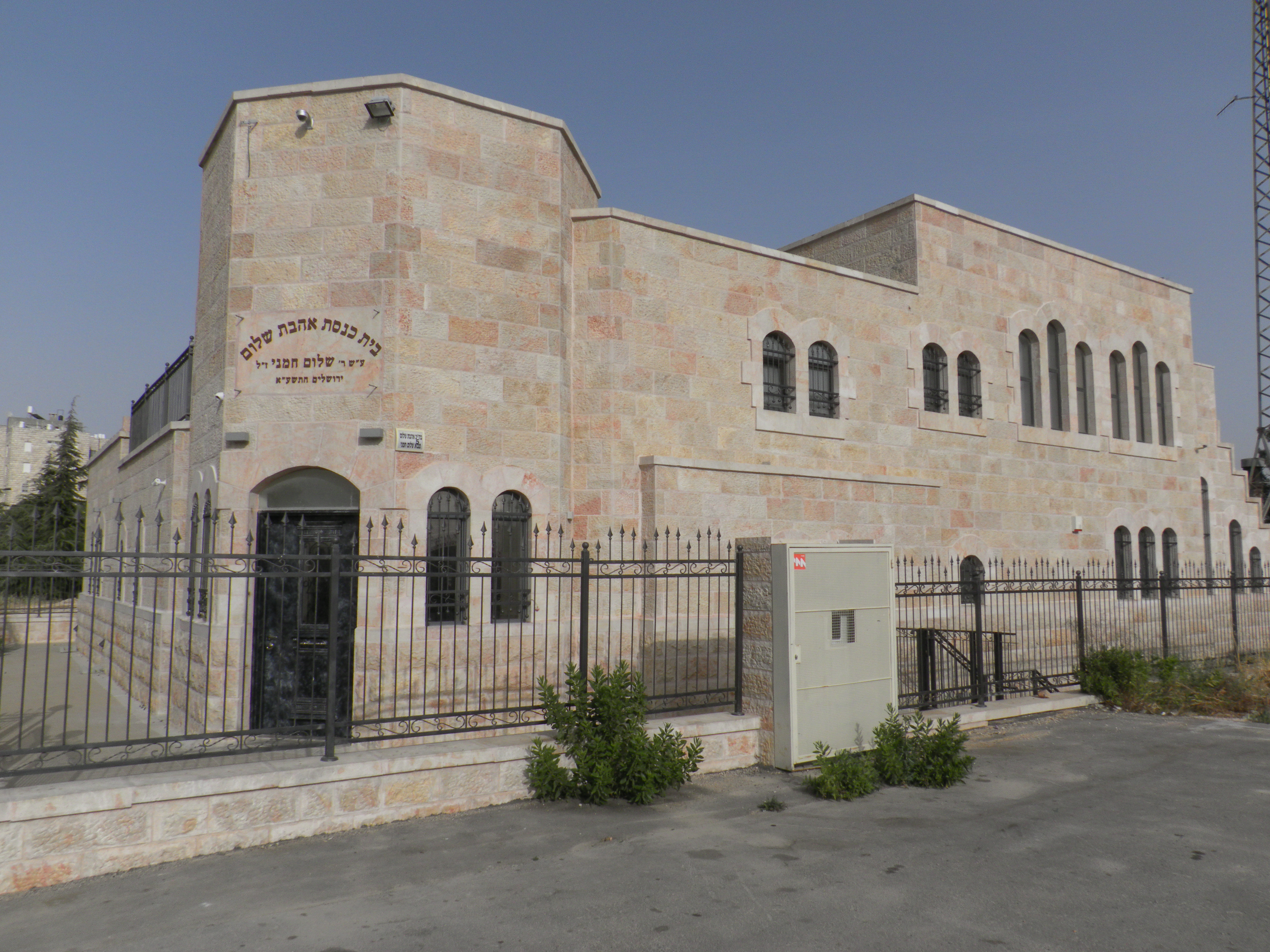
Sephardi synagogue

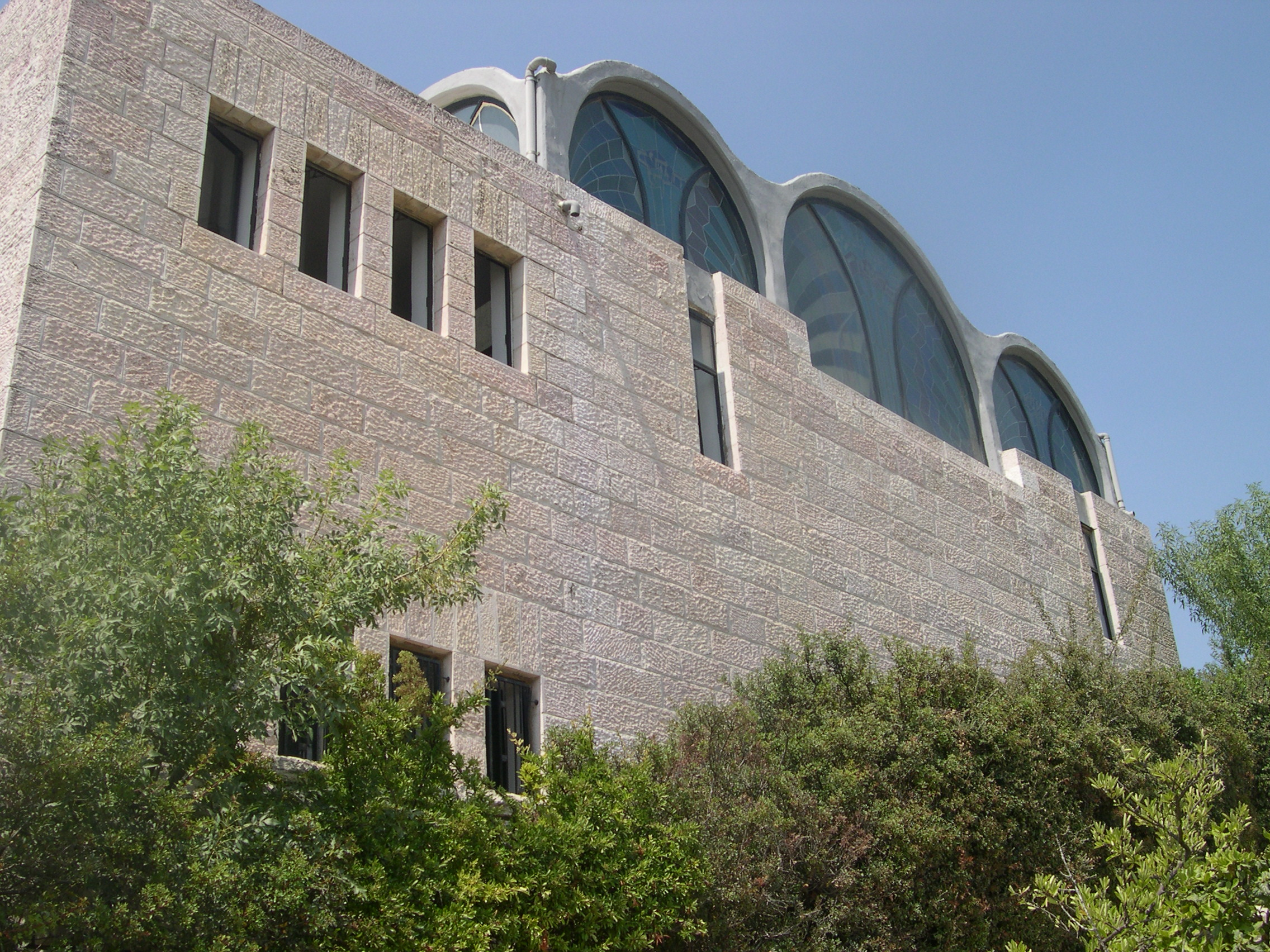
Joined Sepharadi and Ashkenazi synagogue

Givat HaMivtar has only preschools and kindergartens. The elementary schools of Ramat Eshkol were built on the border between the two neighborhoods in order to serve them both. High schools are located on French Hill and Ma'allot Dafna.

The first synagogue in Givat HaMivtar was unique in that prayer services followed a non-specific nusach so that Jews of all ethnic groups could pray there. In the first decade of this millennium, many of the neighborhood's secular and Modern Orthodox residents have moved out, and ultra-Orthodox Jews have become a majority.

Since the mid-1980s, there is a Makuya center in the neighborhood.

== Notable residents ==
- Shlomo Amar
- Gilad Atzmon
- Binyamin Ben-Eliezer
- Dror Etkes
- Joshua Matza
- Lilit Nagar
- Adir Zik
