= Tadao Yanaihara =

Japanese economist, educator and Christian pacifist

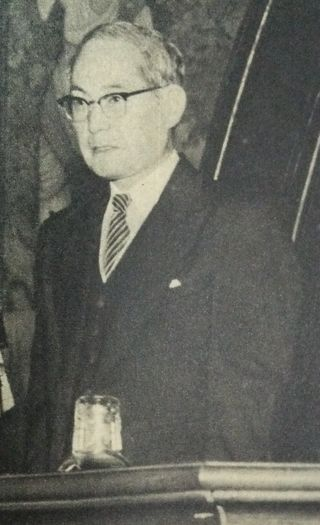
- Born: January 27, 1893; Ehime Prefecture, Japan
- Died: December 25, 1961 (aged 68)
- Education: Tokyo Imperial University
- Occupation: Economist

Tadao Yanaihara (矢内原 忠雄, Yanaihara Tadao; January 27, 1893 – December 25, 1961) was a Japanese economist, educator and Christian pacifist. He served as the 16th president of the University of Tokyo, after Shigeru Nambara. He was the first director of Shakai Kagaku Kenkyūjo (Institute of Social Science or Shaken) at the University of Tokyo.

== Life ==
He was born into a family of doctors in Ehime Prefecture. He was influenced by Uchimura Kanzō while studying at the First Higher School and became a Mukyokai Christian. He went on to study at the Faculty of Law at Tokyo Imperial University (today's University of Tokyo). He started working for the Sumitomo Headquarters after his graduation in 1917 but in 1921 returned to the university when his supervisor Nitobe Inazō became the secretary general of the League of Nations. However, Yanaihara's pacifist views and emphasis on indigenous self-determination, which he partly inherited from Nitobe – a Quaker and founding member of the League of Nations – came into a full conflict with Japan's wartime government during World War II. He was noted for his criticism of Japan's expansionist policies. As a result, Yanaihara was forced to resign from teaching under pressure by right-wing scholars in 1937. Yanaihara resumed teaching international economics at his alma mater, now named the University of Tokyo following the country's loss of the Second World War. He served as the president of the University from 1951 to 1957.

For critical studies of Yanaihara's legacy, see Yanaihara Tadao and Japanese Colonial Policy: Redeeming Empire, by Susan C. Townsend (Richmond: Curzon, 2000); and The Japanese Colonial Empire, 1895-1945, edited by Ramon H. Myers and Mark R. Peattie (Princeton: Princeton U.P., 1984).

== Support for the Zionist model ==
Yanaihara was interested in supporting and promoting Zionism as a model that Japan could emulate. "The Zionist movement," claimed Yanaihara, "is nothing more than an attempt to secure the right for Jews to migrate and colonize in order to establish a center for Jewish national culture." As Japan's colonialist expansion gained speed in Manchuria and Korea in the 1920s and 1930s, the Japanese government and especially the Manchukuo government showed interest in cooperative agricultural settlement similar to what scholars like Yanaihara documented in Palestine.

== Shokumin ==
He used the term shokumin (population migration) to discuss colonization and migration, highlighting the qualities of migration for the creation of a global civil society.

== Awards ==
- Senior Grade of the Third Court Rank
- Grand Cordon in the Order of the Sacred Treasure

== Biography ==
- Townsend, Susan C. (2000). Yanaihara Tadao and Japanese Colonial Policy: Redeeming Empire. Routledge. ISBN 0-7007-1275-5.
- Nakano, Ryoko (2013). Beyond the Western Liberal Order: Yanaihara Tadao and Empire as Society. Palgrave. ISBN 978-1-349-45058-9.
- Tadao, Yanaihara Zenshu (Complete Works of Tadao Yanaihara), 29 Vols. Tokyo: Iwanami Shoten, 1963–65.
