= Makuya =

Japanese religious movement

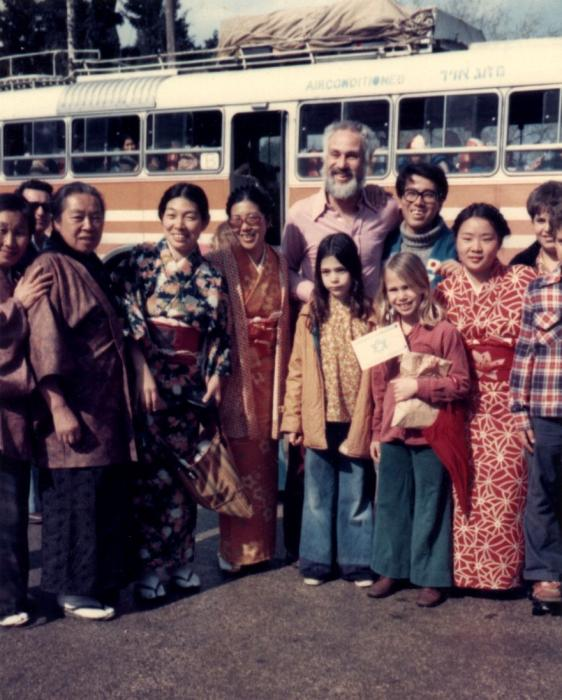
Makuya members visiting Israel

Makuya (幕屋), based at the Tokyo Bible Seminary, is a religious movement in Japan founded in 1948 by Ikurō Teshima. At the heart of its religious life is the aspiration to grasp the inner truth of “biblical religion”—what Teshima called the “Love of the Holy Spirit"—and to give expression to this love by embodying it in daily life.

"Makuya" is the Japanese equivalent of the Hebrew phrase אֹהֶל מוֹעֵד ohel mo'ed, meaning “dwelling place” or Tabernacle, the portable sanctuary where God promised to meet with the Israelites (Exodus 29:42–43). The term captures the basic religious orientation of the Makuya movement, which emphasizes the significance of a personal encounter with the divine presence in everyday life. Such an encounter, from the Makuya perspective, cannot be replaced by creeds or religious institutions. The portable Tabernacle thus symbolizes a faith that is not confined to fixed places of worship or institutional structures.

== Beliefs and tenets ==
The Makuyas stress "a return to the dynamic faith of the original Gospel of early Hebraic Christianity, as opposed to the dogmatic, institutionalized, European-dominated churches." In their view, when biblical religion was introduced to the Hellenistic world, its lively spirit was interpreted within Greek logic and eventually replaced by a set of creeds. The Makuyas seek to restore this original spirit by returning to the Jewish roots of Christianity and learning about the Bible accordingly.

Although rooted in both the Hebrew Bible and the New Testament, Makuya does not identify itself as a Christian denomination. Rather, it seeks to recover what it regards as the living essence of biblical faith, beyond the boundaries of established creeds and religious institutions.

The Makuyas are concerned about individual salvation and the spiritual restoration, or enhancement, of each nation and social group. For example, they regard the contemporary value system of Japanese society as spiritually impoverished, overtly self-centered, with little consideration of fundamental moral virtues, traditional heritage, or the common and public good of the society as a whole. Unlike nearly all other Christians in Japan, the Makuyas, instead, respect their cultural heritage and seek to inspire, or "re-awaken", as they put it, the "existential spirit of the Japanese people." In this respect, many Japanese Shintoists and Buddhists who share the same concern support Makuyas' cause. Further, while committed to sharing the original gospel, Makuya also emphasizes religious pluralism, tolerance, and peaceful coexistence, without insisting that adherents of other religions become members of the movement. Makuya thus understands itself primarily as a religious movement rather than a denomination, emphasizing openness rather than exclusivity.

Unlike other Christians, who use the Christian cross as their symbol, the Makuyas take the seven-armed Jewish menorah as their religious emblem, and they display it on their badges or pendants. They prefer to use the menorah as their religious symbol rather than the cross, because to them, the cross symbolizes "suffering," but the menorah is a symbol of "hope". The Makuyas have developed, or incorporated, a number of religious observances, customs, and rituals. They also engage in convocations, marriage ceremonies, and pilgrimages.

Today, the Makuya movement has about a hundred branches, including in Japan, Israel, the United States, Canada, Denmark, France, the United Kingdom, Spain, Mexico, Brazil, Paraguay, China, Taiwan, South Korea, India and Indonesia. Following, in part, the biblical tradition (2 Samuel 24), the movement does not conduct a census; hence, the exact number of its members remains unknown. However, it is known that about 300,000 copies of its major magazine, The Light of Life, are subscribed to and issued monthly.

For those Makuyas who live in Japan, more concretely, Teshima outlined a small number of tenets which he called "Our Beliefs" and they are intended to define the core beliefs of the Makuya:

- We lament over the spiritual deterioration of Japan and wish for the awakening of "Yamato Damashii" (大和魂, Japanese Spirit).
- We wish for the revival of religion in the hearts of the Japanese and pray for the restoration of the 'Original Gospel'.
- We stand on the basis of the non-Church spirit; therefore, we neither belong to nor create any churches or denominations. We solely learn from the Old and New Testaments.
- We wish for the purification of Christianity. However, we also cherish other religions of Japan and respect the personalities of their masters.
- Rising above the differences of political beliefs, we intend to sanctify Japanese society. We proclaim social justice and humanity with divine love, goodwill, and peace.

Christ said, "Come unto me, all ye that labour and are heavy laden, and I will give you rest." (Matthew 11:28)

== Makuya and Israel ==
Makuya is a group of enthusiastic supporters of Israel and the Jewish people. It sends young members to a number of kibbutzim in Israel, and makes pilgrimages to Jerusalem. "Over [900] Makuya students have been sent to Israeli kibbutzim to work together with the people of the Bible, and to study Hebrew and the biblical background. Some of them continue their academic studies in universities." The primary kibbutz the Makuya students stay at is Heftziba. Makuya has also appeared in front of the United Nations on at least two occasions, speaking on behalf of Israel.

In 1967, when the Six-Day War broke out, Teshima wrote a telegram to the Makuya students in Israel: "Stay as long as you can and help Israel." The students, accordingly, volunteered to aid Israel during the war. In 1973, when the Yom Kippur War broke out, the State of Japan supported Arab countries, caving in to an Arab oil embargo. This diplomatic policy frustrated Teshima. Despite his serious illness (terminal cirrhosis), Teshima, then, organized, with 3,000 of his adherents, a campaign for Israel in front of the National Diet Building in Tokyo. It was the first pro-Israel demonstration ever held in Japan. The campaign received wide coverage in the press, radio, and television. However, it also worsened Teshima's illness and he died three weeks later on Christmas Day 1973.

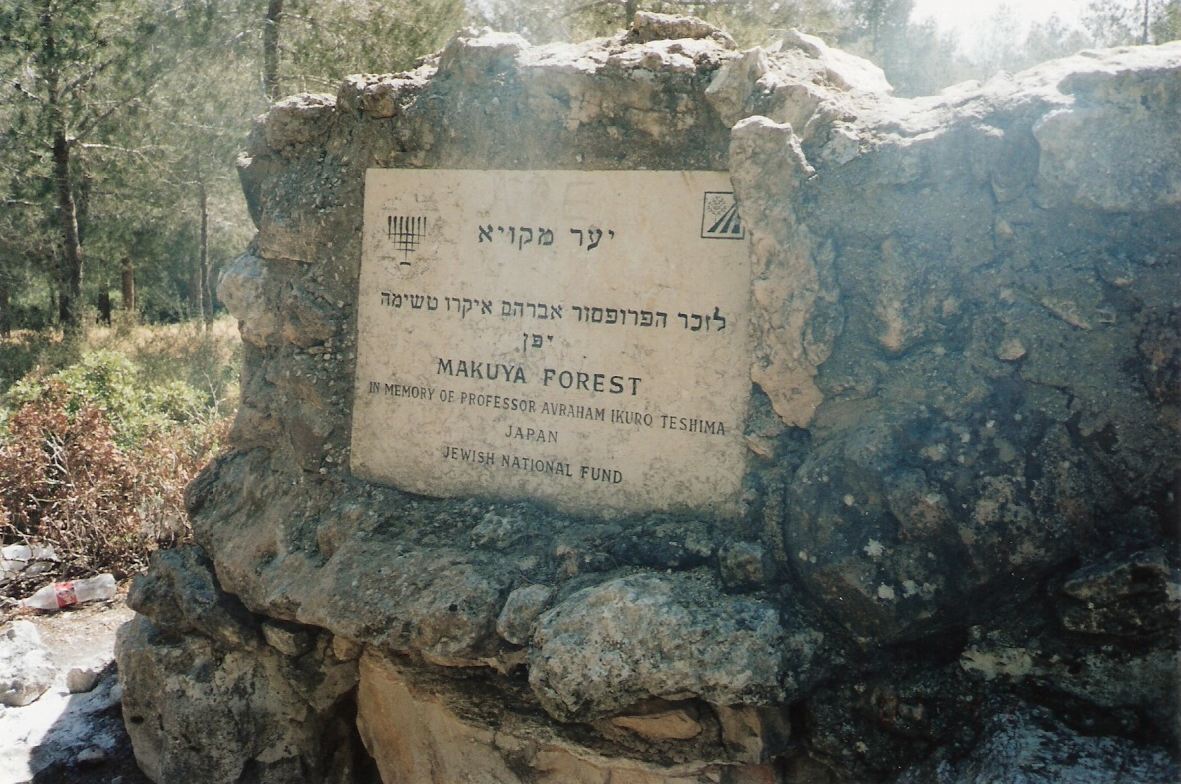
"Makuya Forest" sign

Teshima's name was inscribed twice on the Golden Book of the Jewish National Fund; once in September 1967 in honor of his staunch support for Israel during the Six-Day War and once in January 1974 honoring his passing. His unconditional love, devotion, and support for Israel that stemmed from his biblical faith is, to this day, carried on by the members of the Makuya movement.

The Jewish National Fund had planted a forest in memory of Teshima, located in the Lower Galilee. It was named "Makuya Forest".

== Origin ==
Teshima was influenced by the writings of Uchimura Kanzō, studying under his disciple Tsukamoto Toraji and joining the Non-church movement. Other religious figures who greatly impacted Teshima's beliefs and religiosity include Toyohiko Kagawa, Sadhu Sundar Singh, and Martin Buber.

In 1947, Teshima was accused of obstructing a municipal plan to destroy a local school in Kumamoto, Kumamoto Prefecture, and a warrant was issued for his arrest. Teshima fled to Mount Aso in central Kyushu where he stayed in an inn for several weeks, where he claims to have had a face-to-face encounter with God. Teshima returned home and discovered the warrant had been retracted. His experience at Mt. Aso compelled him to begin a life of ministry. He set up a Bible study group which quickly grew into a movement known as Genshi Fukuin Undo (lit., Original Gospel Movement), and then later Makuya. Its sympathizers included such religious thinkers and scholars as Otto A. Piper, Martin Buber, Abraham Joshua Heschel, Zalman Shazar, Hugo Bergmann, Zvi Yehuda Kook, André Chouraqui, and Yisrael Meir Lau.

== See also ==
- Christianity and Judaism
- Christian Zionism
- Groups claiming affiliation with Israelites
- Hebrew Roots
- Israel–Japan relations
- Japanese-Jewish common ancestry theory
- Jewish views on religious pluralism
- Judaizers
- Messianic Judaism
- Nazarene (sect)

== Films ==
- Jewish Soul Music: The Art of Giora Feidman (1980). Directed by Uri Barbash.
- A documentary movie of Teshima's Life in Japanese, Dawn of Makuya (Makuya-no Yoake) (2006). Directed by Mohri Tsuneyuki.
- The Makuya TV Program is currently broadcast in the west coast of the United States.
- In the 2009 Israeli comedy film A Matter of Size, a major character claims to be a Makuya in explaining why he immigrated to Israel from Japan. (He had previously told others that he came to Israel to escape Yakuza gangsters, Indian people, and Chinese soldiers, casting some doubt on this claim. The truth is never established and is not essential to the film.)
