= William S. Clark =

American chemist, botanist and college president (1826–1886)

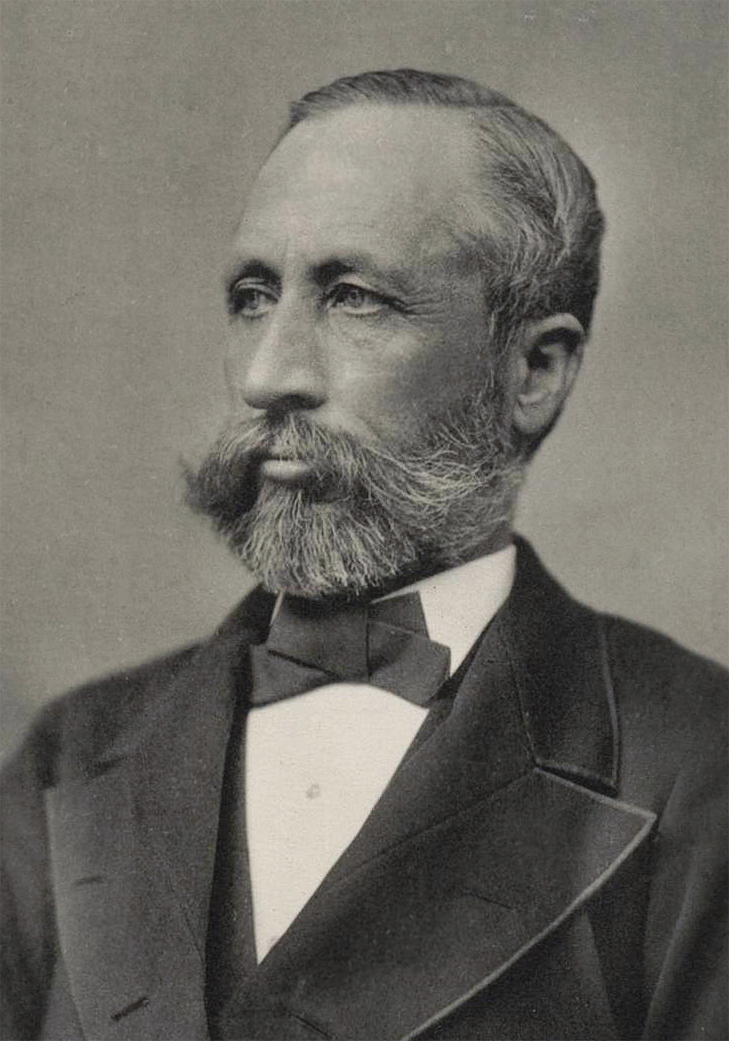
- William S. Clark c. 1876

President of the Massachusetts Agricultural College (now the University of Massachusetts Amherst)
- In office 1867–1879

President of the Sapporo Agricultural College (now the Hokkaido University)
- In office 1876–1877

Member of the Massachusetts House of Representatives
- In office 1864 – 1865, and 1867

Presidential Elector, 1864

Personal details
- Born: July 31, 1826 Ashfield, Massachusetts, U.S.
- Died: March 9, 1886 (aged 59) Amherst, Massachusetts, U.S.
- Relations: Hubert Lyman Clark (son)

Military service
- Allegiance: (United States) Union
- Branch/service: (United States) Union Army
- Years of service: 1861–1863
- Rank: Colonel
- Commands: 21st Massachusetts Volunteer Infantry Regiment
- Battles/wars: American Civil War

William Smith Clark (July 31, 1826 – March 9, 1886) was an American professor of chemistry, botany, and zoology; a colonel during the American Civil War; and a leader in agricultural education. Raised and schooled in Easthampton, Massachusetts, Clark spent most of his adult life in Amherst, Massachusetts. He graduated from Amherst College in 1848 and obtained a doctorate in chemistry from Georgia Augusta University in Göttingen in 1852. He then served as professor of chemistry at Amherst College from 1852 to 1867. During the Civil War, he was granted leave from Amherst to serve with the 21st Regiment Massachusetts Volunteer Infantry, eventually achieving the rank of colonel and the command of that unit.

In 1867, Clark became the third president of the Massachusetts Agricultural College (MAC), now the University of Massachusetts Amherst. He was the first to appoint a faculty and admit a class of students. Although initially successful, MAC was criticized by politicians and newspaper editors who felt it was a waste of funding in a state that was growing increasingly industrial. Farmers of western Massachusetts were slow to support the college. Despite these obstacles, Clark's success in organizing an innovative academic institution earned him international attention.

Japanese officials, striving to achieve rapid modernization of that country in the wake of the Meiji Restoration, were especially intrigued by Clark's work. In 1876, the Japanese government hired Clark as a foreign advisor to establish the Sapporo Agricultural College (SAC), now Hokkaido University. During his eight months in Sapporo, Clark successfully organized SAC, had a significant impact on the scientific and economic development of the island of Hokkaido, and made a lasting imprint on Japanese culture. Clark's visage overlooks Sapporo from several statues and his parting words to his Japanese students, "Boys, be ambitious!" (少年よ大志を抱け Shōnen yo, taishi o idake) have become a nationally known motto in Japan.

After resigning the presidency of MAC in 1879, Clark left academia to become the president of a mining company, Clark & Bothwell. The company, in operation from 1881 to 1882, purchased several silver mines, mostly in Utah and California. Clark's partner, John R. Bothwell, proved to be corrupt and the company quickly folded, destroying Clark's reputation, his own finances and the fortunes of many of his friends and family. The subsequent scandal ruined Clark's health. He died of heart disease at his home in Amherst in 1886.

== Education and early career ==
Born in Ashfield, Massachusetts, on July 31, 1826, William Smith Clark was the son of a country physician, Atherton Clark, and Harriet Smith Clark. In about 1834, his family moved to Easthampton, Massachusetts. Clark was educated at Williston Seminary (now the Williston Northampton School) in Easthampton, and entered Amherst College in 1844. He earned membership in the prestigious Phi Beta Kappa academic honor society and graduated in the class of 1848. Clark then taught chemistry at Williston Seminary from 1848 to 1850. In 1851, he departed to study chemistry and botany at Georgia Augusta University in Germany, now known as the University of Göttingen, where he earned his Ph.D. in chemistry in 1852.

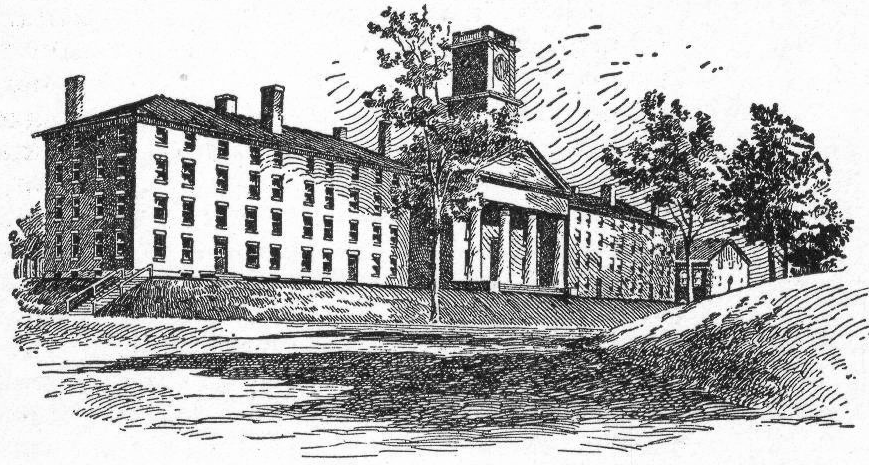
Amherst College chapel and original dormitories c. 1914

Later that year, Clark returned to Amherst and accepted a professorship in analytical and applied chemistry at Amherst College. He held that position until 1867. He also served as professor of zoology from 1852 to 1858, and of botany from 1854 to 1858. Shortly after his appointment, Clark began to promote agricultural education, a subject which had attracted his attention during his time in Göttingen. Beginning in 1853, he headed a new Division of Science for the theoretical and practical study of agriculture. The program was not successful, however, and was discontinued in 1857 due to poor enrollment. It became clear to Clark that a new type of institution would be necessary if agricultural education were to be taught effectively. He was a member of the Massachusetts Board of Agriculture from 1859 to 1861 and was the president of the Hampshire Board of Agriculture from 1860 to 1861, and later from 1871 to 1872. He used his position in these organizations to seek support for an agricultural college in Massachusetts.

== Family ==
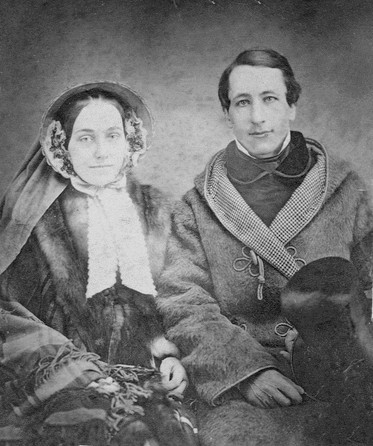
Clark with his wife, 1850s

A few months after returning home from Germany, on May 25, 1853, Clark married Harriet Keopuolani Richards Williston. Harriet Williston was the daughter of Clarissa and William Richards, American missionaries to the Kingdom of Hawaii. In 1838, Harriet and her brother Lyman were sent from Hawaii to be taken in by industrialist Samuel Williston so that they could be schooled at Williston Seminary in Easthampton. William Richards died in 1847 in Hawaii. His wife, Clarissa, survived him, however she remained in Hawaii for some time after her husband's death and it was agreed that Williston should adopt both Harriet and Lyman Richards. Clark's adoptive father-in-law, Samuel Williston, would prove to be an important sponsor to his career. Williston was Amherst College's primary benefactor, and a highly influential figure in western Massachusetts.

William and Harriet Clark had 11 children, only 7 of whom survived to adulthood. Their eldest child and daughter, Emily Williston Clark, married F.W. Stearns, the son of prominent trader and department store owner R.H. Stearns. One of their sons, Hubert Lyman Clark, became a prominent zoologist.

== Civil War ==
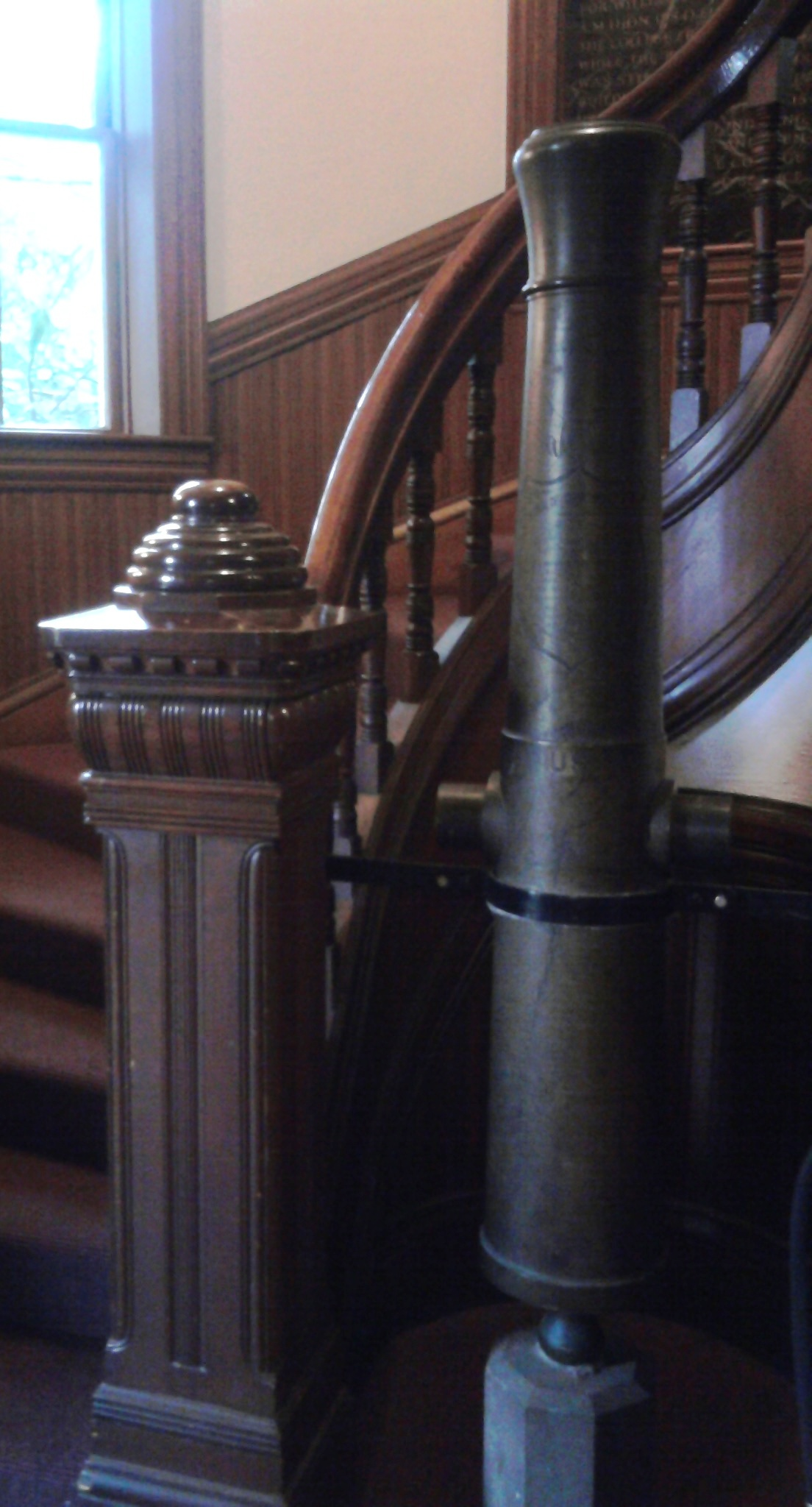
A brass cannon captured by the 21st Massachusetts Infantry, led by Clark during the Battle of New Bern. It is here shown in Morgan Hall at Amherst College.

Clark's academic career was interrupted by the Civil War. An enthusiastic supporter of the Union cause in the war, Clark took part in student military drill instruction at Amherst College and successfully recruited a number of students. In August 1861, he received a commission of major in the 21st Regiment Massachusetts Volunteer Infantry. He served with the 21st Massachusetts for nearly two years, eventually commanding that regiment as lieutenant colonel in 1862, and colonel from 1862 to 1863.

During its first months of service, the 21st Massachusetts was assigned garrison duty at the United States Naval Academy in Annapolis, Maryland. In January 1862, the regiment was attached to the Coast Division commanded by Major General Ambrose Burnside and embarked with the division for operations in North Carolina. Clark was placed in command of the regiment in February 1862 and led it in the Battle of New Bern on March 14, 1862. In that action, Clark garnered a reputation for bravery when the regiment charged a Confederate battery and he straddled an enemy cannon, urging his regiment forward. The gun was the first artillery piece captured by the Union Army during that engagement. It was presented by General Burnside to Amherst College in honor of Lieutenant Frazar Stearns, son of the president of Amherst College and adjutant of the 21st Massachusetts, who was killed in the battle. The cannon was mounted inside Morgan Hall at Amherst College.

After the 21st Massachusetts was transferred to Northern Virginia in July 1862, the regiment eventually became part of the Army of the Potomac and took part in several of the largest battles of the war including Second Bull Run, Antietam, and Fredericksburg. The regiment suffered its worst casualties during the Battle of Chantilly on September 1, 1862. In the confusion of the battle, fought in thick woods during a thunderstorm, Clark became separated from his regiment and wandered the Virginia countryside for four days before finding the army again. While he was missing, he was incorrectly listed as killed in action and an Amherst newspaper printed his obituary under the headline, "Another Hero Gone."

Clark's enthusiasm for the war waned considerably after the Battle of Fredericksburg during which the Union Army suffered severe casualties in repeated charges against a heavily fortified stone wall. In a January 1863 letter to a friend, Clark wrote that, although he still felt "the principles for which we fight are right and honorable," he was "disheartened and dissatisfied" with the government and the army. By April 1863, the numbers of the 21st Massachusetts had been so thinned by what Clark called the "cruel fate of war," that the regiment had virtually ceased to exist and Clark's command was only nominal. He therefore resigned his commission and returned to Massachusetts.

== Massachusetts Agricultural College ==
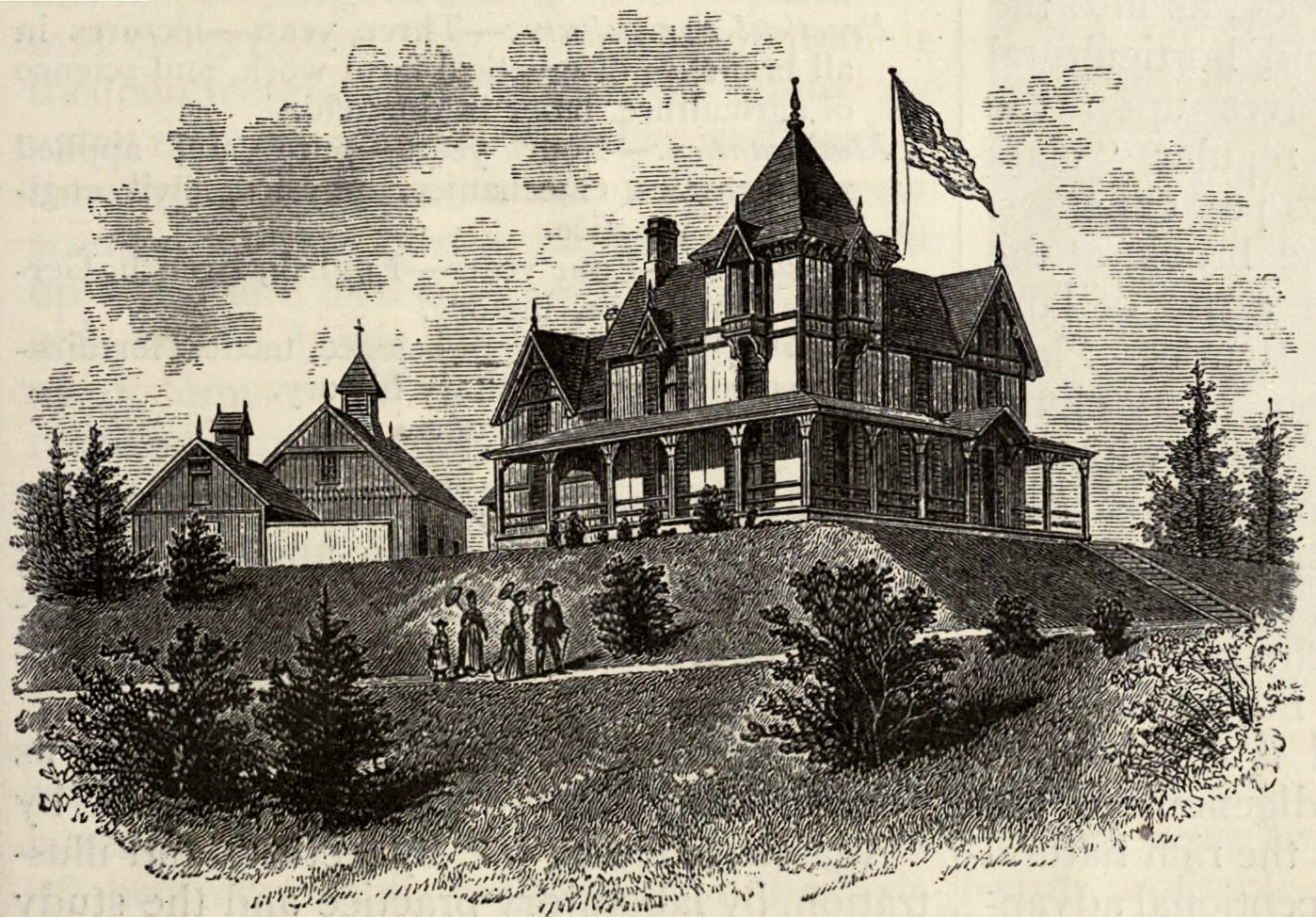
Clark's Amherst estate in 1875 adjacent to the campus of MAC. The house is now gone and a memorial to Clark was built on its site in 1991.

The movement for an agricultural college in Massachusetts had begun as early as the 1830s, long before Clark became involved. The leaders of the movement included men such as Marshall Wilder, a prosperous Boston merchant and president of the Norfolk Agricultural Society, and Judge Henry Flagg French, who would become the first president of the Massachusetts Agricultural College. Their efforts met with little progress until the passage of the Morrill Land Grant Act in 1862. Sponsored by U.S. Representative Justin Smith Morrill, the act allotted federal land in the West to each state. The proceeds from the sale of this land were to support the establishment of colleges "related to agriculture and the mechanic arts." Massachusetts voted to take advantage of this federal program and established the Massachusetts Agricultural College in April 1863.

Proponents of agricultural education, including Clark, felt that scientific advances were bypassing farmers as a class. Clark lamented that farmers in Massachusetts had little access to higher education and that, consequently, the profession was degenerating economically and intellectually. As Clark wrote,

In the good time coming, the refining, elevating, and strengthening influences of high intellectual and aesthetic culture will be considered as desirable in the agricultural profession as they are in medicine, law or theology ... If practical farmers are to remain ignorant of all the higher branches of learning, and to have only the mental discipline and culture of the country public schools, they can never occupy their proper position in society.

The farmer's "proper position in society" was in particular jeopardy in New England, according to leaders of the agricultural education movement. Increasing industrialization caused the population of mill towns to grow exponentially in the mid-19th century at the expense of rural towns, many of which were left all but abandoned, especially in western Massachusetts. Adding to the crisis was the phenomenon of westward movement and the lure of cheap land in the Midwest. The agricultural education movement in Massachusetts, in reaction to this crisis, had highly moralistic tones. Clark criticized those who left New England, writing, "Will a wise man exchange the beautiful and diversified scenery of New England ... Will he forsake the school and churches and the social privileges of prosperous communities for the semi-barbarous condition of newly and sparsely settled districts?" Further, Clark warned that if the decay of rural Massachusetts continued, farming would soon be considered, "degrading in its nature, and designed ... only for those poor, stupid, ignorant, or unfortunate persons."

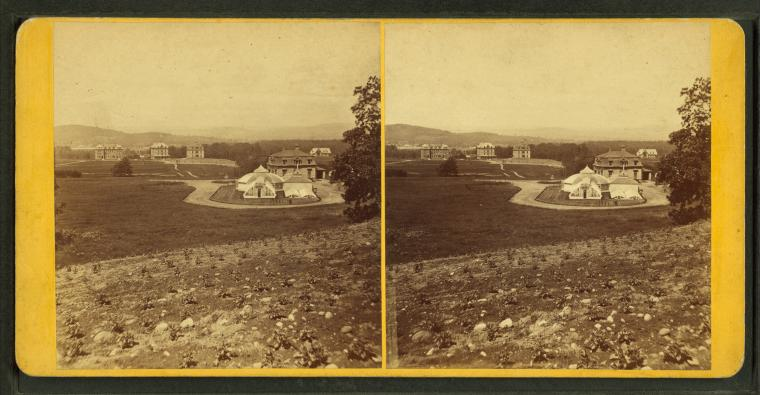
Stereograph view of the campus of MAC c. 1875

Clark resigned his commission in the army one month after the MAC was voted into existence by the Massachusetts Legislature. When he returned to Amherst, he quickly sought involvement in the new institution and worked energetically to convince state authorities to locate the college in Amherst. Rival sites under consideration included Springfield, Lexington, and property owned by Harvard University in Roxbury. Elected to the Massachusetts Legislature in 1864, Clark secured a bond for the Town of Amherst enabling it to contribute $50,000 to the construction of the college buildings. This ultimately swayed the trustees to choose Amherst.

MAC went through two presidents in its first four years and by 1867 still did not have a faculty, nor students, nor finished buildings. Clark became president of the college in 1867 and immediately appointed a faculty and completed a plan for building construction. Clark's decisive management enabled the college to admit its first class of 49 students. In addition to being president, he was professor of botany and horticulture.

Although initially regarded as a great success, the college saw poor enrollment over the course of the 1870s. Clark was particularly disappointed with the lack of support from the farming community, writing, "To one who understands fully the greatness of the work which has been done in Amherst … the utter indifference in regard to the college manifested by most of the 75,000 farmers of Massachusetts is truly astounding."

By the end of his presidency of MAC, Clark was falling under increasing criticism from the press and politicians in Boston. MAC, mounting an increasing debt, was declared a failure by some. Infuriated by what he called, "time-serving politicians and unprincipled newspapers seeking only to float on the tide of public opinion," Clark resigned in 1879.

Clark was one of the commission of three, appointed by Massachusetts governor John Albion Andrew in 1863, to consider the expediency of establishing a state military academy. He was a presidential elector in 1864, and a representative to the Massachusetts House of Representatives in 1864–1865 and 1867. He was a member of a number of scientific societies. In 1868, Clark was elected a Fellow of the American Academy of Arts and Sciences

== Japan ==
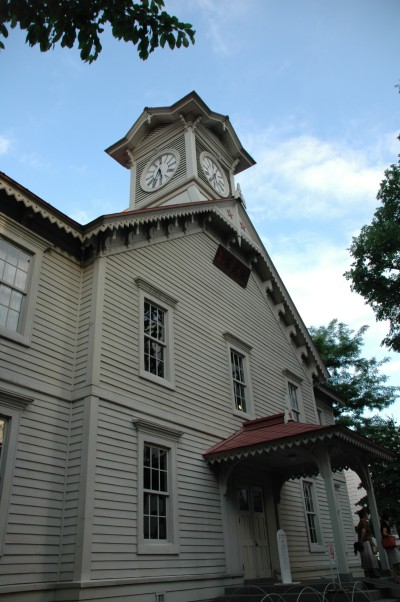
The Sapporo Clock Tower, of Western architectural design, was formerly the drill hall of the Sapporo Agricultural College. Built in 1878 and now a museum, it is one of the city's best known historic landmarks.

In 1876, Clark was invited by the government of Japan to establish the Sapporo Agricultural College, now Hokkaido University. Following the Meiji Restoration in 1867, the new Imperial government of Japan set out upon a path of rapid modernization and recruited many European and American academics and military experts to help expedite the process. These men were referred to by the Japanese government as oyatoi gaikokujin or "hired foreigners".

Seeking a model agricultural college, Mori Arinori, the Japanese Minister to the United States, asked Horace Capron, Commissioner of the U.S. Department of Agriculture, for a recommendation. Capron recommended MAC. After visiting the college, Minister Mori later recommended Clark to the Japanese government as the ideal candidate to establish SAC.

Clark signed his contract with the Japanese government on March 3, 1876, in Washington, DC. Due to inconsistencies in translation, discrepancies exist to this day as to what Clark's official title was. According to biographer John Maki, the Japanese and English versions of Clark's contract differed on this point. The Japanese version named Clark, "head teacher (namely, assistant director)." Because of this, in Japan, Clark has been referred to as "assistant director" or sometimes "vice-president" of SAC. However, in the English version of the contract, "the word 'President' was inserted into the text and initialed by Yoshida Kiyonari (the Japanese Minister to the United States at the time)." Regardless of title, Clark enjoyed the complete support of the Japanese government in organizing SAC and he exerted principal authority over the college while he was in Japan.

Clark spent eight months in Sapporo from 1876 to 1877. After enduring negative press in Massachusetts, he was pleased with the enthusiastic cooperation he received from the Japanese government. SAC was organized in just one month. Clark wrote to his wife, "I am actually rebuilding MAC ... on the other side of the earth." In establishing SAC, Clark introduced the first American model farm and barn in Japan and the first college military unit in the country. He also introduced new crops and new techniques in agriculture, fishing, and animal husbandry.

Clark's direct superior while working at SAC was the Governor of Hokkaido (and future Prime Minister of Japan) Kuroda Kiyotaka. The two men greatly respected one another and shared a bond in that they both had past military experience. Their positive relationship facilitated Clark's many accomplishments while in Sapporo and accounted for the wide latitude Clark was given in implementing not just SAC programs, but also his influence on the colonial development of Hokkaido.

Hokkaido represented the Japanese frontier at that time and with so much work to be done in colonizing the island, Kuroda welcomed and frequently implemented Clark's advice. Clark submitted recommendations to the governor on such diverse subjects as converting migratory fisherman into permanent colonists and establishing a textiles industry. In fact, Clark himself was taken aback by the apparent scope of his influence on colonial affairs, writing to his wife, "Governor Kuroda consults me constantly and always follows my advice." He later wrote, "I tremble to think how much confidence is reposed in me and what responsibilities I am daily assuming."

Clark not only had a significant impact on colonial development, but also had a powerful personal effect on the first students of SAC. The same rhetoric of ambition and personal elevation he had employed at MAC resonated more deeply with his Japanese students and, further, with a Japanese nation just emerging from a rigid feudal caste system. During classroom lectures, informal evening talks, and outings to collect botanical specimens, Clark discussed morality and urged his students to, "Be gentlemen."

Although the Japanese government prohibited the teaching of the Bible in government schools, Clark managed, after considerable effort, to secure approval from Kuroda to make use of the Bible during ethics instruction. In doing so, Clark introduced (Protestant) Christian principles to the first entering class of the college. They, in turn, influenced the students in the second class who enrolled after Clark's departure. In 1877, 31 students of SAC converted to Christianity, signing a document drafted by Clark titled, "The Covenant of Believers in Jesus." Some of them later played important roles in the fields of Christianity, education, and international relations during Japan's continuing modernization in the early 20th century. Alumni such as Uchimura Kanzō (founder of the non-church movement, a Japanese Christian society) and Nitobe Inazō (Quaker, educator and diplomat), still known nationwide in Japan, were from the second entering class of the College.

During his stay in Hokkaido, Clark examined the local flora and introduced new species of plants and trees from Japan to the United States. He sent to Massachusetts a large assortment of seeds, many of which proved of special value to his own state, on account of the high latitude from which they were selected. In Teine-ku, Sapporo, he discovered a new lichen on the side of Mt. Teine, at an elevation of 3,200 feet (980 m), which was named Cetraria clarkii, in his honor, by Edward Tuckerman.

On the day of Clark's departure, April 16, 1877, students and faculty of SAC rode with him as far as the village of Shimamatsu, then 13 miles (21 km) outside of Sapporo. As recalled by one of the students, Masatake Oshima, after saying his farewells, Clark shouted, "Boys, be ambitious!" These words can be found on many public buildings in Hokkaido. Several differing versions of Clark's parting words persist today including, "Boys, be ambitious, like this old man!" and, "Boys, be ambitious for Christ!" A painting of Clark's departure, rendered in 1971, hangs in the Prefectural Capitol building in Sapporo and includes a lengthier version of his parting words, "Boys, be ambitious! Be ambitious not for money or for selfish aggrandizement, not for that evanescent thing which men call fame. Be ambitious for that attainment of all that a man ought to be."

== Later career ==
After his retirement from MAC, Clark became interested in a scientific floating college proposed by entrepreneur and real estate developer James O. Woodruff. This innovative concept attracted national attention and planning moved swiftly. Funds were procured and Clark was named President of the Faculty. Before the enterprise could get underway, Woodruff's sudden death caused the abandonment of the scheme.

Following this setback, Clark decided to depart from academia and teamed up with John R. Bothwell in 1880 to form the Clark & Bothwell mining company. For Clark, mining was a logical extension of his background in chemistry and geology. Exactly how Clark became associated with Bothwell, a man of questionable character who had been cashiered from the U.S. Army for fraud, is unknown. As an academic, Clark was ill-prepared for a financial career. This, coupled with Bothwell's disreputable history, would result in a short life for the firm.

The firm of Clark & Bothwell opened for business on March 10, 1881, with offices at the corner of Nassau and Wall Street in New York City. The first mine in which the company became invested was the Starr-Grove silver mine, just south of present-day Battle Mountain, Nevada. By the end of 1881 the company, with Clark as President, was involved in seven silver mines, predominantly in Utah and California. Although focused on the American West, the company had far-reaching interests spreading from Mexico to Nova Scotia. The Satemo Mining Company of Tangier, Nova Scotia (named by Clark after a Japanese word which, according to his translation, meant "all right") became a subsidiary of Clark & Bothwell in the summer of 1881. The company was among the first involved in the Nova Scotia gold rush of that period.

In managing these mines, Clark took an active role as President. He traveled thousands of miles, recommending improvements to mills and machinery and overseeing the improvements. Meeting initial success, the company's worth soon amounted to millions of dollars. The good fortune extended throughout the town of Amherst where, according to biographer John Maki, there was a "craze in mining stocks" as Clark's friends, family, and former academic colleagues became heavily invested in the company. There were also substantial investors in New York, Boston, Philadelphia and other cities.

The first sign of serious trouble for the company came in March 1882 when the Starr-Grove mine shut down due to lack of profit and increasing debt. The stock values of Clark & Bothwell's various mines immediately plunged and were soon unsaleable. The first of what was to be several lawsuits for investment money lost was brought in April 1882. The most damaging development came when one of the subsidiaries, the Stormont Mining Company, sued Clark & Bothwell for funds withheld from Stormont. It soon became apparent that Bothwell, as Treasurer, had mismanaged affairs at the company's New York office resulting in the firm's collapse. By May 1882, Bothwell was en route to San Francisco and was never heard from again. The scandal was national news and the resulting lawsuits played out in New York and New England newspapers.

Although Clark maintained that he had been "taken in" by Bothwell, his reputation in Amherst was nonetheless destroyed. The stresses of the scandal ruined Clark's health, and for the last four years of his life, Clark was largely confined to his home in Amherst due to heart disease. He died in Amherst on March 9, 1886, and is buried in Amherst's West Cemetery.

== Legacy ==
Although he is almost forgotten in his home state of Massachusetts, Clark remains a national figure in Japan. His influences on the agricultural and economic development of Hokkaido were significant, but it is primarily his cultural message that still resonates today. According to historian Fumiko Fujita, Clark's phrase, "Boys, be ambitious!" is "almost immortal in Japan." The Japanese National Tourism Organization describes the slogan as "famous" and often quoted throughout the country. Historian John Maki wrote that many Japanese school textbooks "have carried brief accounts of [Clark's] work and his slogan", and that Clark's name appears on "schools, buildings, shops, confections and countless tourist souvenirs."

Clark's missionary activities produced the Sapporo Independent Christian Church in 1882, founded by students of SAC. It was one of the first cells of Christianity in Japan after the Meiji Restoration. Eventually, ten of the signers of Clark's "Covenant in the Believers of Jesus," raised funds to build the William S. Clark Memorial Church in Sapporo in 1922. The church was demolished in 1962, but rebuilt in another location and still houses the original "Covenant" as well as several Bibles Clark brought to Sapporo.

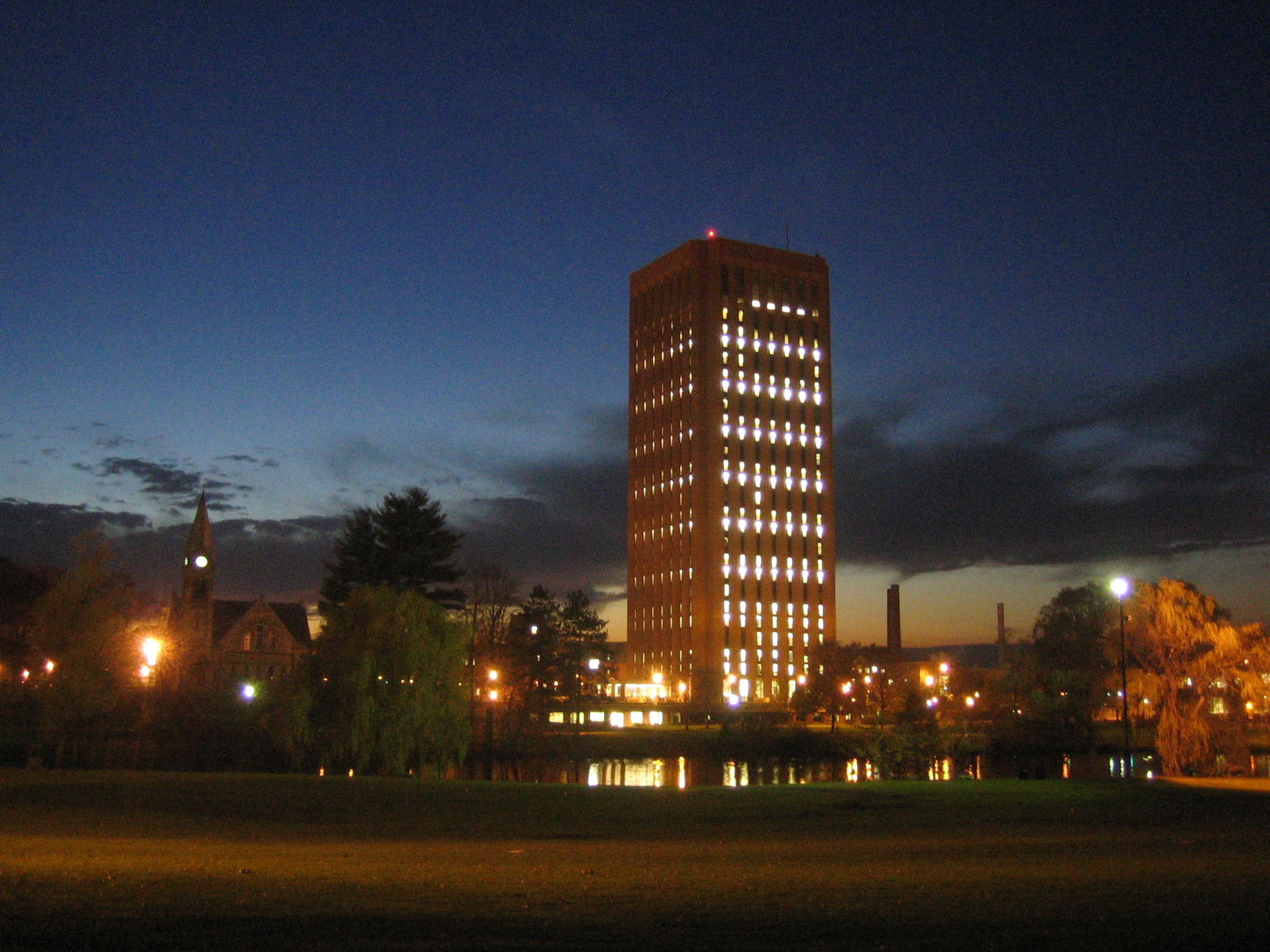
Campus of the University of Massachusetts Amherst, the W.E.B. DuBois Library at center

In the United States, Clark's primary legacy is one of ongoing cooperation between the two colleges he founded, now the University of Massachusetts Amherst and the Hokkaido University. Student and faculty exchanges were informal for many years until, according to journalist Daniel Fitzgibbons, the early 1960s when "the U.S. State Department contracted with the University to help strengthen the agricultural curriculum at Hokkaido. Through that program, 11 UMass faculty went to Sapporo and 52 Japanese faculty and students received advanced training in Amherst." Both universities maintain exchange programs through various academic departments.

In 1969, Professor John H. Foster of the Center for International Agricultural Studies designated the collaboration between the institutions as "the oldest technical assistance relationship between a U.S. university and a foreign university." In recognition of this fact, and of Clark's role in establishing the two colleges, the University of Massachusetts Amherst and the University of Hokkaido became sister universities in 1976. On February 7, 1990, the Commonwealth of Massachusetts and the prefecture of Hokkaido became sister states.

One of the first public works of art in honor of Clark's legacy was a bust placed on the campus of the Hokkaido University in 1926 commemorating the 50th anniversary of the establishment of SAC. The original bust was melted down during World War II, but reconstructed in 1947. To mark the 100th anniversary of Clark's arrival in Sapporo, the statue of Clark at Hitsujigaoka observation hill was built in 1976. Etched on the base of the statue are Clark's famous words, "Boys, Be Ambitious." The site is a popular tourist destination. Finally, on the campus of the University of Massachusetts Amherst, the William Smith Clark Memorial, a 0.5-acre (0.20 ha) stone and sculptural garden, was dedicated on October 17, 1991. It is located on the former site of Clark's house at the peak of Clark Hill. The memorial was designed by landscape architect Todd A. Richardson.

Buildings named after Clark include Clark Hall at the University of Massachusetts Amherst, originally constructed in 1905 to house the Department of Botany, and the Clark Memorial Student Center, built on the campus of the Hokkaido University in 1960, the first and largest western-style collegiate student center in Japan.

== Works ==
Contributions to Liebig's Annalen:

- "Ueber Chlormagnesium-Ammoniak" (1851)
- "Analyse des Steinmarks aus dem Sächsischen Topasfels" (1851)
- "Analysen von Meteoreisen" (1852)

Papers contributed to the annual reports of the Massachusetts Board of Agriculture:

- "Report on Horses" (1859–60)
- "Professional Education the Present Want of Agriculture" (1868)
- "The Work and the Wants of the Agricultural College" (1868)
- "The Cultivation of the Cereals" (1868)
- "Nature's Mode of Distributing Plants" (1870)
- "The Relations of Botany to Agriculture" (1872)
- "The Circulation of Sap in Plants" (1873)
- "Observations on the Phenomena of Plant-Life" (1874)
- "Agriculture in Japan" (1878)

In 1869 he translated Scheerer's Blow-pipe Manual for use at MAC.

== See also ==
- Nitobe Inazō Author of Bushido
- Uchimura Kanzō the founder of the Nonchurch Movement

== Works cited ==
- Adams, Donald K. (1970). Education and Modernization in Asia. Reading, Massachusetts: Addison-Wesley Publishing Co. OCLC 65337.
- Barron, Hal S (1984). Those Who Stayed Behind: Rural Society in Nineteenth Century New England. New York: Cambridge University Press. ISBN 0-521-25784-0.
- Bowen, James L. (1889). Massachusetts in the War, 1861–1865. Springfield, Massachusetts: Clark W. Bryan & Co. OCLC 1986476.
- Browne, Patrick T.J (2008). "Cultivation of the Higher Self: William Smith Clark and Agricultural Education". Historical Journal of Massachusetts. 36 (Winter 2008). Westfield State College. ISSN 0276-8313.
- Duke, Benjamin C. (2009). The History of Modern Japanese Education: Constructing the National School System, 1872–1890. Piscataway, New Jersey: Rutgers University Press. ISBN 978-0-8135-4648-3.
- ""Boys, be ambitious!" Ni tsuite" "Boys, be ambitious!" について [About "Boys, be ambitious!"] (PDF). Yuin Hokkaido University Library Bulletin (in Japanese). 29. Hokkaido University Library: 244–245. June 1972. Archived from the original (PDF) on March 8, 2022., translation available at "A well-known phrase: "Boys, be ambitious!"". Hokkaido University Library. Archived from the original on February 27, 2025.
- Konishi, Masakazu (December 12, 2008). The History of Neuroscience in Autobiography. Vol. 6. Oxford University Press. ISBN 978-0-19-970172-8.
- Maki, John M. (2002). A Yankee in Hokkaido: The Life of William Smith Clark. Lanham, Maryland: Lexington Books. ISBN 0-7391-0417-9.
- McDougall, Walter A. (1993). Let the Sea Make a Noise: A History of the North Pacific from Magellen to Macarthur. Perennial. ISBN 978-0060578206.
- Rand, Frank Prentice (1933). Yesterdays at Massachusetts State College. Amherst: Associate Alumni of the Massachusetts State College. OCLC 1581093.
- Lu, Sidney Xu (August 2019). "Eastward Ho! Japanese Settler Colonialism in Hokkaido and the Making of Japanese Migration to the American West, 1869–1888". The Journal of Asian Studies. 78 (3): 521–547. doi:10.1017/S0021911819000147.
- Tuttle, Marjorie (1992). "The William Smith Clark Memorial" (PDF). UMass Arts Council, et al. Archived from the original (PDF) on July 20, 2011.
- Walcott, Charles F. (1882). History of the Twenty-First Regiment Massachusetts Volunteers. Boston: Riverside Press. OCLC 53864897.
