= Adir Zik =

Israeli television producer and journalist

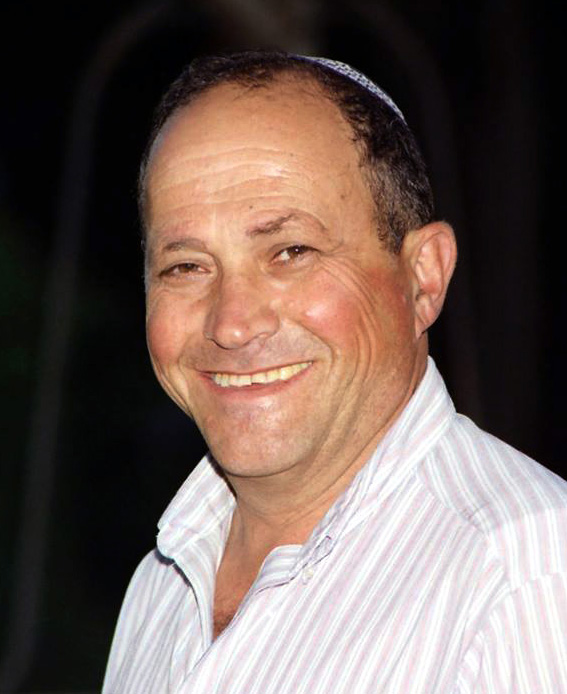
Adir Zik

Adir Zik (Hebrew: אדיר זיק; March 3, 1939 – February 6, 2005) was an Israeli television producer and journalist.

== Biography ==
Adir Zik was born in Tel Aviv to a secular Jewish family. As a teenager, he was a member of the left-wing youth movement HaShomer Hatzair, but was drawn to religion and became an observant Jew.

In 1964, after serving in the Israel Defense Forces, he studied television and radio broadcasting at the University of California. There he served as an emissary for the religious youth movement Bnei Akiva. Zik was married and the father of six children. He died in 2005 at the age of 66 after a six-year battle with cancer. He was buried on the Mount of Olives.

== Media career ==
Upon returning to Israel, he helped to found Israel Television (now Channel One). For 15 years, he was the host of a popular Friday morning radio program on Arutz 7 called Zikukim shel Adir, (lit. Adir's Fireworks, a pun on his name) commenting on news, politics and Jewish issues. He established a non-profit organization called 'Virashtem Otah' which extended aid to needy settlers in the West Bank. Zik claimed that the assassination of Yitzhak Rabin was a conspiracy and broke the story that Avishai Raviv was a member of the Israeli Shin Bet. He based his theory on a list of 58 unanswered questions about the assassination.

== Commemoration ==
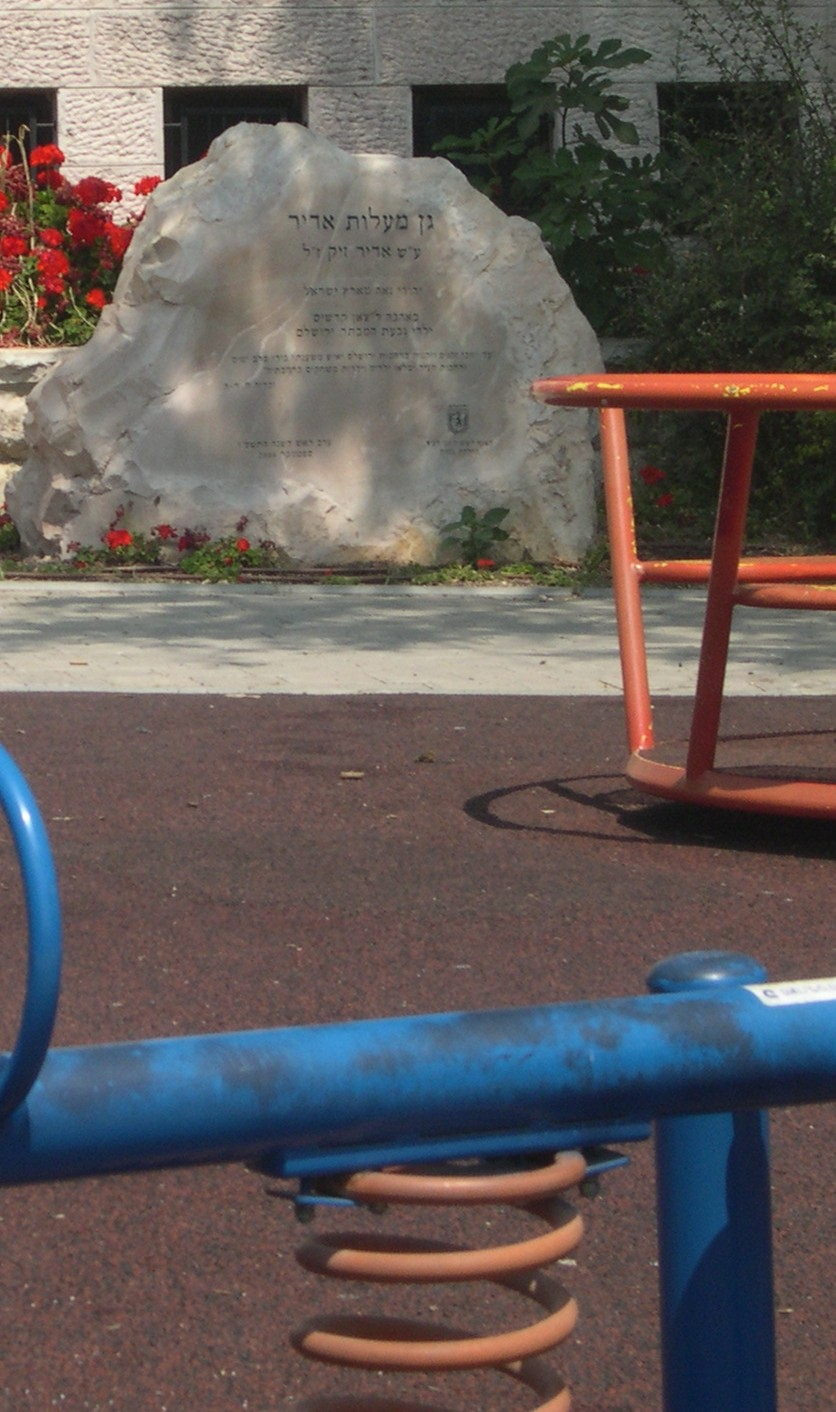
Adir Zik Memorial

In 2009, the Jerusalem Municipality named a street in the Ramat Eshkol neighborhood after him. A park in Givat HaMivtar is named for him.
