= Ichiro Oga =

Japanese botany

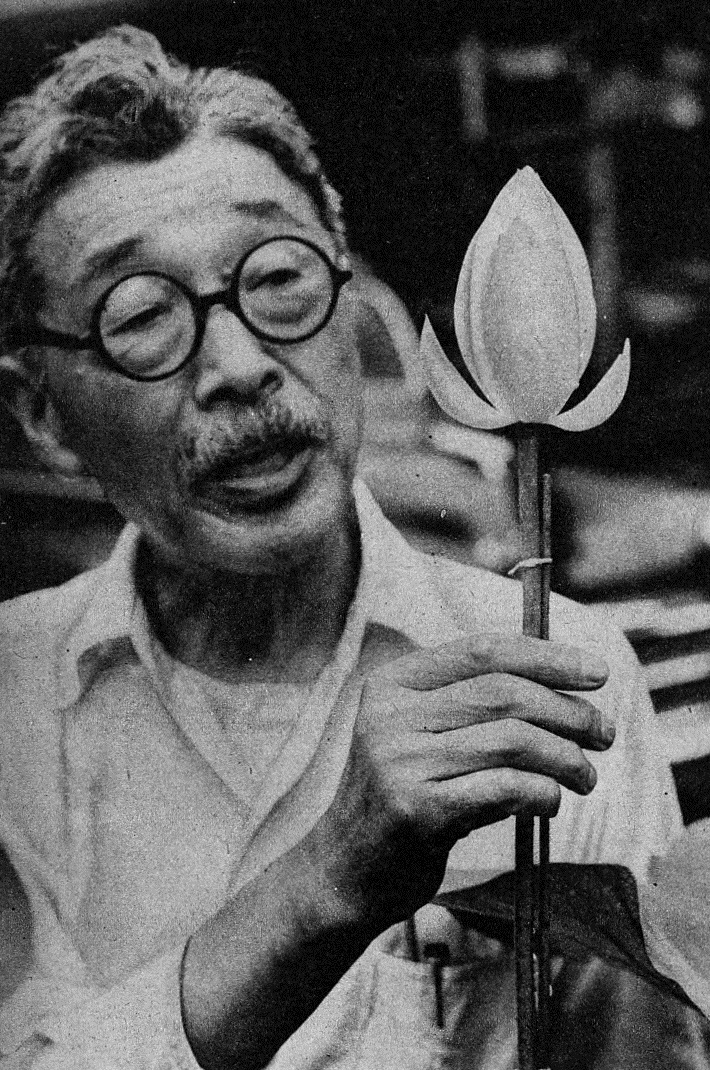
- Ichiro Oga and the Oga lotus
- Born: 1883; Okayama, Japan
- Died: April 28, 1965 (aged 81–82)
- Resting place: Tama Cemetery
- Education: Tokyo Imperial University
- Scientific career
- Fields: Botany
- Workplaces: Kanto Gakuin University; University of Tokyo
- Thesis: A Study of Ancient Lotus Seeds in Pulandian, South Manchuria

Ichiro Oga (大賀一郎 Ōga Ichirō; 1883 – April 28, 1965), also known as Hasu Hakase (Dr. Lotus), was a Japanese paleobotanist famous for his work in discovering and reviving ancient lotus seeds.

== Biography ==
Oga attended Tokyo Imperial University. He graduated from college in 1909 and entered graduate school, majoring in plant cytology. Oga also began studying lotus. After graduation, he became a botanist in the South Manchuria Railway Zone and was a professor at the Education Institute of the South Manchuria Railway Company.

In 1917, Oga heard reports of ancient lotus seeds that had been unearthed by a farmer in Dalian. Deciding to investigate, he traveled to the peat beds of the Paozi Basin, the area where the lotus seeds were discovered. With the help of local farmer Liu Guai, Oga was able to collect over 7,000 specimens. The pair surmised that the lotus ecosystem had collapsed 400 years earlier. Although highly praised by Oga, Guai was executed for his collaboration with the Japanese at the end of Japanese occupation.

In 1923, Oga successfully germinated the collected seeds while attending Johns Hopkins University. He returned to Tokyo University, and earned his Doctorate of Science degree in 1927. He began to distribute seeds to his colleagues, including Ralph Works Chaney, who passed them on to Willard Libby for radiocarbon dating. In 1951, the seeds were tested to be about 1,040 years old. The oldest specimen was dated to be 1,288 years old. However, the wood material found above the seeds were later dated to be over 3,000 years old. This called into question the original dating. The story was published in Life Magazine on November 3, 1952, where the seeds were stated to be over 2,000 years old.
