= Non-church movement =

Japanese Christian denomination (1901-)

The non-church movement (Japanese: 無教会主義, Hepburn: Mukyōkaishugi) is an indigenous Japanese Christian movement which was founded by Uchimura Kanzō in 1901. Many of his disciples have likewise been well-known intellectual figures. In 1979, 35,000 people belonged to the movement in Japan, Taiwan, and Korea.

The complete works of Uchimura Kanzō consist of some 50 volumes, of which 17 are primarily biblical studies, 25 are volumes of theological works, and 8 are volumes of diaries and correspondence.

During the lifetime of Uchimura Kanzō, a graduate of Amherst College, the non-church movement took several organizational forms. His direct disciples were essentially paying members of his private school. As subscribers to his magazine grew, supporters outside Tokyo sought some ongoing relationship with other non-church members. Uchimura organized the Kyōyukai (教友会, or literally, "Meeting of Friends in Faith") in 1905, with 14 branches and 119 members. The purpose of this organization was defined in the following profession of faith:

We who believe in God and His Only Son whom he sent (into the world), uniting together, form the Kyōyukai. With the help of God the Father we shall help our comrades and live lives that are in harmony with His Sovereign Will.

== People of the non-church movement ==
- Tadao Yanaihara
- Masato Koizumi
- Masao Sekine
- Ichiro Ohga

== See also ==
- Japanese new religions
- Dōkai – The Society of the Way
