= Uchimura Kanzō =

Japanese writer (1861–1930)

- 内村 鑑三
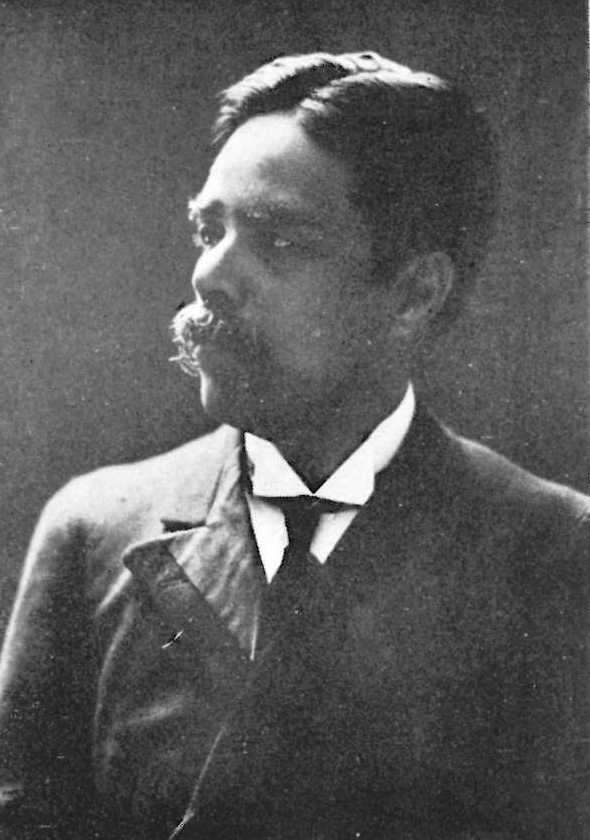
- Uchimura Kanzō in 1918
- Born: 26 March 1861; Edo, Musashi Province, Japan
- Died: 28 March 1930 (aged 69); Toyotama, Yodobashi, Tokyo, Empire of Japan
- Education: Sapporo Agricultural College Amherst College Hartford Theological Seminary
- Occupations: Writer, Christian evangelist
- Known for: Nonchurch Movement
- Children: Uchimura Yushi

Uchimura Kanzō (内村 鑑三; 26 March 1861 – 28 March 1930) was a Japanese author, Christian evangelist, and the founder of the Nonchurch Movement (Mukyōkai) of Christianity during the Meiji and Taishō periods in Japan. He is often considered to be the most well-known Japanese pre–World War II pacifist.

== Early life ==
Uchimura was born in Edo, and exhibited a talent for languages from a very early age; he started to study the English language at the age of 11. At age 13 he entered a foreign language school to continue to study English, and planned to pursue a government job. In 1877, he gained admission to the Sapporo Agricultural College (present-day Hokkaido University), where English was the main language of instruction.

Prior to Uchimura's arrival, William S. Clark, a graduate as well as the president of Amherst College, had spent the year assisting the Japanese government in establishing the college. While his primary role was to teach agricultural technology, Clark was a committed lay Christian missionary who introduced his students to the Christian faith through Bible classes. All of his students converted and signed the "Covenant of Believers in Jesus", committing themselves to continue studying the Bible and to do their best to live moral lives. Clark returned to the United States after one year, but Uchimura felt his influence through the small Covenant group that was left behind. Under considerable pressure from his senpai (先輩, a term for strongly-influential senior peers), Uchimura signed the Covenant during his first year at the College at the age of 16 and went on to receive baptism from a Methodist missionary in 1878.

Dissatisfaction with the mission church, however, led Uchimura and his Japanese supporters to establish an independent church in Sapporo. This experiment turned out to be a precursor to what is now called the Non-church Movement. Through Clark's teaching and example, this small group believed that they could practice and live an authentic life of faith without depending on a religious institution or a professional clergy.

He was a close friend of P. Y. Saeki, an Anglican, but their relationship turned sour later.

== Overseas career ==
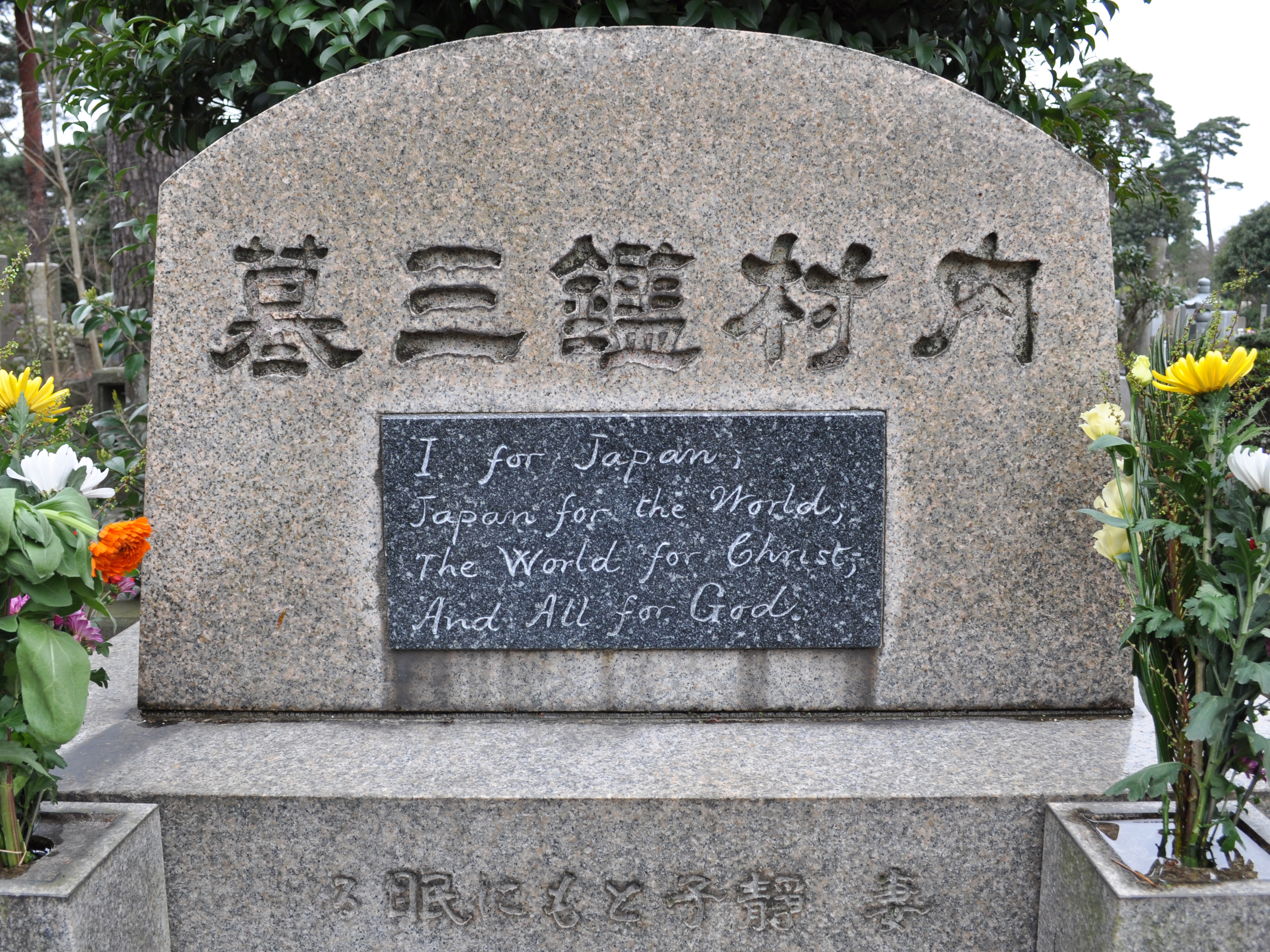
Tombstone of Uchimura Kanzō. It is inscribed "I for Japan, Japan for the World, the World for Christ, and All for God."

Uchimura departed for the United States following a brief and unhappy first marriage in 1884. He was first befriended by Wister Morris and his wife, a Quaker couple, who helped him find employment at Elwyn Institutes as a caregiver shortly after his arrival in Pennsylvania. The Quaker faith and pacifism made a lasting impression upon Uchimura. He and his Sapporo friend Nitobe Inazō were influential in the establishment of the Friends School in Tokyo as a result of his sojourning in the Philadelphia area.

Following eight months of stressful work in Elwyn, Uchimura resigned and traveled through New England, entering Amherst College in September 1885. Julius Hawley Seelye, the president of Amherst College, became his spiritual mentor, and encouraged him to attend the Hartford Theological Seminary. After completing his second bachelor's degree (B.Sc.) in general science at Amherst, he enrolled in Hartford Seminary, but quit after only one semester, disappointed by theological education. He returned to Japan in 1888.

== Japanese religious leader ==
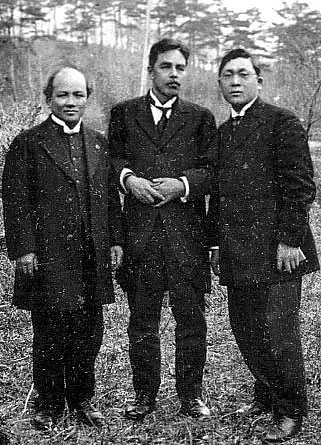
Nakada Juzi, Uchimura Kanzō, Kimura Seimatsu

After his return to Japan, Uchimura worked as a teacher, but was fired or forced to resign in several instances over his uncompromising position toward authorities or foreign missionary bodies that controlled the schools. The most famous such incident was his refusal to bow deeply to the portrait of Emperor Meiji and the Imperial Rescript on Education in the formal ceremony held at the First Higher School (then preparatory division to the Tokyo Imperial University). Realizing that his religious beliefs were incompatible with a teaching career, he turned to writing, becoming senior columnist for the popular newspaper Yorozu Chōhō. Uchimura's fame as a popular writer became solid as he launched a series of sharp criticism against industrialist Ichibei Furukawa over one of modern Japan's first industrial pollution cases involving Furukawa's Ashio Copper Mine.

Uchimura's career as a journalist was cut short as well, largely due to his pacifist views and vocal opposition against the Russo-Japanese War in his newspaper columns, which came into conflict with the paper's official editorial views. He started publishing and selling his own monthly magazine, Tokyo Zasshi (Tokyo Journal) and later Seisho no Kenkyu (Biblical Study), and supported himself by addressing weekly audiences of 500–1000 people in downtown Tokyo in lectures on the Bible. His followers came to share Uchimura's attitude that an organized church was actually a hindrance to the Christian faith, and Christian sacraments, such as baptism and communion, are not essential to salvation. Uchimura named his Christian position "Mukyōkai", or Nonchurch Movement. Uchimura's movement attracted many students in Tokyo who later became influential figures in academia, industry, and literature. His "prophetic" views on religion, science, politics, and social issues became influential beyond his small group of followers.

His writings in English include Japan and the Japanese (1894) and How I Became a Christian (1895), and reflect his struggle to develop a Japanese form of Christianity. In his lifetime, Uchimura became famous overseas. His major English-language works were translated into numerous languages. After his death, however, Uchimura's reputation grew more, as his followers produced an enormous amount of literature.

== Works ==
- Uchimura, Kanzo (1894), Japan and the Japanese: Essays, Tokyo: Min'yūsha
  - Uchimura, Kanzo (2005) [1894], Japan and the Japanese: Essays (Paperback ed.), Adamant Media Corporation, ISBN 0-543-85116-8.
  - Uchimura, Kanzo (2011) [1894], Japan and the Japanese. Essays (Historical Print ed.), British Library, ISBN 978-1-241-18626-5.
- Uchimura, Kanzo (1895), How I Became a Christian: Out of My Diary, by a "Heathen Convert", Tokyo: Keiseisha.
  - Uchimura, Kanzo (2009) [1895], How I Became a Christian: Out of My Diary (Paperback ed.), Cornell University Library, ISBN 978-1-4297-7881-7.
- Uchimura, Kanzo (2009), The Diary of a Japanese Convert (Paperback ed.), United Kingdom: Dodo Press, ISBN 978-1-4099-6172-7.
  - Uchimura, Kanzo (2011), The Diary of a Japanese Convert, with a Foreword by T. S. Wentworth (Paperback ed.), Primary Sources, Historical Collections, ISBN 978-1-241-07858-4.
  - Uchimura, Kanzo (2012), The Diary of a Japanese Convert (Paperback ed.), Ulan Press, ASIN B009UCKH52.
- Uchimura, Kanzo (1908), Representative Men of Japan: Essays, Tokyo: Keiseisha.
  - Uchimura, Kanzo (2002) [1908], Representative Men of Japan: Essays (Paperback ed.), Kodansha, ISBN 978-4-7700-2928-7 Japanese/English; new English translation: Kazuo Inamori.
  - Uchimura, Kanzo (2011) [1908], Representative Men of Japan; Essays (Paperback ed.), Nabu Press, ISBN 978-1-246-88464-7.
  - Uchimura, Kanzo (2012) [1908], Representative Men of Japan: Essays, Classic Reprint (Paperback ed.), Forgotten Books, ASIN B008XBO7XY.
  - Uchimura, Kanzo (2012) [1908], Representative Men of Japan; Essays (Paperback ed.), Ulan Press, ASIN B00AWGT7U6.
