= 7th New York Veteran Infantry Regiment =

Union Army infantry regiment during the American Civil War

- Active: March 29, 1864 - August 4, 1865
- Country: United States
- Allegiance: Union
- Branch: Infantry
- Equipment: Springfield Model 1861, Springfield Model 1842 (Smooth-bored)
- Engagements: American Civil War: Siege of Petersburg; First and Second Battles of Deep Bottom; Battle of the Crater; Battle of Strawberry Plains; Second Battle of Ream's Station; Battle of Hatcher's Run; Third Battle of Petersburg; Battle of Sailor's Creek; Battle of Appomattox Court House

Commanders
- Regimental Commander: Colonel George W. Von Schack

The 7th New York Veteran Infantry Regiment was an infantry regiment in the Union Army during the American Civil War. The regiment was active in the Eastern Theater.

== Service ==
The 7th New York Veteran Infantry was organized at Hart Island (Bronx) and was mustered in by companies from March 29 to October 31, 1864, under the command of Colonel George W. Von Schack. The regiment included some men from the 7th New York Volunteer Infantry Regiment.

The some companies of the regiment were attached to the 52nd New York Volunteer Infantry until July 22, 1864, and upon completing recruitment it was assigned to the 1st Division, 2d Corps, Army of the Potomac, serving in both the 3rd Brigade and the Consolidated Brigade.

== Detailed service ==
The 7th New York Veteran Infantry Regiment served from the Siege of Petersburg, Virginia, starting on July 22, 1864, until April 2, 1865. They were involved in various engagements and operations, including a demonstration north of the James River in July 1864, the Mine Explosion at Petersburg in July 1864, and actions at Deep Bottom in August 1864. The regiment also participated in reconnaissance to Hatcher's Run in December 1864, engagements at Dabney's Mills and Hatcher's Run in February 1865, and the Watkins House skirmish in March 1865. They were present at the surrender of Robert E. Lee and his army at the Appomattox Court House in April 1865. Afterward, they marched to Washington, D.C., in May, took part in the Grand Review on May 23, and were later stationed at Hart's Island, N.Y., until their muster out on August 4, 1865.

== Casualties ==
During their service, the regiment lost 3 officers and 52 enlisted men who were killed or mortally wounded, and 73 enlisted men to disease, totaling 128 casualties.

== See also ==
- List of New York Civil War regiments
- New York in the Civil War
