= 10th New York Infantry Regiment =

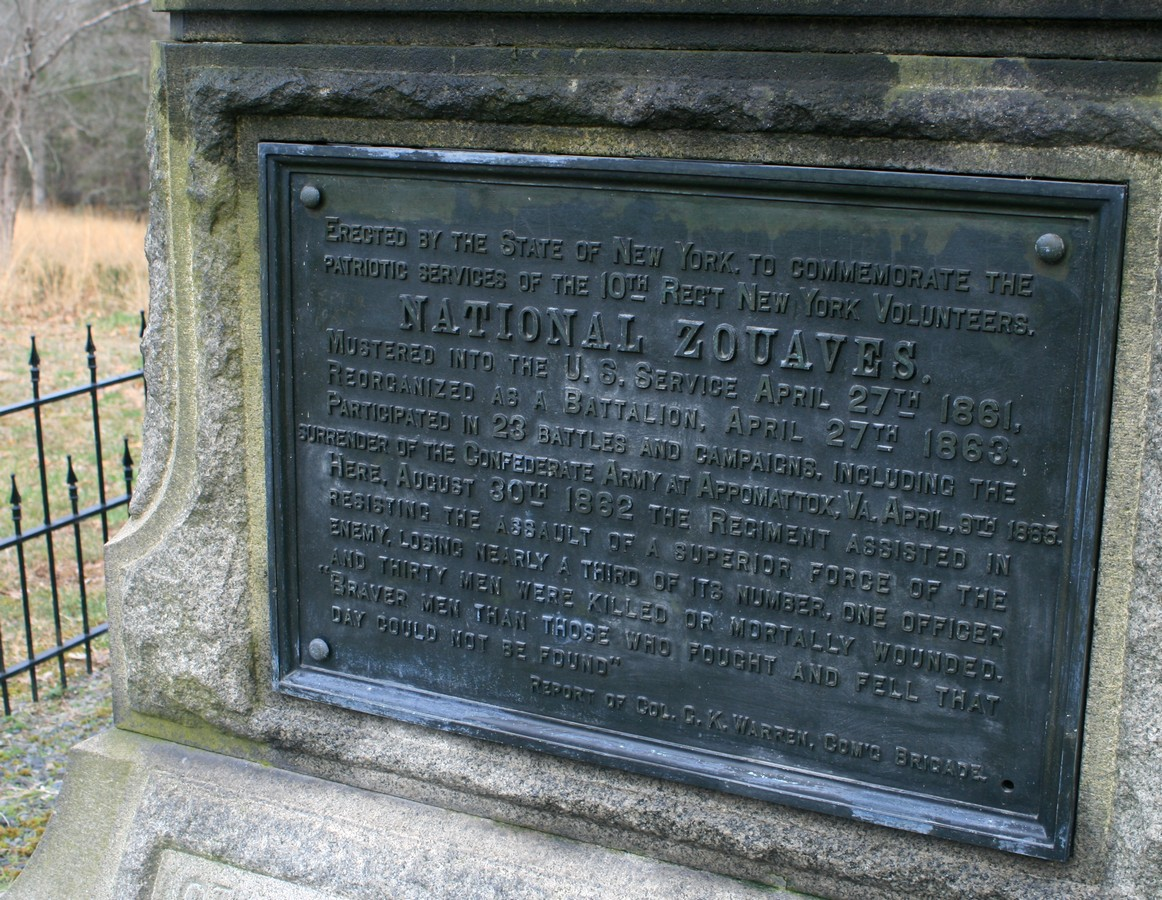
- Manassas battlefield, monument of 10th New York regiment (National zouaves)
- Active: November 23, 1861 to June 30, 1865
- Country: United States of America
- Allegiance: Union
- Branch: Infantry
- Size: 713, (Note: As reported back to Adjutant General Hillhouse upon departure from New York on June 27, 1861)722 (Note: As reported back to Adjutant General Hillhouse, on December 31, 1862), 710 (Note: As reported back to Adjutant General Sprague, on December 31, 1863)
- Nickname(s): National Zouaves
- Equipment: Model 1842 Springfield Muskets (.69 caliber, smoothbore and rifled) (Note: On 18 Sep 1861, 722 Harper's Ferry rifled Model 1842s, percussion locks from manufacture and rifled. As reported back to Adjutant General on December 31, 1863. This was the number turned in when issued Springfields.), 1861, Model 1861 Springfield Rifles
- Engagements: Battle of Tranter's Creek; Seven Days Battles; Battle of Gaines' Mill; Battle of Malvern Hill; Second Battle of Bull Run; Battle of Antietam; Battle of Shepherdstown; Battle of Fredericksburg; Battle of Chancellorsville; Battle of Gettysburg; Battle of Auburn II; Battle of Bristoe Station; Battle of Mine Run; Battle of Morton's Ford; Battle of Spotsylvania Court House; Battle of North Anna; Battle of Cold Harbor; Second Battle of Petersburg; Battle of Jerusalem Plank Road; First Battle of Deep Bottom; Second Battle of Ream's Station; Battle of Boydton Plank Road; Battle of Hatcher's Run; Appomattox Campaign; Battle of White Oak Road; Battle of Petersburg III; Battle of High Bridge; Battle of Appomattox Courthouse

Insignia
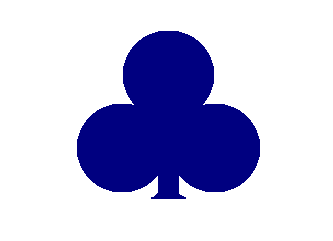
- 3rd Division, II Corps

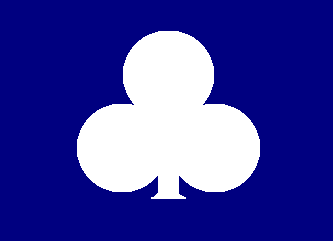
- 2nd Division, II Corps

The 10th New York Infantry Regiment was an infantry regiment that served in the Union Army during the American Civil War. It was also known as the McChesney Zouaves or National Guard Zouaves.

== Service ==
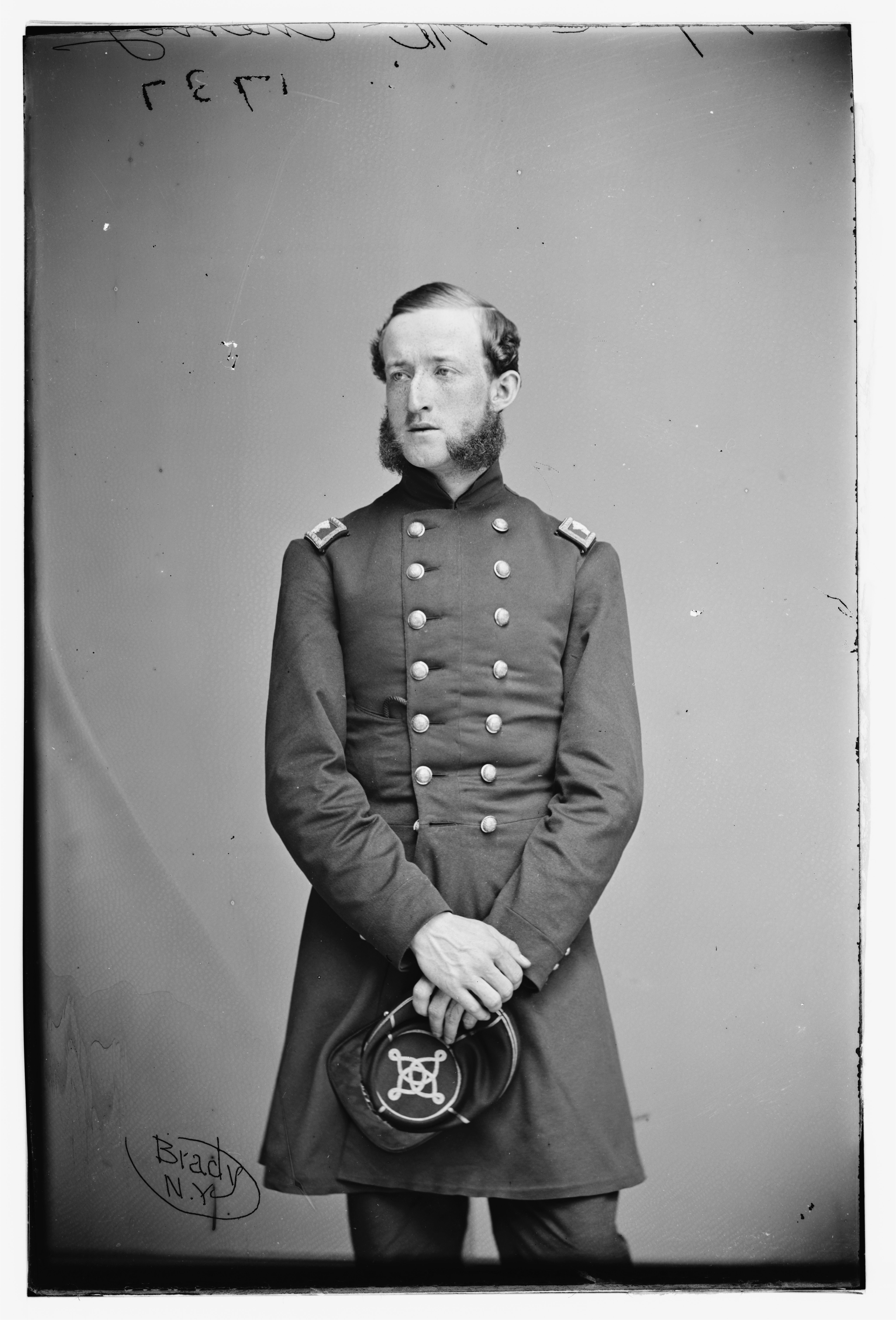
Col. W. W. McChesney, 10th N.Y. Inf.

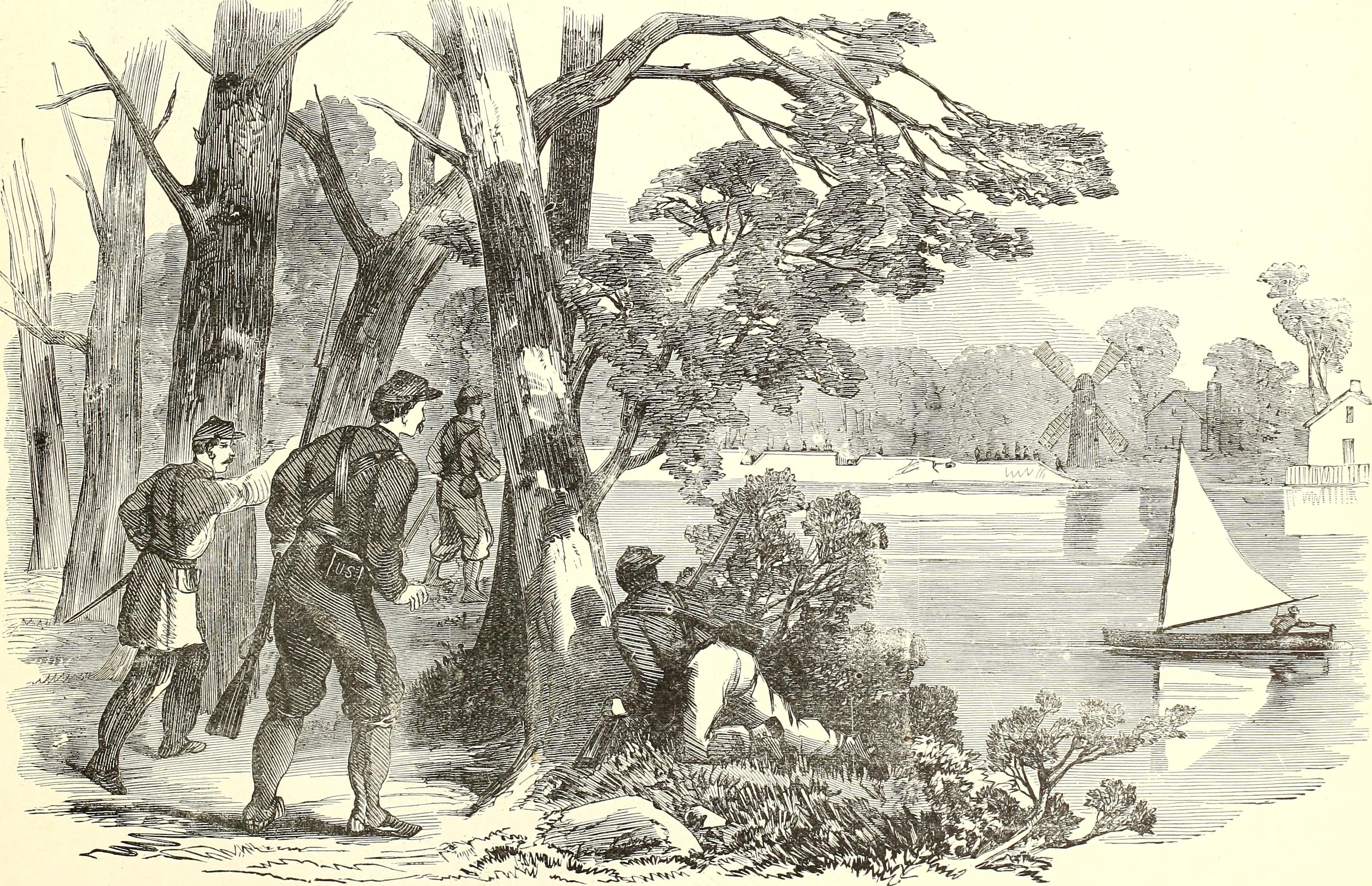
Discovery of a new rebel battery at Messech's Point, near the mouth of Back River by a scouting party of the Tenth Regiment of New York Zouaves, before September 1861

The 10th New York Volunteer Infantry, the National Zouaves or McChesney's Zouaves, was recruited in New York city and Brooklyn and mustered into federal service, April 27, 30, May 2, and 7, 1861, for a two-year enlistment. From Sandy Hook, where it was encamped, the regiment embarked for Fortress Monroe on June 5, and was ordered to join the reserve during the battle of Big Bethel.

Headquarters were established at Camp Hamilton, near Fortress Monroe, and here the regiment was stationed until the opening of the campaign on the Peninsula the following year. In May 1862, the regiment moved to Norfolk and Portsmouth and on June 7, was attached to the 3d brigade, 2nd division, V Corps, which it joined at Bottom's bridge on the Chickahominy. It was active in the Seven Days' battles, encamped at Harrison's Landing until late in August, when it returned to Newport News, whence it was ordered to Manassas and fought bravely in the Second Bull Run, losing 115 men in killed, wounded and missing.

At South Mountain and Antietam, it was held in reserve; was in action at Shepherdstown, after which it was assigned to the 3d brigade, 3d division, II Corps, with which it fought at Fredericksburg, where almost one-half of the members of the regiment who went into action were killed, wounded or missing.

A portion of the winter was spent in the performance of guard duty at headquarters and the original two years members not reenlisted were mustered out at New York on May 7, 1863. The remainder of the regiment was consolidated into a battalion of four companies to which were later added two companies of new recruits and the veterans of the 8th N. Y. artillery. The battalion was made provost guard of the 3d division, II Corps and in March, 1864, was attached to the 3d brigade, 2nd division, II Corps. It was active at the Wilderness, where the loss was 95 members, at Spottsylvania, Laurel Hill, the North Anna river, Totopotomy, and Cold Harbor.

It then served during the long siege of Petersburg, being engaged in the early assaults on the works there, at the Weldon Railroad, Deep Bottom, Strawberry Plains, Reams' Station, the Boydton Plank Road, Hatcher's Run, White Oak Road, and in the final assault on the fortifications, April 2, 1865. In the pursuit which followed the evacuation, the 10th was in line with its brigade and performed guard duty near Richmond until the welcome orders to return home. The regiment was mustered out at Munson's Hill, VA., June 30, 1865.

== Affiliations, battle honors, detailed service, and casualties ==
=== Organizational affiliation ===
Attached to:

- Fortress Monroe and Camp Hamilton, Department of Virginia, to June, 1862
- 3rd Brigade 2nd Division, V Corps, Army of the Potomac (AoP) to September, 1862
- 3rd Brigade, 3rd Division, II Corps, to May, 1863
- 2nd Brigade, 3rd Division, II Corps, to March, 1864
- 3rd Brigade, 2nd Division, II Corps, to June, 1865

=== List of battles ===
The official list of battles in which the regiment bore a part:

- Battle of Tranter's Creek
- Seven Days Battles
- Battle of Gaines' Mill
- Battle of Malvern Hill
- Second Battle of Bull Run
- Battle of Antietam
- Battle of Shepherdstown
- Battle of Fredericksburg
- Battle of Chancellorsville
- Battle of Gettysburg
- Battle of Auburn II
- Battle of Bristoe Station
- Battle of Mine Run
- Battle of Morton's Ford
- Battle of Spotsylvania Court House
- Battle of North Anna
- Battle of Cold Harbor
- Second Battle of Petersburg
- Battle of Jerusalem Plank Road
- First Battle of Deep Bottom
- Second Battle of Ream's Station
- Battle of Boydton Plank Road
- Battle of Hatcher's Run
- Appomattox Campaign
- Battle of White Oak Road
- Battle of Petersburg III
- Battle of High Bridge
- Battle of Appomattox Courthouse

=== Detailed service ===
Detailed service is as follows:

==== 1861 ====
- Left State for Fortress Monroe, June 6, 1861
- Duty at Camp Hamilton, Va., till May, 1862

==== 1862 ====
- Occupation of Norfolk and Portsmouth May 10 and duty there till June 7
- Joined Army of the Potomac on the Peninsula
- Operations against Stuart June 13–15
- Old Church June 13
- Seven days before Richmond June 25-July 1
- Gaines Mill June 27
- White Oak Swamp and Turkey Bend June 30
- Malvern Hill July 1
- At Harrison's Landing till August 16
- Movement to Fortress Monroe, thence to Centreville August 16–28
- Battle of Second Bull Run August 30
- Battle of Antietam September 16–17
- Shepherdstown Ford and Shepherdstown September 19–20
- Movement to Falmouth October 29-November 19
- Provost guard for Sumner's Grand Division December 7–24
- Battle of Fredericksburg December 12–15

=== 1863 ===
- Burnside's 2nd Campaign, "Mud March," January 20–24, 1863
- At Falmouth till April 27
- Chancellorsville Campaign April 27-May 6
- Provost Guard, 3rd Division, II Corps, April 27 to June 14
- Battle of Chancellorsville May 1–5
- Battle of Gettysburg, Pa., July 2–4
- Advance from the Rappahannock to the Rapidan September 13–17
- Bristoe Campaign October 9–22
- Auburn and Bristoe October 14
- Blackburn's Ford October 15
- Advance to line of the Rappahannock November 7–8
- Mine Run Campaign November 26-December 2

=== 1864 ===
- Demonstration on the Rapidan February 6–7, 1864
- Morton's Ford February 6–7
- Campaign from the Rapidan to the James May 3-June 15
- Battles of the Wilderness May 5–7
- Spottsylvania May 8–12
- Laurel Hill May 8
- Po River May 10
- Spottsylvania Court House May 12–21
- Assault on the Salient, "Bloody Angle," May 12
- North Anna River May 23–26
- On line of the Pamunkey May 26–28
- Totopotomoy May 28–31
- Cold Harbor June 1–12
- Before Petersburg June 16–18
- Siege of Petersburg June 16, 1864, to April 2, 1865
- Jerusalem Plank Road June 22–23, 1864
- Demonstration north of the James July 27–29
- Deep Bottom July 27–28
- Mine Explosion July 30 (Reserve)
- Demonstration north of the James August 13–20
- Strawberry Plains, Deep Bottom, August 14–18
- Ream's Station August 25
- Boydton Plank Road, Hatcher's Run October 27–28

=== 1865 ===
- Dabney's Mills, Hatcher's Run, February 5–7
- Watkins' House March 25
- Appomattox Campaign March 28-April 9
- Crow's House March 31
- Fall of Petersburg April 2
- Sailor's Creek April 6
- High Bridge, Farmville, April 7
- Appomattox Court House April 9
- Surrender of Lee and his army
- At Burkesville till May 2
- March to Washington, D. C, May 2–12
- Grand Review May 23
- Mustered out June 30, 1865

=== Casualties ===
During its term of service, it lost 130 by death from wounds and 89 by death from accident, imprisonment or disease.

== Armament & uniforms ==
=== Armament ===
Soldiers in the 10th were armed with 713 National Armory (NA) (Note: In government records, National Armory refers to one of three United States Armory and Arsenals, the Springfield Armory, the Harpers Ferry Armory, and the Rock Island Arsenal. Rifle-muskets, muskets, and rifles were manufactured in Springfield and Harper's Ferry before the war. When the Rebels destroyed the Harpers Ferry Armory early in the American Civil War and stole the machinery for the Confederate central government-run Richmond Armory, the Springfield Armory was briefly the only government manufacturer of arms, until the Rock Island Arsenal was established in 1862. During this time production ramped up to unprecedented levels ever seen in American manufacturing up until that time, with only 9,601 rifles manufactured in 1860, rising to a peak of 276,200 by 1864. These advancements would not only give the Union a decisive technological advantage over the Confederacy during the war but served as a precursor to the mass production manufacturing that contributed to the post-war Second Industrial Revolution and 20th century machine manufacturing capabilities. American historian Merritt Roe Smith has drawn comparisons between the early assembly machining of the Springfield rifles and the later production of the Ford Model T, with the latter having considerably more parts, but producing a similar numbers of units in the earliest years of the 1913–1915 automobile assembly line, indirectly due to mass production manufacturing advancements pioneered by the armory 50 years earlier.) and contract manufactured Model 1842 Springfield Muskets smoothbore muskets drawn from state arsenals. (Note: The smoothbore version was produced without sights (except for a cast one on the barrel band). Using a Buck and Ball cartridge, the smoothbore version of the 1842 musket was very effective during the American Civil War.) At some point in the fall of 1861, the regiment, like others in its division, exchanged the smoothbore muskets for newer Model 1861 Springfield rifled muskets at the Washington DC arsenal. By the end of the first full year of hard campaigning, the regimented returned 722 Model 1842 smoothbore percussion muskets to the Adjutant General. By theFredericksburg, the regiment reported the following survey result to U.S. War Department:

- A — 11 Springfield Rifled Muskets, model 1855, 1861, NA and contract, (.58 Cal.)
- B — 46 Springfield Rifled Muskets, model 1855, 1861, NA and contract, (.58 Cal.)
- C — 36 Springfield Rifled Muskets, model 1855, 1861, NA and contract, (.58 Cal.)
- D — 38 Springfield Rifled Muskets, model 1855, 1861, NA and contract, (.58 Cal.)
- E — 44 Springfield Rifled Muskets, model 1855, 1861, NA and contract, (.58 Cal.)
- F — 59 Springfield Rifled Muskets, model 1855, 1861, NA and contract, (.58 Cal.)
- G — 78 Springfield Rifled Muskets, model 1855, 1861, NA and contract, (.58 Cal.)
- H — 18 Springfield Rifled Muskets, model 1855, 1861, NA and contract, (.58 Cal.); 18 Model 1841 Mississippi rifles, NA and contract, (.54 Cal.)
- I — 37 Springfield Rifled Muskets, model 1855, 1861, NA and contract, (.58 Cal.)
- K — 33 Springfield Rifled Muskets, model 1855, 1861, NA and contract, (.58 Cal.)

=== Shoulder Arms Gallery ===
Issued weapons

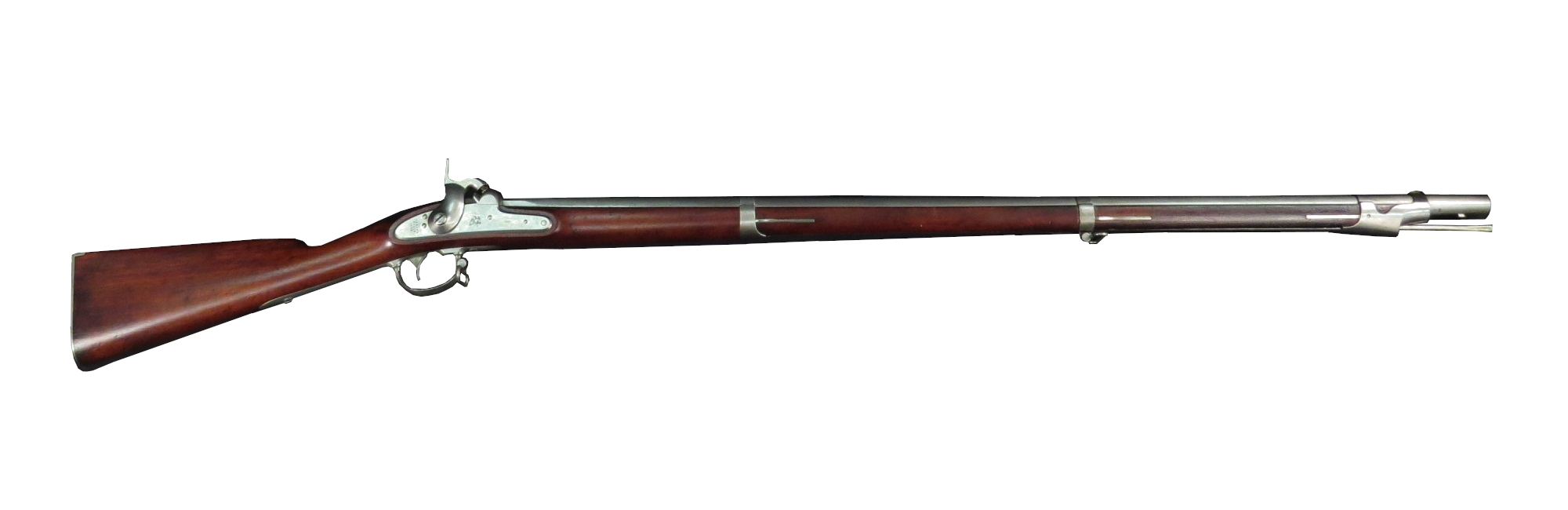
Model 1842 smoothbore musket

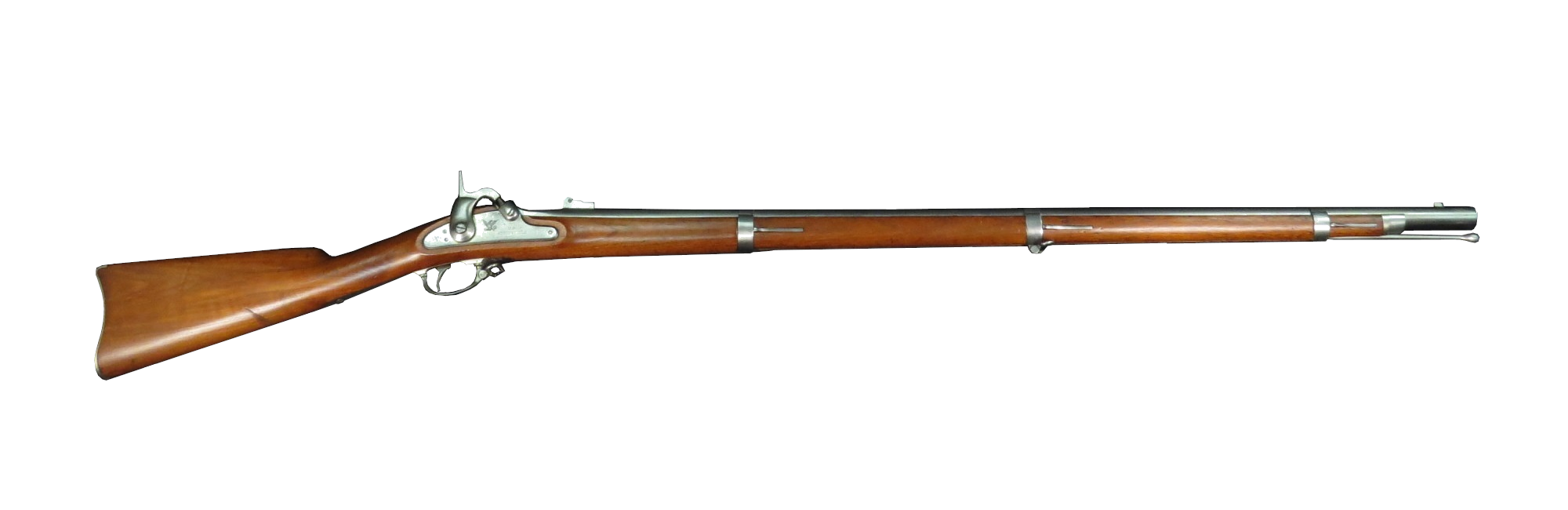
Springfield Model 1861

=== Uniform ===
The 10th New York wore a dark blue bound Zouave jacket trimmed in red with a red trefoil both sides of the front, and cuffs pointed/piped in red. A collar-less short-sleeved red vest piped in yellow was worn under the jacket, which was only fastened at the neck, with six brass buttons. The men wore a blue-tasseled red faz covered with a white turban. Instead of baggy Zouave trousers, narrower sky blue trousers with double red stripes on the outseam. Around the waist a royal sash trimmed in red was worn. The trousers were tucked into white canvas leggings. (Note: After time in the field, the jacket would fade to a brown shade.)

== Commanders ==
- Colonel Walter W. McChesney
- Colonel John E. Bendix
- Colonel Joseph Yeamans
- Colonel George F. Hopper

== See also ==
- List of New York Civil War regiments
