= Jacob Dietrick =

American businessman and Civil War veteran

Jacob Dietrich
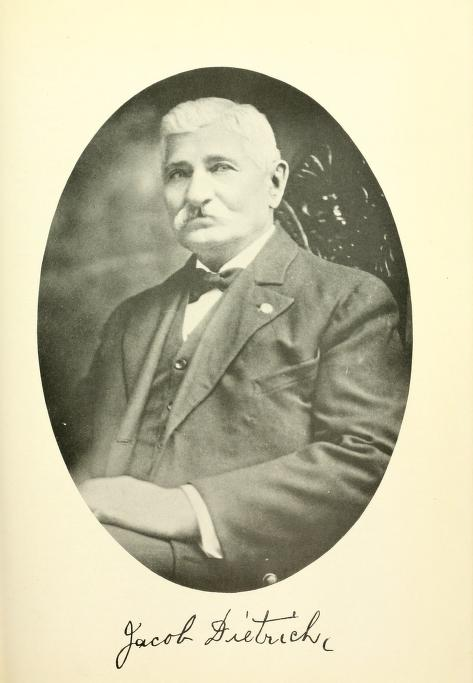
- Dietrich in 1922
- Born: January 14, 1845; Philadelphia, Pennsylvania, U.S.
- Died: March 26, 1926 (aged 81); East Orange, New Jersey, U.S.
- Occupation: Businessman
- Known for: Founder of a moving and storage business in East Orange, New Jersey
- Spouses: Emma Miller (m. 1866; died 1922); Elizabeth Cougar (m. 1924)
- Children: 8

Jacob Dietrich (January 14, 1845 – March 26, 1926) was an American businessman and Civil War veteran who founded a successful dray, express, and storage warehouse business in East Orange, New Jersey. Beginning with a single wagon in 1882, he built one of the region’s leading moving and storage companies, known for its specialized piano-moving equipment and large storage facilities.

== Early life ==
Jacob Dietrich was born in Philadelphia, Pennsylvania, on January 14, 1845, to Ignatz and Elizabeth (Hockhalter) Dietrich, both of whom were immigrants from Germany. He spent much of his early life on a farm in New York State, later residing in New York City and various parts of New Jersey. Before establishing his own business, Dietrich worked in a variety of trades depending on the locality and season, gaining a reputation as industrious and thrifty.

== Military service ==
=== Civil War ===
Dietrich enlisted in the Union Army in New York City on August 25, 1863, serving as a private in Captain George Degener’s Company L of the 52nd New York Volunteer Infantry Regiment, later transferring to Company E. The regiment, also known as the “Siegel Rifles,” was primarily composed of German-American recruits and fought with the Army of the Potomac.

He took part in numerous engagements, including: White Oak Swamp, Glendale, Malvern Hill, Bristoe Station, Mine Run, Robertson's Tavern, Wilderness, Spotsylvania (Po River, Bloody Angle), North Anna, Totopotomoy, Cold Harbor, the siege and assault of Petersburg, Weldon Railroad, Deep Bottom, Strawberry Plains, Ream’s Station, Hatcher’s Run, the fall of Petersburg, Deatonsville Road, and Appomattox.

On April 8, 1865, Dietrich was accidentally injured when struck by an ax wielded by a fellow soldier. He was sent to Augur General Hospital in Washington, D.C., where he remained until the close of the war. He was honorably discharged on June 19, 1865.

=== Regular Army ===
On February 1, 1868, Dietrich enlisted in the United States Army at West Point, New York, serving as an artificer in Company B of the Battalion of Engineers under Captain W. H. King. He was honorably discharged at Washington, D.C., on February 1, 1871.

== Business career ==
In 1882, Dietrich established a dray and express service in East Orange, New Jersey. Beginning in a modest way, he gradually expanded his operations to include:

- Local express delivery of trunks and baggage
- Long-distance motor truck service
- Piano-moving with specialized equipment
- Full moving van operations
- A storage warehouse located at 47 North Grove Street, East Orange

Over the course of 35 years, Dietrich’s company became larger and better-equipped, employing a steady workforce and offering what contemporary accounts described as modern, efficient service.

== Personal life ==
On November 23, 1866, Dietrich married Emma Miller, daughter of John Miller, at Highland Falls, New York. They had seven children: Emma, Margaret, George, Anna (married William Corby), William, Chester (married Harriet Thatcher), and Lillian (married Charles C. Colbran).

Dietrich was a member of Uzal Dodd Post No. 12 of the Grand Army of the Republic, a Republican in politics, and a member of the First Baptist Church of East Orange.

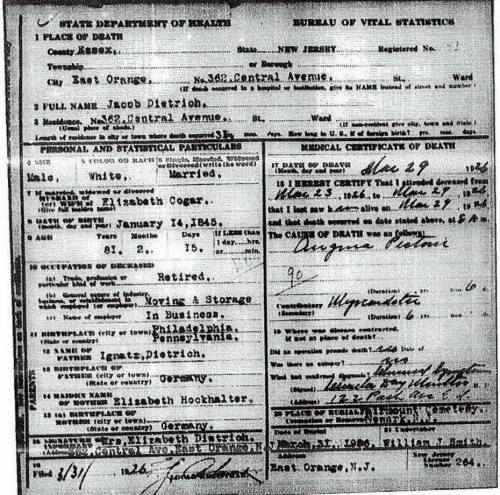
Jacob Dietrich Death Certificate

== Death and legacy ==
Dietrich died on March 26, 1926, in East Orange, New Jersey. He is remembered both for his Civil War service and for establishing one of the earliest large-scale moving and storage companies in East Orange, New Jersey, which contributed to the area’s economic growth in the late 19th and early 20th centuries. He was buried in Fairmount Cemetery (Newark, New Jersey) with his wife Emma.
