= 7th New York Infantry Regiment =

- Reconstruction of the National flag of the regiment
- Active: April 23, 1861 – May 8, 1863; March 29, 1864 – August 4, 1865
- Country: United States
- Allegiance: Union
- Branch: Infantry
- Size: 700, (Note: As reported back to Adjutant General Hillhouse upon departure from New York on June 27, 1861) 800 (Note: As reported back to Adjutant General Hillhouse, on December 31, 1862), 783
- Nicknames: Steuben Guard; Steuben Regiment
- Equipment: 800 Model 1842 Springfield Muskets (.69 caliber, smoothbore), (Note: Exchanged fall 1861 for 720 Model 1841 Mississippi rifles contract manufactured by Remington with triangular bayonet.); Pattern 1856 Percussion Short Rifle, model 1855, 1861 (Note: As seen in surveys before Fredericksburg.)
- Engagements: Battle of Big Bethel; Skirmish at Cedar Lane; Siege of Yorktown; Battle of Williamsburg; Battle of Fair Oaks; Seven Days Battles; Battle of Oak Grove; Battle of White Oak Swamp; Battle of Glendale; Battle of Malvern Hill; Battle of Antietam; Battle of Fredericksburg; Battle of Chancellorsville; Battle of the Wilderness; Battle of Spotsylvania Court House; Battle of North Anna; Battle of Totopotomoy Creek; Battle of Cold Harbor; First Battle of Petersburg; Second Battle of Petersburg; Battle of Weldon Railroad; First Battle of Deep Bottom; Second Battle of Deep Bottom; Second Battle of Ream's Station; Battle of Boydton Plank Road; Battle of Hatcher's Run; Battle of White Oak Road; Battle of Sailor's Creek; Battle of High Bridge; Battle of Appomattox Court House

Insignia
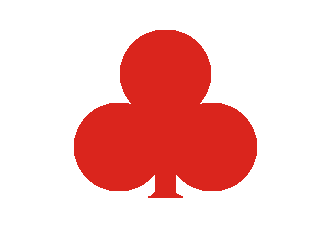
- 1st Division, II Corps

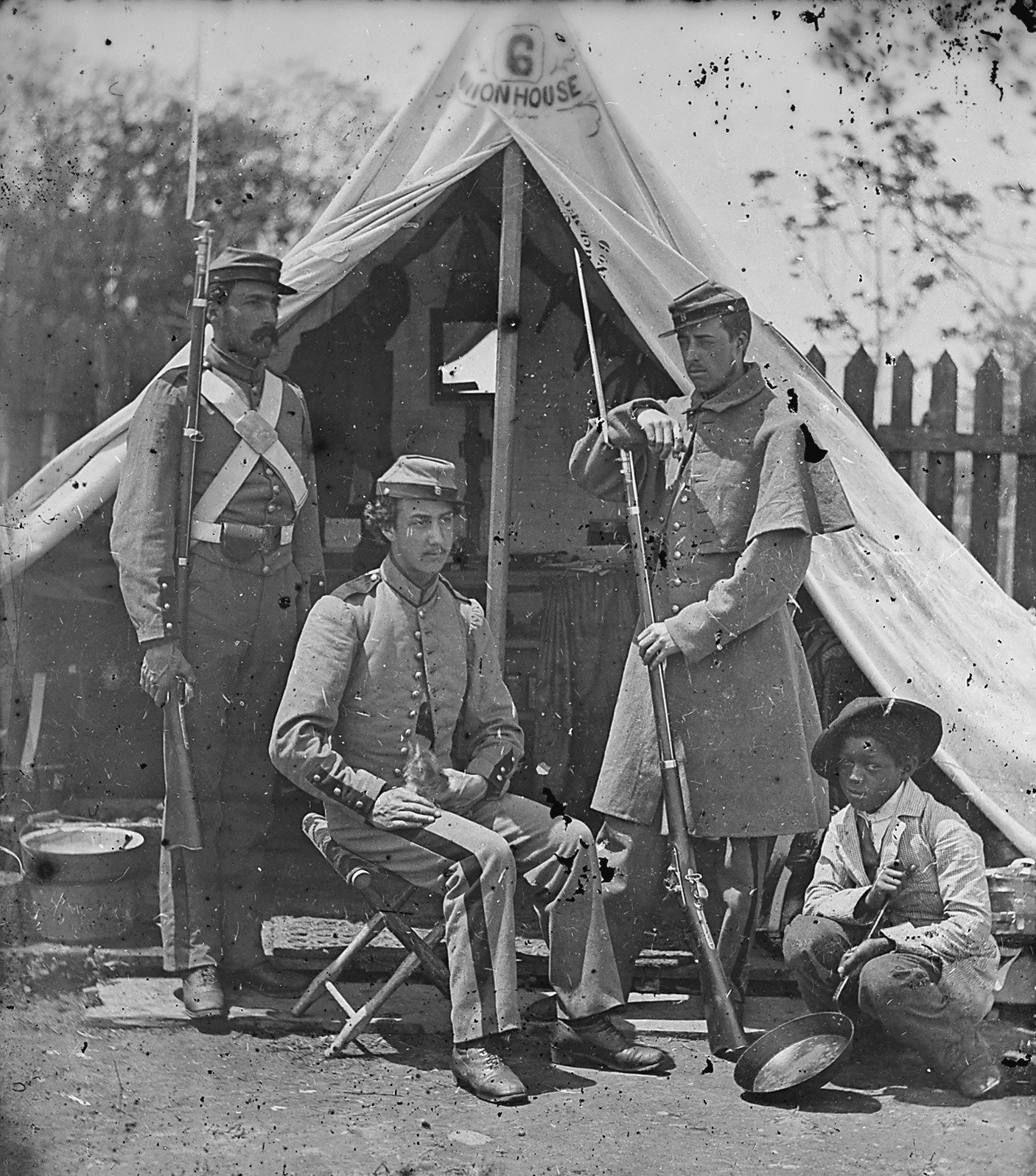
Group of 7th N.Y. Infantry

The 7th New York Infantry Regiment, later reorganized at the 7th Veteran Infantry Regiment, was an infantry regiment that served in the Union Army during the American Civil War. It was composed almost entirely of German immigrants and is also known as the Steuben Guard or the Steuben Regiment. It should not be confused with the 7th New York Militia, an entirely different regiment whose service overlapped with the 7th New York Volunteers.

== Service ==
=== 1861 ===
The regiment was organized in New York City and was mustered in for a two-year enlistment on April 23, 1861. It was nicknamed "The Steuben Rangers". Early in its training, it was so poorly equipped that a civilian who visited the troops wrote a letter to the editor of The New York Times (published May 16, 1861) complaining that tailors within the regiment had to resew the uniforms and put buttons on them, and that some of the soldiers were wearing "flip-flaps". The letter-writer was impressed (spelling and punctuation as in the original):

I have seen no troops before, and I have seen none since, in which there was the same indescribable aspect of discipline. The men were not in uniform, but very poorly dressed, — in many cases with flip-flap shoes. The business-like air with which they marched rapidly through the deep mud of the Third-avenue was the more remarkable.

With "one or two exceptions" almost every officer then in the regiment had experience in European armies, and six out of eight of the soldiers had seen service, often in battle. "The only arms they have as yet are a few old muskets bought by the officers themselves."

The regiment, commanded by Colonel John E. Bendix, was accepted by the State, April 26, 1861; organized at New York city, and there mustered in, the service of the United States for two years, on April 23, 1861. Company I was recruited at Brooklyn, the others in New York City.

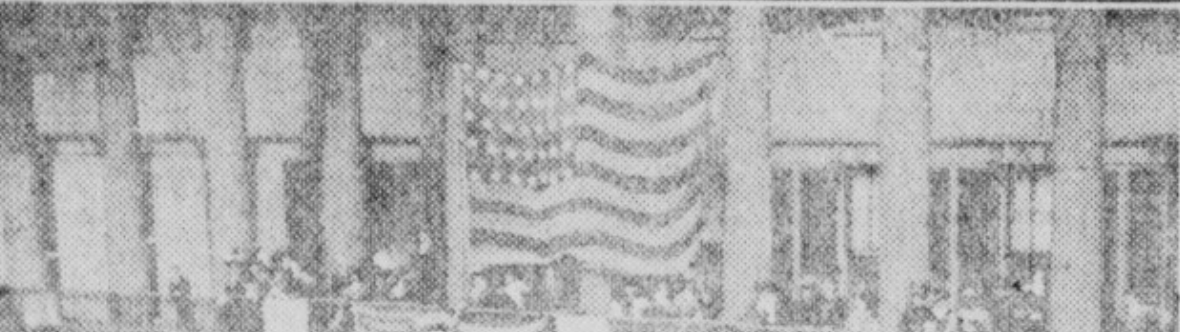
Flag hung at 432 Lafayette street to celebrate their departure for the south, photographed in 1911

=== 1862 ===
It left New York for Fortress Monroe on May 24, and was quartered at Newport News. It took part in the engagement at Big Bethel and returned to camp at Newport News until in March, 1862, when it was assigned to the 1st Brigade, 1st Division, Army of Virginia. It then served in the 1st Brigade, 1st Division, II Corps, Army of the Potomac, from May 1862, with which it served through the campaign on the Peninsula, taking part in the Seven Days battles with heavy loss. At Antietam it lost 15 killed and 49 wounded, but its heaviest loss was at Fredericksburg, when 243 members were killed or wounded out of a total of 488 engaged.

=== 1863 ===
On April 25, 1863, the original two years' members were mustered out at New York City and the three years men were transferred to the 52nd New York Infantry Regiment but not absorbed by them until after the battle of Gettysburg in July, 1863. The 7th was active in the Chancellorsville campaign and at Gettysburg, after which the remnant of the 52nd and the 7th was consolidated with the 7th New York Veteran Infantry. On July 22, 1864, the few remaining men were then transferred to the 7th New York Veteran Volunteers.

Commanded by Colonel George W. Von Schack at the completion of its service, the regiment was honorably discharged and mustered out, May 8, 1863, at New York City.

On May 6, 1863, Colonel Von Schack received authority to reorganize, for a period of three years, the 7th New York, then about to be mustered out by reason of the expiration of its term of service.

To effect the reorganization the following were appointed by the Governor, May 6, 1863, but not commissioned:

- George W. Von Schack - Colonel
- Frederick A. H. Gaebel - Lieutenant Colonel
- Charles Brestel - Major
- Peter Hesse - Adjutant
- F. C. G. Moyne - Quartermaster
- Charles Gray - Surgeon

These appointments became void on the discontinuance of the reorganization on October 14, 1863, when the men enlisted were transferred to the 178th New York Infantry.

=== 1864 ===
In spring, 1864, Col. George W. Von Schack, under his former authority, again commenced the formation of a regiment, under the above title, and the organization took place at Hart's island. New York harbor. The companies were mustered in the United States service for three years; A, B, C, D and E March 29, May 1, June 4, July 15, and August 9, 1864, respectively; for one, two and three years. Company F, September 1, 1864; for one and three years, Company G, September 17, 1864; and for one year. Companies H, I and K, October 13, 22, and 31, 1864, respectively.

The three years' men of the original 7th Regiment, serving with the 52nd Infantry, were assigned to Companies A, B, C and D of this regiment, July 22, 1864. The companies were recruited principally:

- A and C at Brooklyn and New York city
- B at Brooklyn, New York city and Albany
- D, E, F, G, H, I, and K in New York city, Brooklyn, Jamaica, Tarrytown, Albany, Poughkeepsie, Goshen, Schenectady, Kingston and Troy.

The regiment left the State in detachments, the first, Company A, in April, 1864; the companies, as they arrived, were attached to the 52nd and served as part of this regiment until July 22, 1864, when it appears on the records as a distinct organization.

The regiment joined the Army of the Potomac and participated in the Overland campaign and the Siege of Petersburg.

=== 1865 ===
The regiment served in the Siege of Petersburg and Appomattox campaign in the Consolidated Brigade, 1st Division, II Corps, Army of the Potomac. The men returned to New York and were honorably discharged and mustered out, under the command of Colonel Von Schack, August 4, 1865, at Hart's sland, New York harbor.

During its second incarnation, it lost by death, killed in action, 2 officers, 29 enlisted men; of wounds received in action, 1 officer, 18 enlisted men; of disease and other causes, 53 enlisted men; total, 3 officers, 100 enlisted men; aggregate, 103; of whom 9 died in the hands of the enemy.

== Senior officers ==
Colonels

- John E. Bendix
- Edward Kapff
- George W. Von Schack

Lieutenant Colonels

- Edward Kapff (promoted to colonel)
- Casper Keller
- Frederick A. H. Gaebel
- Anton Pokomey

Majors

- Casper Keller (promoted to lieutenant colonel)
- George W. Von Schack (promoted to colonel)
- Frederick A. H. Gaebel (promoted to lieutenant colonel)
- Charles Brestel
- Gustavus Seidel
- Jacob Scheu

== Affiliations, battle honors, detailed service, and casualties ==
=== Organizational affiliation ===
Attached to:

- Newport News, Va., Dept. of Virginia, to May, 1862
- 1st Brigade, 1st Division, II Corps, Army of the Potomac (AoP), to May, 1863.
- 52nd New York Infantry to July 22, 1864
- Consolidated Brigade, 1st Division, II Corps, AoP, to November 1864.
- 3rd Brigade, 1st Division, II Corps, AoP, to June 1865.
- Independent duty, Hart's Island, N. Y., to August, 1865.

=== List of battles ===
The official list of battles in which the regiment bore a part:

- Battle of Big Bethel
- Siege of Yorktown
- Battle of Williamsburg
- Battle of Fair Oaks
- Seven Days Battles
- Battle of Oak Grove
- Battle of White Oak Swamp
- Battle of Glendale
- Battle of Malvern Hill
- Battle of Antietam
- Battle of Fredericksburg
- Battle of Chancellorsville
- Battle of the Wilderness
- Battle of Spotsylvania Court House
- Battle of North Anna
- Battle of Totopotomoy Creek
- Battle of Cold Harbor
- First Battle of Petersburg
- Second Battle of Petersburg
- Battle of Weldon Railroad
- First Battle of Deep Bottom
- Second Battle of Deep Bottom
- Second Battle of Ream's Station
- Battle of Boydton Plank Road
- Battle of Hatcher's Run
- Battle of White Oak Road
- Battle of Sailor's Creek
- Battle of High Bridge
- Battle of Appomattox Court House

=== Detailed service ===
==== 1861 ====
- Occupation of Newport News, Va., May 27, and duty there till March, 1862.
- Action at Big Bethel, Va., June 10, 1861.
- Baker Lee's Farm, Newport News, July 12.

==== 1862 ====
- Battle between Monitor and Merrimac in Hampton Roads March 8–9, 1862.
- Joined Army of the Potomac on the Virginia Peninsula May, 1862.
- Seven days before Richmond June 25-July 1.
- About Fair Oaks June 26–29. Peach Orchard and Savage Station June 29.
- White Oak Swamp and Glendale June 30.
- Malvern Hill July 1.
- At Harrison's Landing till August 16.
- Movement to Fortress Monroe, thence to Centreville August 16–30.
- Maryland Campaign September 6–22.
- Battle of South Mountain September 14.
- Antietam September 16–17.
- Moved to Harper's Ferry, W. Va„ September 22, and duty there till October 30.
- Reconnoissance to Charlestown October 16–17.
- Advance up Loudoun Valley and movement to Falmouth October 30-November 17.
- Battle of Fredericksburg December 12–15.
- To winter encampment, Falmouth, Va., December 16

==== 1863 ====
- Falmouth, VA
- "Mud March" January 20–24
- Back to encampment, Camp Sickles, Falmouth, January 25
- Chancellorsville Campaign April 27 – May 6
  - Battle of Chancellorsville May 1–5
- Mustered out May 8, 1863, expiration of term.
- Three years' men attached to 52nd New York Infantry to July 22, 1864, then assigned to 7th Veteran Infantry.

==== 1864 ====
- Reorganized
- Siege of Petersburg, Va., July 22, 1864, to April 2. 1865.
- Demonstration north of the James River July 27–29, 1864.
- Deep Bottom July 27–28.
- Mine Explosion, Petersburg, July 30 (Reserve).
- Demonstration north of James River August 13–20.
- Strawberry Plains, Deep Bottom, August 14–18.
- Ream's Station August 25.
- Reconnoissance to Hatcher's Run December 9·10.

==== 1865 ====
- Dabney's Mills, Hatcher's Run, February 5–7, 1865.
- Watkins House March 25.
- Appomattox Court House March 28-April 9.
- Hatcher's Run or Boydton Road March 29–30.
- White Oak Road March 31.
- Sutherland Station and fall of Petersburg April 2.
- Sailor's Creek April 6.
- High Bridge, Farmvllle, April 7.
- Appomattox Court House April 9.
- Surrender of Lee and his army.
- March to Washington, D. C., Grand Review May 23.
- Moved to Hart's Island, N. Y., and duty there till August.
- Mustered out August 4, 1865.

== Casualties ==
During its service the 7th New York lost by death, killed in action, 9 officers and 76 enlisted men; of wounds received in action, 5 officers and 34 enlisted men; of disease and other causes, 1 officer and 60 enlisted men. Total: 15 officers, 170 enlisted men; aggregate, 185; of whom 7 enlisted men died in the hands of the enemy as prisoners of war.

== Armament ==
Soldiers in the 7th were armed with 803 Model 1842 Muskets. By the end of the first full year of hard campaigning, the regimented returned 720 Model 1842 smoothbore percussion muskets to the Adjutant General. At some point in the fall of 1861, the regiment, like others in its division, exchanged some of their smoothbore muskets for newer rifled muskets at the Washington DC arsenal. By the end of the first full year of hard campaigning, the regiment reported the following survey result to U.S. War Department:

- A — 17 49 Springfield Rifled Muskets, model 1855, 1861, National Armory (NA) (Note: In government records, National Armory refers to one of three United States Armory and Arsenals, the Springfield Armory, the Harpers Ferry Armory, and the Rock Island Arsenal. Rifle-muskets, muskets, and rifles were manufactured in Springfield and Harper's Ferry before the war. When the Rebels destroyed the Harpers Ferry Armory early in the American Civil War and stole the machinery for the Confederate central government-run Richmond Armory, the Springfield Armory was briefly the only government manufacturer of arms, until the Rock Island Arsenal was established in 1862. During this time production ramped up to unprecedented levels ever seen in American manufacturing up until that time, with only 9,601 rifles manufactured in 1860, rising to a peak of 276,200 by 1864. These advancements would not only give the Union a decisive technological advantage over the Confederacy during the war but served as a precursor to the mass production manufacturing that contributed to the post-war Second Industrial Revolution and 20th century machine manufacturing capabilities. American historian Merritt Roe Smith has drawn comparisons between the early assembly machining of the Springfield rifles and the later production of the Ford Model T, with the latter having considerably more parts, but producing a similar numbers of units in the earliest years of the 1913–1915 automobile assembly line, indirectly due to mass production manufacturing advancements pioneered by the armory 50 years earlier.) and contract, (.58 Cal.)
- B — 27 Springfield Rifled Muskets, model 1855, 1861, NA and contract, (.58 Cal.)
- C — 5 Springfield Rifled Muskets, model 1855, 1861, NA and contract, (.58 Cal.); 2 P53 Enfield Rifled Muskets. (Note: When the American arms company, Robbins & Lawrence's went bankrupt after the Crimean War ended, the New York firm of Fox, Henderson & Company, a creditor, agreed to accept 5,600 Pattern 1853 guns to be assembled by Vermont Arms as payment for their credit interest in the now bankrupt company. In 1858 Vermont Arms also failed, and the remaining inventory and assets were sold at auction. The State of New York purchased the completed arms and stored them in their armories. New York merchants like Fox, Henderson & Company also sold many of the completed arms (as well as imported Enfields built by license in Liege, Belgium) to southern states during 1860 and early 1861. The states had purchased the arms in preparation for the Civil War that they were sure was about to happen. Finally waking up to the arms purchases going on under their noses, in New York, on January 21, 1861, the NYPD intercepted and impounded 38 cases of rifled muskets that were being headed to Alabama and Georgia. The Enfields in New York's inventory were mostly American-made like the Windsors and license-built in Liege, Belgium.) (.58 and .577 Cal.); 40 Model 1842 Muskets smooth-bored Muskets, model 1842. Calibre .69
- D — 4 Springfield Rifled Muskets, model 1855, 1861, N.A. and contract. Calibre .58; 2 P53 Enfield Rifled Muskets, Calibre .58 and .577; 17 Model 1842 Muskets smooth-bored Muskets, model 1842. Calibre. 69
- E — 1 Springfield Rifled Muskets, model 1855, 1861, N.A. and contract. Calibre .58; 1 P53 Enfield Rifled Muskets, Calibre .58 or .577; 39 Model 1842 Muskets smooth-bored Muskets, model 1842. Calibre. 69
- F - 17 P53 Enfield Rifled Muskets, Calibre .58 and .577; 17 Model 1842 Muskets smooth-bored Muskets, model 1842. Calibre. 69
- G - 7 Springfield Rifled Muskets, model 1855, 1861, N.A. and contract. Calibre .58; 10 P53 Enfield Rifled Muskets, Calibre .58 or .577
- H - 32 Springfield Rifled Muskets, model 1855, 1861, N.A. and contract. Calibre .58; 1 P53 Enfield Rifled Muskets, Calibre .58 or .577
- I - 21 Model 1842 Muskets smooth-bored Muskets, model 1842. Calibre. 69
- K - 32 Model 1842 Muskets smooth-bored Muskets, model 1842. Calibre. 69

Three months later, after an effort to get most of the companies to be armed with the same weapon to make supply easier, the regiment reported the following survey:

- A — 36 Springfield Rifled Muskets, model 1855, 1861, N.A. and contract. Calibre .58
- B — 43 Springfield Rifled Muskets, model 1855, 1861, N.A. and contract. Calibre .58
- C — 59 Springfield Rifled Muskets, model 1855, 1861, N.A. and contract. Calibre .58; 2 P53 Enfield Rifled Muskets, Calibre .58 and .577
- D — 37 Springfield Rifled Muskets, model 1855, 1861, N.A. and contract. Calibre .58; 2 P53 Enfield Rifled Muskets, Calibre .58 and .577
- E — 49 Springfield Rifled Muskets, model 1855, 1861, N.A. and contract. Calibre .58; 17 P53 Enfield Rifled Muskets, Calibre .58 and .577
- F — 36 Springfield Rifled Muskets, model 1855, 1861, N.A. and contract. Calibre .58; 1 P53 Enfield Rifled Muskets, Calibre .58 and .577
- G — 7 Springfield Rifled Muskets, model 1855, 1861, N.A. and contract. Calibre .58; 3 P53 Enfield Rifled Muskets, Calibre .58 and .577
- H — 32 Springfield Rifled Muskets, model 1855, 1861, N.A. and contract. Calibre .58; 1 P53 Enfield Rifled Muskets, Calibre .58 and .577
- I — 35 Springfield Rifled Muskets, model 1855, 1861, N.A. and contract. Calibre .58
- K — 5 Springfield Rifled Muskets, model 1855, 1861, N.A. and contract. Calibre .58; 4 P53 Enfield Rifled Muskets, Calibre .58 and .577

=== Rifle-muskets ===
Issued weapons

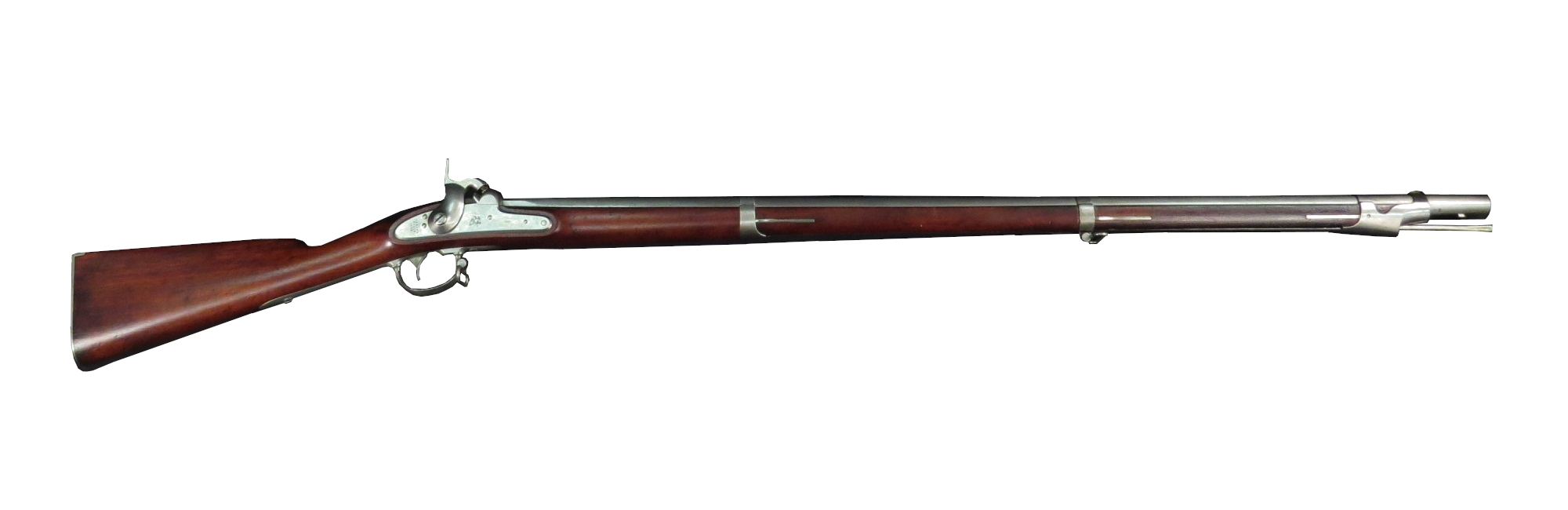
Model 1842 smoothbore musket

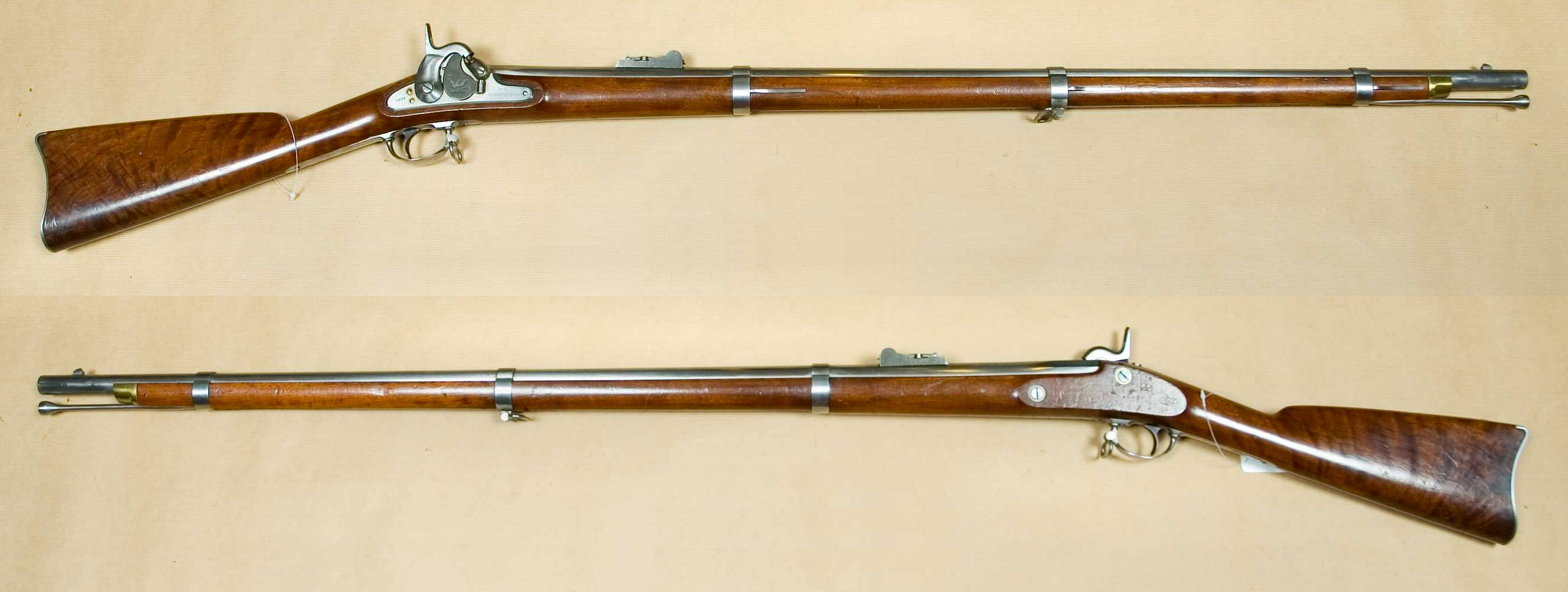
Springfield Model 1855

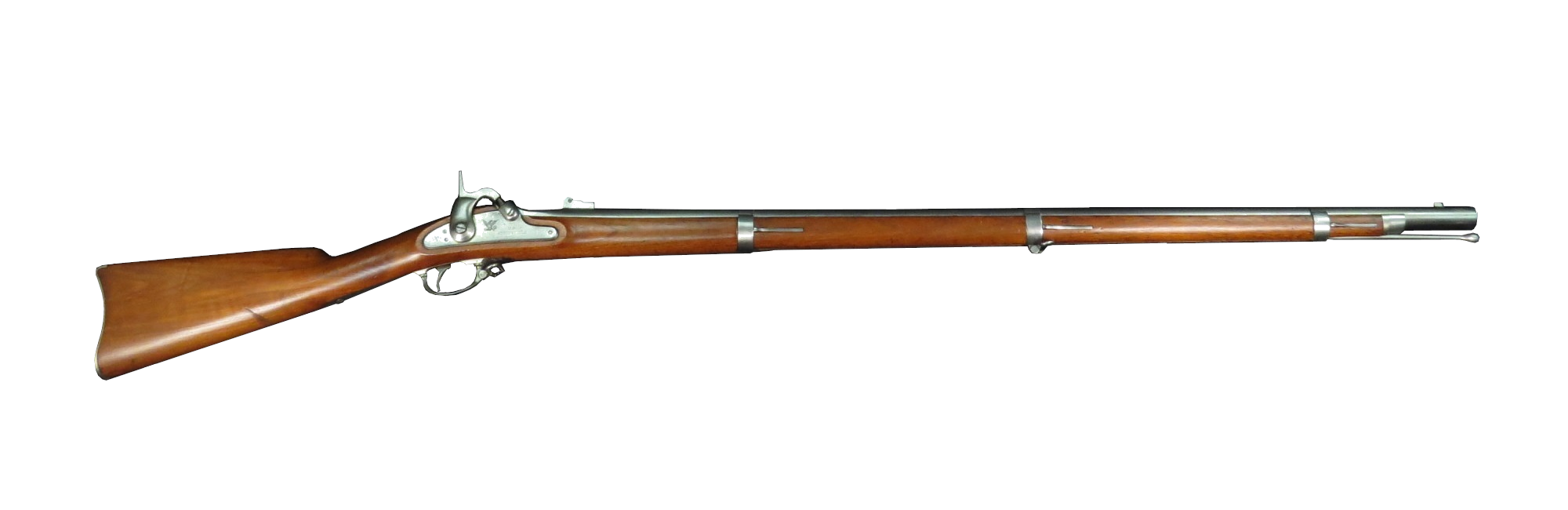
Springfield Model 1861

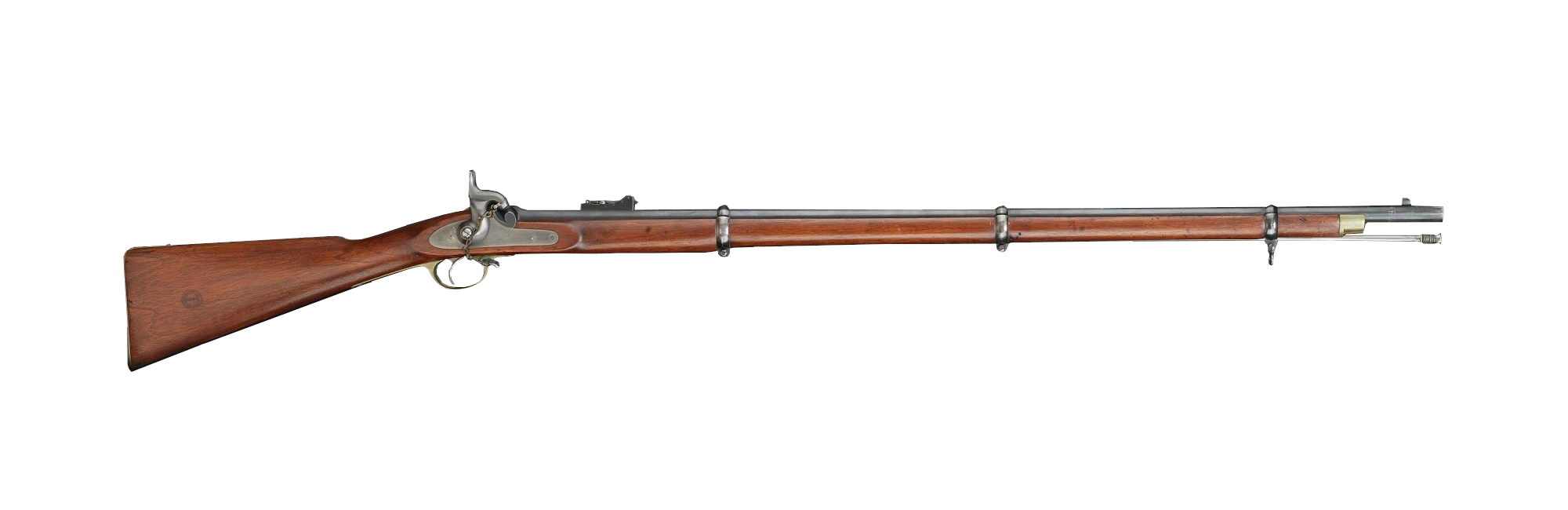
Pattern 1853 Enfield rifle-musket

== See also ==
- List of New York Civil War regiments
- 7th New York Militia
