= John E. Bendix =

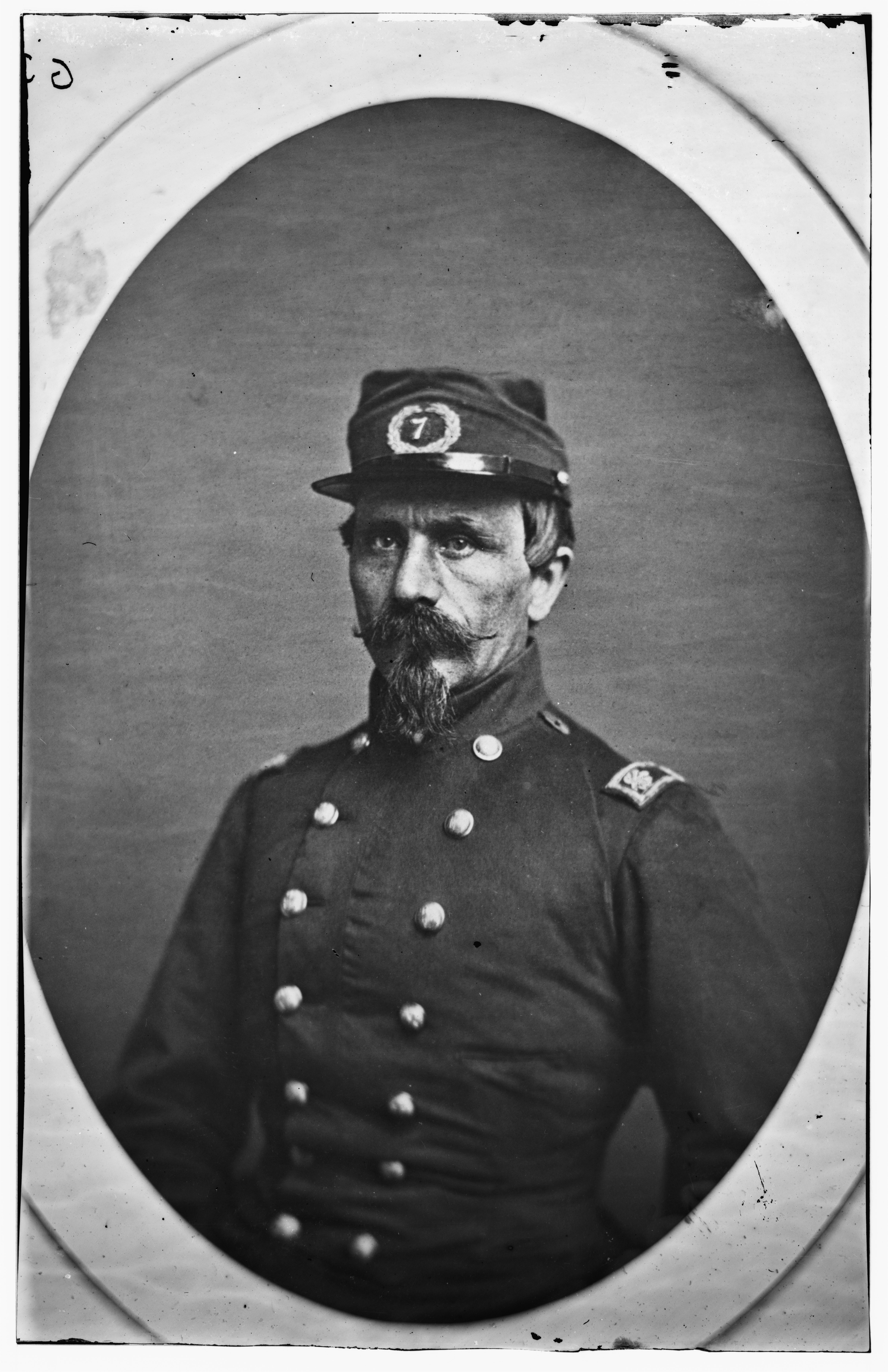
- Born: August 28, 1818 on board the steamer "Sarah"
- Died: October 8, 1877 (aged 59); New York City, New York
- Burial place: Green-Wood Cemetery, Brooklyn, New York
- Military career
- Allegiance: United States of America; Union
- Branch: Union Army; New York Militia
- Service years: 1861-1863; 1865
- Rank: Colonel; Brevet Brigadier General (Union Army); Brevet Brigadier General (New York Militia)
- Conflicts: American Civil War

John E. Bendix (August 28, 1818 – October 8, 1877) was an officer in the Union Army during the American Civil War who commanded two different New York regiments and then a brigade of infantry in Army of the Potomac in the Eastern Theater. He survived a serious wound at the Battle of Fredericksburg in December 1862. He was noted as a prolific recruiter and organizer, and after the war, as a brevet general in the New York Militia, he helped organize the reconstruction era the New York state militia that later became the New York Guard. Bendix was mustered out of the Union Army on May 7, 1863. In July 1866, he was nominated and confirmed for appointment to the grade of brevet brigadier general of volunteers, to rank from March 13, 1865.

== Biography ==
Bendix was born in between the United States and Canada, on board the "Sarah," one of the first steamers that navigated St. Lawrence River. His parents (who were natives of Germany), returned to their native land soon after their son's birth and educated the boy in the common schools. While yet in his teens, young Bendix returned to the U.S. and settled in New York City, where he learned the trades of pattern maker and machinist. He joined the 9th New York State Militia in 1847 as a private. He was appointed as the lieutenant colonel of the 11th New York State Militia in October 1859. He became a prominent member of the New York City Freemasonry movement.

Following the outbreak of the American Civil War in 1861, Bendix organized the 7th New York Infantry and was appointed as its first colonel on April 23, 1861. He resigned that position on August 6, 1861 and became the colonel of the 10th New York Infantry (the "National Zouaves") on September 2, 1861. The regiment served at Fort Monroe in Virginia over the winter. In May, he was part of an expedition against Confederate forces at Norfolk, Virginia.

During the 1862 Peninsula Campaign, he suffered a painful ankle wound during the Seven Days Battles. Later that same year, he participated in the battles of Second Bull Run, Antietam, and Fredericksburg, as well as several engagements of the intervening campaigns. Bendix was carried from the battlefield at Fredericksburg after suffering a serious wound in the neck from a shell fragment during the assault on Confederate entrenchments on Marye's Heights. He returned home to New York City on a leave of absence. He rejoined his regiment in January 1863, and assumed command of the 3rd Brigade, 3rd Division of the II Corps between March 16, 1863 and April 27, 1863. He remained in command until April 28, when the 10th New York was ordered home to be mustered out of the volunteer service on May 7, 1863. Bendix then was heavily involved in helping recruit and train new soldiers for other New York units. On July 20, 1866, President Andrew Johnson nominated Bendix for appointment to the grade of brevet brigadier general of volunteers, to rank from March 13, 1865, and the United States Senate confirmed the appointment on July 26, 1866.

Bendix organized the Third Regiment (Bendix Zouaves) in November 1865. He was appointed a brevet brigadier general in the New York Militia in 1865. He retired from the service in 1871 and died in New York City six years later at the age of 59. He is buried in Green-Wood Cemetery in Brooklyn.

New York Post #402 of the Grand Army of the Republic was named for General Bendix.

== See also ==
- List of American Civil War brevet generals (Union)
