= 52nd New York Infantry Regiment =

- Active: August 3, 1861, to July 1, 1865
- Country: United States
- Allegiance: Union
- Branch: Infantry
- Engagements: Siege of Yorktown; Battle of Seven Pines; Seven Days Battles; Battle of Antietam; Battle of Fredericksburg; Battle of Chancellorsville; Battle of Gettysburg; Bristoe Campaign; Mine Run Campaign; Battle of the Wilderness; Battle of Spotsylvania Court House; Battle of Cold Harbor; Siege of Petersburg; Battle of Jerusalem Plank Road; First Battle of Deep Bottom; Second Battle of Deep Bottom; Second Battle of Ream's Station; Appomattox Campaign; Battle of White Oak Road; Battle of Sutherland's Station; Battle of Sailor's Creek; Battle of High Bridge; Battle of Appomattox Court House

Insignia
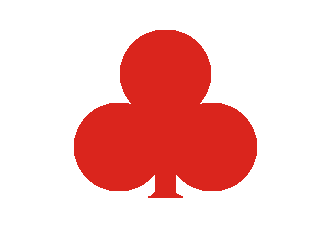
- II Corps (1st Division) badge

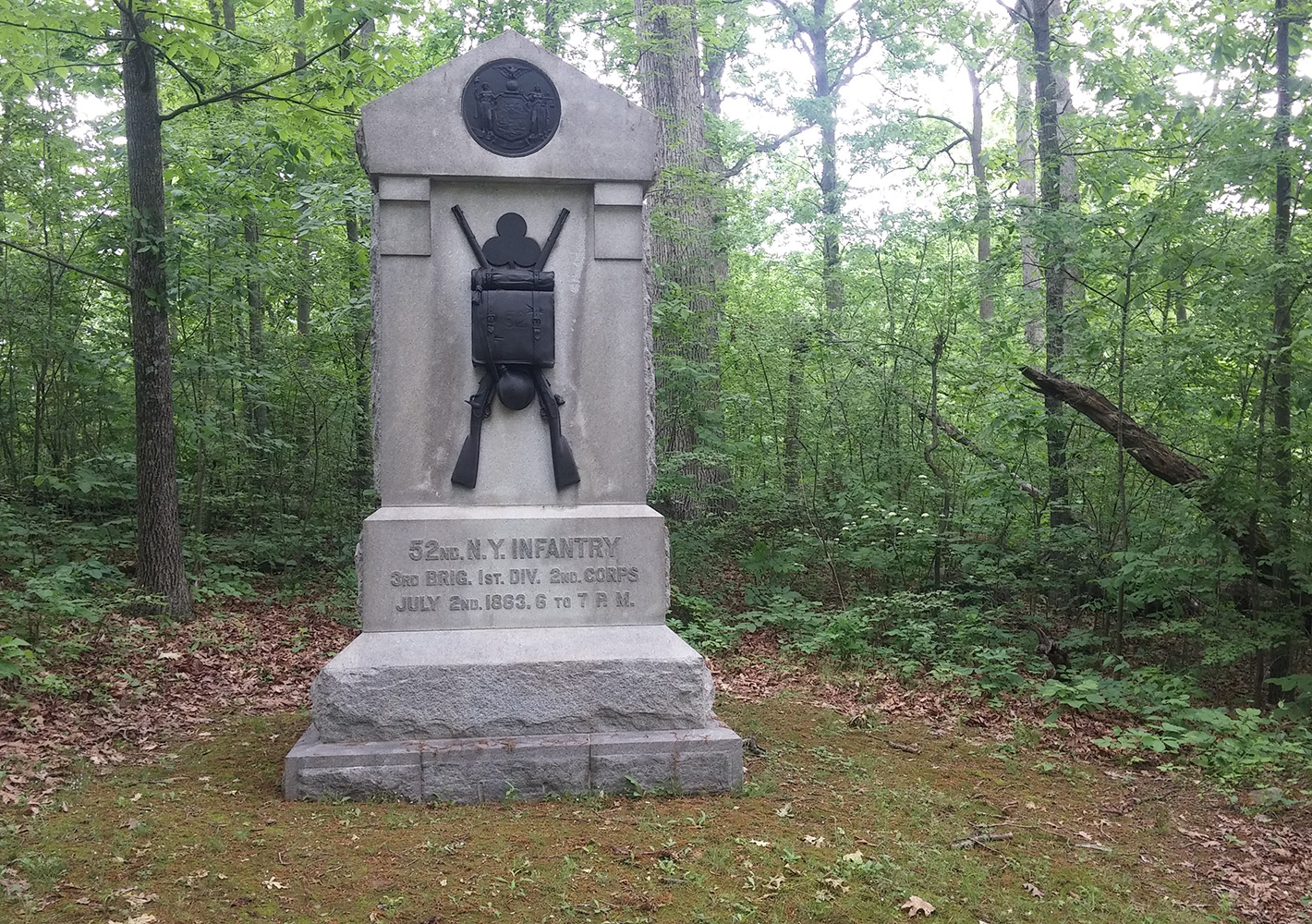
Monument to the 52nd New York Infantry at Gettysburg

The 52nd New York Infantry Regiment (or German Rangers, or Sigel Rifles) was an infantry regiment in the Union Army during the American Civil War.

== Service ==
The 52nd New York was formed on October 29, 1861 when two different units recruiting in New York City, New York were consolidated. The German Rangers, under Emil Von Schoening, had been enlisting men since the start of August 1861 while the Sigel Rifles, under Paul Frank, has been doing the same since the beginning of October 1861. Both units were composed mostly of German immigrants. Companies A-G came from the German Rangers while Companies H, I and K came from the Sigel Rifles. Paul Frank was appointed Colonel of the 52nd. The regiment was mustered in on November 1, 1861 for three years service.

In July 1862 a number of men from the 52nd were attached to the 1st New York Light Artillery Battalion, a four battery battalion also composed of ethnic Germans. In May 1863 this battalion was broken up, with the batteries renamed the 29th, 30th, 31st and 32nd Independent Battery’s. Those men returned to the 52nd in June 1863.

On April 23, 1863, 46 enlisted men of the 7th New York Infantry Regiment were temporarily transferred to the 52nd. The 7th, the only other New York regiment in the 2nd Corps composed of Germans, was to be mustered out as the regiment enlisted for only two years. These 46 men were recruited in 1862 and had less than one year of service. Colonel George Von Schack of the 7th was hoping to reorganize his regiment for further service, so these men were attached to the 52nd as a separate group until the 7th could return. However, the 7th was unable to reform in 1863 and those members were fully absorbed into the 52nd after Gettysburg. The 7th finally did return in 1864, as the 7th New York Veteran Infantry Regiment, and four of the companies were attached to the 52nd as they mustered in between March and July. On July 22, 1864 the 7th New York Veterans began to act as an independent unit, and the surviving members of the 7th New York were transferred into it.

By the second week of October 1863, the 52nd received about 600 newly enlisted men. Many of them had been drafted over the summer or enlisted as substitutes. These new men came from all over New York, and included both immigrants and those born in the United States. Many of them did not have German ancestry. In December 1863, a number of original members of the regiment re-enlisted for another three years.

From August to the end of October, 1864, those soldiers who enlisted in 1861 and had not re-enlisted the prior year were mustered out when their term of service expired. During that time, men were transferred between companies, with Companies A-D eventually mustering out. At the end of October, Companies E, F, G, H, I, and K were renamed Companies A-F, with a new Company G composed of new recruits.

The 52nd New York Infantry mustered out on July 1, 1865 at Alexandria, Virginia.

== Detailed service ==
Taken from Dyers Compendium

The regiment was attached to French's 3rd Brigade, Sumner's Division, Army of the Potomac, to March 1862. 3rd Brigade, Richardson's 1st Division, II Corps, Army of the Potomac, to August 1862. 1st Brigade, 1st Division, II Corps, to September 1862. 3rd Brigade, 1st Division, II Corps, to June 1864. Consolidated Brigade, 1st Division, II Corps, to November 1864. 3rd Brigade, 1st Division, II Corps, to July 1865.

Left New York for Washington, D.C., November 11, 1861.

Duty in the defenses of Washington, D.C., until March 1862. Advance on Manassas, Va., March 10–15.

Moved to the Peninsula, Va., April 3.

Siege of Yorktown April 5-May 4.

Battle of Fair Oaks or Seven Pines May 31-June 1.

Seven days before Richmond June 25-July 1. Battles of Gaines Mill June 27. Peach Orchard and Savage Station June 29. White Oak Swamp and Glendale June 30. Malvern Hill July 1.

At Harrison's Landing until August 16.

Movement to Fortress Monroe, then to Alexandria and Centreville August 16–30.

Cover Pope's retreat to Fairfax Court House September 1.

Maryland Campaign September 6–22. Battles of Antietam Creek September 15–16. Antietam September 17.

Duty at Harper's Ferry, Va., September 22-October 29.

Reconnaissance to Charlestown October 16–17.

Advance up Loudoun Valley and movement to Falmouth, Va., October 29-November 17.

Battle of Fredericksburg December 12–15.

"Mud March" January 20–24, 1863.

At Falmouth, Va., until April 27.

Chancellorsville Campaign April 27-May 6. Battle of Chancellorsville May 1–5.

Gettysburg Campaign June 11-July 24. Battle of Gettysburg, July 1–3. Pursuit of Lee July 5–24.

Duty on line of the Rappahannock until October. Advance from the Rappahannock to the Rapidan September 13–17.

Bristoe Campaign October 9–22. Auburn and Bristoe October 14.

Advance to line of the Rappahannock November 7–8.

Mine Run Campaign November 26-December 2.

At Stevensburg until May 1864.

Demonstration on the Rapidan February 6–7, 1864.

Campaign from the Rapidan to the James May 3-June 15. Battles of the Wilderness May 5–7; Spotsylvania May 8–12; Po River May 10; Spotsylvania Court House May 12–21. Assault on the Salient or "Bloody Angle" May 12. North Anna River May 23–26. On line of the Pamunkey May 26–28. Totopotomoy May 28–31. Cold Harbor June 1–12.

Before Petersburg June 16–18. Siege of Petersburg June 16, 1864, to April 2, 1865.

Jerusalem Plank Road, Weldon Railroad, June 22–23, 1864.

Demonstration north of the James July 27–29. First Battle of Deep Bottom July 27–28.

Demonstration north of the James August 13–20. Deep Bottom, August 14–18.

Ream's Station August 25.

Reconnaissance to Hatcher's Run December 9–10.

Dabney's Mills, Hatcher's Run, February 5–7, 1865.

Watkins' House March 25. Appomattox Campaign March 28-April 9. Hatcher's Run or Boydton Road March 31. White Oak Road March 31. Sutherland Station and fall of Petersburg April 2. Sailor's Creek April 6. High Bridge and Farmville April 7. Appomattox Court House April 9. Surrender of Lee and his army.

At Burkesville until May 2. March to Washington, D.C., May 2–15.

Grand Review of the Armies May 23. Duty at Washington, D.C., until July.

== Casualties ==
According to Dyers Compendium of the War of the Rebellion, the regiment lost a total of 350 men during service; 14 officers and 139 enlisted men killed or mortally wounded, and 197 enlisted men died of disease.

According to Phisterers New York in the War of the Rebellion, the regiment lost a total of 351 men during service; 8 officers and 82 enlisted men killed, 6 officers and 56 enlisted men mortally wounded, and 199 enlisted men died of disease or other causes. Of those losses, 1 officer and 107 enlisted men died as prisoners of war. The regiment suffered a further 29 officers and 387 enlisted men wounded, and 1 officer and 125 enlisted men listed as missing.

The majority of those listed as missing ended up as prisoners of war. The number of men who were captured during the war was higher than the number of men listed as missing.

== Commanders ==
- Colonel Paul A. Frank
- Lieutenant Colonel Henry M. Karples
- Lieutenant Colonel Charles G. Freudenberg - In command of the regiment at the start of the Battle of Gettysburg until wounded on July 2, 1863, while in temporary command of the brigade
- Major Edward Venuti - commanded at the Battle of Gettysburg until killed in action
- Major Henry P. Ritzius
- Captain William Scherrer - Commander at the end of the Battle of Gettysburg
- Captain George Degener - commanded at the First Battle of Deep Bottom

== Notable members ==
- Sergeant William Westerhold, Company G - Medal of Honor recipient for action at the Battle of Spotsylvania Court House (he was subsequently promoted to 1st lieutenant)
- William C. Orcutt, Companies G and C - Enlisted in August 1863 and mustered out in July 1865. Great grandfather of actress Lucille Ball

== See also ==
- List of New York Civil War regiments
- New York in the Civil War
- German Americans in the American Civil War
