= William Westerhold =

- Born: January 21, 1836; Binde, Prussia
- Died: May 12, 1910 (aged 74); New York City
- Military career
- Allegiance: United States of America; Union
- Branch: United States Army; Union Army
- Service years: 1861 - 1865
- Rank: First Lieutenant
- Unit: 52nd New York Infantry
- Conflicts: American Civil War • Battle of Spotsylvania Court House
- Awards: Medal of Honor

William Westerhold (January 21, 1836 – May 12, 1910) was a sergeant in the United States Army during the American Civil War. He received a Medal of Honor, the highest military decoration awarded by the United States government, for his actions at the Battle of Spotsylvania Court House on May 12, 1864.

== Military service ==
After emigrating from Prussia, Westerhold joined the Army from New York City in October 1861, and was assigned to the 52nd New York Infantry. He was commissioned as an officer a few days after his MOH action, and mustered out with his regiment in July 1865.

He was awarded the Medal of Honor for action on May 12, 1864, at Spotsylvania, Virginia. He is credited with risking his life to capture the flag of a Confederate Army regiment, the 23rd Virginia Infantry.

== Medal of Honor citation ==
The President of the United States of America, in the name of Congress, takes pleasure in presenting the Medal of Honor to First Lieutenant William Westerhold, United States Army, for, Capture of flag of 23d Virginia Infantry (C.S.A.) and its bearer.

== See also ==
- List of Medal of Honor recipients
- List of American Civil War Medal of Honor recipients: T–Z
