= Watkins House (Keysville, Virginia) =

Historic house in Virginia, United States

- U.S. National Register of Historic Places
- Virginia Landmarks Register
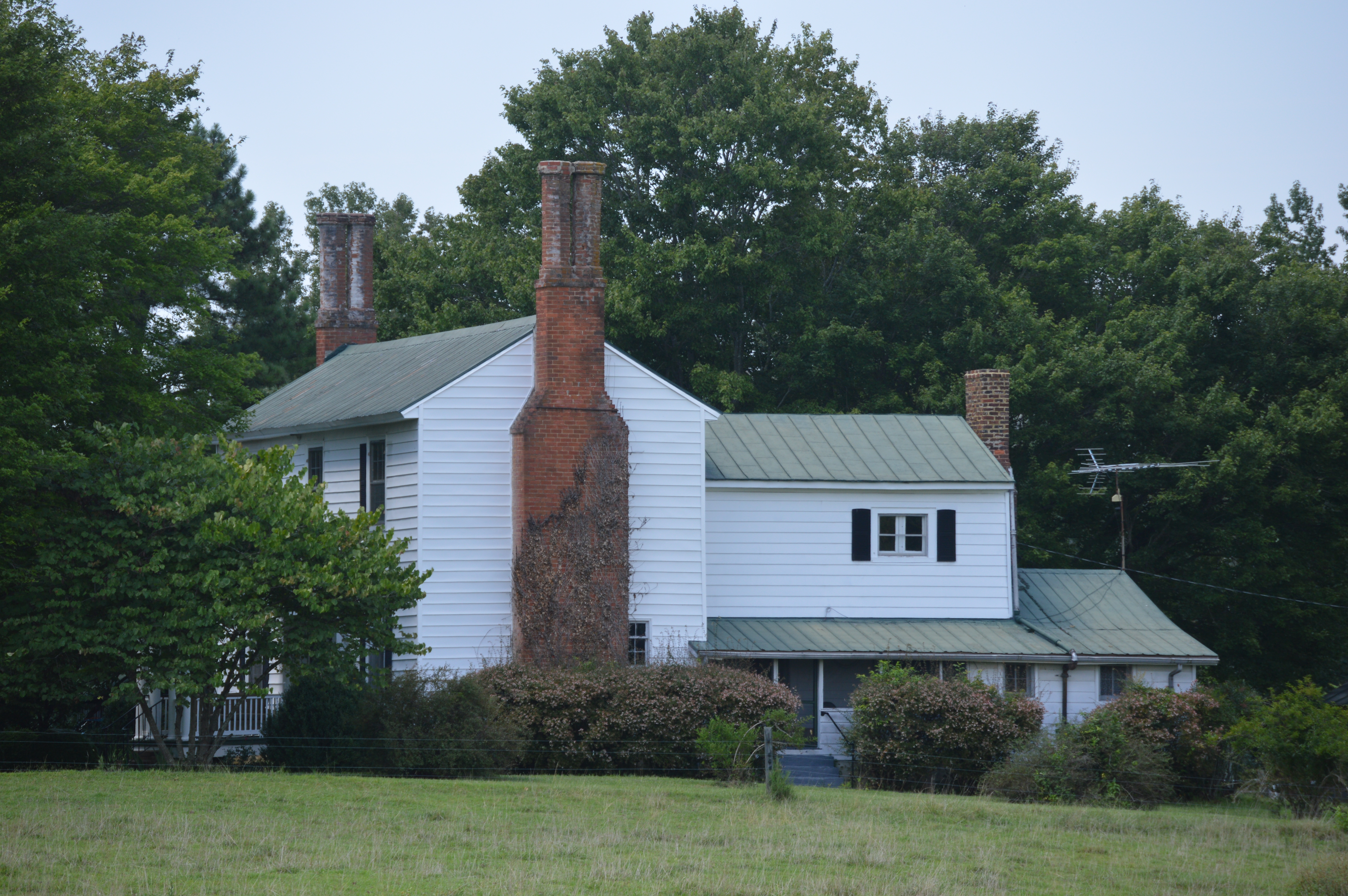
- Distant view of the eastern side

- Location within Virginia Location within the United States
- Location: 3115 Briery Rd., Keysville, Virginia
- Coordinates: 37°4′27″N 78°30′24″W
- Area: 15.1 acres (6.1 ha)
- Built: c. 1830
- Architectural style: Greek Revival
- NRHP reference No.: 04000549
- VLR No.: 019-5168

Significant dates
- Added to NRHP: May 27, 2004
- Designated VLR: March 17, 2004

Watkins House, also known as Shoo-Crymes Place, Crymes Place, and Bonis Est Farm, is a historic farmhouse located near Keysville, Charlotte County, Virginia. It was built c1830, and is a two-story, three-bay, frame I-house in a transitional Federal / Greek Revival style. It has a rear wing and features a pair of tall hexagonal brick chimney stacks. Also on the property are a contributing a tobacco barn, a wagon shed / granary, an equipment or storage building, a hay barn / stable, and a chicken coop.

It was listed on the National Register of Historic Places in 2004.
