= First Battle of Deep Bottom =

Battle of the American Civil War

Coordinates: 37.4359°N 77.2609°W

- Part of the American Civil War
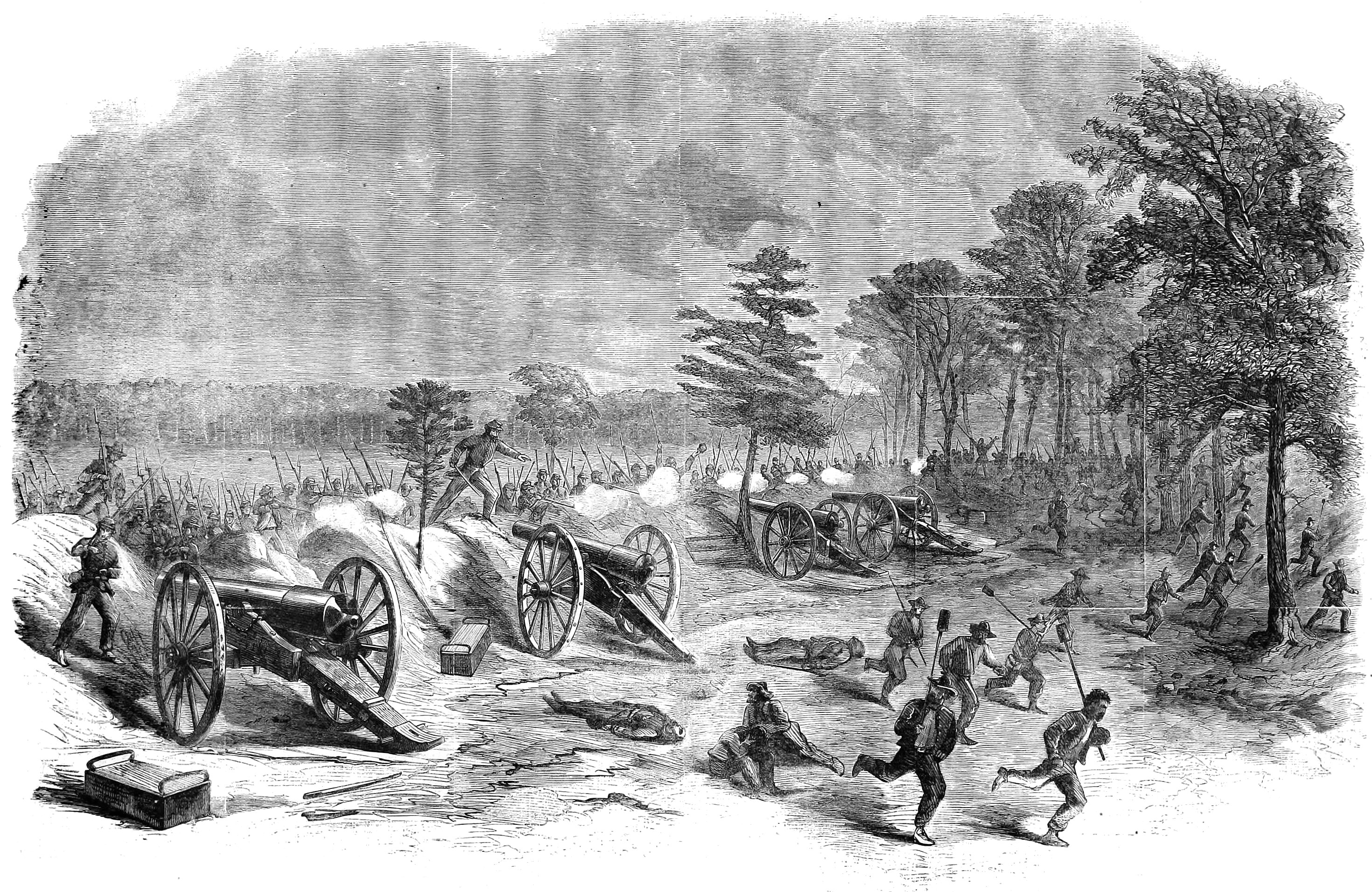
- Capture of four guns by Barlow's Division, July 27, 1864
Date	July 27–29, 1864
Location	Henrico County, Virginia
Result	Strategic Union Victory

Belligerents
United States (Union)	(Confederate States of America) CSA (Confederacy)

Commanders and leaders
Winfield S. Hancock; Philip H. Sheridan	Richard S. Ewell; Richard H. Anderson

Casualties and losses
488 (62 killed, 340 wounded, 86 missing/captured). (Note: Bonekemper presents casualty figures from a wide variety of sources and provides his best estimate. Salmon estimates 488 Union, 650 Confederate. Horn estimates 488 Union, 700 Confederate. Kennedy estimates 1,000 total.)	679 (80 killed, 391 wounded, 208 missing/captured)

The First Battle of Deep Bottom, also known as Darbytown, Strawberry Plains, New Market Road, or Gravel Hill, was fought July 27–29, 1864, at Deep Bottom in Henrico County, Virginia, as part of the Siege of Petersburg of the American Civil War. A Union force under Maj. Gens. Winfield S. Hancock and Philip H. Sheridan was sent on an expedition threatening Richmond, Virginia, and its railroads, intending to attract Confederate troops away from the Petersburg defensive line, in anticipation of the upcoming Battle of the Crater. The Union infantry and cavalry force was unable to break through the Confederate fortifications at Bailey's Creek and Fussell's Mill and was withdrawn, but it achieved its desired effect of momentarily reducing Confederate strength at Petersburg.

== Background ==
Deep Bottom is the colloquial name for an area of the James River in Henrico County 11 miles (18 km) southeast of Richmond, Virginia, at a horseshoe-shaped bend in the river known as Jones Neck. It was a convenient crossing point from the Bermuda Hundred area on the south side of the river.

Lt. Gen. Ulysses S. Grant began a siege of the city of Petersburg, Virginia, after initial assaults on the Confederate lines, June 15–18, 1864, failed to break through. While Union cavalry conducted the Wilson-Kautz Raid (June 22 – July 1) in an attempt to cut the railroad lines leading into Petersburg, Grant and his generals planned a renewed assault on the Petersburg fortifications, an attack scheduled for July 30 that would become known as the Battle of the Crater. Hoping to increase the chances for success at Petersburg, Grant planned a movement against Richmond that Gen. Robert E. Lee would likely counter with troops taken out of the Petersburg line.

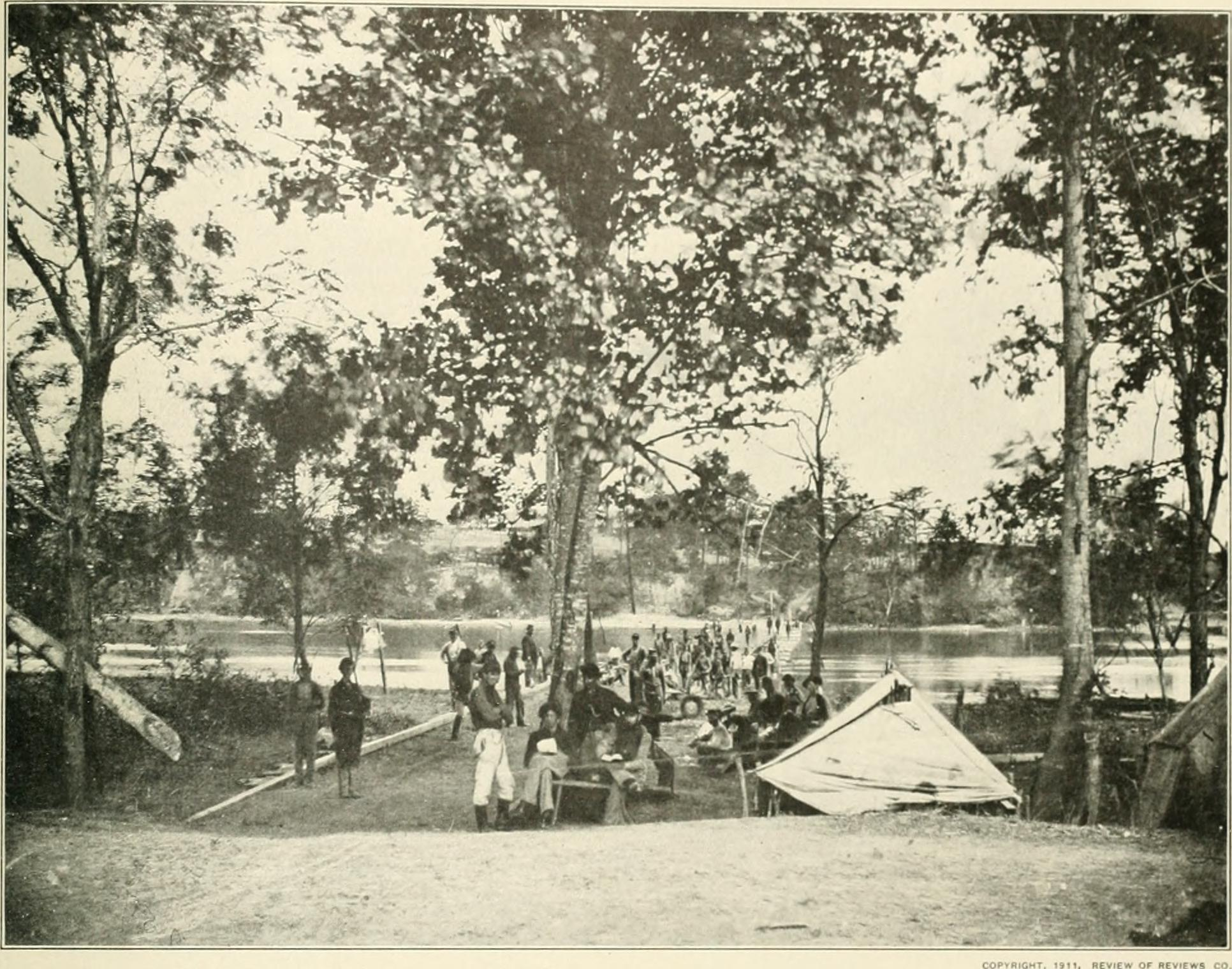
Pontoon bridge at Deep Bottom

On the 26th, we commenced a movement with Hancock's corps and Sheridan's cavalry to the north side by the way of Deep Bottom, where Butler had a pontoon bridge laid. The plan, in the main, was to let the cavalry cut loose and, joining with Kautz's cavalry of the Army of the James, get by Lee's lines and destroy as much as they could of the Virginia Central Railroad, while, in the mean time, the infantry was to move out so as to protect their rear and cover their retreat back when they should have got through with their work. We were successful in drawing the enemy's troops to the north side of the James as I expected.

— Personal Memoirs of U.S. Grant

Grant ordered the II Corps of the Army of the Potomac, commanded by Maj. Gen. Winfield S. Hancock, and two divisions of Maj. Gen. Philip H. Sheridan's Cavalry Corps to cross the river to Deep Bottom by pontoon bridge and advance against the Confederate capital. A division of the X Corps (Army of the James), commanded by Brig. Gen. Robert S. Foster, had previously crossed on a second pontoon bridge just upstream to secure a bridgehead on the north bank of the river. Grant's plan called for Hancock to pin down the Confederates at Chaffin's Bluff and prevent reinforcements from opposing Sheridan's cavalry, which would attack Richmond if practicable. If not—a circumstance Grant considered more likely—Sheridan was ordered to ride around the city to the north and west and cut the Virginia Central Railroad, which was supplying Richmond from the Shenandoah Valley.

The Confederate fieldworks protecting Richmond were commanded by Lt. Gen. Richard S. Ewell. When Lee found out about Hancock's pending movement, he ordered that the Richmond lines be reinforced to 16,500 men. The four brigades of Maj. Gen. Joseph B. Kershaw's division joined Col. John S. Fulton's brigade of the Department of Richmond and the brigades of Brig. Gens. James H. Lane and Samuel McGowan from Maj. Gen. Cadmus M. Wilcox's division. The reinforcements moved east on New Market Road (present-day Virginia State Route 5) and took up positions on the eastern face of New Market Heights.

== Battle ==
=== July 27 ===
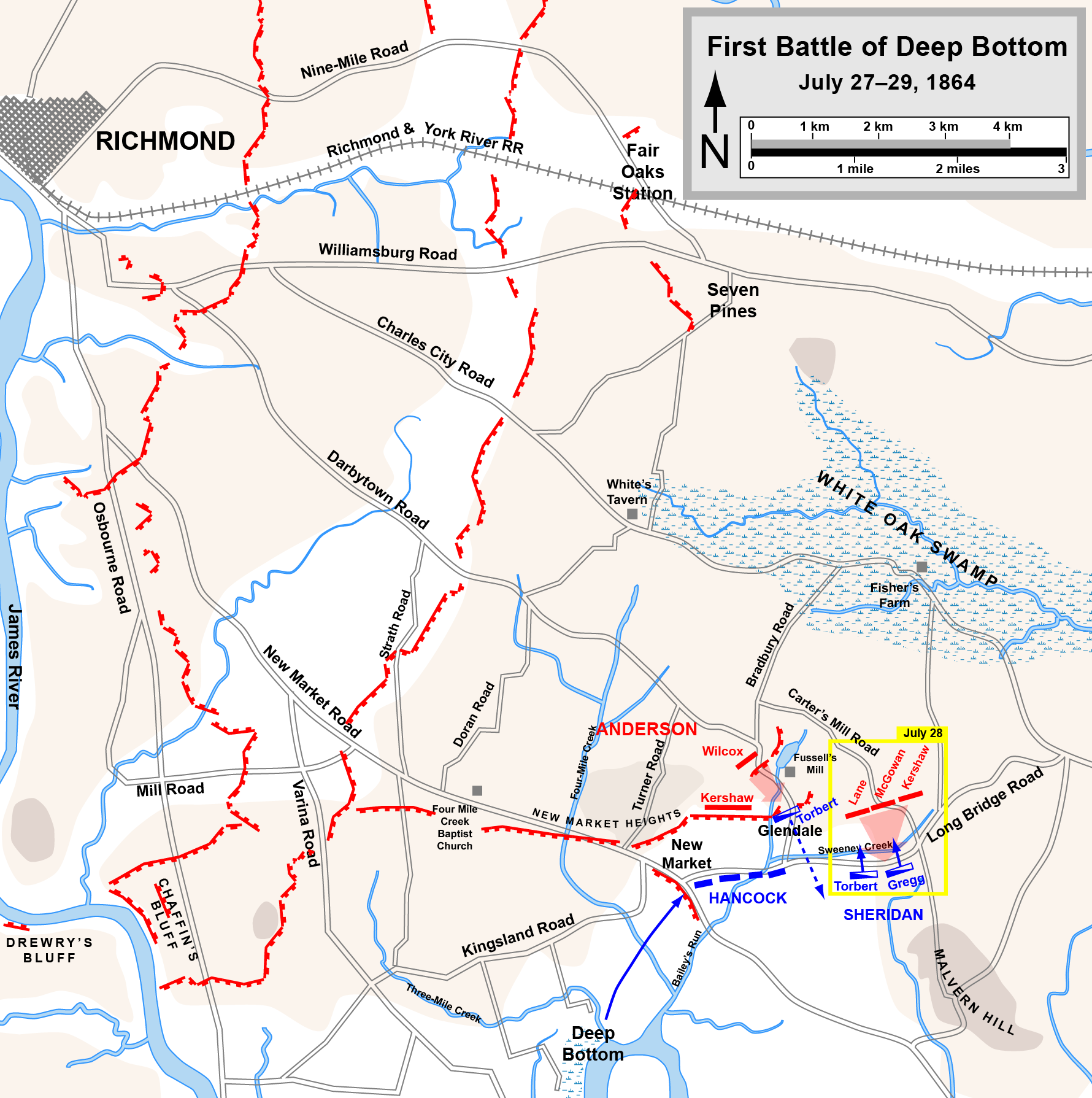
First Battle of Deep Bottom Confederate Union

Hancock and Sheridan crossed the pontoon bridge starting at 3 a.m., July 27. The II Corps advanced with the division of Maj. Gen. John Gibbon on the left, Brig. Gen. Francis C. Barlow in the center, and Brig. Gen. Gershom Mott on the right. They broke through the Confederate rifle pits on the New Market Road, captured four cannons, and continued to advance towards the Long Bridge Road. After being distracted by Confederate artillery fire, which Mott's infantry was able to suppress, the II Corps took up positions on the east bank of Bailey's Creek, from New Market Road to near Fussell's Mill. Sheridan's cavalry rode to the high ground on the right, overlooking the millpond. The cavalry division of Brig. Gen. Alfred T. A. Torbert captured the high ground near Fussell's Mill, but they were counterattacked and driven back by the 10th and 50th Georgia Infantry regiments. The Confederate works on the west bank of Bailey's Creek were formidable and Hancock chose not to attack them, spending the rest of the day performing reconnaissance.

While Hancock was stymied at Bailey's Creek, Robert E. Lee began bringing up more reinforcements from Petersburg, reacting as Grant had hoped. He assigned Lt. Gen. Richard H. Anderson to take command of the Deep Bottom sector and sent in Maj. Gen. Henry Heth's infantry division and Maj. Gen. W.H.F. "Rooney" Lee's cavalry division. Troops were also hurriedly detailed from the Department of Richmond to help the man the trenches.

=== July 28 ===
On the morning of July 28, Grant reinforced Hancock with a brigade of the XIX Corps, which freed up Gibbon's division from its position on the New Market Road to assist in an attack on the Confederate left. Sheridan's men attempted to turn the Confederate left with an advance against Gravel Hill, but their movement was disrupted by a Confederate attack. Three brigades—Lane's, McGowan's, and Kershaw's (his original brigade before he became division commander)—attacked Sheridan's right flank. The Union cavalrymen formed a battle line in which they were lying prone just beyond a shallow ridgeline. The Confederates charged over the crest and encountered heavy fire from the Union repeating carbines. Mounted Federals in Sheridan's reserve pursued and captured nearly 200 prisoners; the Confederates were able to capture a single Union cannon before withdrawing to their earthworks.

== Aftermath ==
By the afternoon of July 28, Hancock had repositioned his divisions to ensure that his force could return to the Deep Bottom crossing point without interference. No further combat occurred and the expedition against Richmond and its railroads was terminated. Satisfied that the operation had distracted sufficient Confederate forces from his front, General Grant determined to proceed with the assault against the Crater on July 30. He ordered Hancock to send Mott's division to the Petersburg trenches that night so that the XVIII Corps could take up a position to support the assault. The remainder of the II Corps and the cavalry recrossed the James on July 31.

Union casualties at the First Battle of Deep Bottom were 488 (62 killed, 340 wounded, and 86 missing or captured); Confederate casualties were 679 (80 killed, 391 wounded, 208 missing or captured). The Second Battle of Deep Bottom would be conducted in essentially the same area, August 13–20, 1864.

== Battlefield preservation ==
The Civil War Trust (a division of the American Battlefield Trust) and its partners have acquired and preserved 258 acres (1.04 km^{2}) of the battlefield.
